= Nymphaea paganuccii =

Scientific classification
- Kingdom: Plantae
- Clade: Tracheophytes
- Clade: Angiosperms
- Order: Nymphaeales
- Family: Nymphaeaceae
- Genus: Nymphaea
- Subgenus: Nymphaea subg. Hydrocallis
- Species: N. paganuccii

Binomial name
- Nymphaea paganuccii C.T.Lima & Giul.
- Nymphaea paganuccii is endemic to Brazil

Species of water lily

Nymphaea paganuccii is a species of waterlily endemic to Brazil.

== Description ==
=== Vegetative characteristics ===
Nymphaea paganuccii is an aquatic herb. It has cylindrical tubers, which are not stoloniferous. The glabrous, green, non-brittle petioles have four primary central and four secondary peripheral air canals. The elliptic, suborbicular to orbicular leaf blade has a flat and entire margin. The blade is 15.3–19.8 cm long and 10–17.3 cm wide.

=== Generative characteristics ===
The nocturnal flowers float on the water surface. The non-brittle, brownish, glabrous peduncle has six primary central and 12 secondary peripheral air canals. The ovoid, smooth, pilose seeds have trichomes arranged in continuous longitudinal lines. The seeds are 1–1.2 mm long and 0.7–0.8 mm wide.

== Reproduction ==
=== Vegetative reproduction ===
Both stolons and proliferating pseudanthia are absent.

=== Generative reproduction ===
Flowering and fruiting has been observed in the month of July. Sexual reproduction plays a significant role in this species.

== Taxonomy ==
It was first described by C.T.Lima and Ana Maria Giulietti in 2021.

=== Type specimen ===
The type specimen was collected by C.T. Lima and L. Lima at depths of 1-3 m in a lagoon by the Tapajós river of the Santarém municipality in the state Pará, Brazil on the 18th of July 2011.

=== Placement within Nymphaea ===
It is placed in Nymphaea subg. Hydrocallis.

== Etymology ==
The specific epithet paganuccii honours Prof. Dr. Luciano Paganucci de Queiroz of the State University of Feira de Santana, Brazil.

== Ecology ==
=== Habitat ===
It occurs in the aquatic habitats of the Amazon rainforest. The depth of the lagoon habitat in the type locality fluctuates based on precipitation in the region, with a complete dry period occurring between August and December. It occurs sympatrically with several other Nymphaea species, namely Nymphaea amazonum, Nymphaea pedersenii, Nymphaea rapinii, and Nymphaea lingulata.

=== Pollination ===
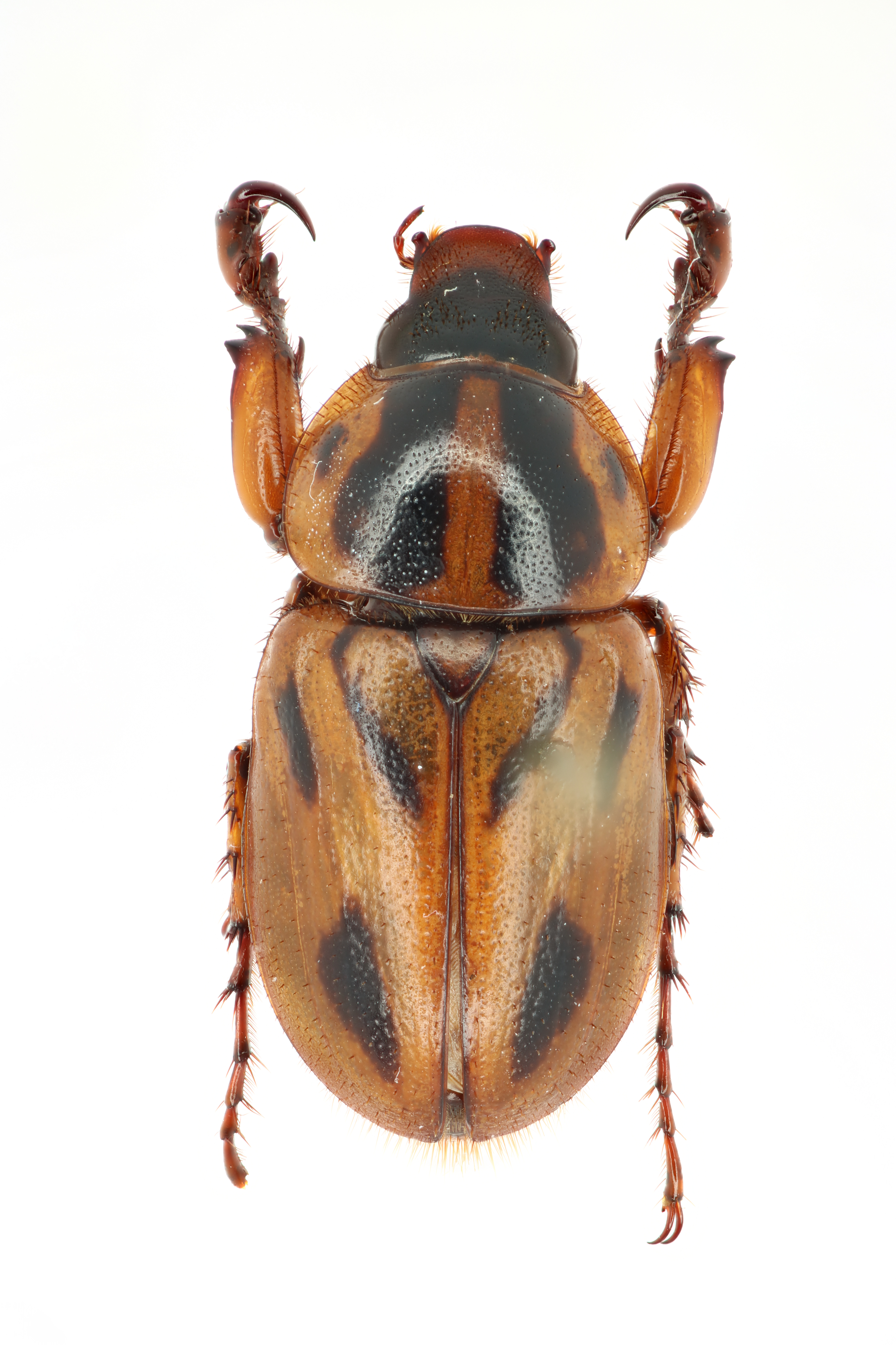
Beetles of the genus Cyclocephala visit flowers of Nymphaea paganuccii

Beetles of the genus Cyclocephala visit the flowers of Nymphaea paganuccii and have been trapped within them, indicating pollination by these beetles.
