= Nymphaea novogranatensis =

Scientific classification
- Kingdom: Plantae
- Clade: Tracheophytes
- Clade: Angiosperms
- Order: Nymphaeales
- Family: Nymphaeaceae
- Genus: Nymphaea
- Subgenus: Nymphaea subg. Hydrocallis
- Species: N. novogranatensis

Binomial name
- Nymphaea novogranatensis Wiersema

Species of water lily

Nymphaea novogranatensis is a species of waterlily native to Colombia, Mexico, and Venezuela.

== Description ==
=== Vegetative characteristics ===
Nymphaea novogranatensis is an aquatic herb with ovoid rhizomes, which are stoloniferous in the initial growth phase. The broadly elliptic-ovate to suborbicular, subcoriaceous to skin-like, 24 cm long and 21 cm wide leaves have a green adaxial surface. Purple spotting occurs on younger foliage. The brownish purple abaxial leaf surface may also feature dark spotting. The glabrous, 5 mm wide petioles have 2-4 primary and 6-8 secondary air canals.

=== Generative characteristics ===
The nocturnal flowers either float on the water surface, or are slightly emergent. They are attached to the glabrous, 7.5 mm wide peduncle with 5, 6, 15, or 18 primary air canals.

The flowers are slightly fragrant.

== Cytology ==
The diploid chromosome count is 2n = 28.

== Reproduction ==
=== Vegetative reproduction ===
The rhizomes of Nymphaea novogranatensis are stoloniferous in the initial growth phase. Proliferating pseudanthia are absent.

=== Generative reproduction ===
Nymphaea novogranatensis depends on sexual reproduction. Contrary to other Nymphaea species, autogamous seed production is less fruitful. Therefore, it is more reliant on cross-pollination.

== Taxonomy ==
It was first described by Wiersema in 1984.

=== Type specimen ===
The type specimen of Nymphaea novogranatensis was collected from a small depression along the road by Wiersema and González in Guarico, Venezuela on 31 August 1981.

=== Placement within Nymphaea ===
It is placed in Nymphaea subg. Hydrocallis. It is closely related to Nymphaea tenuinervia.

== Etymology ==
The specific epithet novogranatensis is a demonym for Colombia, formerly called Nueva Granada.

== Conservation ==
In Mexico, it is threatened with extinction. Nymphaea novogranatensis is vulnerable to habitat loss resulting from human activities.

== Ecology ==
=== Habitat ===
In Mexico, Nymphaea novogranatensis grows in temporary puddles found in low, open regions of thorny scrublands dominated by Parkinsonia aculeata. It occurs sympatrically with Nymphaea amazonum, Nymphaea jamesoniana, and Nymphaea pulchella. It also occurs in flooded savannahs, lagoons, and puddles. It has a disjunct distribution.

=== Pollination ===
Nymphaea novogranatensis is pollinated by beetles.
