= Nymphaea rapinii =

Scientific classification
- Kingdom: Plantae
- Clade: Tracheophytes
- Clade: Angiosperms
- Order: Nymphaeales
- Family: Nymphaeaceae
- Genus: Nymphaea
- Subgenus: Nymphaea subg. Hydrocallis
- Species: N. rapinii

Binomial name
- Nymphaea rapinii C.T.Lima & Giul.
- Nymphaea rapinii is endemic to Brazil

Species of water lily

Nymphaea rapinii is a species of waterlily endemic to Brazil.

== Description ==
=== Vegetative characteristics ===
Nymphaea rapinii is an aquatic herb with stoloniferous, cylindrical tubers. The reddish-purple, glabrous, non-brittle, petioles have two primary and eight secondary peripheral air canals. The elliptic, suborbicular to orbicular leaf blade has an entire and flat margin and actinodromous, arachnoid venation with impressed veins. The leaf blade is 6–10.5 cm long and 4.2–10 cm wide.

=== Generative characteristics ===
The nocturnal flowers float on the water surface. The gabrous, brownish, non-brittle peduncle has five primary central and ten secondary peripheral air canals.

== Reproduction ==
=== Vegetative reproduction ===
Stolons are present, but proliferating pseudanthia are absent.

=== Generative reproduction ===
Flowering has been observed in July, but no fruits have been found.

== Taxonomy ==
It was first described by C.T.Lima and Ana Maria Giulietti in 2021.

=== Type specimen ===
The type specimen was collected by C.T. Lima and L. Lima in the Curuá Una River in the Prainha municipality in the state of Pará, Brazil on the 17th of July 2011. This species is only known from the type locality.

=== Placement within Nymphaea ===
It is placed in Nymphaea subg. Hydrocallis.

== Etymology ==
The specific epithet rapinii honours Prof. Dr. Alessandro Rapini of the State University of Feira de Santana, Brazil.

== Ecology ==
=== Habitat ===
It occurs in the aquatic habitats of the Amazon rainforest. It inhabits the Curuá Una River, where seasonal changes of water levels occur based on precipitation, yet the river never dries up completely. Nymphaea rapinii was found growing in depths of 3 meters, where it occurred sympatrically with Nymphaea lingulata and Nymphaea paganuccii.
