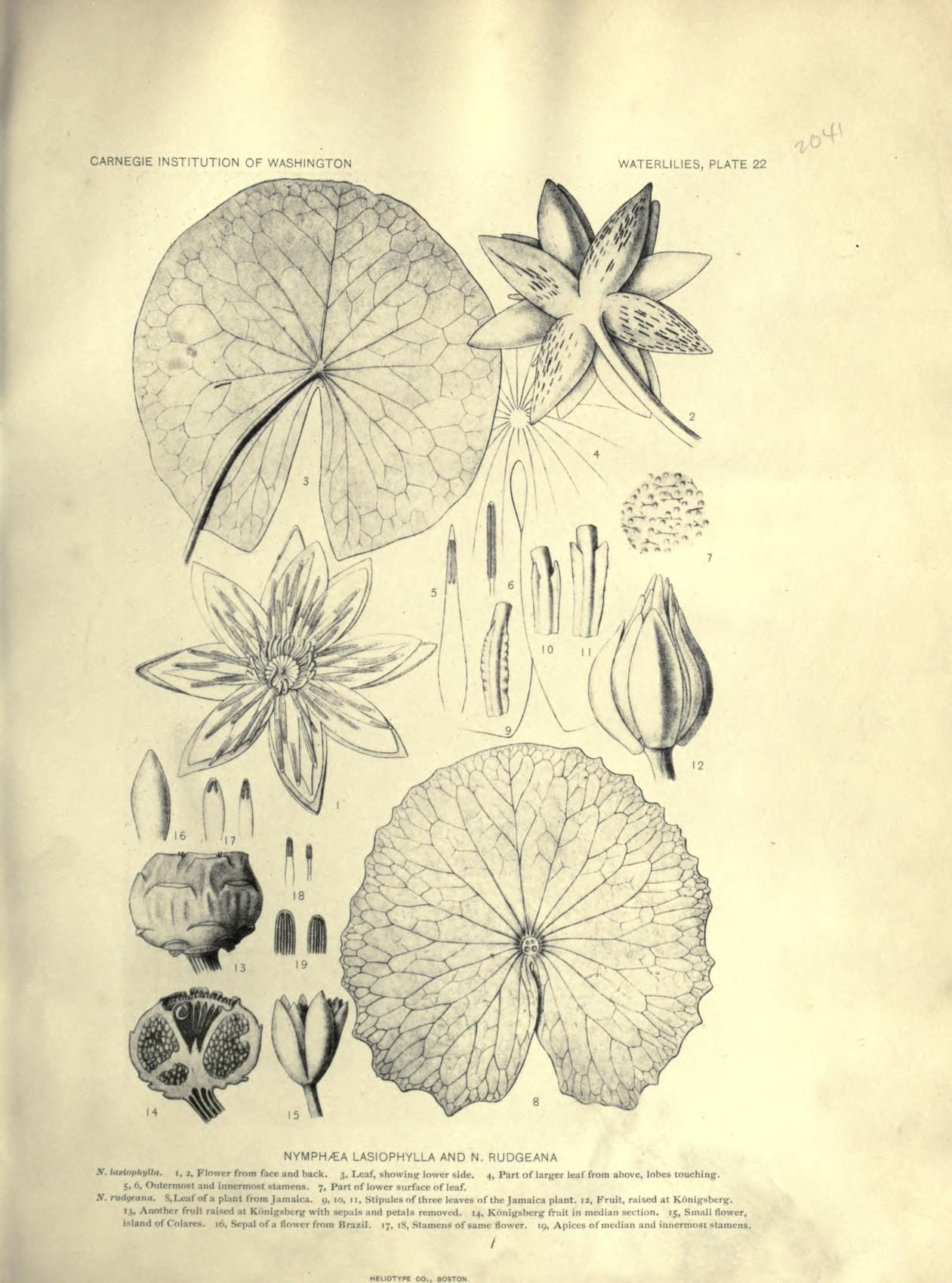
- Botanical illustration of Nymphaea lasiophylla and Nymphaea rudgeana from the publication "The Waterlilies, a Monograph of the Genus Nymphea" by Henry Shoemaker Conard (1905)

Scientific classification
- Kingdom: Plantae
- Clade: Tracheophytes
- Clade: Angiosperms
- Order: Nymphaeales
- Family: Nymphaeaceae
- Genus: Nymphaea
- Subgenus: Nymphaea subg. Hydrocallis
- Species: N. lasiophylla

Binomial name
- Nymphaea lasiophylla Mart. & Zucc.
- Nymphaea lasiophylla is native to East Brazil

Synonyms
- Leuconymphaea lasiophylla (Mart. & Zucc.) Kuntze

= Nymphaea lasiophylla =

Species of water lily

Nymphaea lasiophylla is a species of waterlily native to East Brazil. It has also been introduced to the Venezuelan Antilles.

== Description ==
=== Vegetative characteristics ===
Nymphaea lasiophylla is an aquatic herb with cylindrical tubers. The leaf blade is suborbicular to orbicular and has an entire, flat margin. The actinodromous leaf venation with impressed veins has 7-11 primary veins.

=== Generative characteristics ===
The nocturnal flowers float on the water surface. The crimson red, 6-7 mm long carpellary appendages are clavate.

The strongly aromatic, solvent-like floral fragrance consists of twelve compounds: Methyl hexanoate, Methyl 2-methylbutanoate, Ethyl 2-methylbutanoate, Methyl 2-hydroxy-2-methylbutanoate, Methyl 3-hydroxy-2-methylpropanoate, Benzyl alcohol, Benzaldehyde, Methyl benzoate, Benzyl 2-methylbutanoate, Anisole, (methoxymethyl)benzene, and 1.4-dimethoxybenzene.

== Cytology ==
The diploid chromosome count is 2n = 18.

== Reproduction ==
=== Vegetative reproduction ===
Both stolons and proliferating pseudanthia are present. Nymphaea lasiophylla forms 1-2 secondary proliferating pseudanthia. They are the main mode of reproduction in this species. The tubers, which often develop leaves and roots prior to their detachment, break off easily from the proliferating pseudanthia. They briefly float in the water and grow into new plants elsewhere.

=== Generative reproduction ===
While generative reproduction does occur, its significance is diminished by the prominence of vegetative reproduction through proliferating pseudanthia. Seeds were only observed in one of 20 populations.

== Taxonomy ==
It was first described by Carl Friedrich Philipp von Martius and Joseph Gerhard Zuccarini in 1832.

=== Type specimen ===
The type specimen was collected close to Joazerio in the state of Bahia, Brazil.

=== Placement within Nymphaea ===
It is placed in Nymphaea subg. Hydrocallis.

=== Segregation of Nymphaea caatingae ===
Plant material previously believed to be Nymphaea lasiophylla was later assigned to a new species, Nymphaea caatingae.

== Etymology ==
The specific epithet lasiophylla means woolly-leaved. However, the name is misleading, as the authors mistook a layer of algae as trichomes.

== Conservation ==
Nymphaea lasiophylla may face loss of habitat, due to climate change.

== Ecology ==
=== Habitat ===
Nymphaea lasiophylla is found growing in temporary bodies of water along roadsides, in depressions in arid climate regions, in coastal lagoons, in artificial ponds, and in stagnant waters. Populations of Nymphaea lasiophylla have the ability to persist in and dominate temporary aquatic habitats. It occurs sympatrically with Nymphaea vanildae.

=== Pollination ===
It is pollinated by the beetle species Cyclocephala putrida. Beetles have been discovered trapped within flowers, which close during the day.
