= Nymphaea francae =

Scientific classification
- Kingdom: Plantae
- Clade: Tracheophytes
- Clade: Angiosperms
- Order: Nymphaeales
- Family: Nymphaeaceae
- Genus: Nymphaea
- Subgenus: Nymphaea subg. Hydrocallis
- Species: N. francae

Binomial name
- Nymphaea francae C.T.Lima & Giul.
- Nymphaea francae is endemic to Brazil

Species of water lily

Nymphaea francae is a species of waterlily endemic to Brazil.

== Description ==
=== Vegetative characteristics ===
Nymphaea francae is an aquatic herb. It has ovoid tubers, which are not stoloniferous. The floating leaves have 5–7.2 mm wide, greenish-brown, pubescent to glabrescent petioles with four primary central, and four secondary peripheral air canals. The leaf blade is ovate and has an entire, flat margin. It has actinodromous leaf venation.

=== Generative characteristics ===
The nocturnal flowers float on the water surface. They have a pubescent to glabrescent, non-brittle, greenish-brown peduncle with six central primary and twelve secondary peripheral air canals. The petals are white.

== Reproduction ==
=== Vegetative reproduction ===
Both stolons and proliferating pseudanthia are absent.

=== Generative reproduction ===
Neither fruits nor seeds have been observed.

== Taxonomy ==
It was first described by C.T.Lima and Ana Maria Giulietti in 2021.

=== Type specimen ===
The type specimen was collected by C.T. Lima and L. Lima in a lagoon on Bananal Island in the Tocantins, Brazil at a depth of 1−3 m. It is only known from the type material.

=== Placement within Nymphaea ===
It is placed in Nymphaea subg. Hydrocallis.

== Etymology ==
The specific epithet francae honours Prof. Dr. Flávio França of the State University of Feira de Santana, Brazil.

== Ecology ==
=== Habitat ===
It occurs in aquatic habitats of the central Brazilian Savanna.
