= Nymphaea belophylla =

Scientific classification
- Kingdom: Plantae
- Clade: Tracheophytes
- Clade: Angiosperms
- Order: Nymphaeales
- Family: Nymphaeaceae
- Genus: Nymphaea
- Subgenus: Nymphaea subg. Hydrocallis
- Species: N. belophylla

Binomial name
- Nymphaea belophylla Trickett

Species of water lily

Nymphaea belophylla is a species of waterlily native to Bolivia, Brazil and Venezuela.

== Description ==
=== Vegetative characteristics ===
Nymphaea belophylla is an aquatic herb. It has subglobose tubers, which are not stoloniferous. The green, elliptic-sagittate leaves with an acute apex are up to 30 cm long and 11 cm wide. The 4-5 mm wide, non-brittle, green petiole is glabrous.

=== Generative characteristics ===
The flowers of Nymphaea belophylla are floating and nocturnal. The glabrous, green, non-brittle peduncle is up to 5 mm wide. In the original publication, the flowers are describes as inodorous. In others, the floral fragrance described as sweet and fruity, or as unpleasant and almond-like. The smooth, pilose, ellipsoid seeds exhibit trichomes arranged in continuous longitudinal lines. The seeds are 0.9 mm wide and 0.75 mm wide. The trichomes are 35-90 μm long.

== Cytology ==
The chromosome count is not known.

== Reproduction ==
=== Vegetative reproduction ===
Stolons and proliferating pseudanthia are absent.

== Habitat ==
In one instance, it has been found growing in flooded grassland savanna at water depths of 110 cm beneath Tabebuia aurea trees. In another case, it was observed growing in floodplains at water depths of 1.5-2m among the grass species Oryza rufipogon and Paspalum wrightii. In the Pantanal, where it can occur sympatrically with Nymphaea oxypetala, it is found in floodplains and rivers.

== Taxonomy ==
It was first described by Trickett in 1971 based on plant material cultivated at the Royal Botanic Gardens, Kew. The plants had been introduced to cultivation by Amanda Bleher from a specimen collected in Guaporé River, Brazil.

=== Type specimen ===
The type locality is the Río Guaporé. It seemed that the type material had gone missing, however the holotype was later found again. The isotype could still not be located.

=== Placement within Nymphaea ===
It is placed in Nymphaea subg. Hydrocallis.

== Etymology ==
The species name is derived from the Greek βέλος meaning arrow or dart, and -phylla referring to the leaves. It references the strongly pointed, arrow-shaped leaves.
