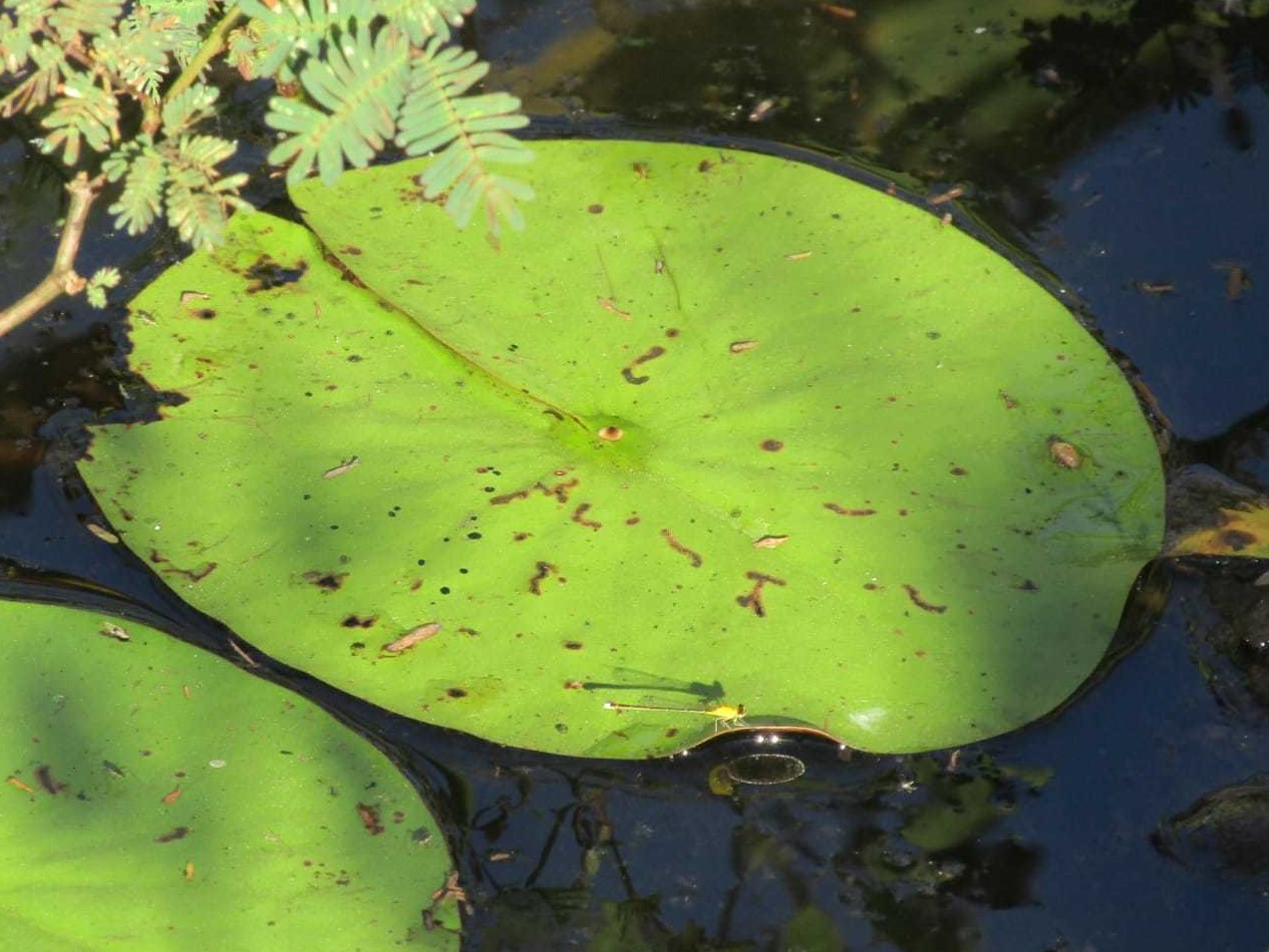

Scientific classification
- Kingdom: Plantae
- Clade: Tracheophytes
- Clade: Angiosperms
- Order: Nymphaeales
- Family: Nymphaeaceae
- Genus: Nymphaea
- Subgenus: Nymphaea subg. Hydrocallis
- Species: N. caatingae

Binomial name
- Nymphaea caatingae C.T.Lima & Giul.

= Nymphaea caatingae =

Species of water lily

Nymphaea caatingae is a species of waterlily that is endemic to north-eastern Brazil.

== Description ==
=== Vegetative characteristics ===
Nymphaea caatingae is an aquatic herb. It has stoloniferous, subglobose tubers. The floating leaves are attached to the stem by glabrous, non-brittle, 2.3–8 mm wide, green to reddish petioles, which have two primary central air canals, as well as six smaller secondary ones. The leaf blade is ovate, suborbicular to orbicular in shape and has flat and entire margins. The apex of the leathery lamina is obtuse.

=== Generative characteristics ===
Flowering occurs throughout the year. The nocturnal flowers float on the water surface. They have non-brittle, glabrous, brownish peduncles with six central primary air canals and twelve smaller secondary, peripheral ones. There is an abrupt transition from the white petals to stamens and staminodia are absent. The ellipsoid, ruminate, pilose seeds have trichomes arranged in interrupted, longitudinal lines.

== Reproduction ==
=== Vegetative reproduction ===
Proliferating pseudanthia are present, which enable rapid vegetative reproduction under volatile environmental conditions. Stolons are produced as well, but the proliferating pseudanthia are the main mode of vegetative propagation.

=== Generative reproduction ===
The nocturnal, protogynous flowers last for two days. Autogamy does not occur. Fruit set has only been observed after cross pollination.

== Taxonomy ==
It was first described by C.T.Lima and Ana Maria Giulietti in 2021.

=== Type specimen ===
The type specimen was collected by C.T. Lima on the 13th of December 2009 in the municipality Itaberaba on the road to Ipirá in the state of Bahia, Brazil.

=== Placement within Nymphaea ===
It is placed in Nymphaea subg. Hydrocallis. It is morphologically closest to Nymphaea vanildae.

== Etymology ==
The specific epithet caatingae refers to the Caatinga.

== Ecology ==
=== Habitat ===
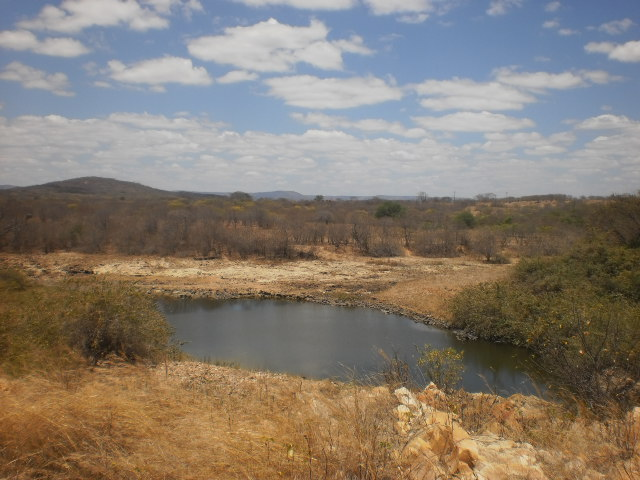
An exemplary aquatic habitat in the Caatinga of Brasil

In the Caatinga, it grows in temporary ponds, and in stagnant water. It is endemic to Brazil and occurs in the Caatinga, as well as the Atlantic rainforest.
