= Nymphaea conardii =

Scientific classification
- Kingdom: Plantae
- Clade: Tracheophytes
- Clade: Angiosperms
- Order: Nymphaeales
- Family: Nymphaeaceae
- Genus: Nymphaea
- Subgenus: Nymphaea subg. Hydrocallis
- Species: N. conardii

Binomial name
- Nymphaea conardii Wiersema

Species of water lily

Nymphaea conardii is a species of waterlily native to the region spanning from Southern Mexico to tropical South America.

== Description ==
=== Vegetative characteristics ===
Nymphaea conardii is an aquatic herb with ovoid, 4.5 cm wide rhizomes. The ovate-elliptical leaf blade is uniformly green, and it can reach up to 18 cm in length and 14 cm in width. The leaf venation is reticulate and dichotomous, with 9-15 primary veins. The leaf blade is attached to glabrous, max. 4 mm wide petioles with 2-4 primary and 4-6 secondary air canals.

=== Generative characteristics ===
The nocturnal flowers float on the water surface. The flowers have glabrous, non-brittle green peduncles with 5-6 primary, central air canals and 10-12 secondary, smaller, peripheral canals. The flowers have uniformly green, 3-6 cm long and 1-3 cm wide, oblong-ovate sepals with an slightly rounded or acute apex. The fruits are 1.5-1.7 cm long and 2.5-2.9 cm wide. The granulose, pilose, ellipsoid seeds have trichomes arranged in interrupted, longitudinal lines. The trichomes are 10–60 μm long.

== Cytology ==
The diploid chromosome count is 2n = 28.

== Reproduction ==
=== Vegetative reproduction ===
It is stoloniferous, but only in a brief period in which the tubers resume growth. Proliferating pseudanthia are absent.

=== Generative reproduction ===
Autogamy is possible, as the stigma retains its female function in the second day, when the pollen is released, thus enabling self-fertilization. The seed dispersal is hydrochorous (i.e. water-dispersed) or ornithochorous (i.e. bird-dispersed).

== Taxonomy ==
=== Publication ===
It was first described by Wiersema in 1984.

=== Type specimen ===
The type specimen was collected on the 29th of August 1981 by J.H. Wiersema and A. Gonzalez from a pond in the Sosa Municipality of Barinas, Venezuela.

=== Placement within Nymphaea ===
It is placed in Nymphaea subg. Hydrocallis. It is closely related to Nymphaea gardneriana, Nymphaea glandulifera, and Nymphaea jamesoniana.

== Etymology ==
The specific epithet conardii honours the botanist Henry Shoemaker Conard (1874 - 1971).

== Conservation ==
Nymphaea conardii is considered to be vulnerable (VU) in Cuba.

== Ecology ==
=== Habitat ===
It inhabits flooded savannas, shallow lagoons, and Morichales associated with still water (i.e. wetlands characterized by the presence of the moriche palm Mauritia flexuosa) at elevations of 0-200 m above sea level. It is also found in ponds and temporary ditches.

=== Pollination ===
It is pollinated by beetles.
