= Nymphaea harleyi =

Scientific classification
- Kingdom: Plantae
- Clade: Tracheophytes
- Clade: Angiosperms
- Order: Nymphaeales
- Family: Nymphaeaceae
- Genus: Nymphaea
- Subgenus: Nymphaea subg. Hydrocallis
- Species: N. harleyi

Binomial name
- Nymphaea harleyi C.T.Lima & Giul.
- Nymphaea harleyi is endemic to Brazil

Species of water lily

Nymphaea harleyi is a species of waterlily endemic to Brazil.

== Description ==
=== Vegetative characteristics ===
Nymphaea harleyi is an aquatic herb with cylindrical tubers, which are not stoloniferous. The leaf blades float on the water surface. It is ovate and has an entire and flat margin. It has actinodromous leaf venation. The 9.3−15.2 cm long and 6.5−10 cm wide leaf blades are attached to 2−4 mm wide petioles with four major, two medium, and 8 minor peripheral air canals.

=== Generative characteristics ===
The nocturnal flowers float on the water surface. The flowers have peduncles with five primary central and ten secondary peripheral air canals. The gynoecium is syncarpous and consists of 27−35 carpels. The clavate appendix of the carpels have an obtuse to rounded apex.

== Reproduction ==
=== Vegetative reproduction ===
Both stolons and proliferating pseudanthia are absent.

=== Generative reproduction ===
Neither fruits nor seeds have been observed.

== Taxonomy ==
It was first described by C.T.Lima and Ana Maria Giulietti in 2021.

=== Type specimen ===
The type specimen was collected by C.T. Lima, R. Machado, A.M. Giulietti and R.M. Harley on 3 February 2012 in Tocantins, Brazil.

=== Placement within Nymphaea ===
It is placed in Nymphaea subg. Hydrocallis.

== Etymology ==
The specific epithet harleyi honours Prof. Dr. Raymond M. Harley of the Royal Botanic Gardens, Kew.
