= Nymphaea vanildae =

Scientific classification
- Kingdom: Plantae
- Clade: Tracheophytes
- Clade: Angiosperms
- Order: Nymphaeales
- Family: Nymphaeaceae
- Genus: Nymphaea
- Subgenus: Nymphaea subg. Hydrocallis
- Species: N. vanildae

Binomial name
- Nymphaea vanildae C.T.Lima & Giul.
- Nymphaea vanildae is endemic to Brazil

Species of water lily

Nymphaea vanildae is a species of waterlily endemic to Pernambuco, Brazil.

== Description ==
=== Vegetative characteristics ===
Nymphaea vanildae is an aquatic herb with cylindrical tubers, which are likely not stoloniferous. The roots are contractile.

=== Generative characteristics ===
The strongly brittle, brownish, glabrous peduncle has five primary central and ten secondary peripheral air canals. The androecium consists of 98–100 stamens. The outer lanceolate, 4.2–4.4 cm long and 1–1.1 cm wide stamens have white filaments. The inner stamens measure 2.1–2.4 cm × 1.9–2.2 mm, with reddish-purple filaments. The outer stamens have white to yellow-green, 0.2–0.4 mm long terminal extensions of the filament. The inner stamens do not have these extensions. The yellowish-white anthers are 3.5–5 mm long in the outer stamens and 5–7 mm long in the inner ones. Staminoids are absent. The gynoecium consists of 21-25 carpels with flat, linear, 7.5–9.0 mm long and 2.0–2.8 mm wide appendages with a rounded apex. The apex and base is cream-coloured, while the remaining parts display a reddish-purple colouration.

== Reproduction ==
=== Vegetative reproduction ===
Stolons were not observed, but Nymphaea vanildae reproduces vegetatively through proliferating pseudanthia.

=== Generative reproduction ===
No fruits have been observed.

== Taxonomy ==
It was first described by C.T.Lima and Ana Maria Giulietti in 2013.

=== Type specimen ===
The type specimen of Nymphaea vanildae was collected by C.T. Lima and L. Lima in Lagoa Grande, Pernambuco, Brazil, 50 km from the municipality of Petrolina, on the 23rd of April 2011.

=== Placement within Nymphaea ===
It is placed in Nymphaea subg. Hydrocallis.

== Etymology ==
The specific epithet vanildae honours Maria Vanilda Morais Oliveira of the State University of Feira de Santana.

== Conservation ==
It is thought to be critically endangered (CR). Its fragmented habitat is only about 100 km^{2} (39 sq mi) in size.

== Ecology ==
=== Habitat ===
It occurs in the aquatic habitats of the Brazilian Caatinga. It occurs in temporary lagoons.
