= Nymphaea prolifera =

- Preserved specimen of Nymphaea prolifera Wiersema in the collection of the Muséum national d’Histoire naturelle, Paris (France)

Scientific classification
- Kingdom: Plantae
- Clade: Tracheophytes
- Clade: Angiosperms
- Order: Nymphaeales
- Family: Nymphaeaceae
- Genus: Nymphaea
- Subgenus: Nymphaea subg. Hydrocallis
- Species: N. prolifera

Binomial name
- Nymphaea prolifera Wiersema

Species of water lily

Nymphaea prolifera is a species of waterlily naturally found from Mexico (specifically Veracruz and Tabasco) to Brazil and northeastern Argentina. Additionally, it has been reported to occur in Uruguay.

== Description ==
=== Vegetative characteristics ===
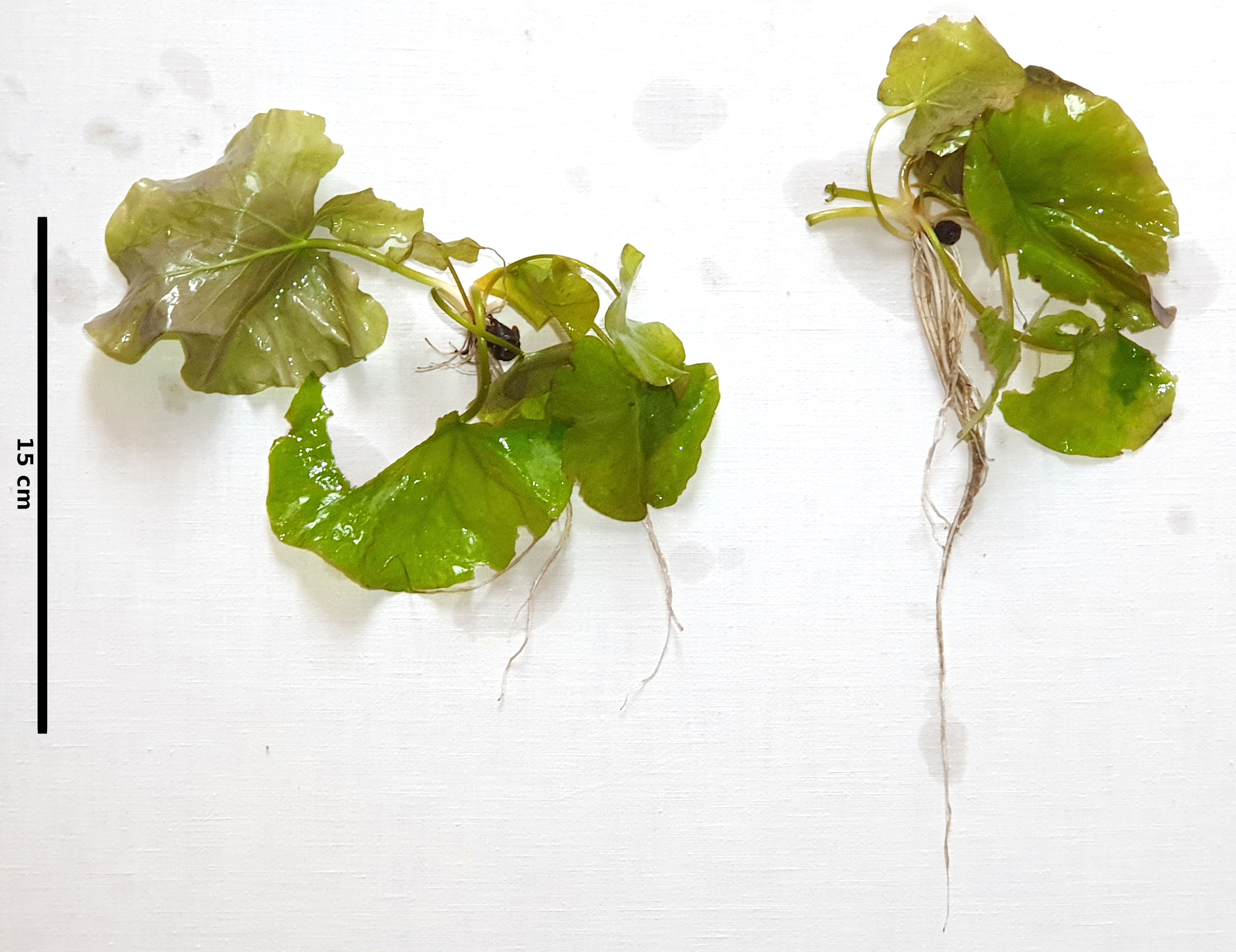
Two young plants growing from the detached rhizomes of the proliferating pseudanthium

Nymphaea prolifera is a perennial aquatic herb.

=== Generative characteristics ===
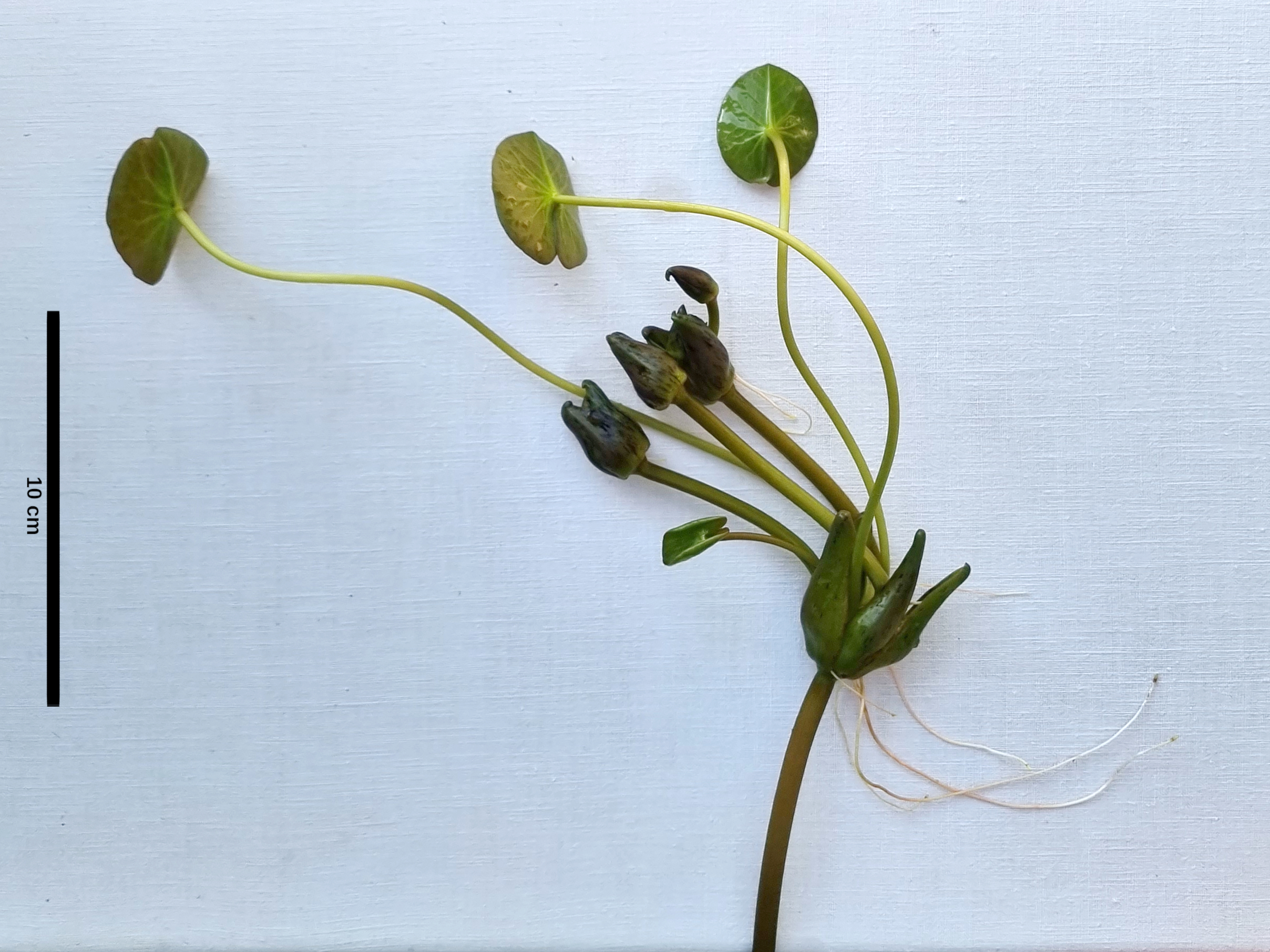
Proliferating pseudanthium or tubiferous flower of Nymphaea prolifera Wiersema

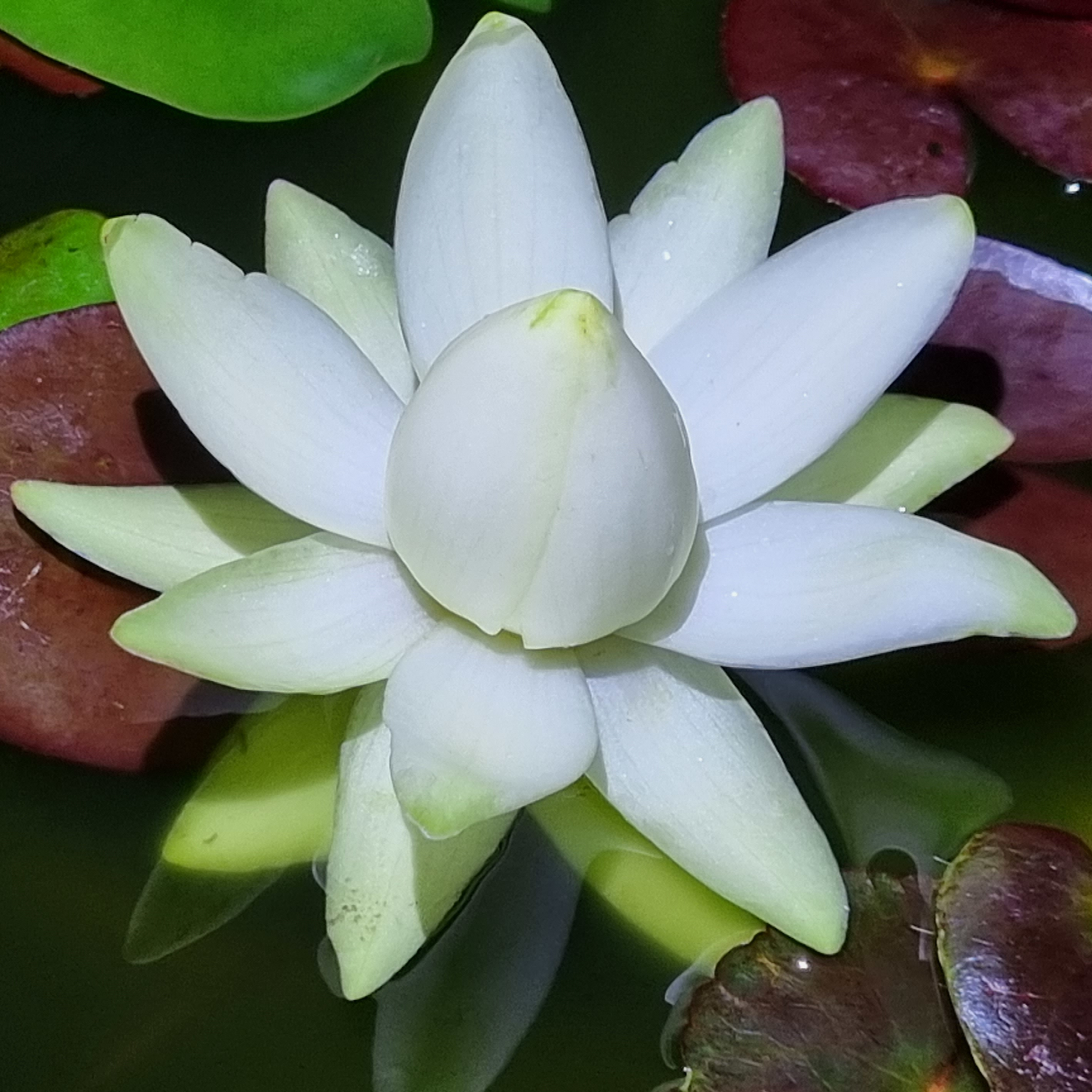
Side view of opening Nymphaea prolifera Wiersema flower

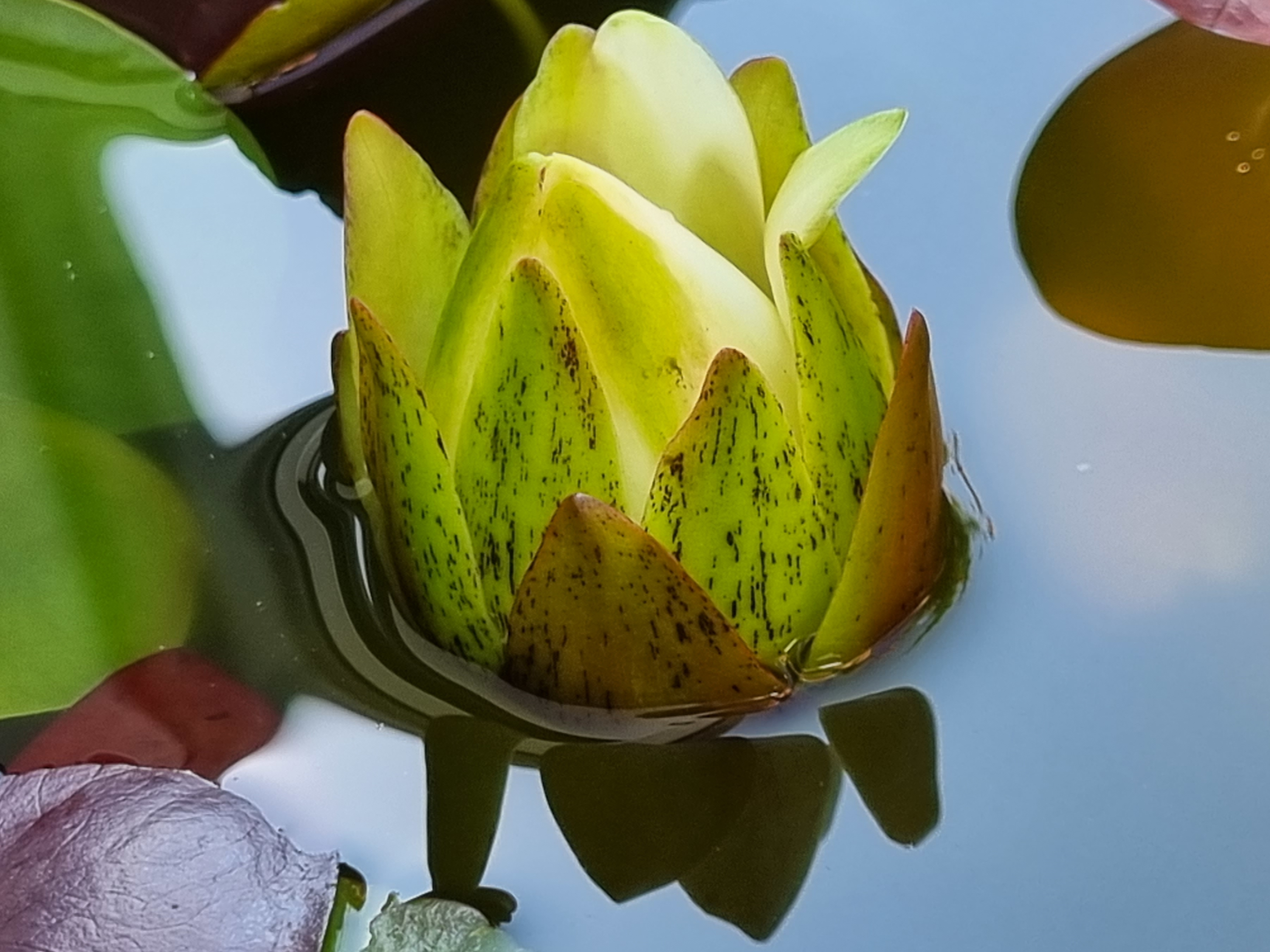
Closing Nymphaea prolifera Wiersema flower during daytime floating on the water surface

The floral odour has been described as musty.

=== Cytology ===
Nymphaea prolifera is aneuploid. The chromosome count is 2n = 18.

== Reproduction ==
Fruits and seeds are only produced on very rare occasions. Instead, the main form of reproduction relies on the sterile, tubiferous flowers as a form of vegetative reproduction. Due to those vegetative propagules, it can persist through periods of decay. The tubers readily separate and it is common to see numerous floating tubers in the water. They drift briefly in the water, until they establish roots to anchor themselves in the mud. When the water level declines, the tubers are likely embedded within the substrate.

== Taxonomy ==
Nymphaea prolifera was first described by John Harry Wiersema in 1984. It is placed in the subgenus Nymphaea subg. Hydrocallis.

=== Etymology ===
The specific epithet prolifera references its distinctive trait of proliferous asexual reproduction.

== Conservation ==
It is a rare species.

== Ecology ==
=== Pollination ===
The flowers are likely entomophilous (i.e. insect-pollinated).

=== Habitat ===
In Mexico, Nymphaea prolifera was collected in temporarily flooded meadows at the roadside, at depths of 30 to 60 cm. The populations appear shortly after the onset of the rainy season. Its habitat within the Pantanal consists of flooded clay fields. It is also found in swamps, temporary ponds, pastures.

=== Herbivory ===
This species experiences low levels of herbivory in the growth period. This may be explained by a high tannin content of 5.40%, as tannins are known to reduce insect herbivory. Few occurrences of adult Hydrotimetes natans beetles, which are being used as a biological control agent of Cabomba caroliniana in Australia, have been observed on Nymphaea prolifera in its natural habitat. In a laboratory setting, it was shown that adult beetles can feed on Nymphaea prolifera leaves, although it prefers Cabomba caroliniana. The beetle larvae are host specific to Cabomba and fails to enter stems of Nymphaea prolifera. The feeding behaviour of a different beetle species Neochetina eichhorniae was also evaluated. Despite the high nitrogen and low lignin contents of Nymphaea prolifera foliage, the beetle showed a low preference for Nymphaea prolifera as a food source and it is unlikely this beetle would feed on Nymphaea prolifera under natural conditions. In its natural habitat, 13.3% of leaves had petioles damaged by endophagous larva.

Nymphaea prolifera synthesises methylated benzenoids to repel waterlily aphids, which feed on the flowers.

== Cultivation ==
It is rarely cultivated.
