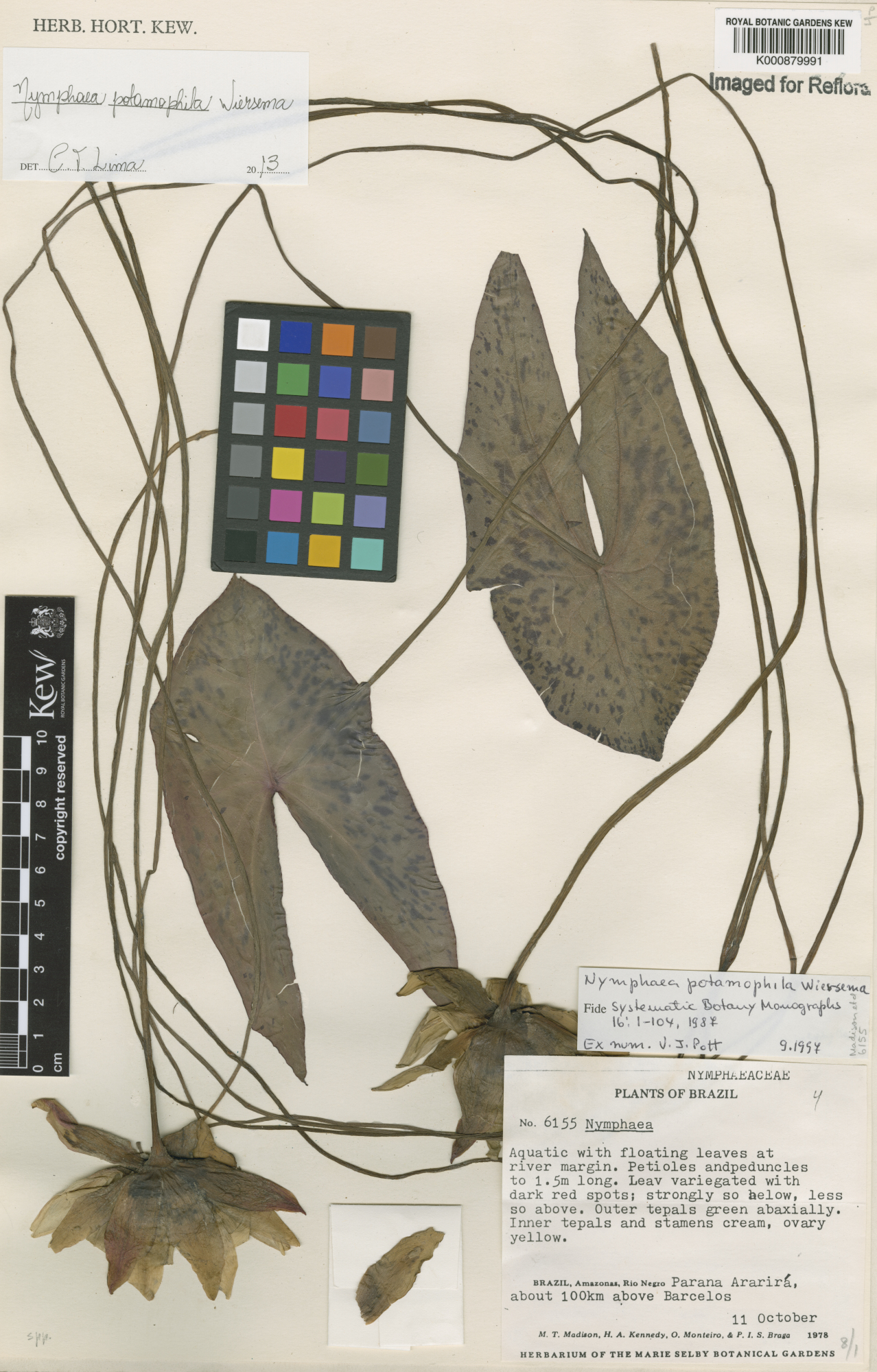
- Preserved herbarium specimen of Nymphaea potamophila Wiersema in the collection of the Royal Botanic Gardens, Kew

Scientific classification
- Kingdom: Plantae
- Clade: Embryophytes
- Clade: Tracheophytes
- Clade: Spermatophytes
- Clade: Angiosperms
- Order: Nymphaeales
- Family: Nymphaeaceae
- Genus: Nymphaea
- Subgenus: Nymphaea subg. Hydrocallis
- Species: N. potamophila

Binomial name
- Nymphaea potamophila Wiersema
- It is native to Venezuela and northern Brazil

= Nymphaea potamophila =

Species of water lily

Nymphaea potamophila is a species of waterlily native to the region spanning from Venezuela to northern Brazil. Additionally, it has been reported to occur in Colombia.

== Description ==
=== Vegetative characteristics ===
Nymphaea potamophila is an aquatic herb. The elliptic-sagittate, papery leaf blades of floating leaves are up to 20 cm long and 10 cm wide. The leaf margin is entire and flat. The adaxial surface is coloured in green with overlaying patterns of red variegation. The abaxial surface has a greenish base colour accompanied by dark red variegation, but also exhibits patterns of branched, rusty-brown striations. The leaf structure is compact and the leaves are very thin (145.50 μm). This gives the leaves cold tolerance. The glabrous, 3 mm wide petioles are very long and can exceed 4 m in length.

=== Generative characteristics ===
The nocturnal floating flowers are connected to glabrous, 4 mm wide peduncles, which can exceed 4 m in length.

== Cytology ==
The chloroplast genome size is 159,232 bp. The chromosome count is unknown.

== Reproduction ==
=== Vegetative reproduction ===
Proliferating pseudanthia are not formed in this species.

=== Generative reproduction ===
High levels of both pollen viability and seed production are evident in Nymphaea potamophila. Sexual reproduction plays a significant role in this species.

== Habitat ==
It can be found in the aquatic habitats of the Amazon Rainforest, where it can grow along river margins in up to 4-5 m deep water.

== Taxonomy ==
=== Type specimen ===
The type specimen was collected in Brazil by a team of scientists consisting of J. Ramos, C.D. Mota, L.A. Maia, and E. Soares on the 28th of June 1979.

=== Placement within Nymphaea ===
It is placed in Nymphaea subg. Hydrocallis.

== Conservation ==
The conservation status of this species in Brazil has not yet been evaluated.
