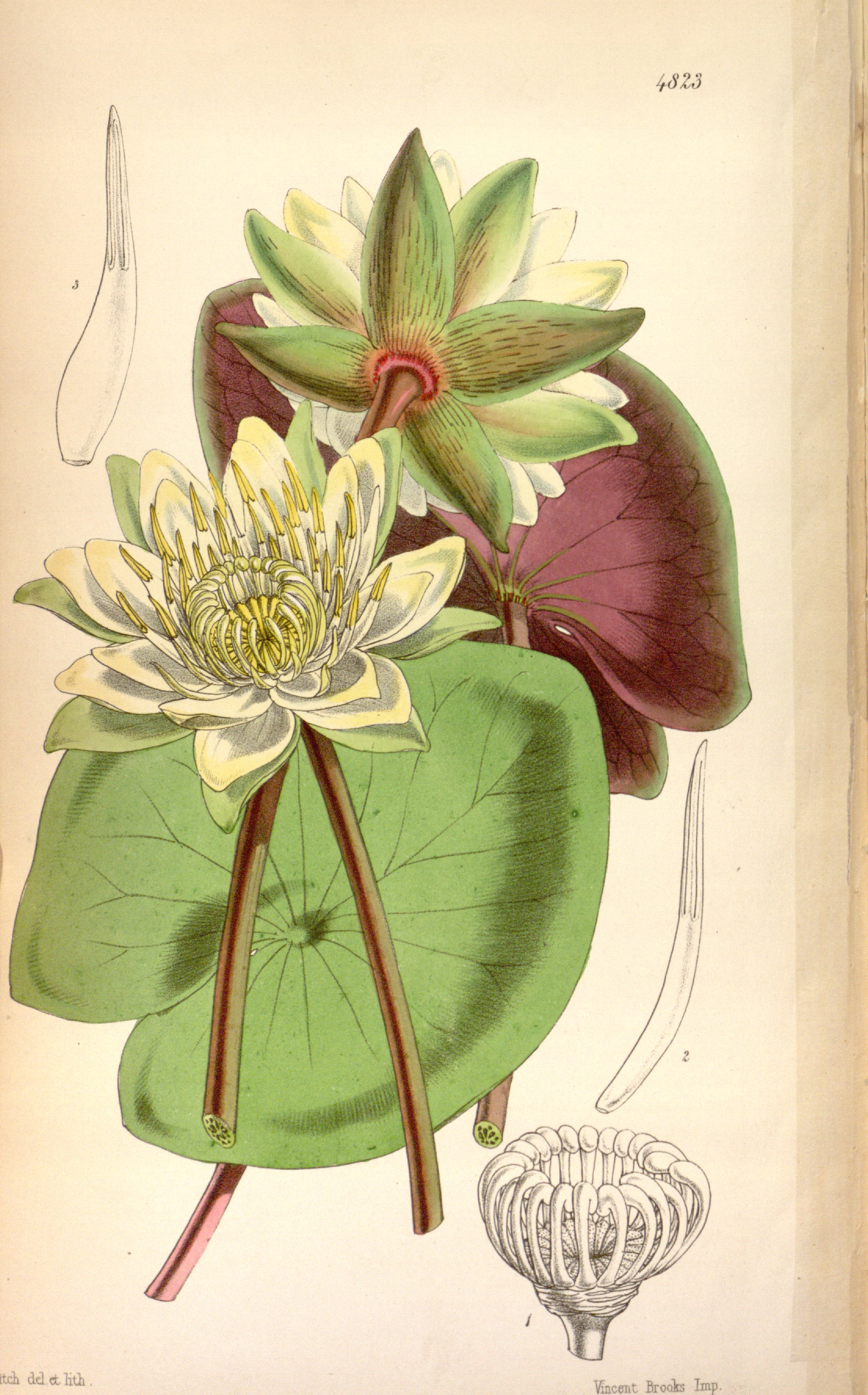
- Botanical illustration of Nymphaea amazonum

Scientific classification
- Kingdom: Plantae
- Clade: Tracheophytes
- Clade: Angiosperms
- Order: Nymphaeales
- Family: Nymphaeaceae
- Genus: Nymphaea
- Subgenus: Nymphaea subg. Hydrocallis (Planch.) Conard

Type species
- Nymphaea amazonum Mart. & Zucc.

Species
- See here

Synonyms
- Nymphaea sect. Hydrocallis Planch.; Nymphaea subsect. Hydrocallis (Planch.) Casp.

= Nymphaea subg. Hydrocallis =

Subgenus of flowering plants

Nymphaea subg. Hydrocallis is a subgenus of the genus Nymphaea.

== Description ==
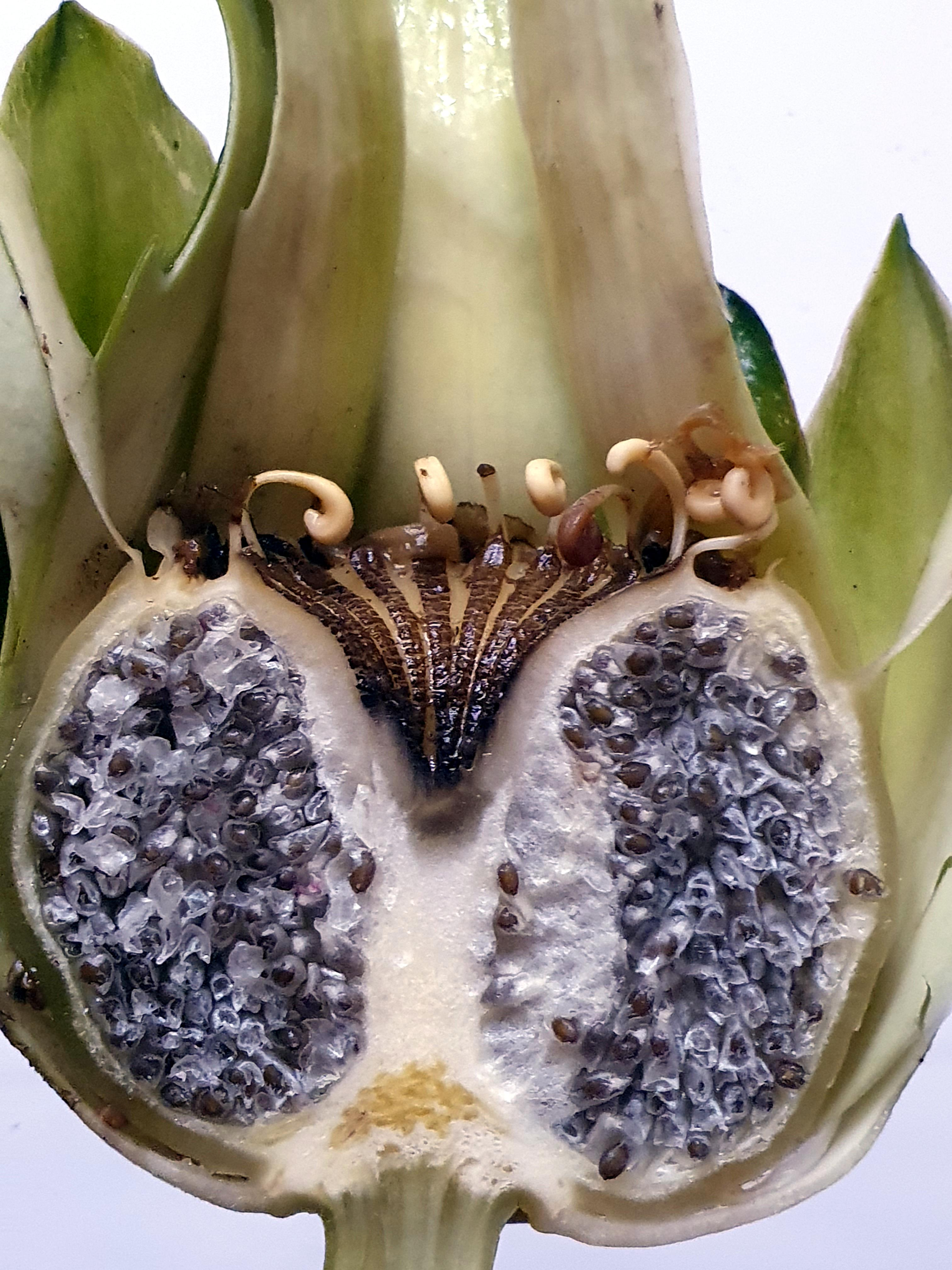
Nymphaea rudgeana G.Mey. fruit with characteristic carpellary appendages

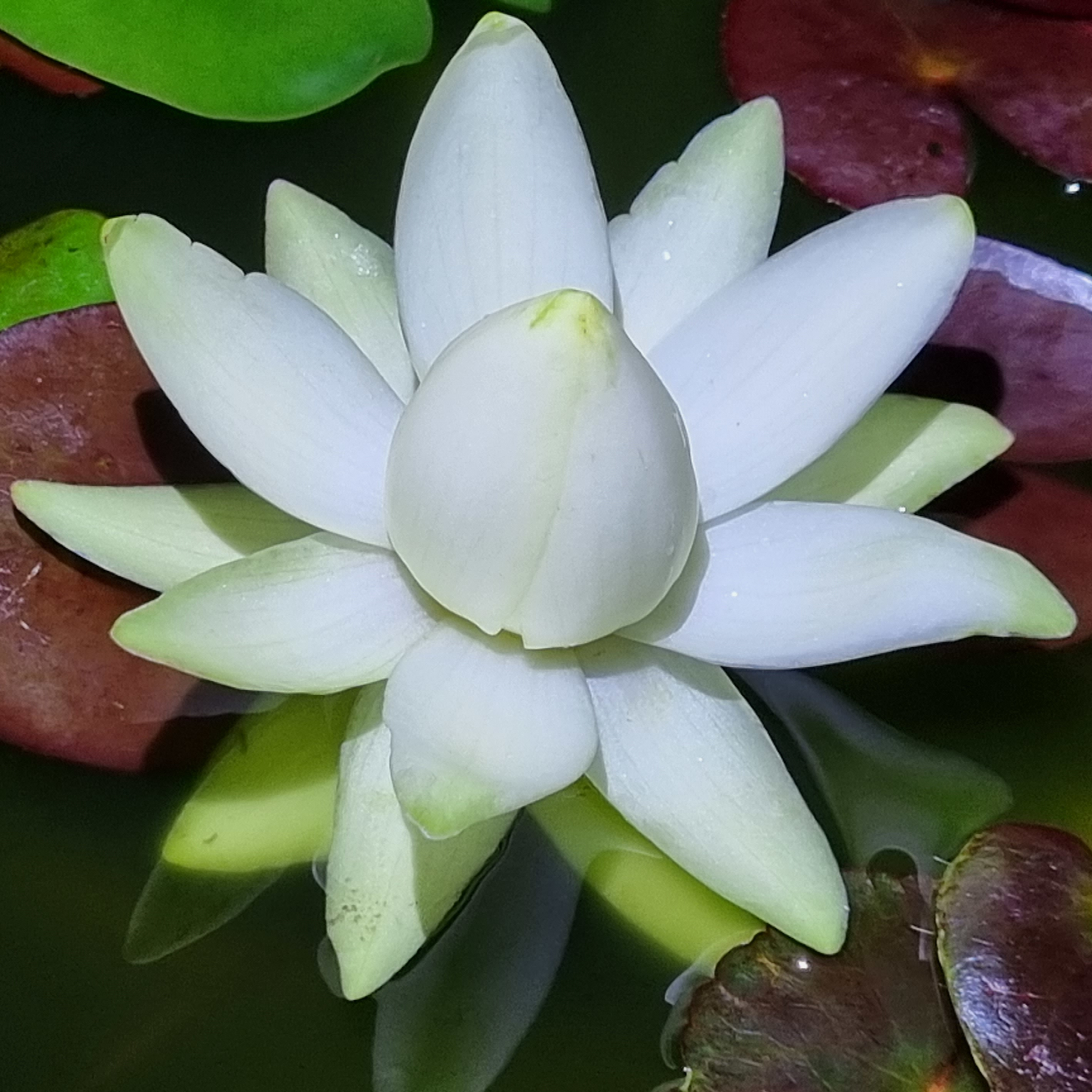
Side view of nocturnal opening Nymphaea prolifera Wiersema flower

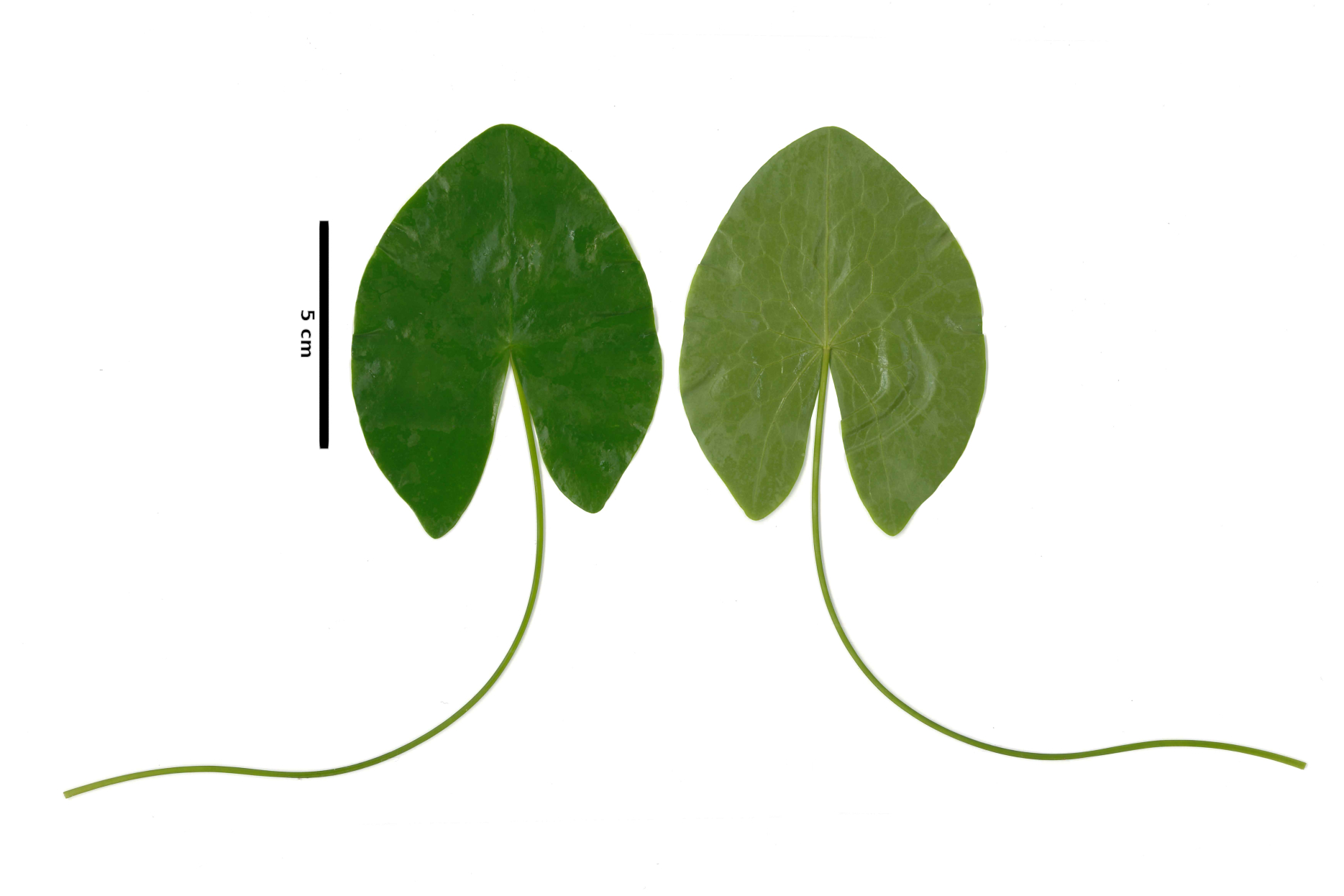
Floating leaf of Nymphaea glandulifera Rodschied with scale bar (5 cm) on a white background. The adaxial leaf surface is on the left side, and the abaxial leaf surface is on the right side.

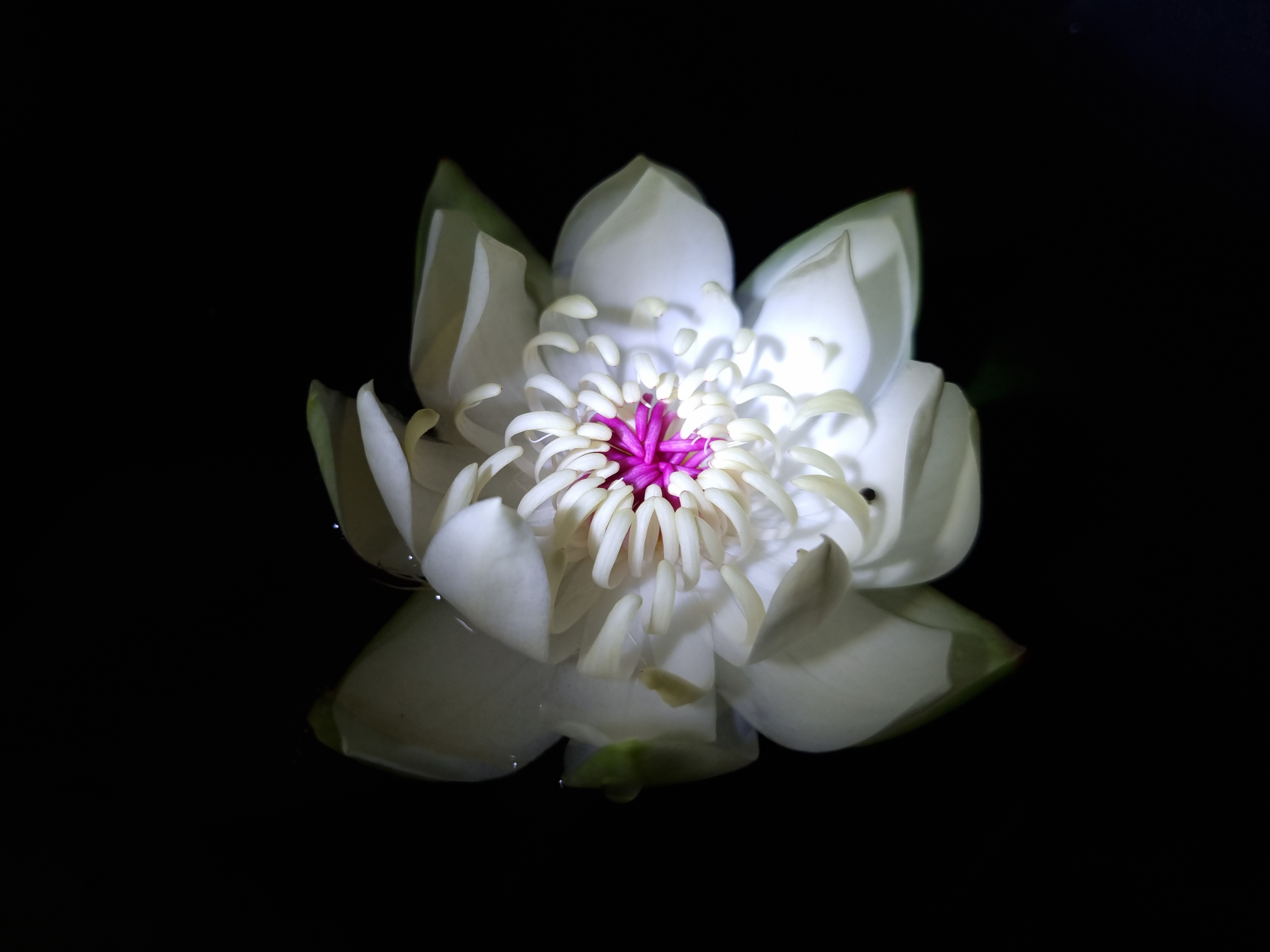
Flower of the unidentified species Nymphaea sp. Peru Puerto Maldonado

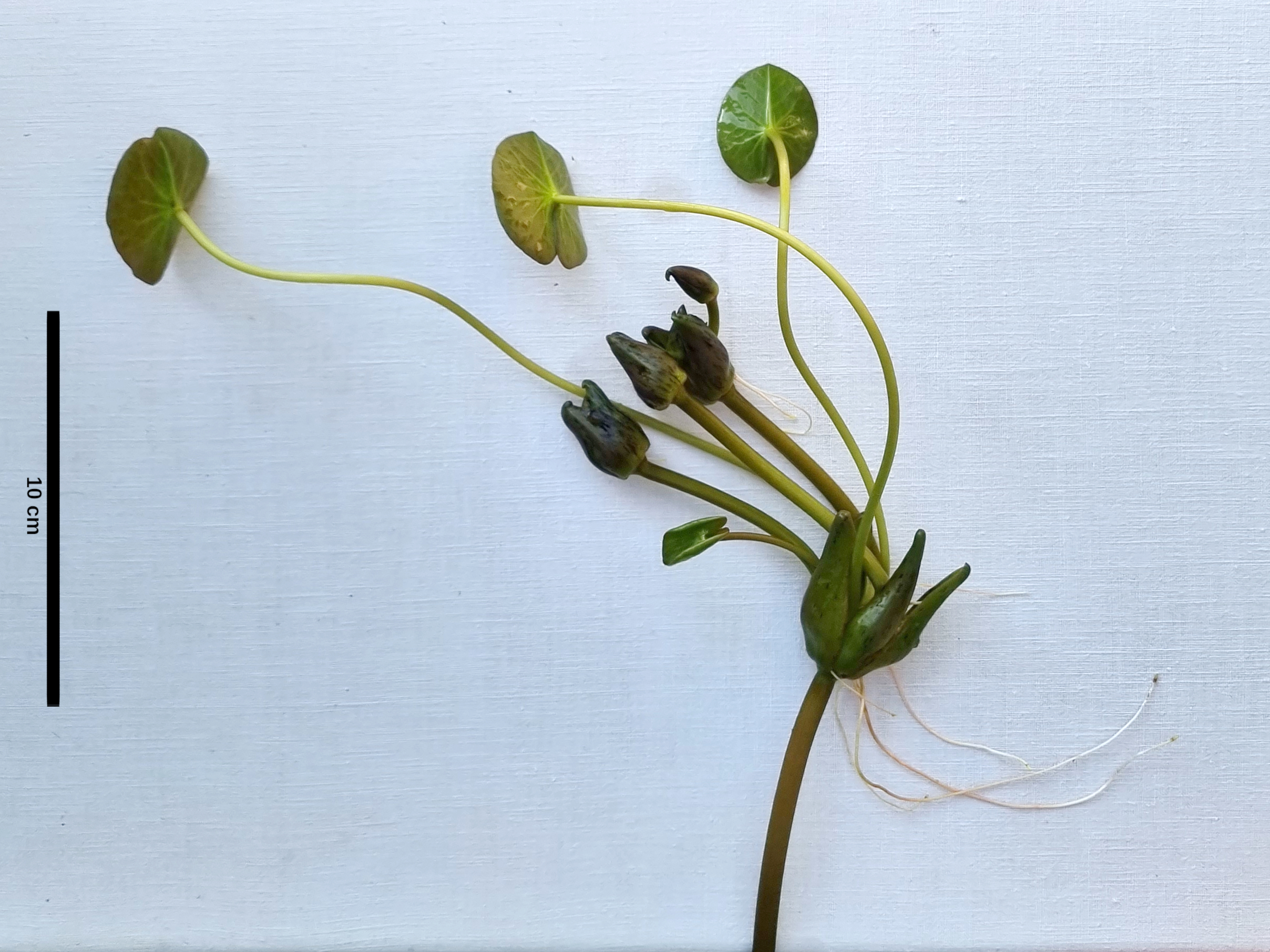
Proliferating pseudanthium or tubiferous flower of Nymphaea prolifera Wiersema

=== Vegetative characteristics ===
Species of Nymphaea subg. Hydrocallis are perennial, rhizomatous, aquatic herbs with contractile roots. The floating, petiolate leaves are orbicular to elliptic and have an entire margin.

=== Generative characteristics ===
The flowers are nocturnal and float on the water surface. The carpels have enlarged, clavate carpellary appendages. The flowers emit solvent-like, pungent, fermented, or fruity fragrances.

== Taxonomy ==
=== Publication ===
It was first described as Nymphaea sect. Hydrocallis Planch. by Jules Émile Planchon in 1853. Later, it was elevated to the status of the subgenus Nymphaea subg. Hydrocallis (Planch.) Conard by Henry Shoemaker Conard in 1905.

=== Species ===
- Nymphaea amazonum Mart. & Zucc.
- Nymphaea belophylla Trickett
- Nymphaea caatingae C.T.Lima & Giul.
- Nymphaea conardii Wiersema
- Nymphaea francae C.T.Lima & Giul.
- Nymphaea gardneriana Planch.
- Nymphaea glandulifera Rodschied
- Nymphaea harleyi C.T.Lima & Giul.
- Nymphaea jamesoniana Planch.
- Nymphaea lasiophylla Mart. & Zucc.
- Nymphaea lingulata Wiersema
- Nymphaea novogranatensis Wiersema
- Nymphaea oxypetala Planch.
- Nymphaea paganuccii C.T.Lima & Giul.
- Nymphaea pedersenii (Wiersema) C.T.Lima & Giul.
- Nymphaea potamophila Wiersema
- Nymphaea prolifera Wiersema
- Nymphaea rapinii C.T.Lima & Giul.
- Nymphaea rudgeana G.Mey.
- Nymphaea tenuinervia Casp.
- Nymphaea vanildae C.T.Lima & Giul.

== Distribution ==
The distribution of species within this subgenus extends from the southern United States through Central America, and the Caribbean to South America.

== Ecology ==
=== Pollination ===
Flowers of Nymphaea subg. Hydrocallis are pollinated by Cyclocephala beetles.
