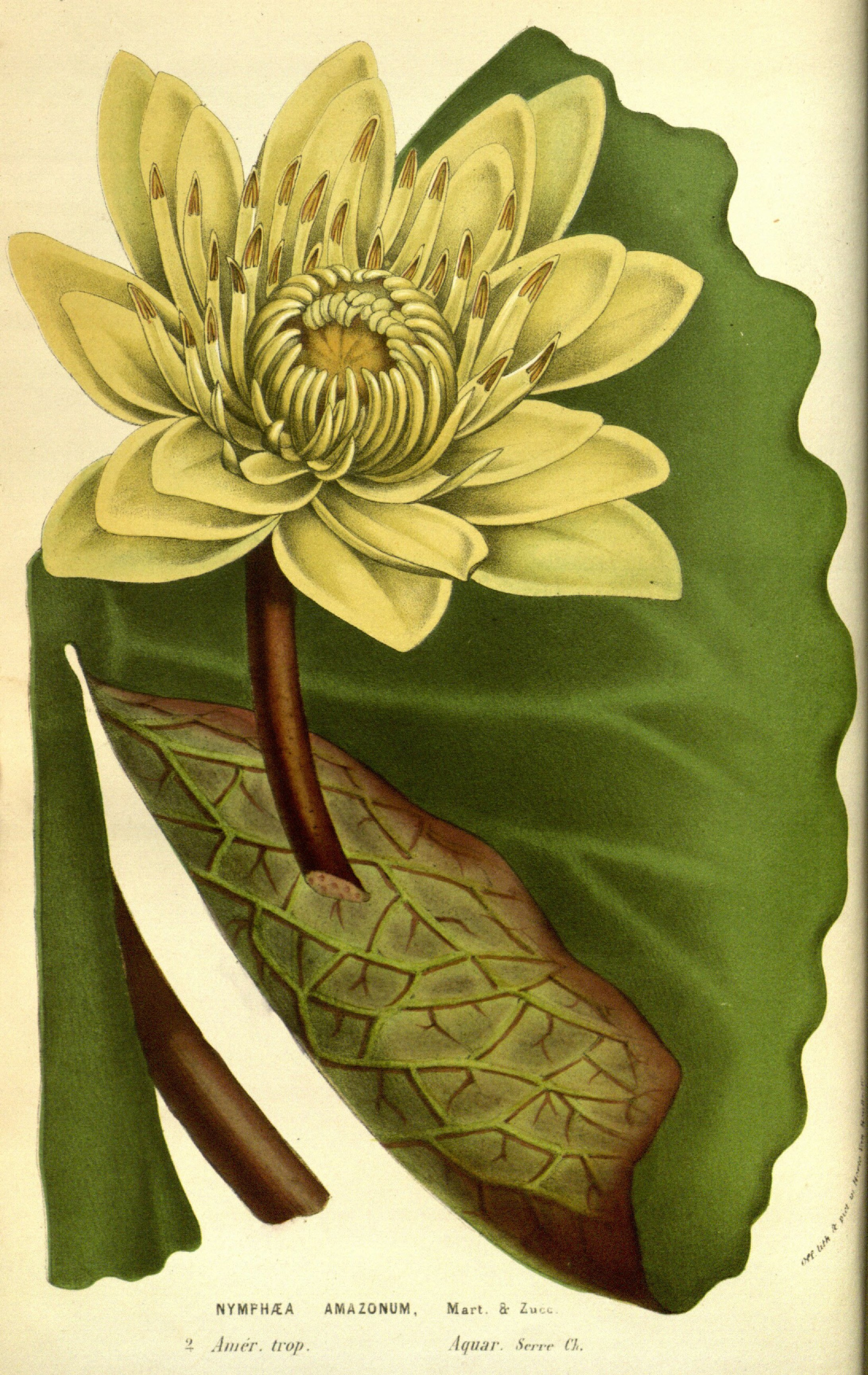

Scientific classification
- Kingdom: Plantae
- Clade: Tracheophytes
- Clade: Angiosperms
- Order: Nymphaeales
- Family: Nymphaeaceae
- Genus: Nymphaea
- Subgenus: Nymphaea subg. Hydrocallis
- Species: N. amazonum

Binomial name
- Nymphaea amazonum Mart. & Zucc.

Synonyms
- Castalia amazonum (Mart. & Zucc.) Britton & P.Wilson; Leuconymphaea amazonum (Mart. & Zucc.) Kuntze; Nymphaea blanda f. amazonum (Mart. & Zucc.) Planch.; Nymphaea rudgeana var. amazonum (Mart. & Zucc.) Griseb.; Leuconymphaea goudotiana (Planch.) Kuntze; Nymphaea alboviridis A.St.-Hil.; Nymphaea amazonum var. forma-submersa Sagot; Nymphaea amazonum f. goudotiana (Planch.) Casp.; Nymphaea amazonum var. goudotiana (Planch.) Conard; Nymphaea blanda Hook.; Nymphaea foetida Gardner ex Planch.; Nymphaea goudotiana Planch.; Nymphaea integrifolia Salzm. ex Planch.; Nymphaea nocturna March ex Hook.

= Nymphaea amazonum =

Species of water lily

Nymphaea amazonum is a species of water lily native to the region spanning from Mexico to tropical South America. It has been introduced to Bangladesh.

== Description ==
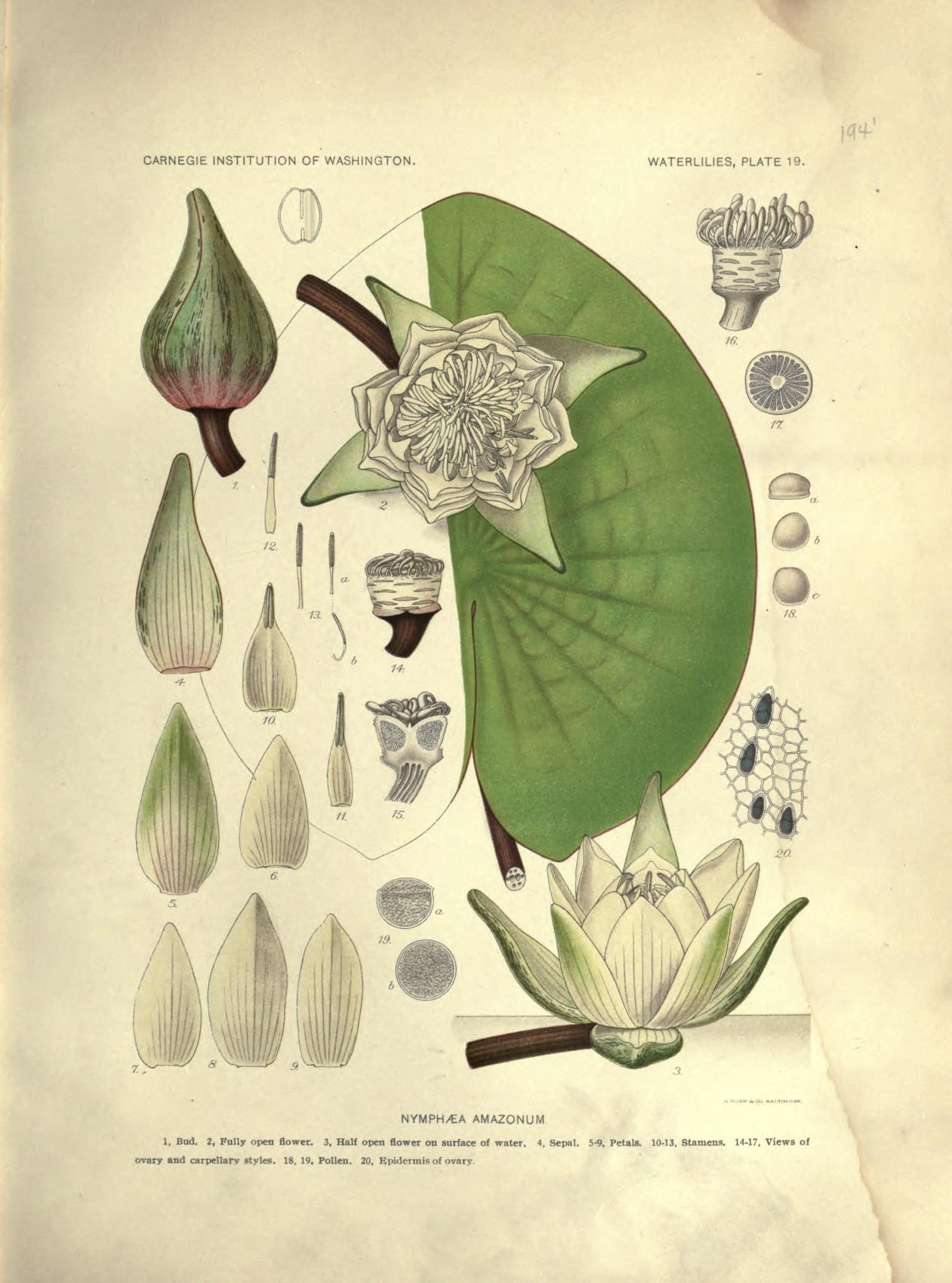
Botanical illustration of Nymphaea amazonum from "The waterlilies: a monograph of the genus Nymphaea" by Henry Shoemaker Conard

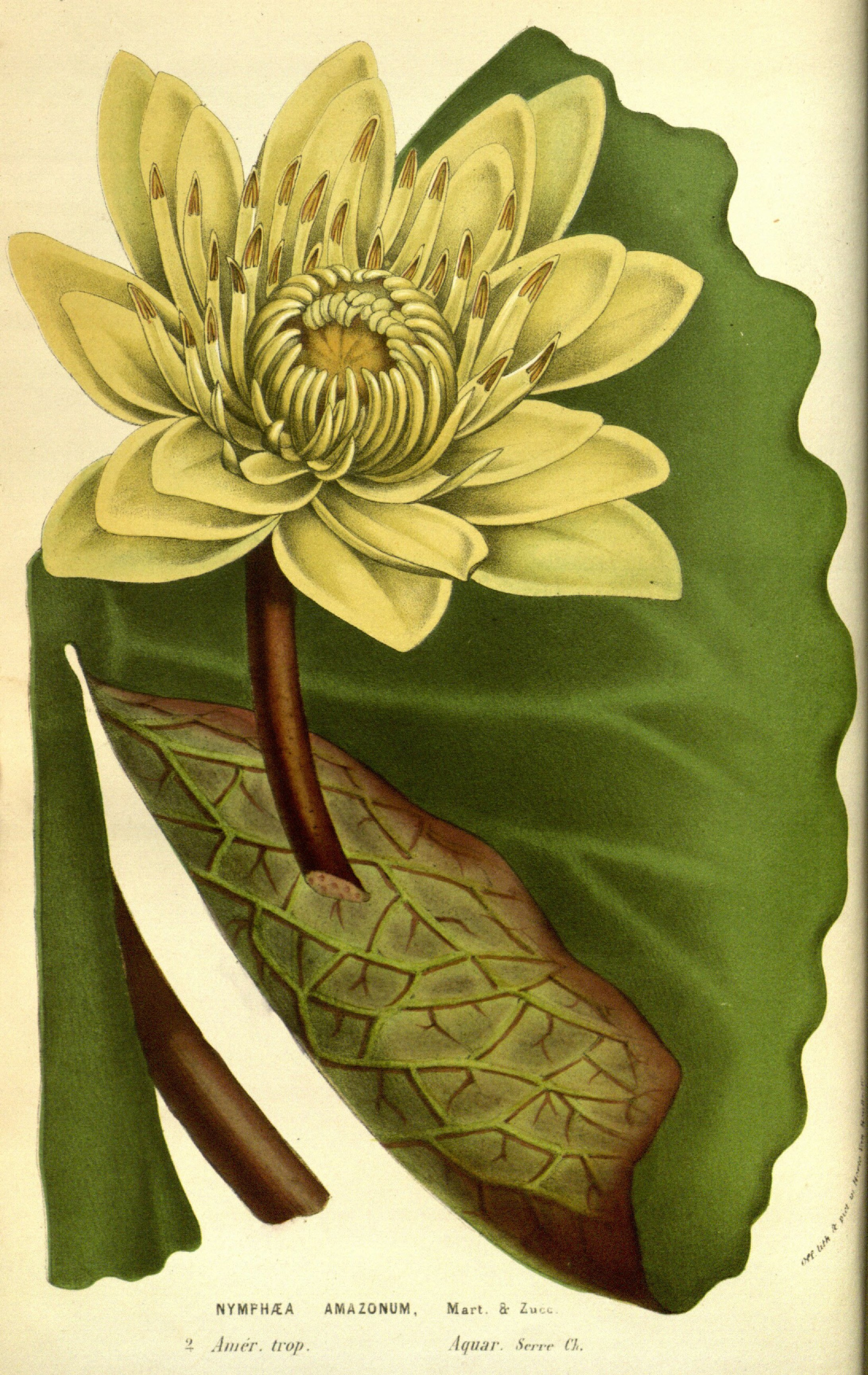
Botanical illustration of Nymphaea amazonum

=== Vegetative characteristics ===
Nymphaea amazonum is an aquatic herb. It has dark brown to black, subcylindrical rhizomes, which can reach lengths of 10 centimetres (3.9 in) and widths of 3 centimetres (1.2 in). The broadly ovate-elliptic leaf blade reaches 32 centimetres (13 in) in length and 26 centimetres (10 in) in width. The actinodromous venation on the abaxial side of the mature leaf features strongly prominent and rounded veins. The petiole is up to 8 mm wide and exhibits a ring of trichomes towards the apex.

=== Generative characteristics ===
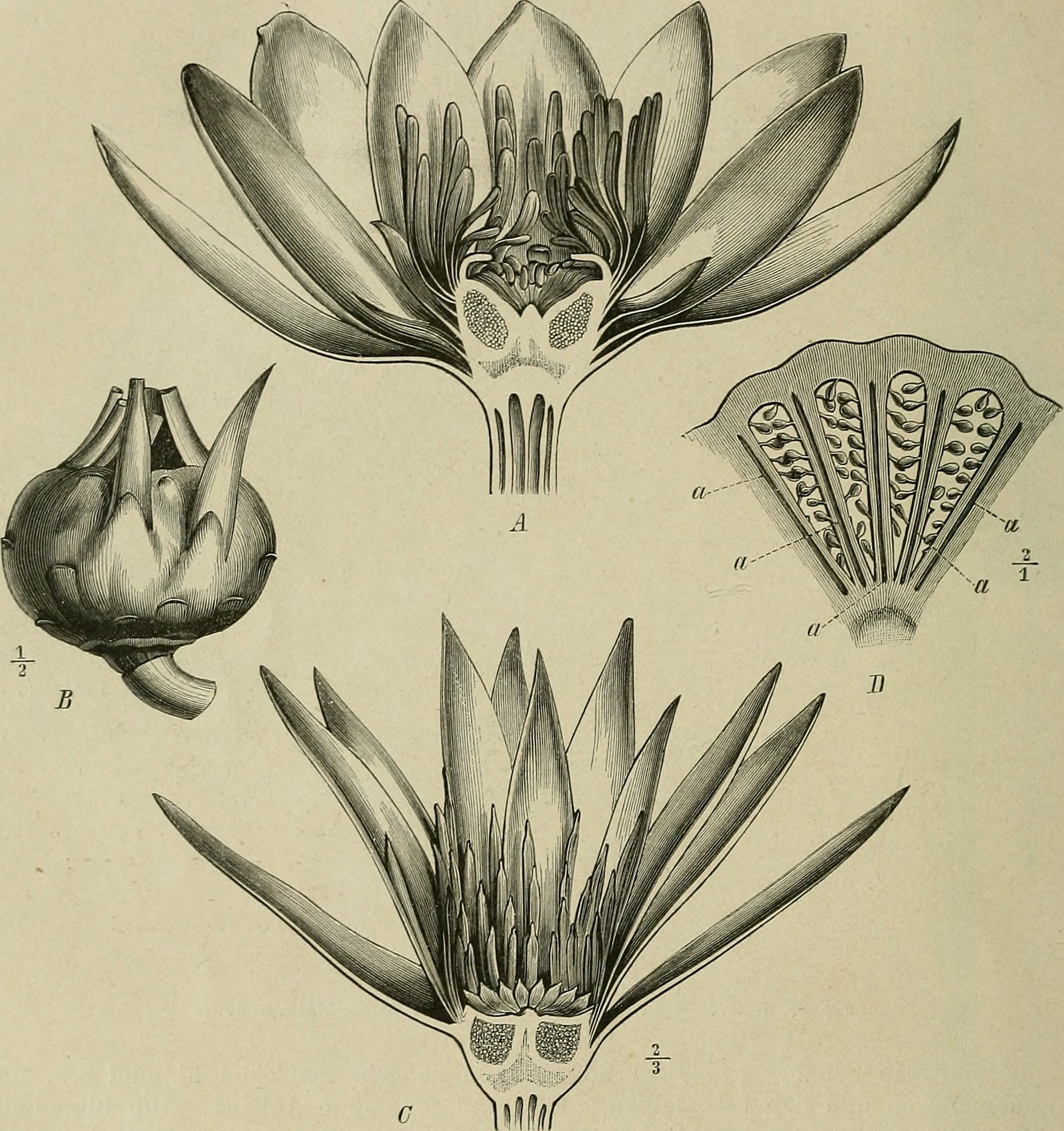
Botanical illustration of Nymphaea amazonum from the publication "Die Natürlichen Pflanzenfamilien : nebst ihren Gattungen und wichtigeren Arten, insbesondere den Nutzpflanzen"

The nocturnal flowers float on the water surface. They are attached to 10 mm wide peduncles, which rarely exhibit a ring of trichomes towards the apex. The floral fragrance has been characterised as very pleasant. The fragrance is also said to resemble petrol, xylol, benzene, PDB, turpentine, benzol, xylene, and acetone. Fruits are produced very frequently. Up to 22000 seeds are found in a single fruit. The ovoid seeds are 1.3 mm long and 0.9 mm wide. They are smooth, pilose and exhibit trichomes in continuous longitudinal lines.

== Cytology ==
The diploid chromosome count is 2n = 18.

== Reproduction ==
=== Vegetative reproduction ===
Nymphaea amazonum is stoloniferous, but does not produce proliferating pseudanthia.

=== Generative reproduction ===
The seed dispersal is hydrochorous (i.e. water-dispersed) or ornithochorous (i.e. bird-dispersed).

== Taxonomy ==
It was first described by Carl Friedrich Philipp von Martius and Joseph Gerhard Zuccarini in 1832.

=== Type specimen ===
The type specimen was collected in Brazil.

=== Placement within Nymphaea ===
It is placed in Nymphaea subg. Hydrocallis.

=== Former subspecies ===
Nymphaea amazonum was sepataed into the two subspecies Nymphaea amazonum subsp. amazonum and Nymphaea amazonum subsp. pedersenii Wiersema. This view was later rejected and Nymphaea amazonum subsp. pedersenii Wiersema was then treated as a separate species Nymphaea pedersenii (Wiersema) C.T.Lima & Giul. in 2021.

== Conservation ==
In Puerto Rico, USA Nymphaea amazonum faces habitat destruction. It is considered to be endangered (EN) in Cuba, as it faces diminishing and deteriorating habitats caused by agricultural practices, the influence of exotic flora and fauna, livestock farming, sedimentation, and pollution. In the Liste rouge de la flore vasculaire de Guadeloupe of 2019, Nymphaea amazonum is listed as data deficient (DD).

== Ecology ==
=== Habitat ===
In the Pantanal, it can be found in permanent ponds. It is also found in lagoons and canals. It is found growing in mixtures of clay and sand or in sandy-quartzitic soils. Rhizomes of Nymphaea amazonum can endure periods of drought in moist sediments. In the floodplains of the Amazon, it faces competition from aquatic and semi-aquatic grass species.

=== Pollination ===
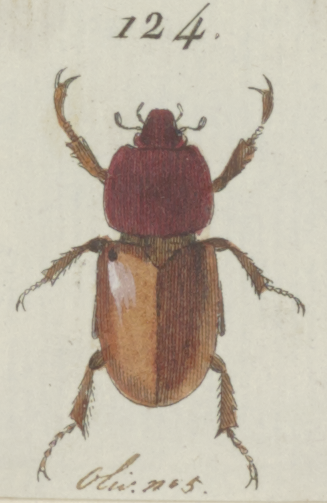
Cyclocephala castanea, a pollinator of Nymphaea amazonum

The strong floral fragrance attracts beetles of the genus Cyclocephala. The beetle species Cyclocephala castanea pollinates the flowers of Nymphaea amazonum.

== Uses ==
Nymphaea amazonum is used as a medicine and for food. The rhizomes are edible. It has the ability to absorb the pesticides cyhalothrin and imidacloprid from the water. It exhibits antimicrobial properties in the treatment of ulcers. The flowers have been used in the treatment of herpes and erysipelas.

== Cultivation ==
It is rare in cultivation.
