= Nymphaea pedersenii =

Scientific classification
- Kingdom: Plantae
- Clade: Tracheophytes
- Clade: Angiosperms
- Order: Nymphaeales
- Family: Nymphaeaceae
- Genus: Nymphaea
- Subgenus: Nymphaea subg. Hydrocallis
- Species: N. pedersenii

Binomial name
- Nymphaea pedersenii (Wiersema) C.T.Lima & Giul.

Synonyms
- Nymphaea amazonum subsp. pedersenii Wiersema

Species of water lily

Nymphaea pedersenii is a species of waterlily native to Argentina, Bolivia, Brazil, and Uruguay.

== Description ==
=== Vegetative characteristics ===
Nymphaea pedersenii has ovoid to subglobose tubers. The broadly elliptic leaf blade is up to 31 cm long and 22 cm wide. The coriaceous blade of the floating leaves is connected to non-brittle, brownish, glabrescent, 7.1−10 mm wide petioles with a ring of trichomes at the apex. It has two primary central air and six secondary peripheral air canals. The leaf venation is actinodromous.

=== Generative characteristics ===
The nocturnal flowers float on the water surface. The syncarpous gynoecium consists of approximately 39 carpels with clavate, cream-coloured, curved, 1.2−1.8 cm long and 2−4 mm wide appendages. The globose apex shows rosy colouration. The ellipsoid, granulose, pilose seeds have trichomes arranged in continuous longitudinal lines.

== Cytology ==
The diploid chromosome count is 2n = 18.

== Reproduction ==
=== Vegetative reproduction ===
In Argentina, the main mode of reproduction relies on stolon formation. Proliferating pseudanthia are absent.

=== Generative reproduction ===
This species is not autogamous and outcrossing is obligatory. Flowering occurs throughout the year.

== Taxonomy ==
It was first described by Wiersema in 1987 as Nymphaea amazonum subsp. pedersenii, but later it was elevated to a separate species Nymphaea pedersenii by C.T.Lima and Ana Maria Giulietti in 2021.

=== Type specimen ===
The type specimen was collected by Wiersema, Vanni and Schinini in a lagoon in Itatí, Corrientes, Argentina on the 15th of April 1982.

=== Placement within Nymphaea ===
It is placed in Nymphaea subg. Hydrocallis.

== Etymology ==
The specific epithet pedersenii honours Troels Myndel Pedersen.

== Ecology ==
=== Habitat ===
In Brazil, it was observed in a stream with up to 3 m depth in the state Pará and in permanent or temporary lagoons in the Pantanal. In Argentina, it was observed growing in a lagoon.

=== Pollination ===
It is pollinated by the beetle species Cyclocephala mollis. Beetles have been found trapped within the flowers.
