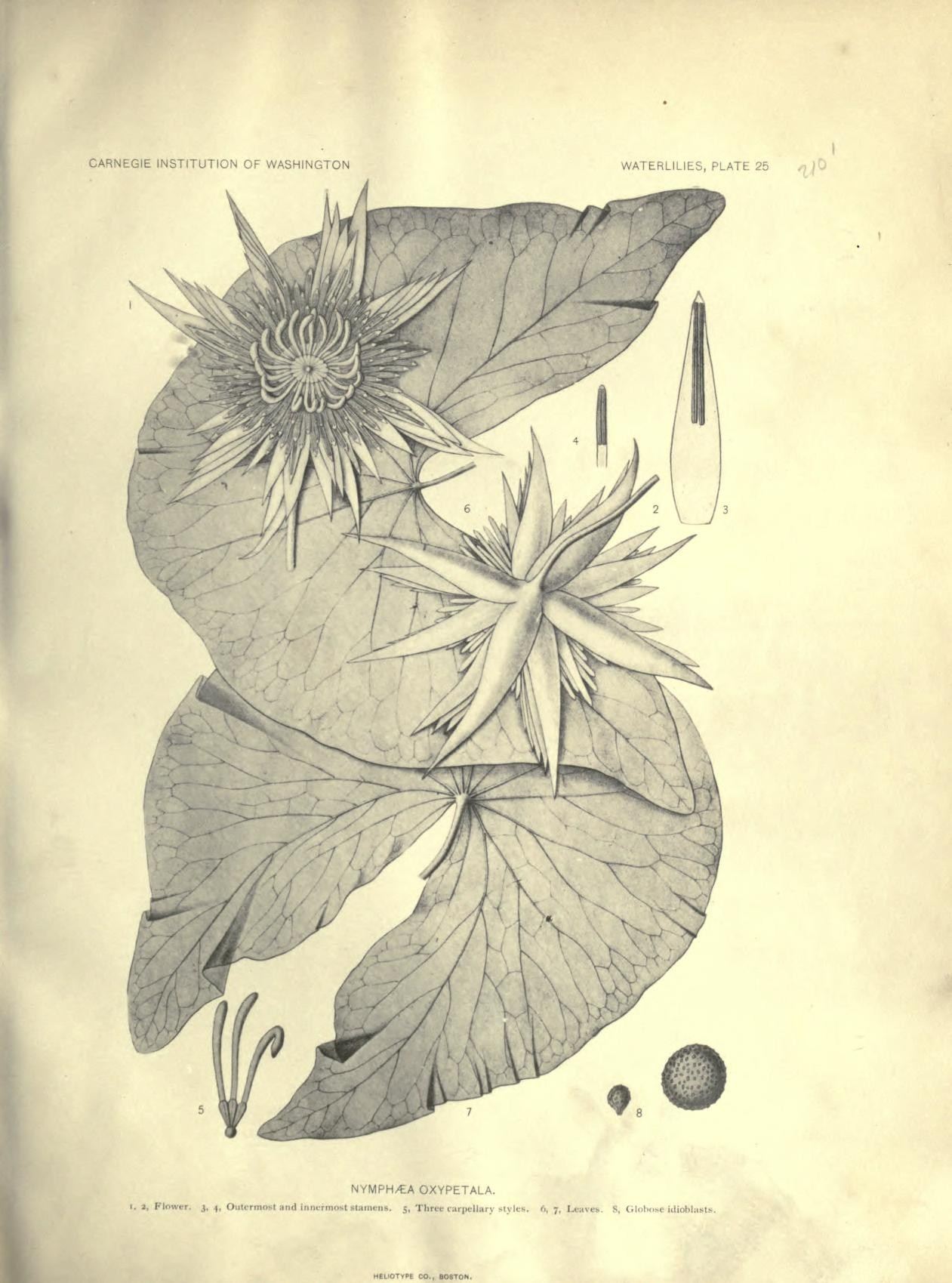
- Botanical illustration of Nymphaea oxypetala

Scientific classification
- Kingdom: Plantae
- Clade: Tracheophytes
- Clade: Angiosperms
- Order: Nymphaeales
- Family: Nymphaeaceae
- Genus: Nymphaea
- Subgenus: Nymphaea subg. Hydrocallis
- Species: N. oxypetala

Binomial name
- Nymphaea oxypetala Planch.

Synonyms
- Leuconymphaea oxypetala (Planch.) Kuntze; Nymphaea raja Lehm.

= Nymphaea oxypetala =

Species of water lily

Nymphaea oxypetala is a species of waterlily native to Bolivia, Brazil, Cuba, Ecuador, Paraguay, and Venezuela. It is a remarkable species with excessively acuminate and acute sepals and petals.

== Description ==
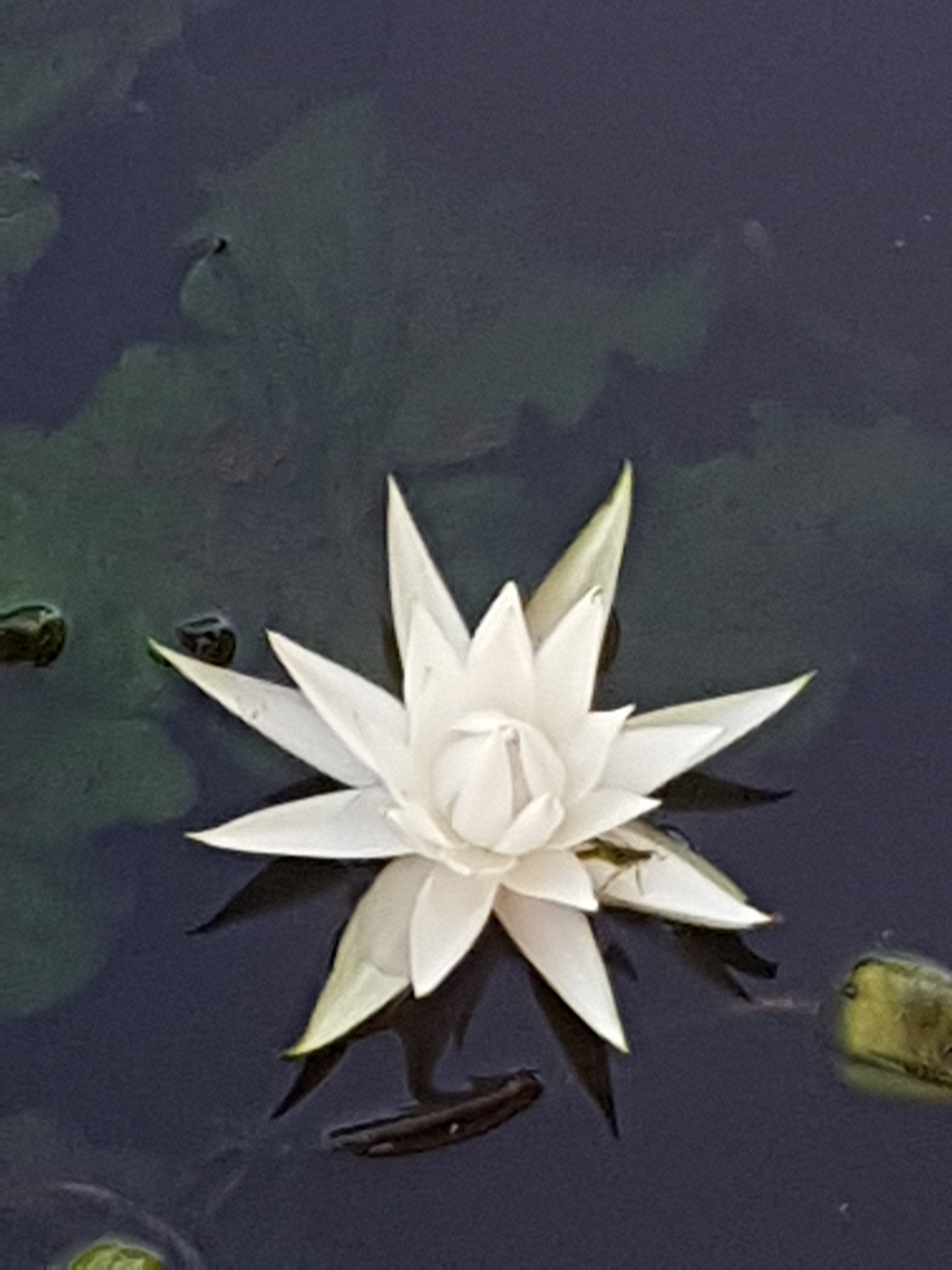
Flowering Nymphaea oxypetala in Rio Vira Sebo, Brazil

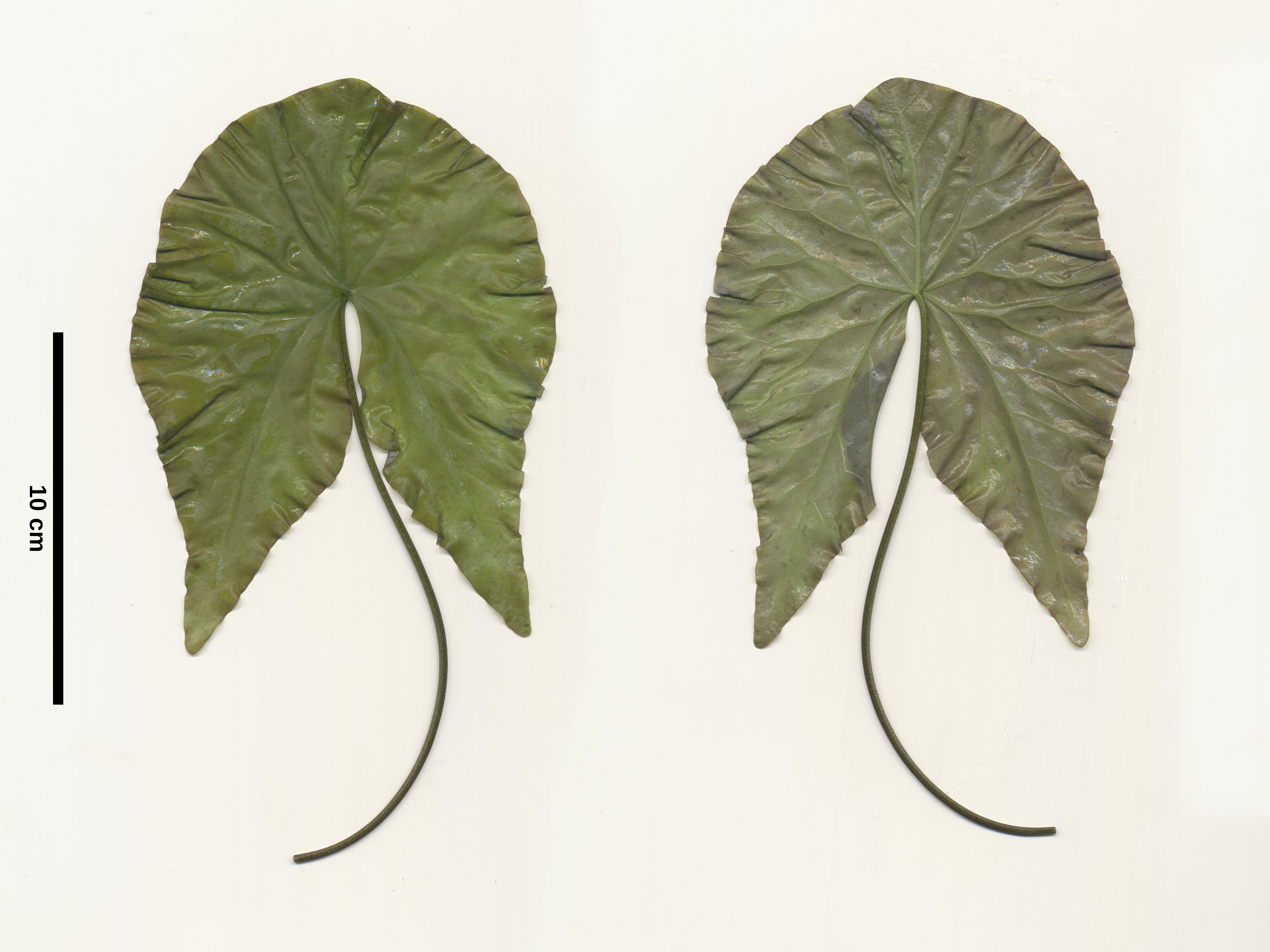
Submerged leaf of Nymphaea oxypetala with scale bar (10 cm)

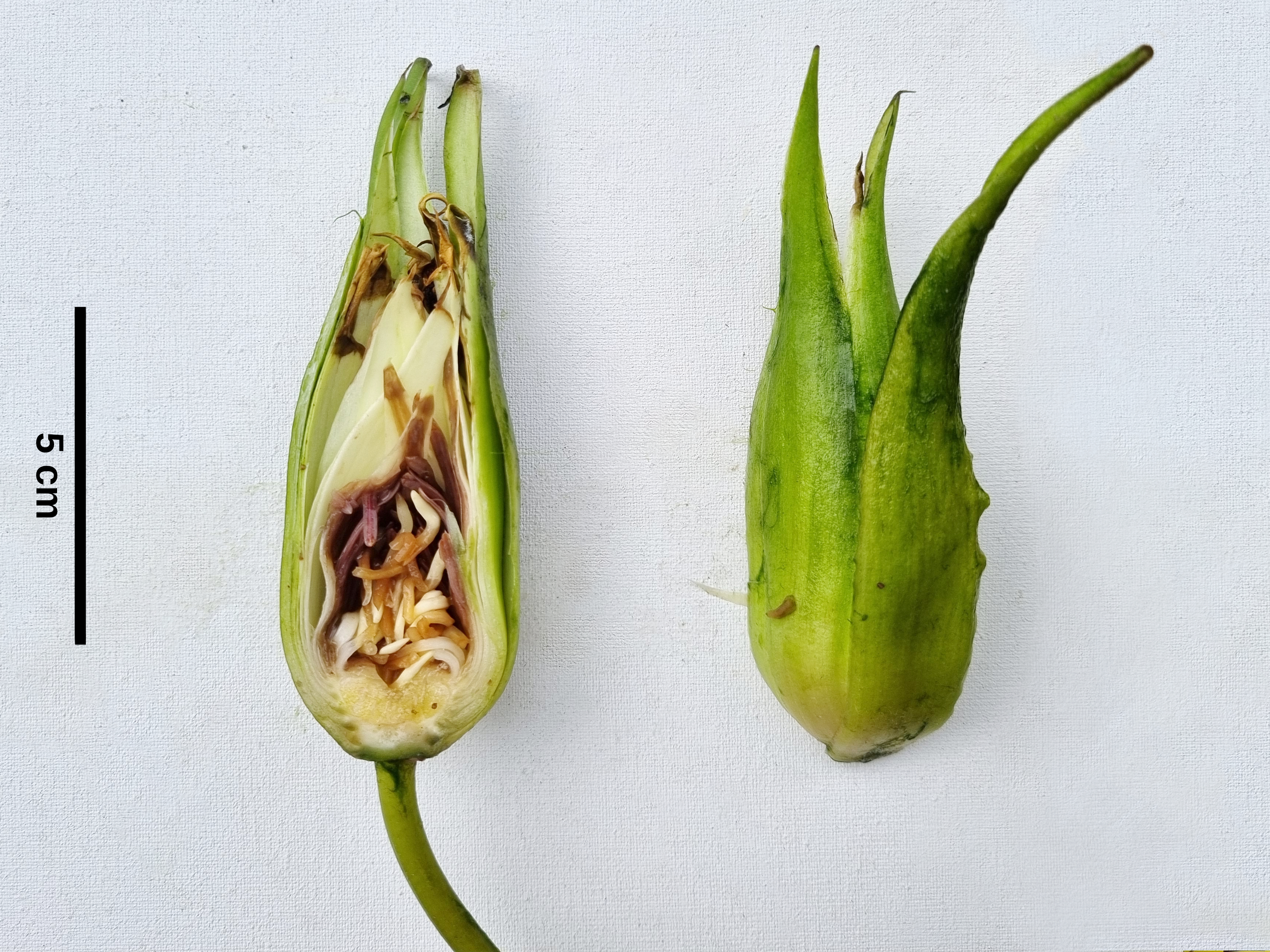
Flower of Nymphaea oxypetala with scale bar (5 cm)

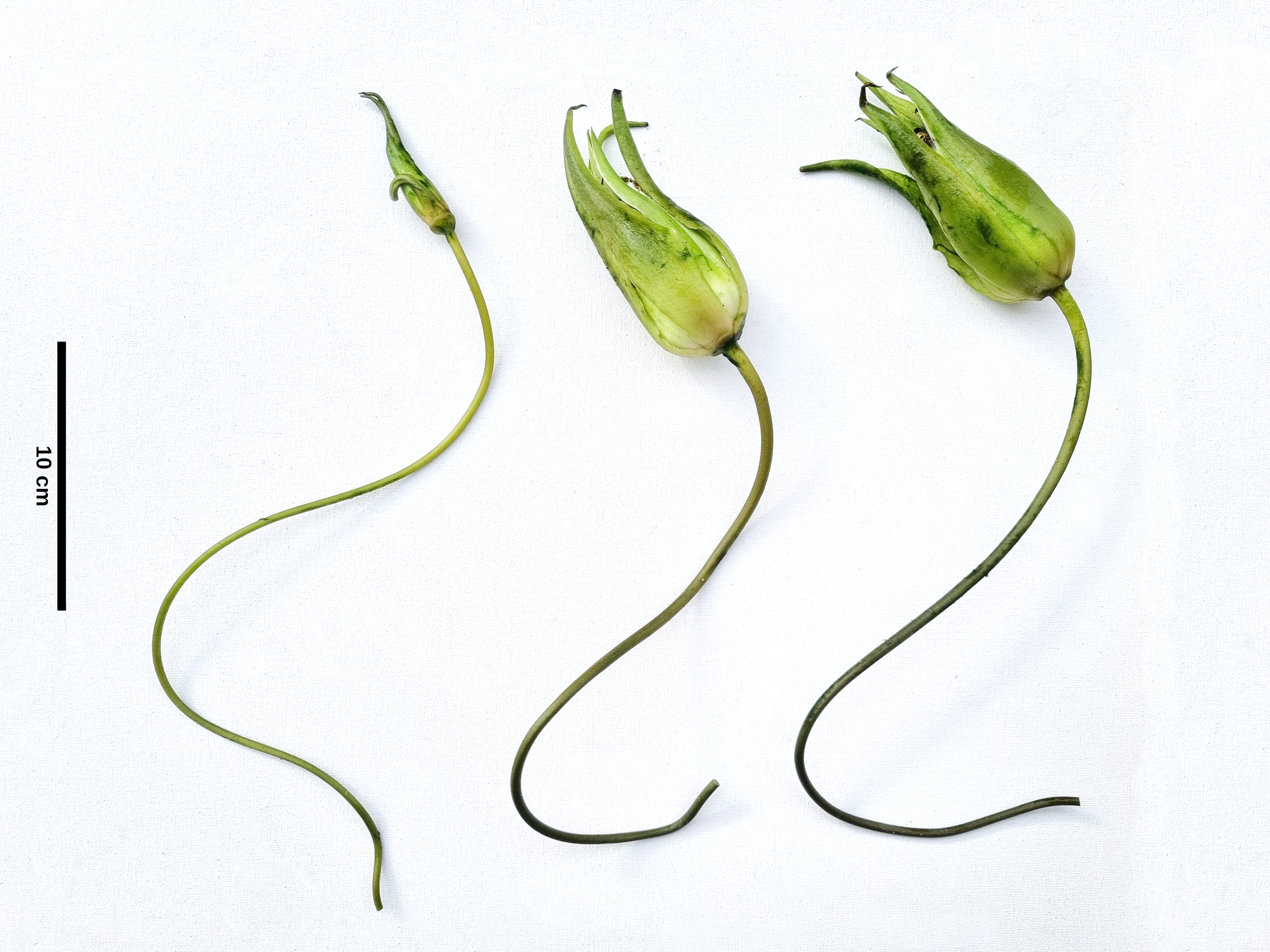
Flowers of Nymphaea oxypetala with scale bar (10 cm)

=== Vegetative characteristics ===
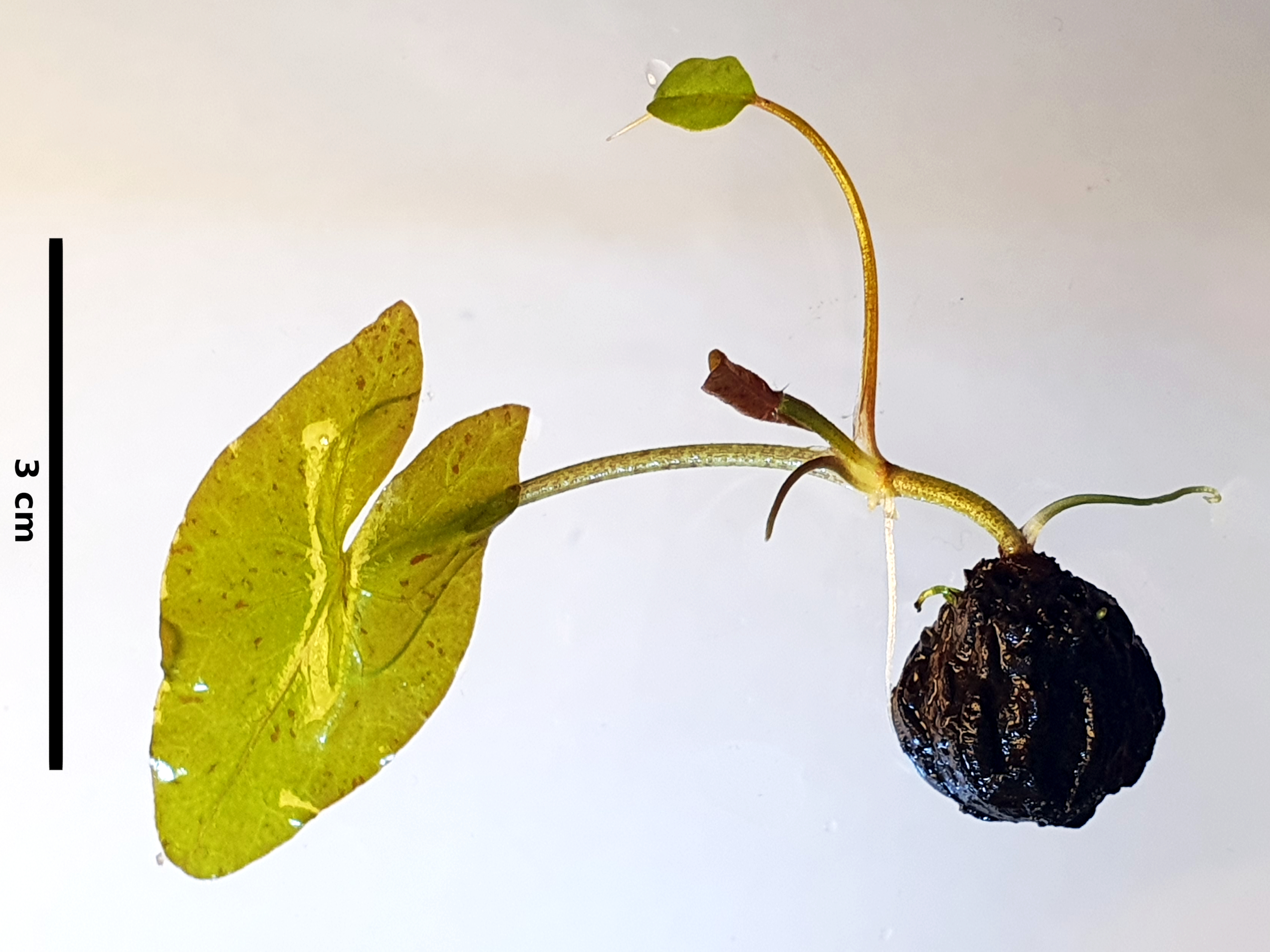
Sprouting Nymphaea oxypetala Planch. rhizome with scale bar (3 cm) against a white background

Unlike most other waterlilies, this species rarely produces floating leaves. The strongly reduced floating leaves are only produced very rarely. The smaller floating leaves are up to 6 cm large. The purplish-green, submerged, saggitate, membranous leaves are significantly larger with up to 30 cm big leaf blades. The broad submerged leaves display a likeness to the leaves of lettuce. The petioles are fragile and leaves break of easily.

=== Generative characteristics ===
The nocturnal flowers float on the water surface. The stamens are purple. The cream-coloured, 2 cm long carpellary appendages are abruptly folded at the apex. They are the longest carpellary appendages of all Nymphaea species. The floral fragrance has been described as ether-like.

== Cytology ==
The chromosome count of this polyploid species is 6n = 84.

== Reproduction ==
=== Vegetative reproduction ===
This species is likely not stoloniferous. Proliferating pseudanthia are also lacking in Nymphaea oxypetala.

=== Generative reproduction ===
Flowering occurs throughout March to August.

== Ecology ==
=== Habitat ===
It is associated with lotic habitats, These aquatic habitats are defined by the presence of moving water. It occurs in floodplains, river branches and in seasonal streams. In the Pantanal it occurs in the flooding area of the Paraguay River, Nabileque, Abobral and Poconé. In the Bolivian Pantanal, Nymphaea oxypetala was observed growing at depths of up to 2 m in gaps amid mats of floating vegetation and in localities where human activities prevented the growth of such floating mats along the margins.

== Taxonomy ==
=== Type specimen ===
The type specimen was collected by W. Jameson in March 1845 in Ecuador near Guayaquil.

=== Placement within Nymphaea ===
It is placed within Nymphaea subg. Hydrocallis.

== Etymology ==
The specific epithet oxypetala refers to the pointed petals of this species.

== Conservation ==
The conservation status in Brazil is not evaluated (NE).

== Cultivation ==
It is kept as an aquarium plant, as well as in small containers of water. It is intolerant of cold, turbid and saline water and favours clear, slowly flowing freshwater.
