= Nymphaea tenuinervia =

Scientific classification
- Kingdom: Plantae
- Clade: Tracheophytes
- Clade: Angiosperms
- Order: Nymphaeales
- Family: Nymphaeaceae
- Genus: Nymphaea
- Subgenus: Nymphaea subg. Hydrocallis
- Species: N. tenuinervia

Binomial name
- Nymphaea tenuinervia Casp.

Synonyms
- Nymphaea pulchella Lehm. ex Casp.

Species of water lily

Nymphaea tenuinervia is a species of waterlily native to Colombia, Guyana and Brazil.

== Description ==
=== Vegetative characteristics ===
Nymphaea tenuinervia is an aquatic herb. The ovoid rhizome is stoloniferous throughout the vegetative period. The heart-shaped to egg-shaped leaves have a firm texture and entire margins. The leaf blade is 21 cm long and 19 cm wide. The abaxial leaf surface features elongated round, small, black spots directed along their longitudinal axis toward the centre of the leaf blade. The petiole bears downward-facing trichomes towards its upper end. The leaf bears characteristic bifurcated (Y-shaped) trichosclereids in the mesophyll layer of the leaf.

=== Generative characteristics ===
Anisole is the primary component of the floral fragrance of Nymphaea tenuinervia

Nymphaea tenuinervia has protogynous flowers with nocturnal anthesis. The floral fragrance has been described as solvent-like. It is primarily composed of anisole, but also significantly smaller amounts of (methoxymethyl)benzene and butyl acetate. The ovoid, granulose, pilose seeds feature trichomes arranged in continuous longitudinal lines.

== Cytology ==
The diploid chromosome count is 2n = 20. It has 8 large and 12 smaller chromosomes.

== Reproduction ==
=== Vegetative reproduction ===
In most populations vegetative reproduction through stolons plays a significant role in reproduction. Proliferating pseudanthia are absent.

=== Generative reproduction ===
Autogamy was not observed in this species, therefore a reliance on out-crossing for generative reproduction is likely.

== Habitat ==
In Brasil, it occurs in the Amazon rainforest, the central Brazilian savanna, and the Atlantic rainforest as aquatic vegetation.

== Taxonomy ==
=== Type specimen ===
The type specimen was collected near Juazeiro in the St. Francisco river of Bahia, Brazil in April 1819.

=== Placement within Nymphaea ===
It is a member of Nymphaea subg. Hydrocallis.

=== Orthographic variants ===
In the original description it was first named Nymphaea tenuinervia. However, in other parts of the publication it is spelled as Nymphaea tenerinervia. Nymphaea tenerinervia Casp. is an orthographical variant of Nymphaea tenuinervia Casp.

== Etymology ==
The specific epithet tenuinervia is composed of two parts. The first part tenui- means thin or slender, and -nervia means veins or nerves. Together it means fine-nerved.

== Ecology ==
=== Pollination ===
Scarabeid beetles are thought to be pollinators of Nymphaea tenuinervia.
