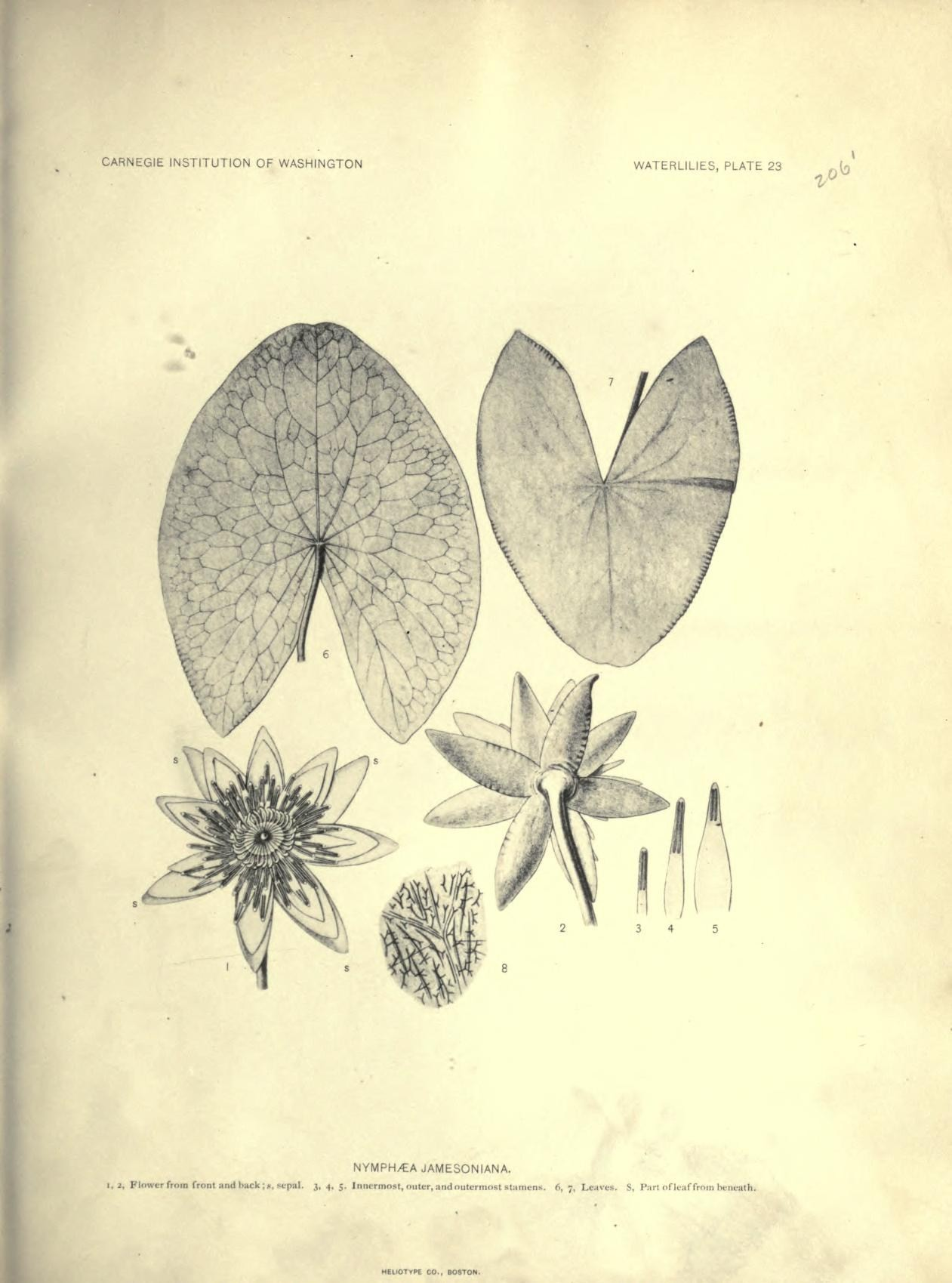
- Botanical illustration of Nymphaea jamesoniana

Conservation status
- Secure (NatureServe)

Scientific classification
- Kingdom: Plantae
- Clade: Tracheophytes
- Clade: Angiosperms
- Order: Nymphaeales
- Family: Nymphaeaceae
- Genus: Nymphaea
- Subgenus: Nymphaea subg. Hydrocallis
- Species: N. jamesoniana

Binomial name
- Nymphaea jamesoniana Planch.

Synonyms
- Castalia jamesoniana (Planch.) Britton & P.Wilson; Leuconymphaea jamesoniana (Planch.) Kuntze; Castalia gibertii Morong; Leuconymphaea gibertii Morong ex Conard; Nymphaea gibertii (Morong) Conard; Nymphaea sagittariifolia Lehm.

= Nymphaea jamesoniana =

Species of water lily

Nymphaea jamesoniana is a species of waterlily native to the USA (Western Florida), Mexico, and tropical South America.

== Description ==
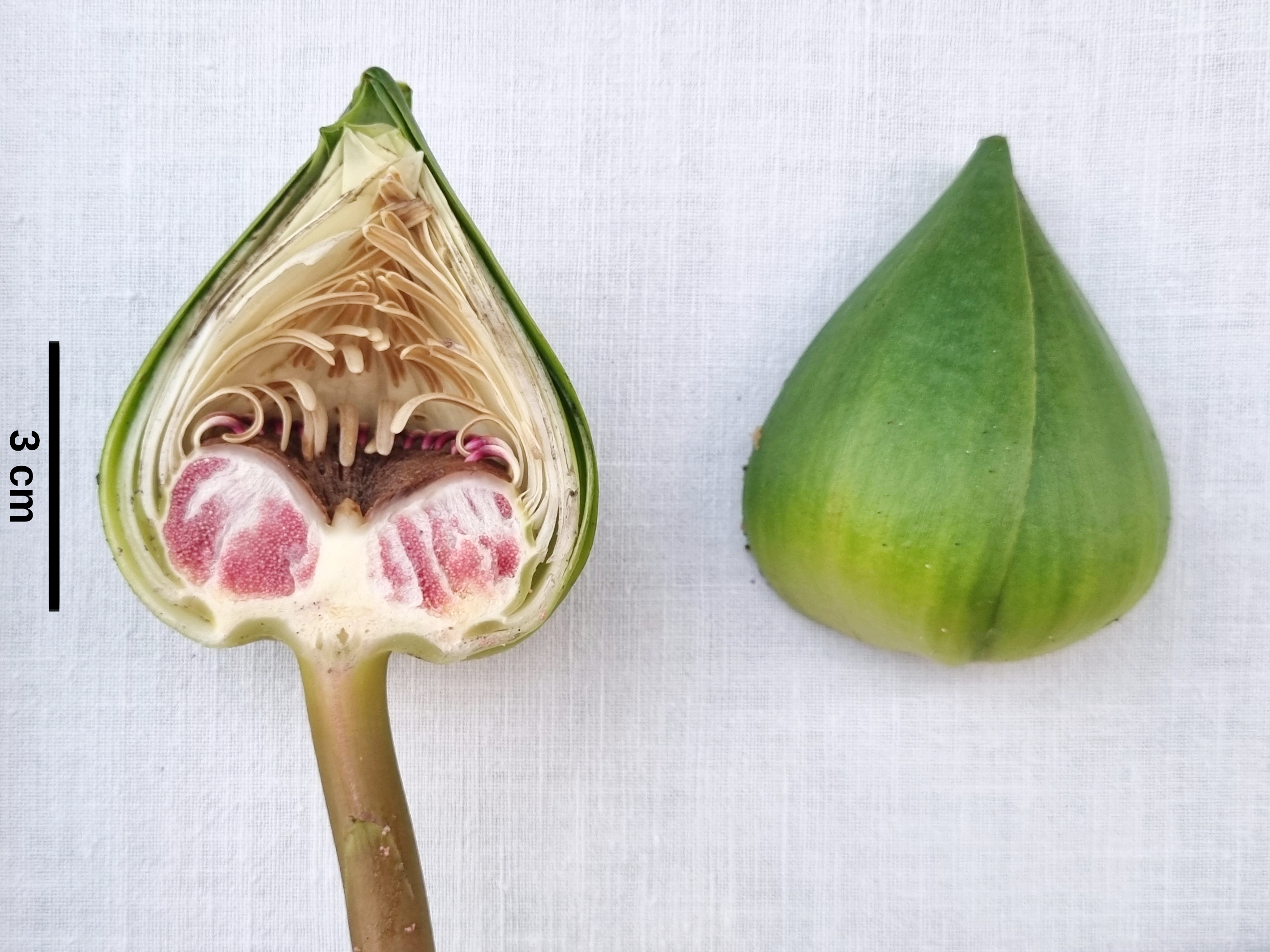
Halved Nymphaea jamesoniana Planch. fruit with immature seeds and scale bar (3 cm)

=== Vegetative characteristics ===
Nymphaea jamesoniana is a long-lived, perennial aquatic herb. The abaxial leaf surface is marked with short, dark purple, sometimes bifurcating lines.

=== Generative characteristics ===
The granulose, pilose, ellipsoid seeds feature trichomes in longitudinal, interrupted lines.

== Cytology ==
The diploid chromosome count is 2n = 28. The chloroplast genome is 158830 bp long.

== Reproduction ==
=== Vegetative reproduction ===
Stolons and proliferating pseudanthia are absent.

=== Generative reproduction ===
Water disperses the seeds (i.e. hydrochory).

== Habitat ==
It grows in various freshwater habitats, such as marshes, canals, shallow waters, flooded ditches, flooded flatwoods, ponds, slowly flowing streams, and lakes. It is intolerant of saltwater.

== Taxonomy ==
Nymphaea jamesoniana was first published by Jules Émile Planchon in 1852.

=== Type specimen ===
The type specimen was collected in Ecuador by Jameson.

=== Placement within Nymphaea ===
It is placed in Nymphaea subg. Hydrocallis.

== Etymology ==
The specific epithet jamesoniana honours the Scottish botanist William Jameson (1796-1873).

== Conservation ==
In Puerto Rico, USA it faces habitat destruction. The NatureServe conservation status is secure (G5). In Florida, USA it is considered to be endangered.

== Uses ==
Nymphaea jamesoniana has been employed in the treatment of conditions such as irritated eyes, dysentery, and skin lesions. It has been utilized for its astringent properties. There are claims that its flowers possess narcotic properties. The Chorote people of Argentina use the rhizomes as food. Apart from the Chorote people, the rhizomes are also used by Wichi, Western Toba, and Pilagá.

== Cultivation ==
It is suitable for cultivation in the USDA zones 9a - 10a.
