= Nymphaea lingulata =

Scientific classification
- Kingdom: Plantae
- Clade: Tracheophytes
- Clade: Angiosperms
- Order: Nymphaeales
- Family: Nymphaeaceae
- Genus: Nymphaea
- Subgenus: Nymphaea subg. Hydrocallis
- Species: N. lingulata

Binomial name
- Nymphaea lingulata Wiersema

Species of water lily

Nymphaea lingulata is a species of waterlily native to Bolivia, Brazil, and Paraguay.

== Description ==
=== Vegetative characteristics ===
Nymphaea lingulata is an aquatic herb with ovoid to subglobose rhizomes. The ovate, suborbicular to orbicular floating leaves have flat, entire margins. The glabrous petiole has 2-4 primary central and 4-10 secondary peripheral air canals.

=== Generative characteristics ===
The glabrous, reddish peduncle has 5-6 primary central and 10−12 secondary peripheral air canals. The ovoid, ruminate, pilose seeds have trichomes arranged in continuous longitudinal lines.

It is only slightly fragrant. The floral fragrance has been described as solvent-like. It consists of the compounds Benzyl alcohol, and (methoxymethyl)benzene.

== Cytology ==
The diploid chromosome count is 2n = 18.

== Reproduction ==
=== Vegetative reproduction ===
It is stoloniferous, but does not produce proliferating pseudanthia. Vegetative reproduction does occur, but according to Wiersema, sexual reproduction likely is of greater significance in this species. However, more recent field observations indicate a greater significance of vegetative reproduction, which diminishes the importance of sexual reproduction.

=== Generative reproduction ===
Abundant seed production through autogamy has been reported. According to Wiersema, the main mode of reproduction in Nymphaea lingulata likely relies on autogamous sexual reproduction. Field observations contradict these findings, stating that the main mode of reproduction relies on stolon formation.

== Taxonomy ==
It was first described by Wiersema in 1984.

=== Type specimen ===
The type specimen of was collected by Wiersema, Horn, and de Ataide Silva in Maranhão, Brazil, from a pond between Teresina and Caxias on the 28th of June 1982.

=== Placement within Nymphaea ===
It is placed in Nymphaea subg. Hydrocallis.

== Etymology ==
The specific epithet lingulata means tongue-shaped.

== Conservation ==
It appears to be a rare species.

== Ecology ==
=== Habitat ===
Nymphaea lingulata grows in temporary lagoons, and in slowly flowing rivers. It occurs sympatrically with Nymphaea pulchella, and Cabomba.

=== Pollination ===
Scarab beetles likely act as pollinators of Nymphaea lingulata.
