= State University of Feira de Santana =

Public university in Bahia, Brazil

- Universidade Estadual de Feira de Santana
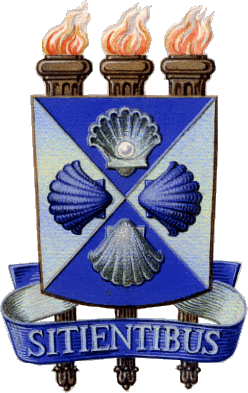
- Other names: UEFS
- Motto: Sitientibus (Latin)
- Type: Public University
- Established: 31 May 1976
- Chancellor: Amali de Angelis Mussi
- Location: Feira de Santana, Bahia, Brazil; 12°11′51″S 38°58′00″W
- Website: www.uefs.br

The State University of Feira de Santana (Portuguese: Universidade Estadual de Feira de Santana, UEFS) is a public institution of higher education in Brazil, based in the city of Feira de Santana, Bahia. Until the 1990s, it was also the only university in this city.

Currently, the university has 27 graduate courses, offering 765 places by year for the third degree, with an average of 17.85 candidates per seat.

== See also ==
- List of state universities in Brazil
