= Ana Maria Giulietti =

Argentinian botanist

Ana Maria Giulietti Harley
- Born: 1945 (age 80–81)
- Education: Universidade Federal Rural de Pernambuco Universidade de São Paulo

Ana Maria Giulietti Harley (born 1945) is a Brazilian biochemist, botanist, and educator known for researching Eriocaulaceae, as well as her work at the University of São Paulo, State University of Feira de Santana, and Vale Institute of Technology. She has described over 70 species and gathered over 300 specimens. She was the 2013 recipient of the José Cuatrecasas Medal for Excellence in Tropical Botany. The standard author abbreviation Giul. is used to indicate this person as the author when citing a botanical name.

== Early life and education ==
Born in Pesqueira, Brazil, Giulietti went on to receive her Bachelor's at Universidade Federal Rural de Pernambuco, Recife in 1967. She then studied for a Master's at the Universidade de São Paulo, which she received in 1970. She stayed at the university to undertake doctoral studies, where she investigated the genera Eriocaulon and Leiothrix. She received her PhD in 1978.

== Awards ==
In 2013, she was awarded the Jose Cuatrecasas Medal for Excellence in Tropical Botany.
