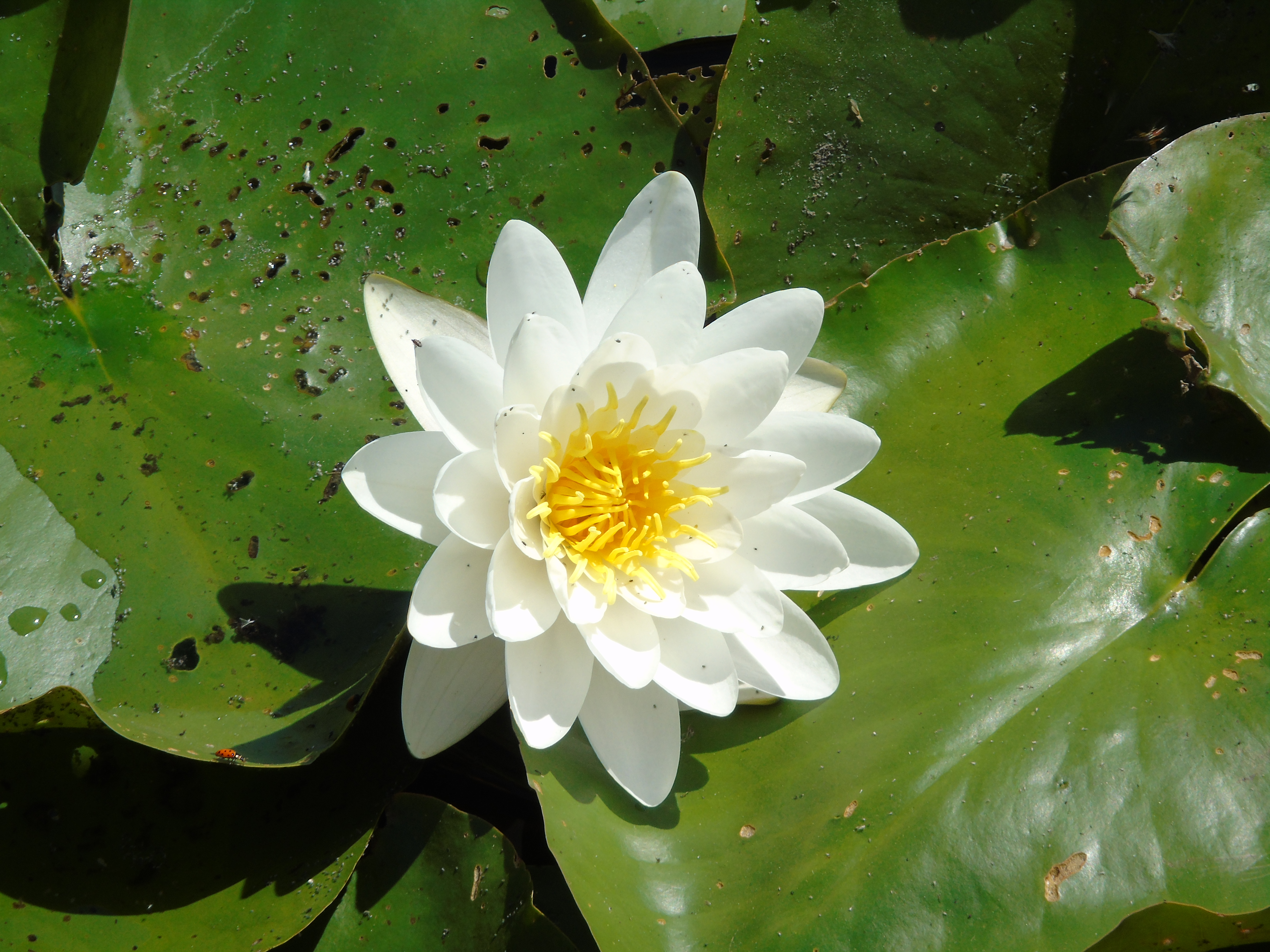
- Nymphaea alba L., the type species of the genus

Scientific classification
- Kingdom: Plantae
- Clade: Tracheophytes
- Clade: Angiosperms
- Order: Nymphaeales
- Family: Nymphaeaceae
- Genus: Nymphaea; L.

Type species
- Nymphaea alba L.

Species
- 65 species, see here

Synonyms
- Castalia Salisb.; Leuconymphaea Kuntze; Ondinea Hartog

= Nymphaea =

Genus of aquatic plants

Nymphaea (/nɪmˈfiːə/) is a genus of hardy and tender aquatic plants in the family Nymphaeaceae. The genus has a cosmopolitan distribution. Many species are cultivated as ornamental plants, and many cultivars have been bred. Some taxa occur as introduced species where they are not native, and some are weeds. Plants of the genus are known commonly as water lilies, or waterlilies in the United Kingdom.

== Description ==
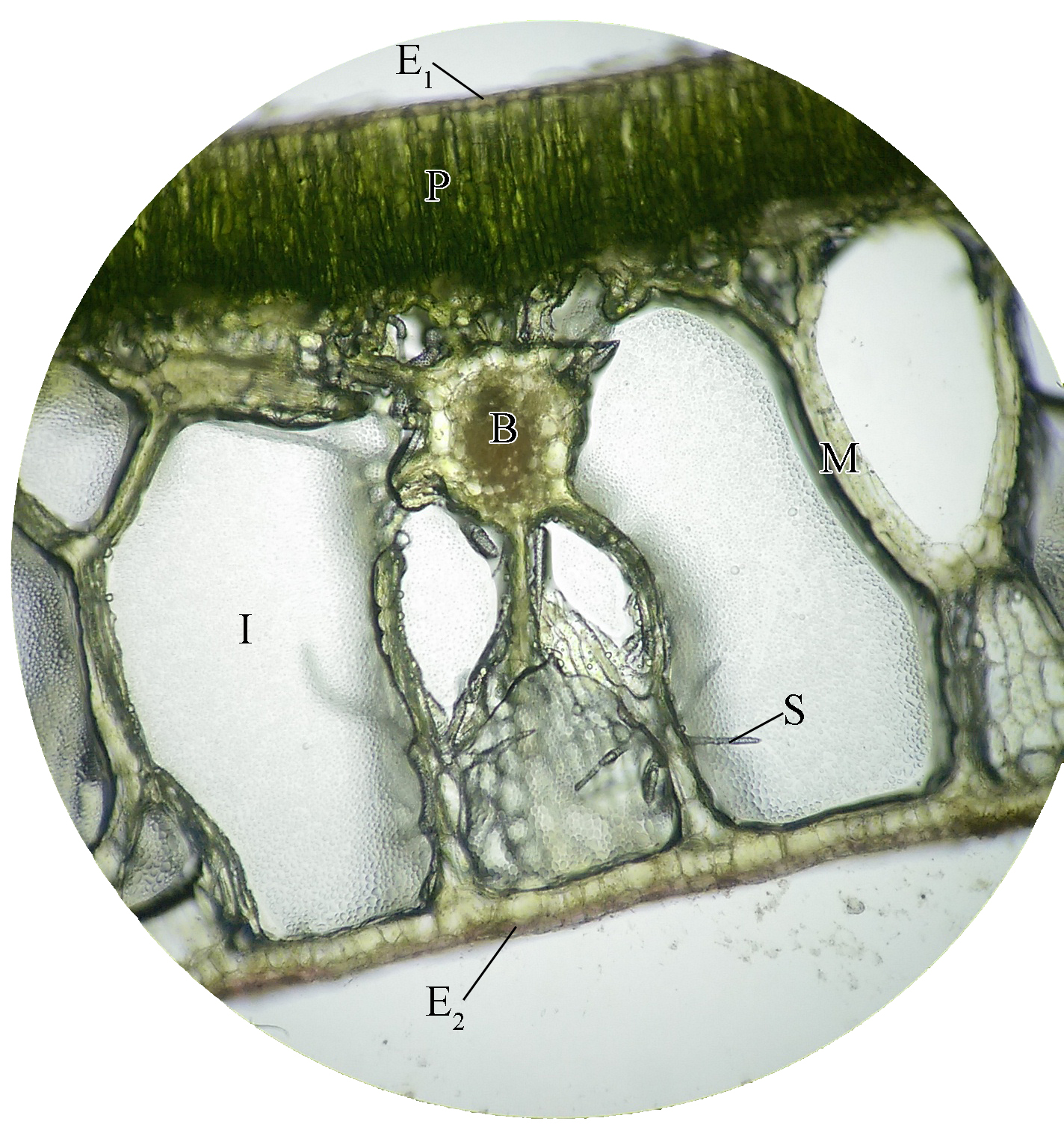
A bright-field micrograph of a cross-section of a floating leaf of Nymphaea alba.: E1: upper epiderm; E2: lower epiderm; P: palisade mesophyll; M: spongy mesophyll; B: vascular bundle; I: intercellular gap; S: sclerenchyma

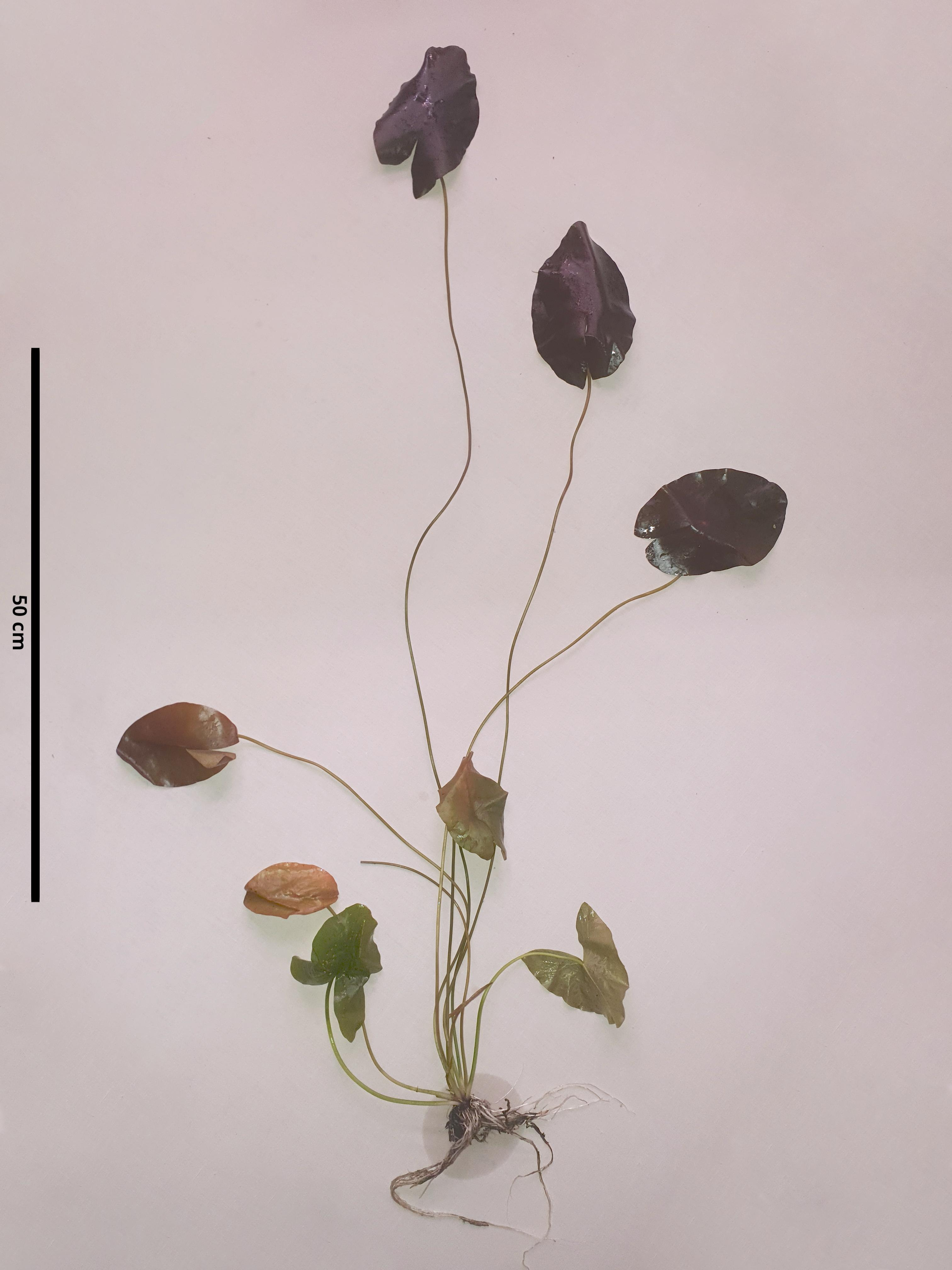
Complete specimen of Nymphaea cf. gardneriana Planch. with several floating leaves, as well as submerged leaves with scale bar (50 cm) on a white background

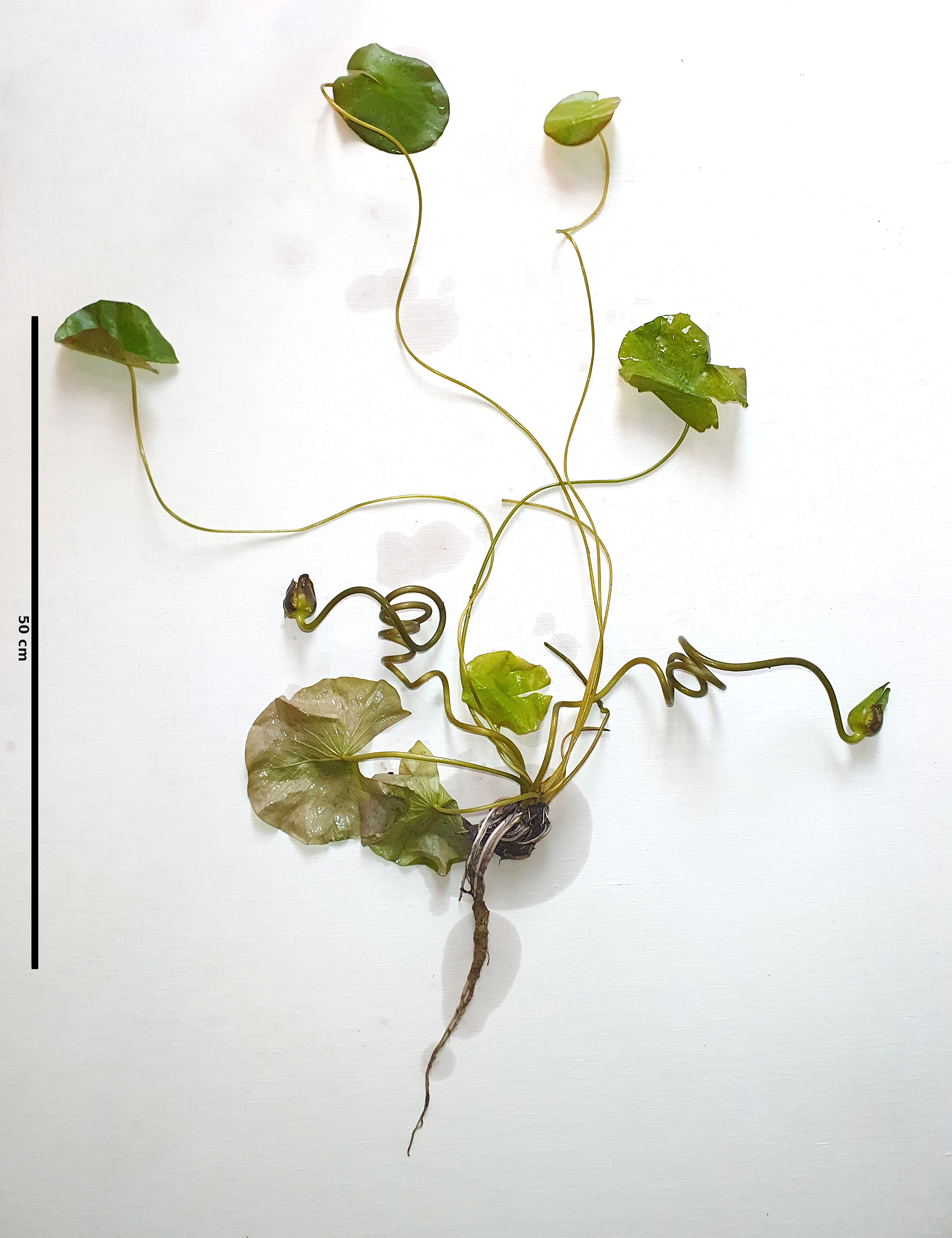
Complete specimen of Nymphaea nouchali var. caerulea (Savigny) Verdc. with scale bar (50 cm) on a white background

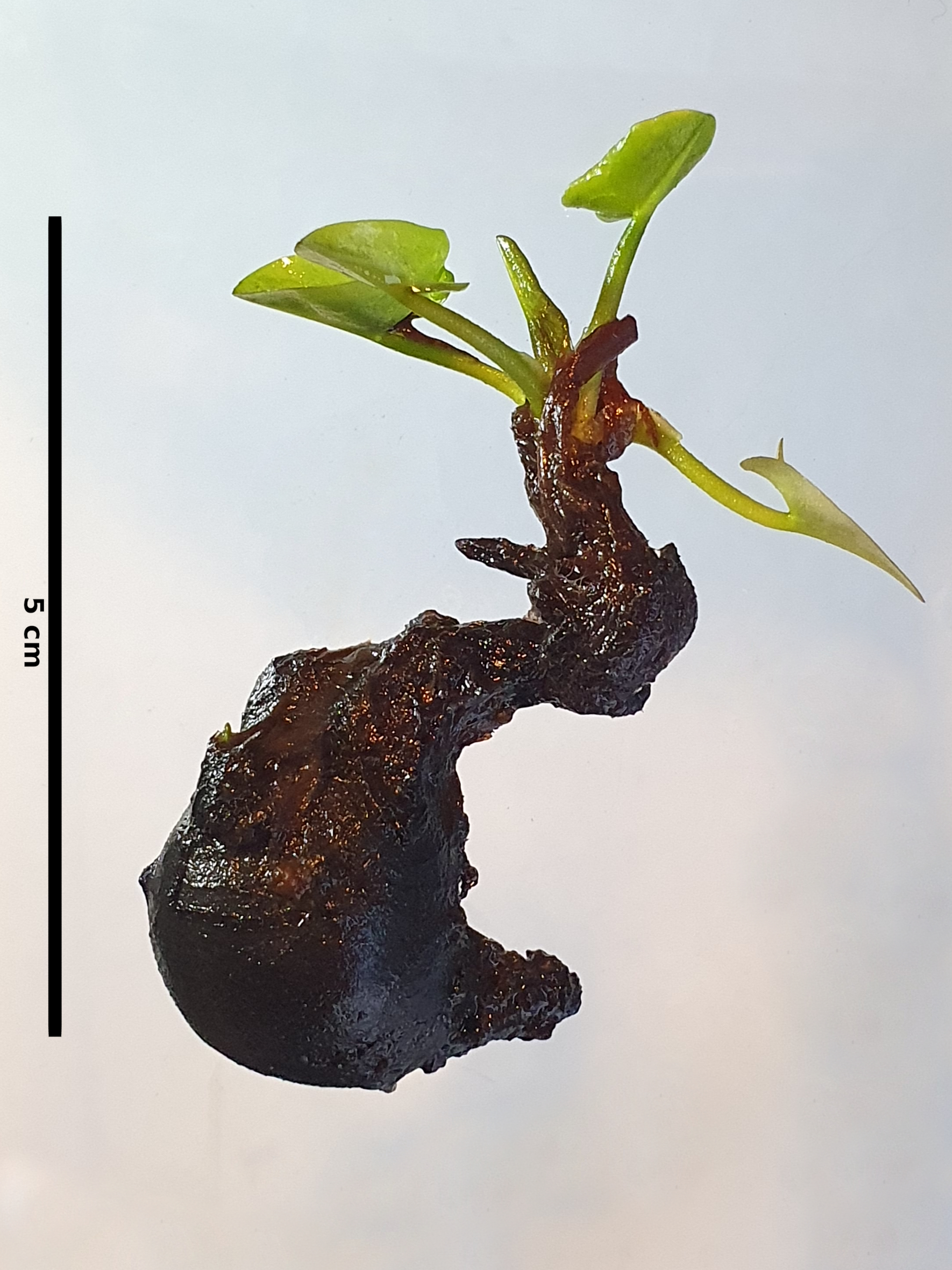
Rhizome of Nymphaea gigantea "Albert De Lestang" with scale bar (5 cm) against a grey background

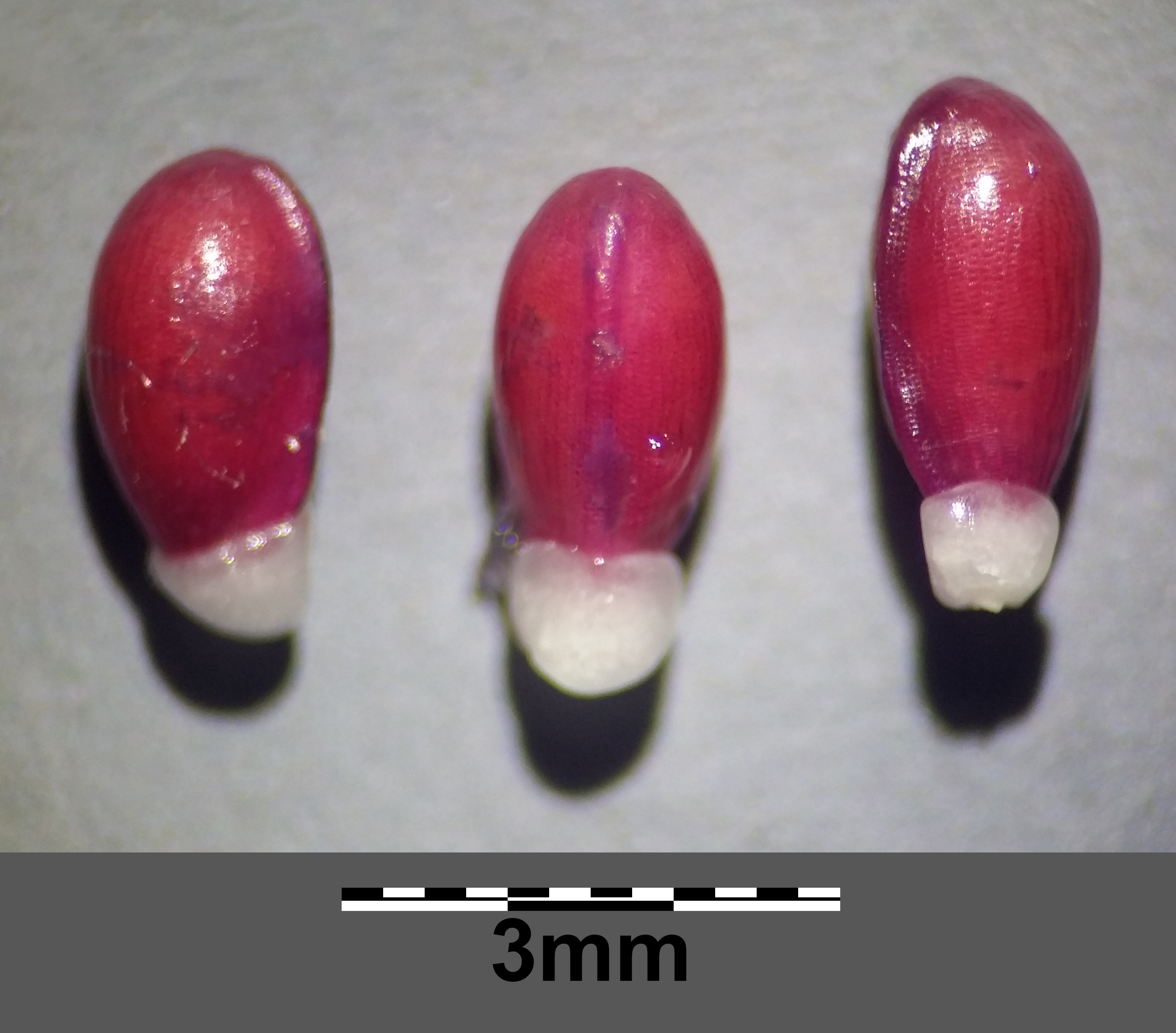
Seeds of Nymphaea alba with scale bar (3 mm) against a grey background

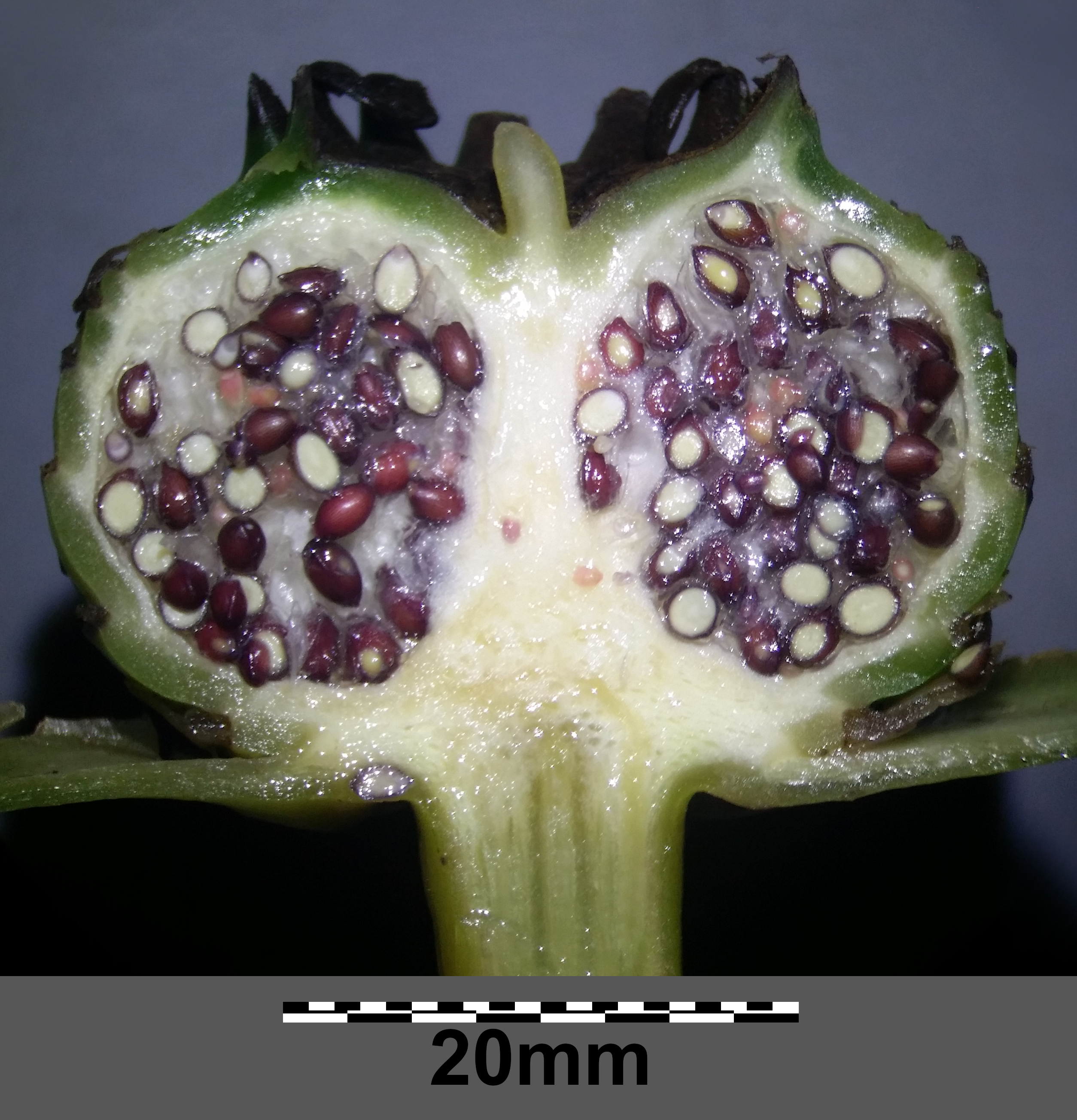
Halved Nymphaea alba fruit with scale bar (20 mm) against a dark background

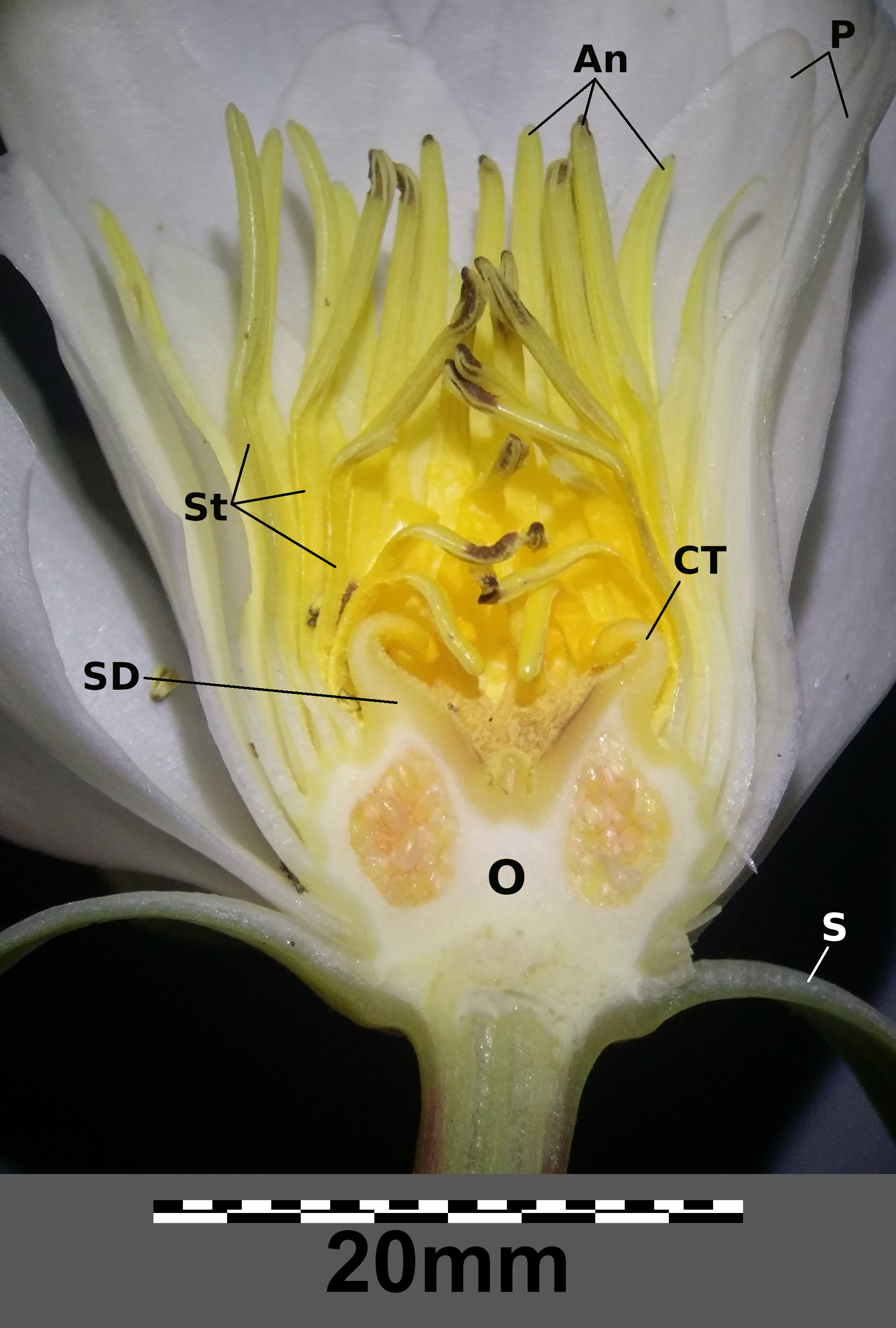
Longitudinal section of Nymphaea alba flower with scale bar (20 mm) against a dark background S = sepals, P = petals, St = stamina, An = anthers, O = ovary, SD = stigma disc, CT = carpellary teeth

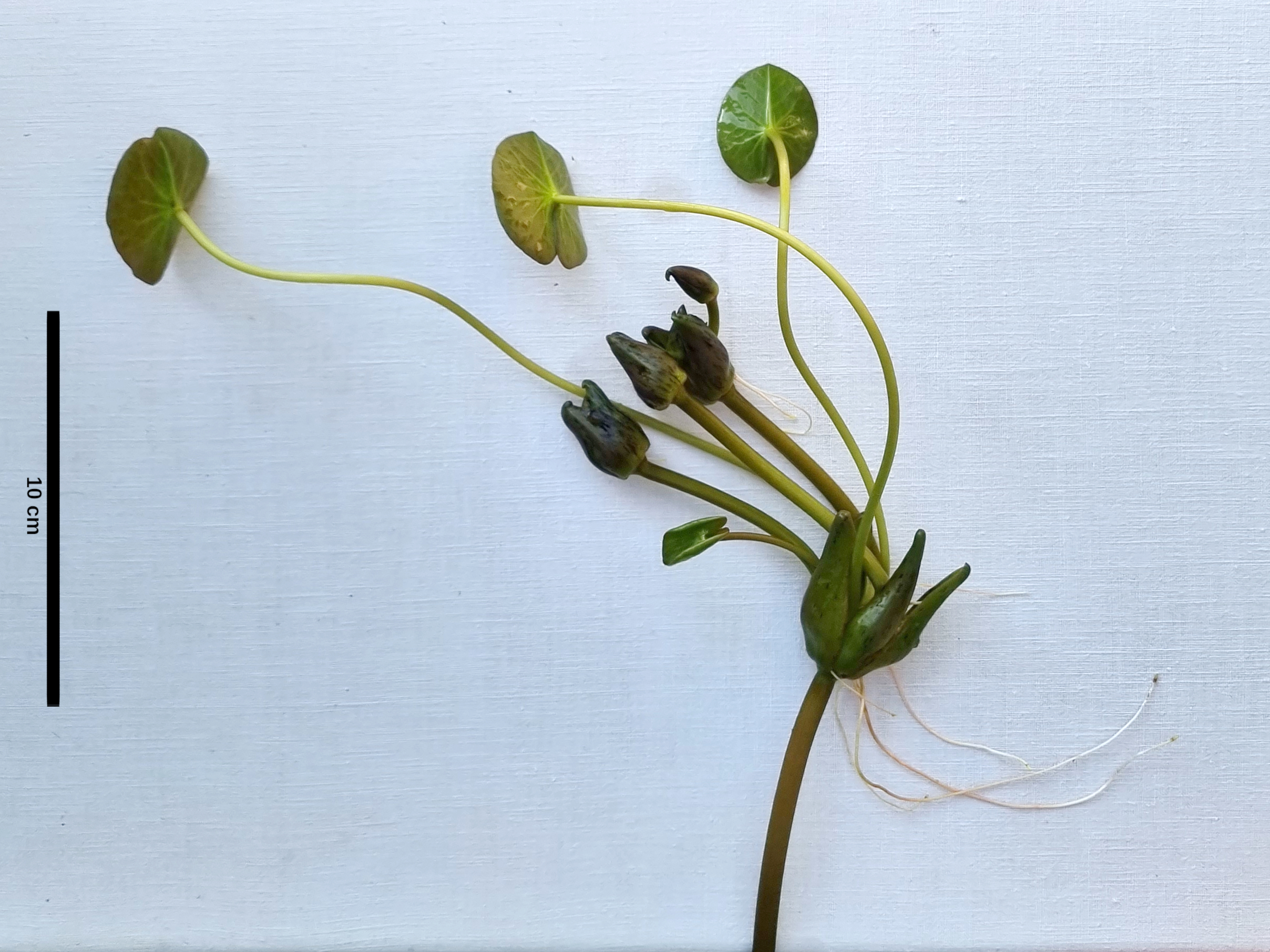
Proliferating pseudanthium or tubiferous flower of Nymphaea prolifera Wiersema

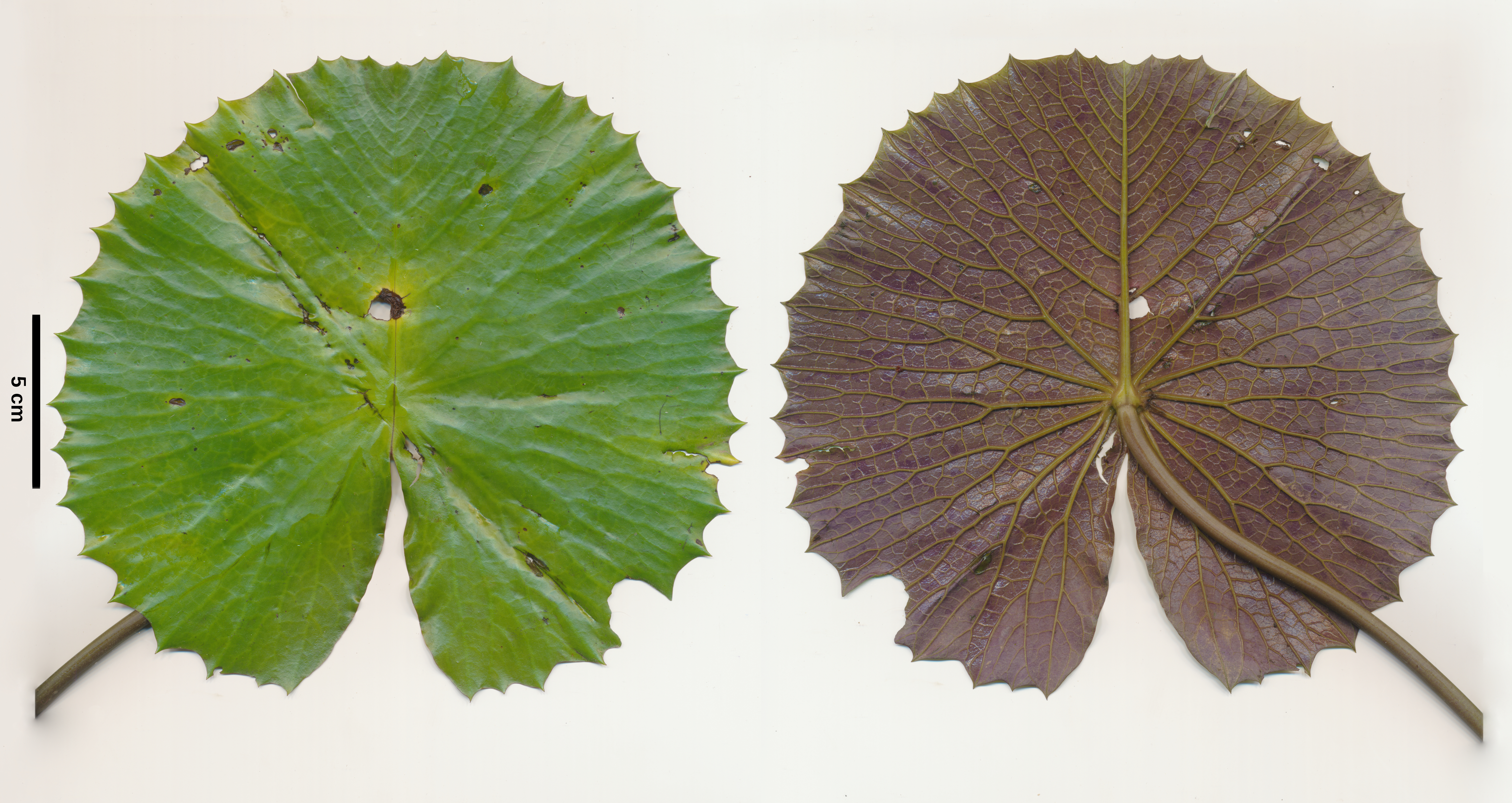
Nymphaea lotus leaf with scale bar (5 cm) Upper surface (left) and lower surface (right)

=== Vegetative characteristics ===
Water lilies are aquatic, rhizomatous or tuberous, perennial or annual herbs with sometimes desiccation-tolerant, branched or unbranched rhizomes, which can be stoloniferous, or lacking stolons. The tuberous or fibrous roots are contractile. The leaves are mostly floating, but submerged and emergent leaves occur as well. The shape of the lamina can be ovate, orbicular, elliptic, hastate, or sagittate. The width of the lamina ranges in size from 2.5–3 cm to 40–60 cm. The lamina has a deep sinus and the basal lobes can be overlapping or divergent. The margin of the lamina can be entire, dentate, or sinuate. The leaves can be stipulate, or exstipulate. The petioles are a few centimetres to 5–6 m long, and 0.3–1.9 cm wide.

=== Generative characteristics ===
The flowers are emergent, floating, or rarely submerged. The diurnal or nocturnal, chasmogamous or rarely cleistogamous, solitary, hermaphrodite, entomophilous, fragrant or inodorous flowers are mostly protogynous. The flowers have (3–)4(–5) green, sometimes spotted sepals, and about 6–50 lanceolate to spathulate, differently coloured petals, which are often gradually transitioning into the shape of the stamens. The gap between petals and stamens can be present or absent. The androecium consists of 20–750 stamens. The stamens can be petaloid or not petal-like. The gynoecium consists of 5–35 carpels. The carpels usually possess a sterile appendage. The globose, fleshy, spongy, irregularly dehiscent fruit, borne on a terete, glabrous or pubescent, curved or coiled peduncle, bears arillate, globose to elliptic, hairy or glabrous seeds with a smooth surface or longitudinal ridges. Proliferating pseudanthia or tuberous flowers (i.e., sterile, branching, proliferating floral structures for vegetative propagation) can be present or absent.

=== Cytology ===
Various ploidy levels have been observed in Nymphaea: 2x, 3x, 4x, 6x, 8x, and 16x. The chromosome count ranges from 28 to 224.

== Taxonomy ==
The genus Nymphaea L. was described by Carl Linnaeus in 1753. It has three synonyms: Castalia Salisb. published by Richard Anthony Salisbury in 1805, Leuconymphaea Kuntze published by Otto Kuntze in 1891, and Ondinea Hartog published by Cornelis den Hartog in 1970. The type species is Nymphaea alba L.

=== Subgenera ===
The genus Nymphaea has been divided into several subgenera:

- Nymphaea subg. Anecphya (Casp.) Conard
- Nymphaea subg. Brachyceras (Casp.) Conard
- Nymphaea subg. Confluentes S.W.L.Jacobs
- Nymphaea subg. Hydrocallis (Planch.) Conard
- Nymphaea subg. Lotos (DC.) Conard
- Nymphaea subg. Nymphaea (autonym)

=== Sections ===
The subgenus Nymphaea subg. Nymphaea has been divided into sections:

- Nymphaea sect. Chamaenymphaea (Planch.) Wiersema
- Nymphaea sect. Nymphaea (autonym)
- Nymphaea sect. Xanthantha (Casp.) Wiersema

=== Species ===
As of January 2024, there are 65 accepted species by Plants of the World Online:

- Nymphaea abhayana A.Chowdhury & M.Chowdhury
- Nymphaea alba L.
- Nymphaea alexii S.W.L.Jacobs & Hellq.
- Nymphaea amazonum Mart. & Zucc.
- Nymphaea ampla (Salisb.) DC.
- Nymphaea atrans S.W.L.Jacobs
- Nymphaea belophylla Trickett
- Nymphaea × borealis E.G.Camus
- Nymphaea caatingae C.T.Lima & Giul.
- Nymphaea candida C.Presl
- Nymphaea carpentariae S.W.L.Jacobs & Hellq.
- Nymphaea conardii Wiersema
- Nymphaea × daubenyana W.T.Baxter ex Daubeny
- Nymphaea dimorpha I.M.Turner
- Nymphaea divaricata Hutch.
- Nymphaea elegans Hook.
- Nymphaea elleniae S.W.L.Jacobs
- Nymphaea francae C.T.Lima & Giul.
- Nymphaea gardneriana Planch.
- Nymphaea georginae S.W.L.Jacobs & Hellq.
- Nymphaea gigantea Hook.
- Nymphaea glandulifera Rodschied
- Nymphaea gracilis Zucc.
- Nymphaea guineensis Schumach. & Thonn.
- Nymphaea harleyi C.T.Lima & Giul.
- Nymphaea hastifolia Domin
- Nymphaea heudelotii Planch.
- Nymphaea immutabilis S.W.L.Jacobs
- Nymphaea jacobsii Hellq.
- Nymphaea jamesoniana Planch.
- Nymphaea kakaduensis Hellq., A.Leu & M.L.Moody
- Nymphaea kimberleyensis (S.W.L.Jacobs) S.W.L.Jacobs & Hellq.
- Nymphaea lasiophylla Mart. & Zucc.
- Nymphaea leibergii (Morong) Rydb.
- Nymphaea lingulata Wiersema
- Nymphaea loriana Wiersema, Hellq. & Borsch
- Nymphaea lotus L.
- Nymphaea lukei S.W.L.Jacobs & Hellq.
- Nymphaea macrosperma Merr. & L.M.Perry
- Nymphaea maculata Schumach. & Thonn.
- Nymphaea manipurensis Asharani & Biseshwori
- Nymphaea mexicana Zucc.
- Nymphaea micrantha Guill. & Perr.
- Nymphaea noelae S.W.L.Jacobs & Hellq.
- Nymphaea nouchali Burm.f.
- Nymphaea novogranatensis Wiersema
- Nymphaea odorata Aiton
- Nymphaea ondinea Löhne, Wiersema & Borsch
- Nymphaea oxypetala Planch.
- Nymphaea paganuccii C.T.Lima & Giul.
- Nymphaea pedersenii (Wiersema) C.T.Lima & Giul.
- Nymphaea potamophila Wiersema
- Nymphaea prolifera Wiersema
- Nymphaea pubescens Willd.
- Nymphaea pulchella DC.
- Nymphaea rapinii C.T.Lima & Giul.
- Nymphaea rubra Roxb. ex Andrews
- Nymphaea rudgeana G.Mey.
- Nymphaea siamensis Puripany.
- Nymphaea stuhlmannii (Engl.) Schweinf. & Gilg
- Nymphaea sulphurea Gilg
- Nymphaea × sundvikii Hiitonen
- Nymphaea tenuinervia Casp.
- Nymphaea tetragona Georgi
- Nymphaea thermarum Eb.Fisch.
- Nymphaea × thiona D.B.Ward
- Nymphaea vanildae C.T.Lima & Giul.
- Nymphaea vaporalis S.W.L.Jacobs & Hellq.
- Nymphaea violacea Lehm.

=== Fossil species ===
- †Nymphaea brongniartii (Caspary) Saporta
- †Nymphaea elisabethae Gee & David W. Taylor
- †Nymphaea haeringiana (Unger) Butzm., T.C. Fisch., E. Rieber
- †Nymphaea minuta Saporta

=== Evolutionary relationships ===
The genus Nymphaea may be paraphyletic in its current circumscription, as the genera Euryale and Victoria have been placed within the genus Nymphaea in several studies.

=== Etymology ===
The genus name is from the Greek νυμφαία, nymphaia and the Latin nymphaea, which means "water lily" and were inspired by the nymphs of Greek and Latin mythology.

== Distribution and habitat ==
Nymphaea has a cosmopolitan distribution and is found almost all over the world, apart from New Zealand and the pacific slope of North America. It occurs in freshwater, as well as brackish water habitats. Water lily species often have a very wide distribution.

== Ecology ==
=== Pollination ===
Flowers of Nymphaea subg. Hydrocallis are pollinated by Cyclocephala beetles. Likewise, beetle pollination by Ruteloryctes morio, a member of the same Cyclocephalini tribe, has been reported in Nymphaea subg. Lotos. The subgenera Nymphaea subg. Anecphya and Nymphaea subg. Brachyceras are pollinated by bees and flies. The subgenus Nymphaea subg. Nymphaea is pollinated by bees, flies and beetles.

=== Herbivory ===
Many birds feed on seeds and fruits of Nymphaea.

=== Invasive species ===
Outside of its natural habitat, N. mexicana and hybrids thereof have become invasive weeds. It has been proposed to employ the weevil species Bagous longulus as a biocontrol agent against Nymphaea mexicana in South Africa. Invasive horticultural hybrids can pose a threat to Nymphaea species through introgressive hybridisation. The naturalised hybrids can displace native species and mask their disappearance, as it can be difficult to distinguish between species and naturalised hybrids.

== Conservation ==
Several species are in danger of extinction. Nymphaea thermarum is classified as critically endangered (CR), Nymphaea loriana is classified as endangered (EN), Nymphaea stuhlmannii is classified as endangered (EN), and Nymphaea nouchali var. mutandaensis is also classified as endangered (EN).

== Cultivation ==
Water lilies are not only decorative, but also provide useful shade which helps reduce the growth of algae in ponds and lakes and some species are keeping in aquariums. an example is nymphaea lotus. Many of the water lilies familiar in water gardening are hybrids and cultivars. These cultivars have gained the Royal Horticultural Society's Award of Garden Merit:

- 'Escarboucle' (orange-red)
- 'Gladstoniana' (double white flowers with prominent yellow stamens)
- 'Gonnère' (double white scented flowers)
- 'James Brydon;' (cupped rose-red flowers)
- 'Marliacea Chromatella' (pale yellow flowers)
- 'Pygmaea Helvola' (miniature, with cupped fragrant yellow flowers)

== Toxicity ==
All water lilies are poisonous and contain an alkaloid called nupharin in almost all of their parts.

== Uses ==
=== Culinary ===
Despite their toxicity, water lilies have some reported uses as food.

In India, it has mostly been eaten as a famine food or as a medicinal (both cooked).

In Sri Lanka it was formerly eaten as a type of medicine and its price was too high to serve as a normal meal, but in the 1940s or earlier some villagers began to grow water lilies in the paddy fields left uncultivated during the monsoon season (Yala season), and the price dropped. The tubers are called manel here and eaten boiled and in curries.

In West Africa, usage varied between cultures, in the Upper Guinea, the rhizomes were only considered famine foods; here the tubers were either roasted in ashes, or dried and ground into a flour. The Buduma people ate the seeds and rhizomes. Some tribes ate the rhizomes raw. The Hausa people of Ghana, Nigeria and the people of Southern Sudan used the tubers of N. lotus, the seeds (inside the tubers) are locally referred to as 'gunsi' in Ghana. They are ground into flour.

The plants were also said to be eaten in the Philippines. In the 1950s there were no records of leaves or flowers being eaten.

In a North American species, the boiled young leaves and unopened flower buds are said to be edible. The seeds, high in starch, protein, and oil, may be popped, parched, or ground into flour. Potato-like tubers can be collected from the species N. tuberosa (=N. odorata).

Water lilies were said to have been a major food source for a certain tribe of indigenous Australians in 1930, with the flowers and stems eaten raw, while the "roots and seedpods" were cooked either on an open fire or in a ground oven.

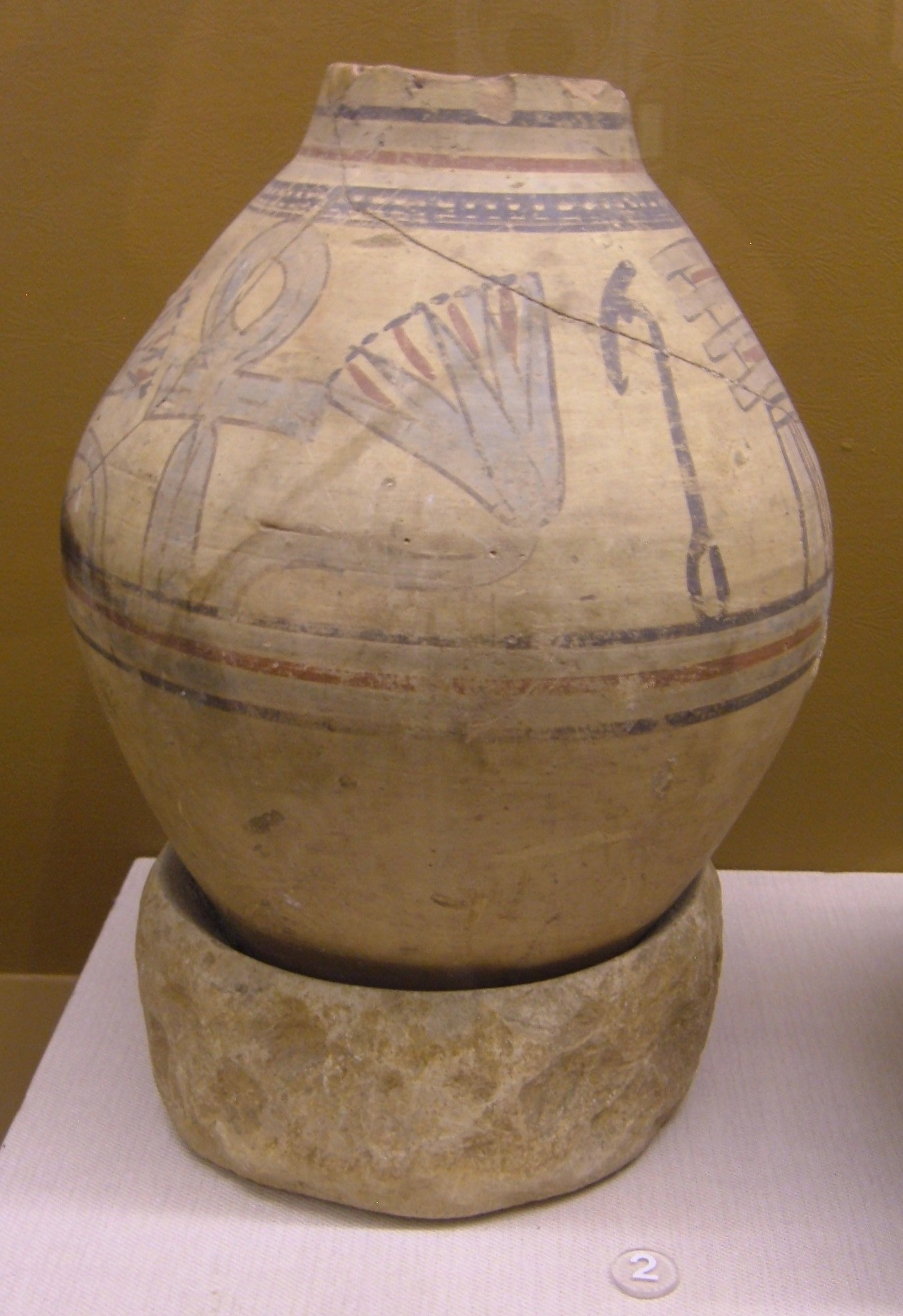
Blue lotus (N. caerulea) on an 18th Dynasty jar found at Amarna

=== Other uses ===
Tannins extracted from rhizomes are used in dyeing wool a purple-black or brown colour. The peduncles are used as pipes to smoke tobacco.

== Culture ==
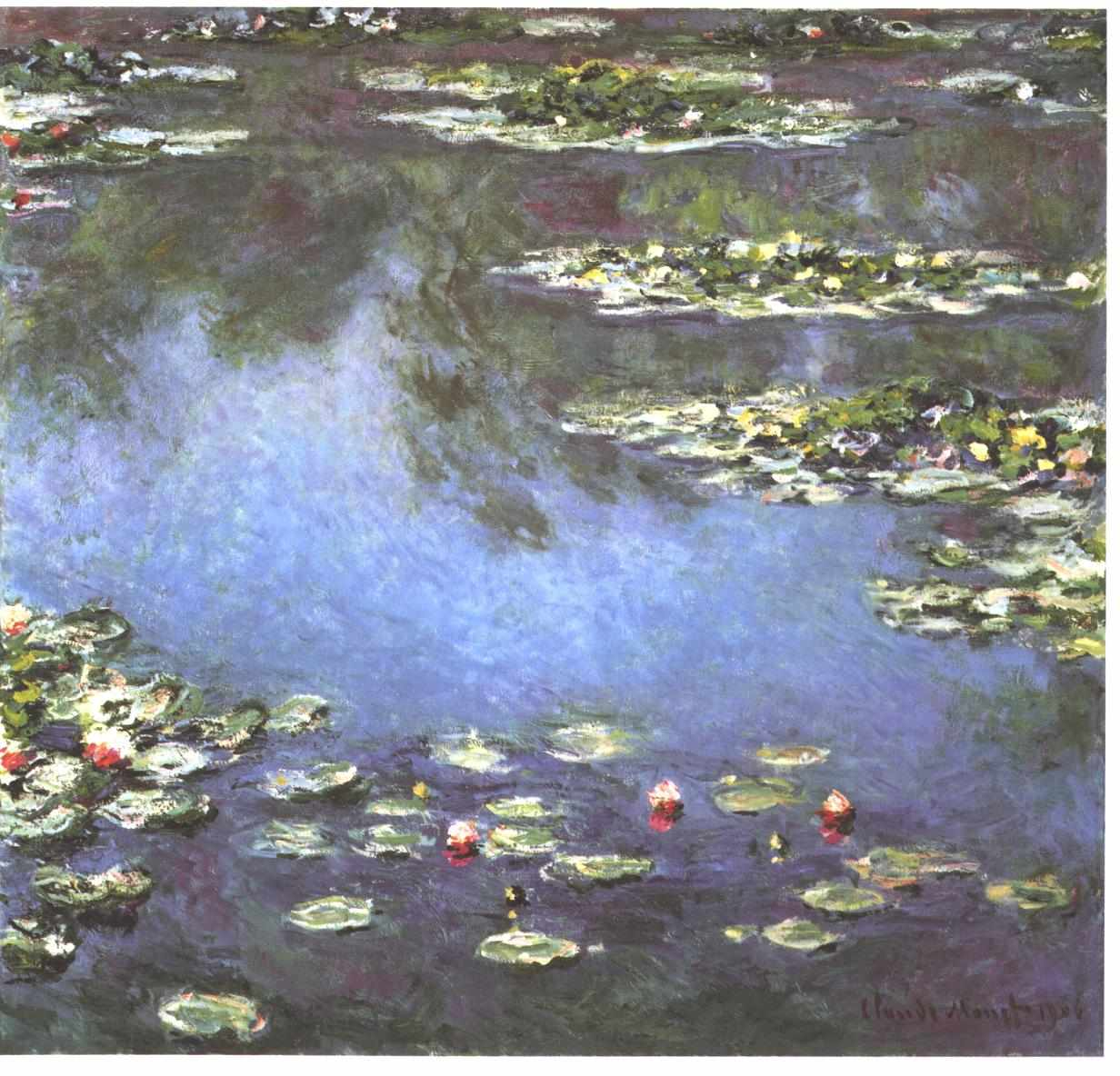
Water Lilies by Claude Monet, 1906

The Ancient Egyptians used the water lilies of the Nile as cultural symbols. Since 1580 it has become popular in the English language to apply the Latin word lotus, originally used to designate a tree, to the water lilies growing in Egypt, and much later the word was used to translate words in Indian texts. The lotus motif is a frequent feature of temple column architecture. In Egypt, the lotus, rising from the bottom mud to unfold its petals to the sun, suggested the glory of the sun's own emergence from the primaeval slime. It was a metaphor of creation. It was a symbol of the fertility gods and goddesses as well as a symbol of the upper Nile as the giver of life.

A Roman belief existed that drinking a liquid of crushed Nymphaea in vinegar for 10 consecutive days turned a boy into a eunuch.

A Syrian terra-cotta plaque from the 14th–13th centuries BC shows the goddess Asherah holding two lotus blossoms. An ivory panel from the 9th-8th centuries BC shows the god Horus seated on a lotus blossom, flanked by two cherubs.

The French Impressionist painter Claude Monet is known for his many paintings of water lilies in the pond in his garden at Giverny.

N. nouchali is the national flower of Bangladesh and Sri Lanka.

Water lilies are also used as ritual narcotics. According to one source, this topic "was the subject of a lecture by William Emboden given at Nash Hall of the Harvard Botanical Museum on the morning of April 6, 1979".

A Nymphaea flower in the coat of arms of Pälkäne

Lotus symbol of the Sasanian Empire flag

== Gallery ==
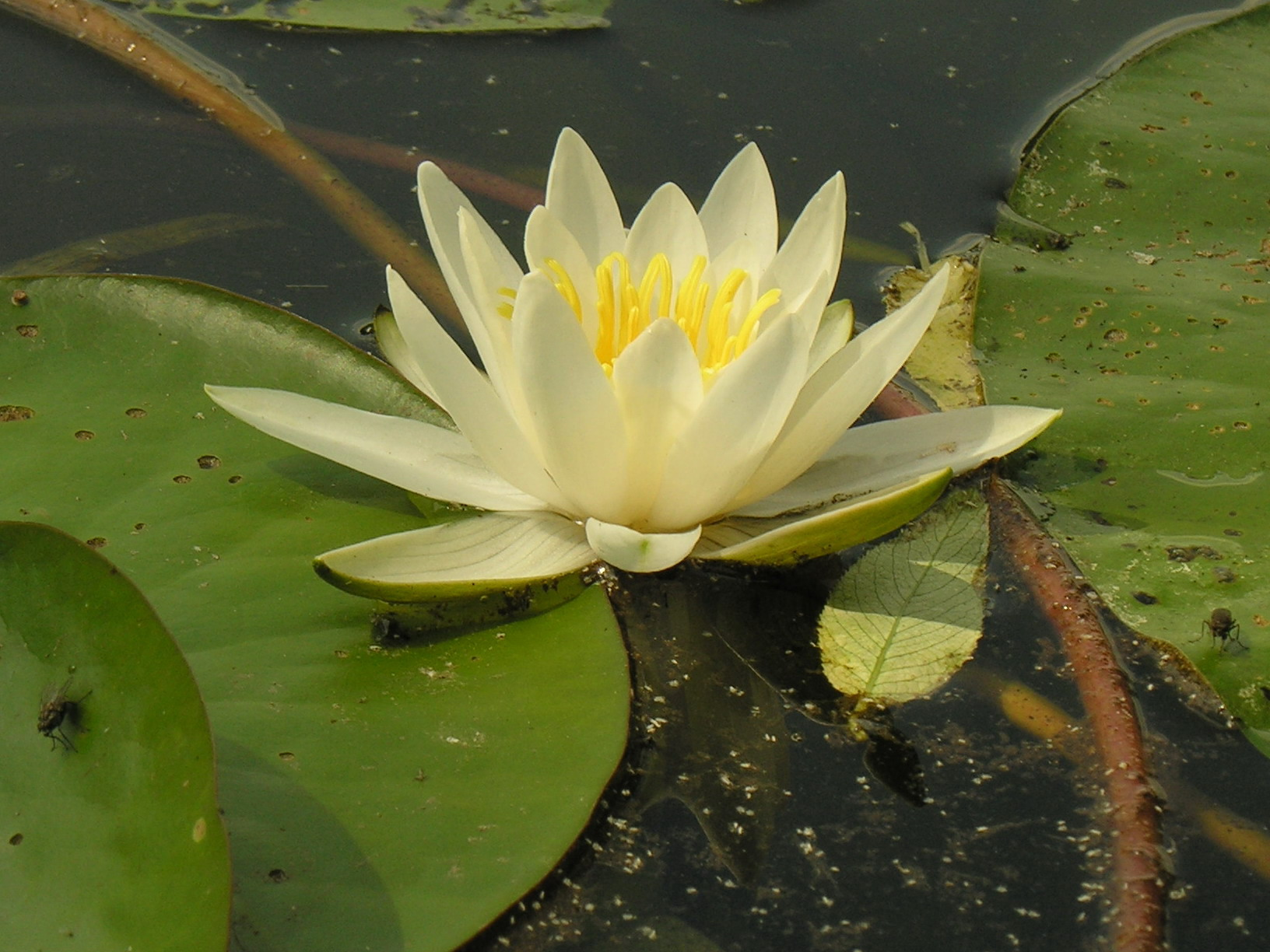
Nymphaea alba

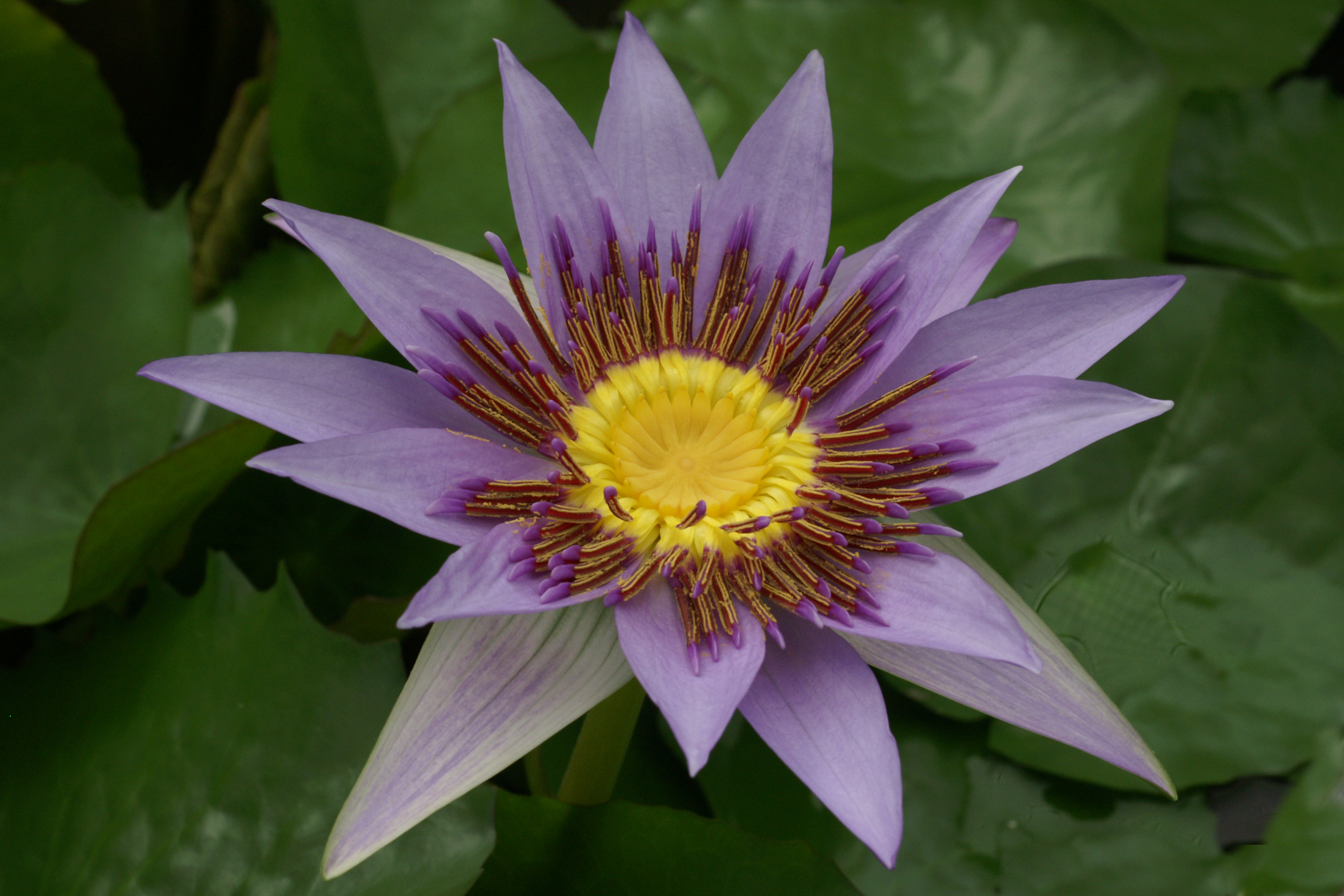
Nymphaea nouchali var. zanzibariensis

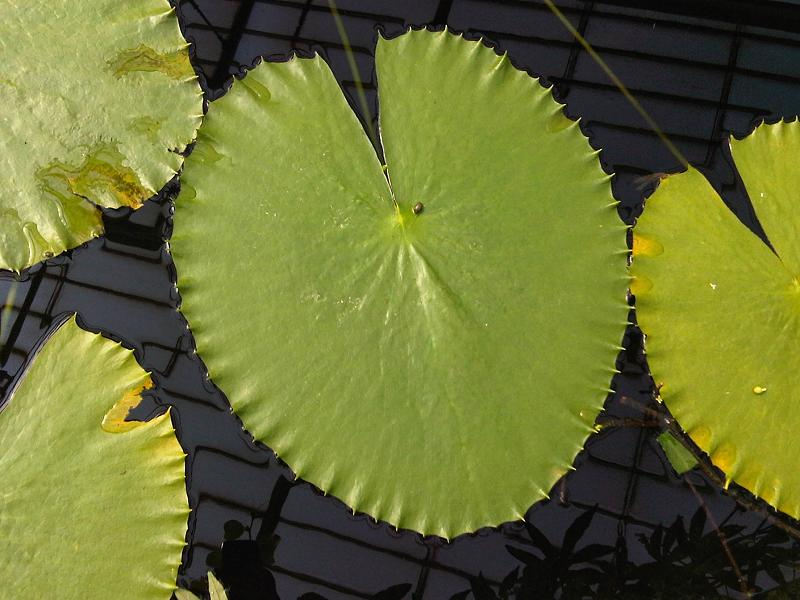
Nymphaea gigantea

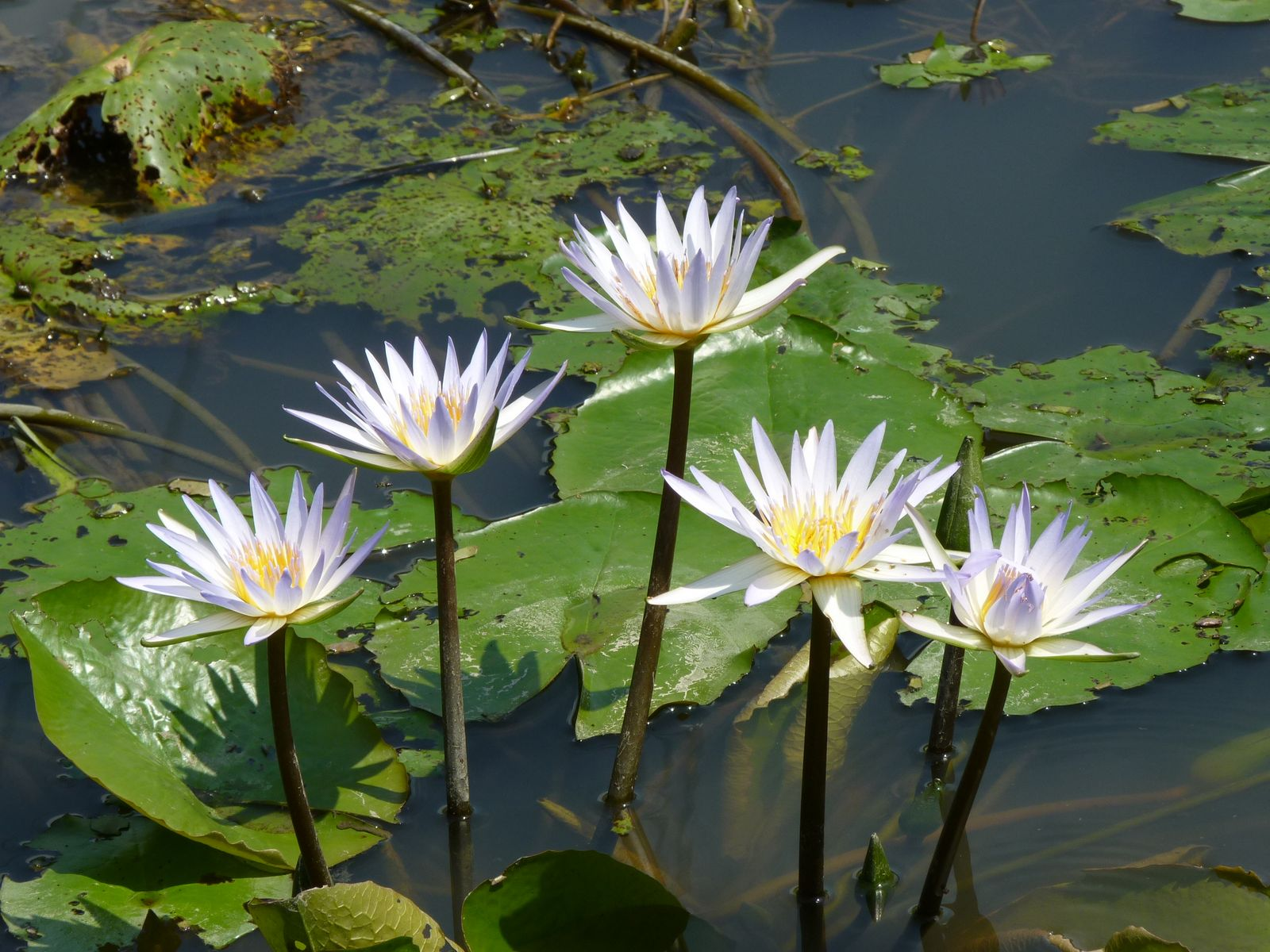
Nymphaea nouchali

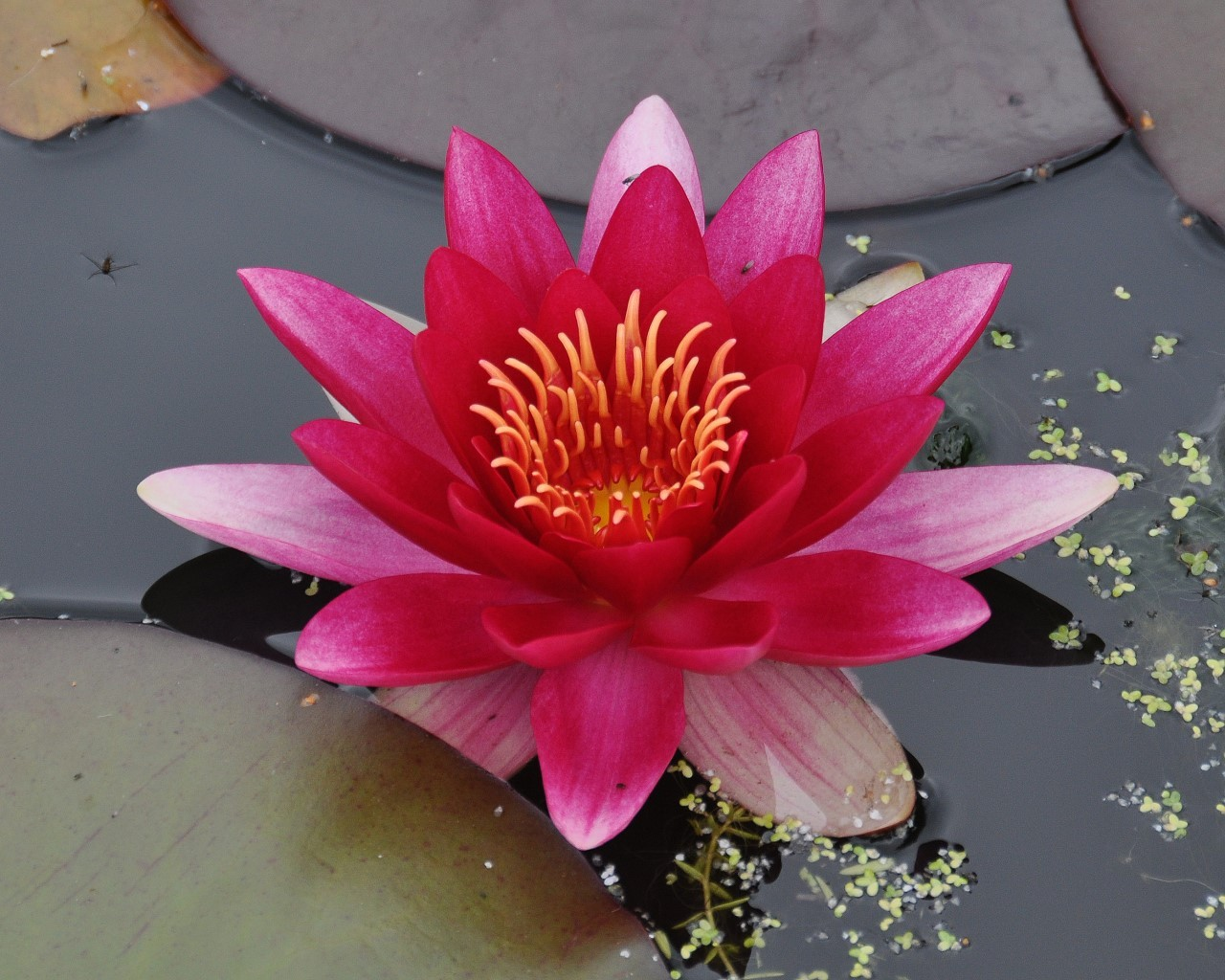
Nymphaea 'Attraction'

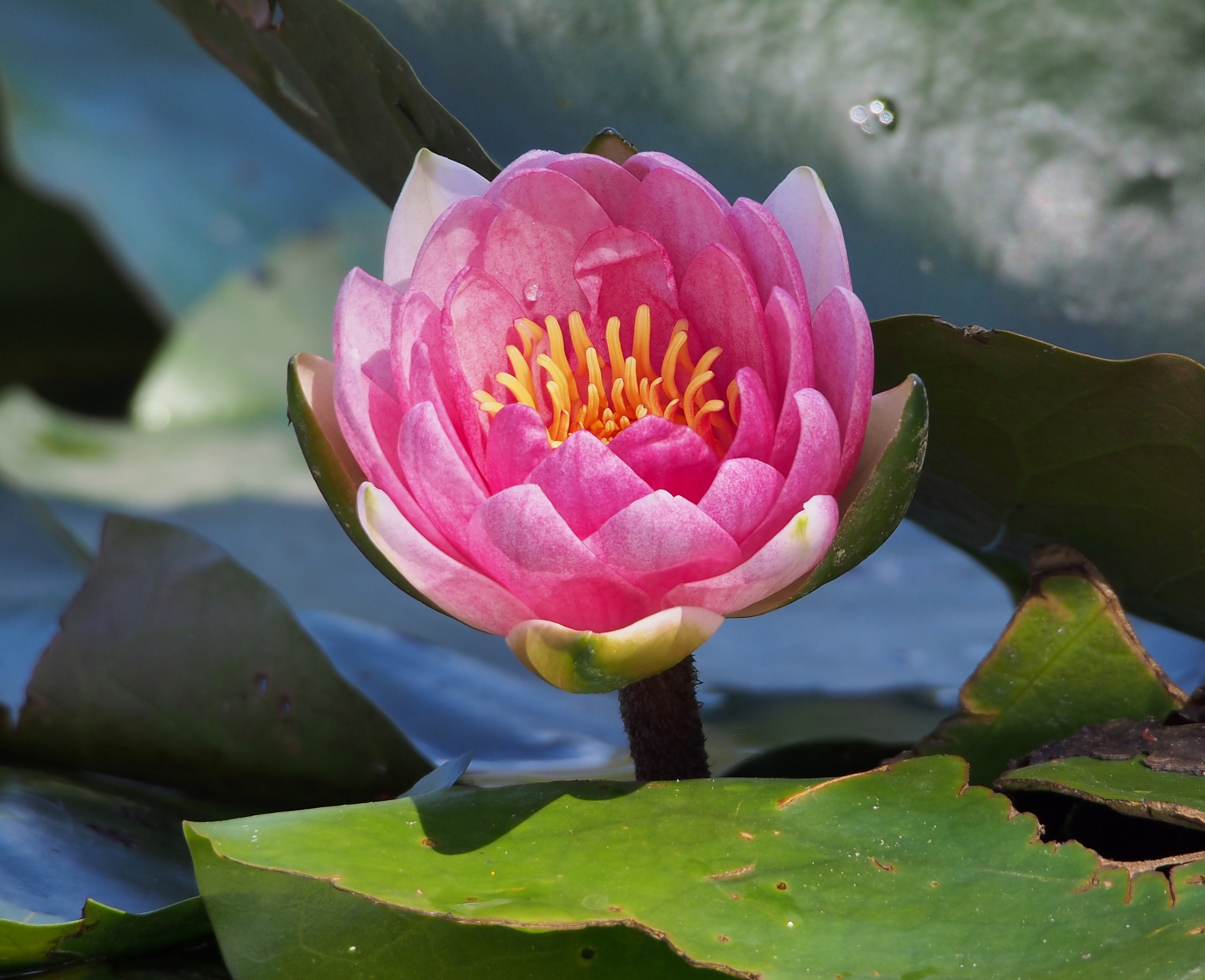
Nymphaea 'Laydekeri Purpurata'

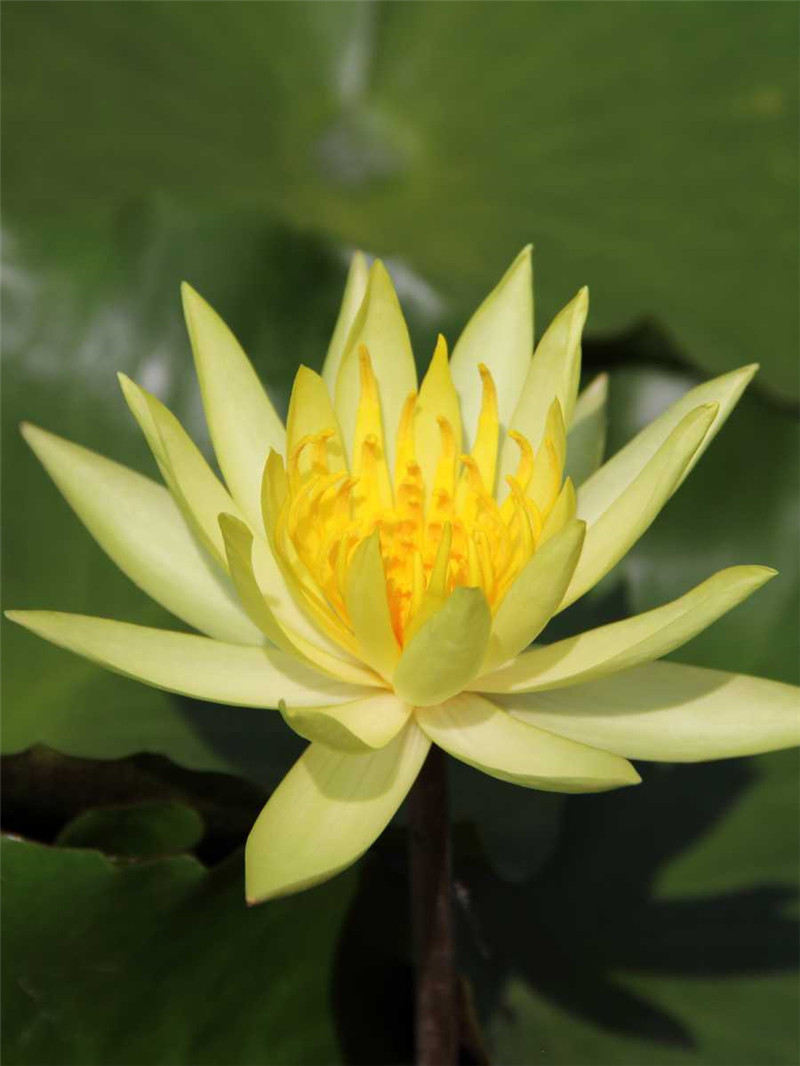
Nymphaea mexicana

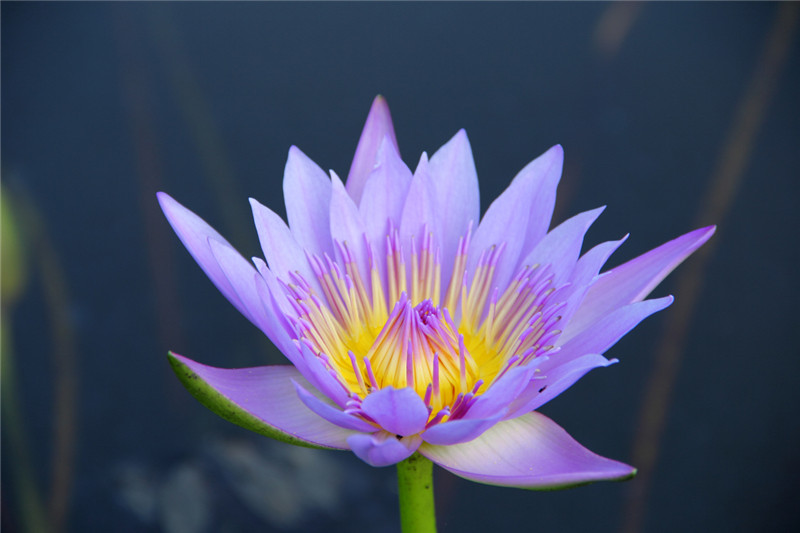
Nymphaea nouchali var. caerulea

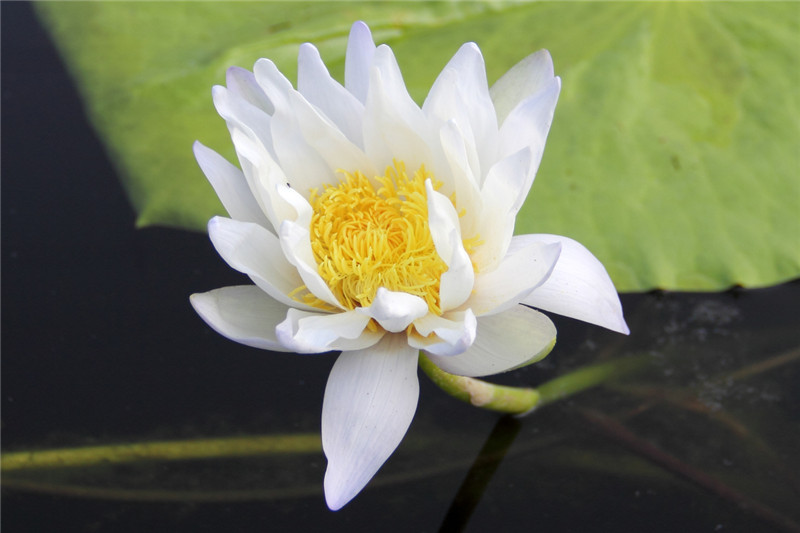
Nymphaea sp.

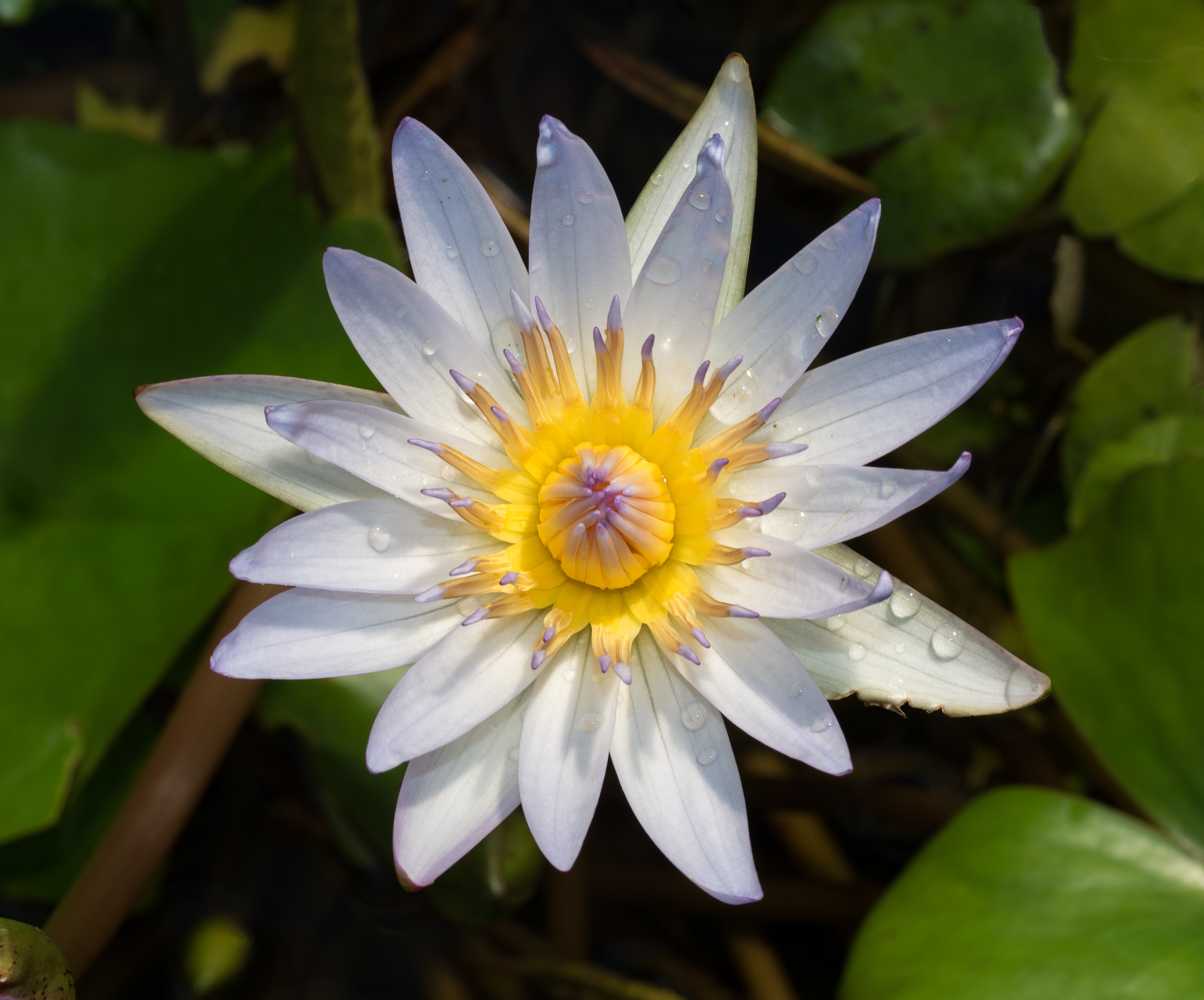
Nymphaea × daubenyana

== See also ==
- Albert de Lestang, propagator and seed collector
- List of plants known as lily
