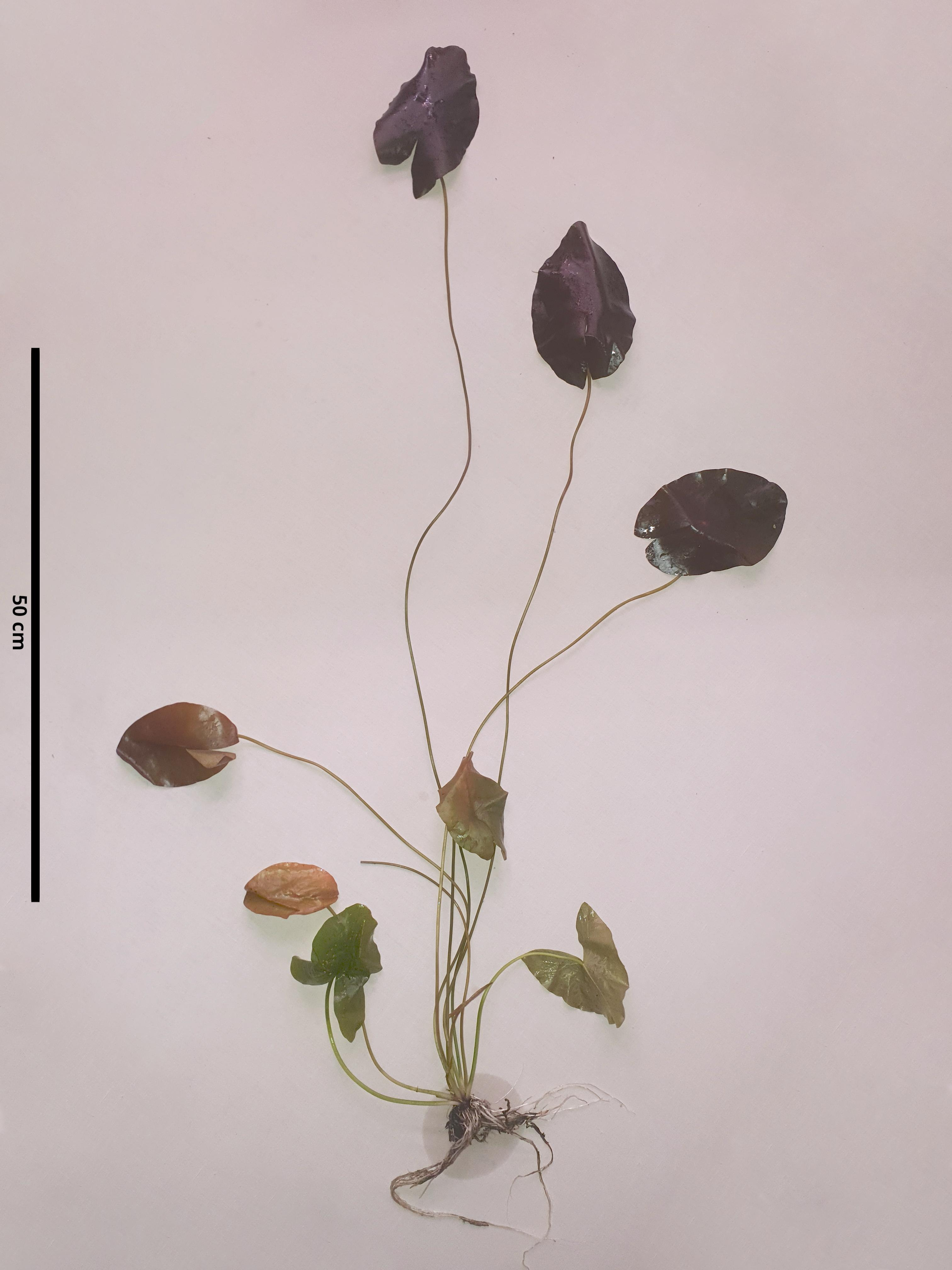
- Nymphaea cf. gardneriana Planch. with several floating leaves, as well as submerged leaves with scale bar (50 cm)

Scientific classification
- Kingdom: Plantae
- Clade: Tracheophytes
- Clade: Angiosperms
- Order: Nymphaeales
- Family: Nymphaeaceae
- Genus: Nymphaea
- Subgenus: Nymphaea subg. Hydrocallis
- Species: N. gardneriana

Binomial name
- Nymphaea gardneriana Planch.

Synonyms
- Leuconymphaea gardneriana (Planch.) Kuntze; Nymphaea fragrans Gardner ex Casp.; Nymphaea passiflora Lehm.; Nymphaea stenaspidota Casp.; Nymphaea wittiana Ule

= Nymphaea gardneriana =

Species of water lily

Nymphaea gardneriana is a species of waterlily native to Cuba and tropical South America.

== Description ==
=== Vegetative characteristics ===
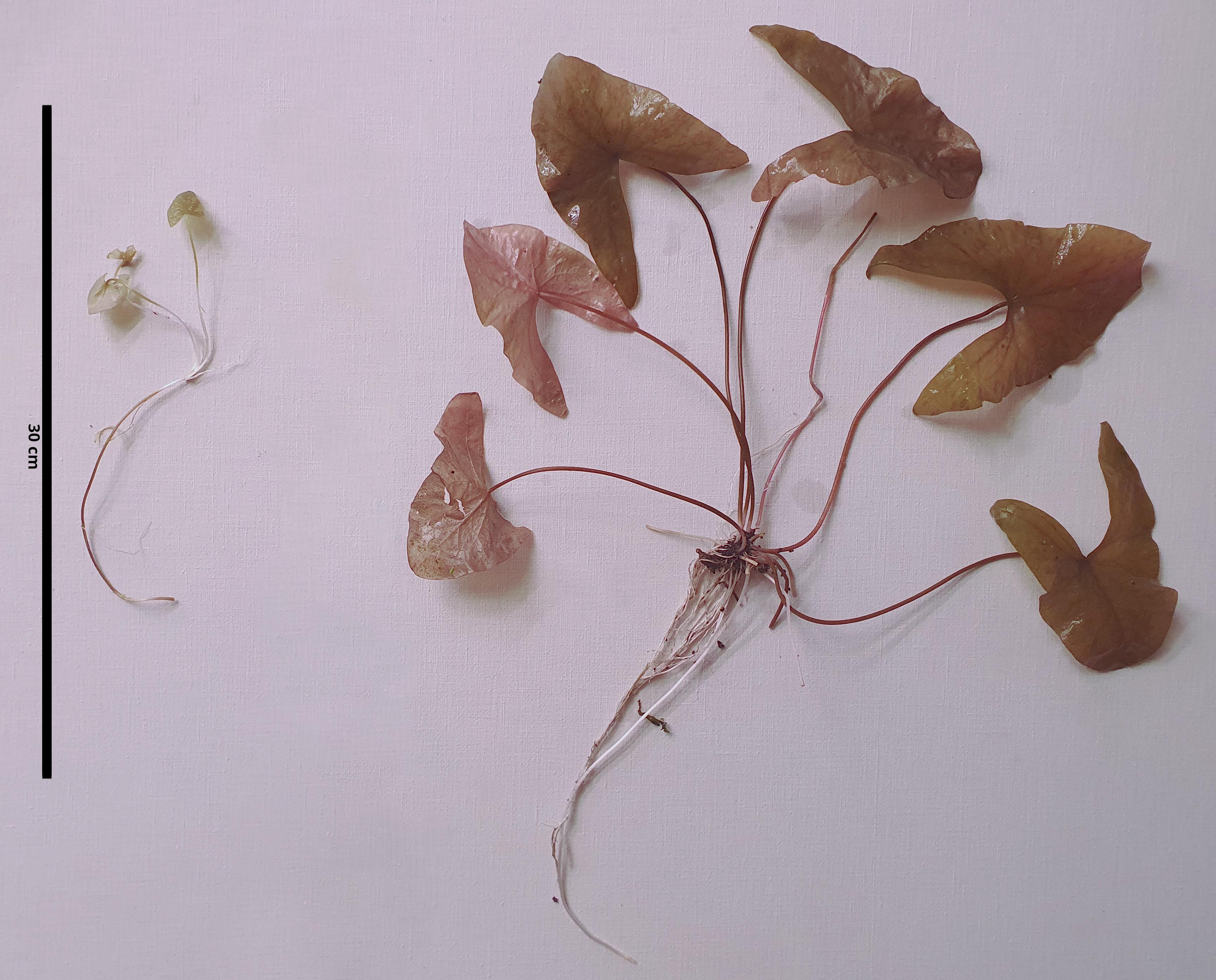
Submerged form of Nymphaea gardneriana Planch. with a separated stolon and scale bar (30 cm)

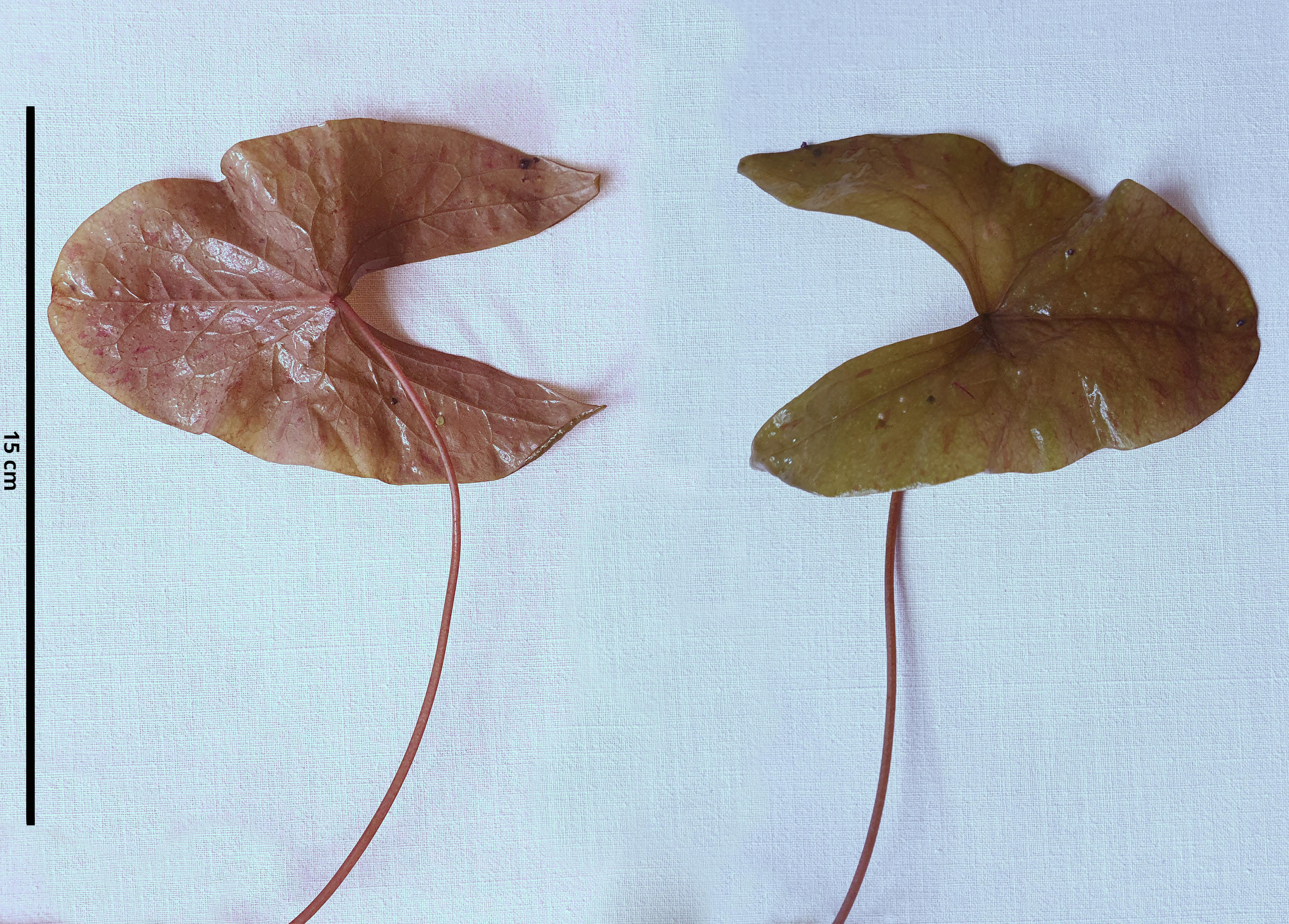
Submerged leaf of Nymphaea gardneriana Planch. showing both sides with scale bar (15 cm)

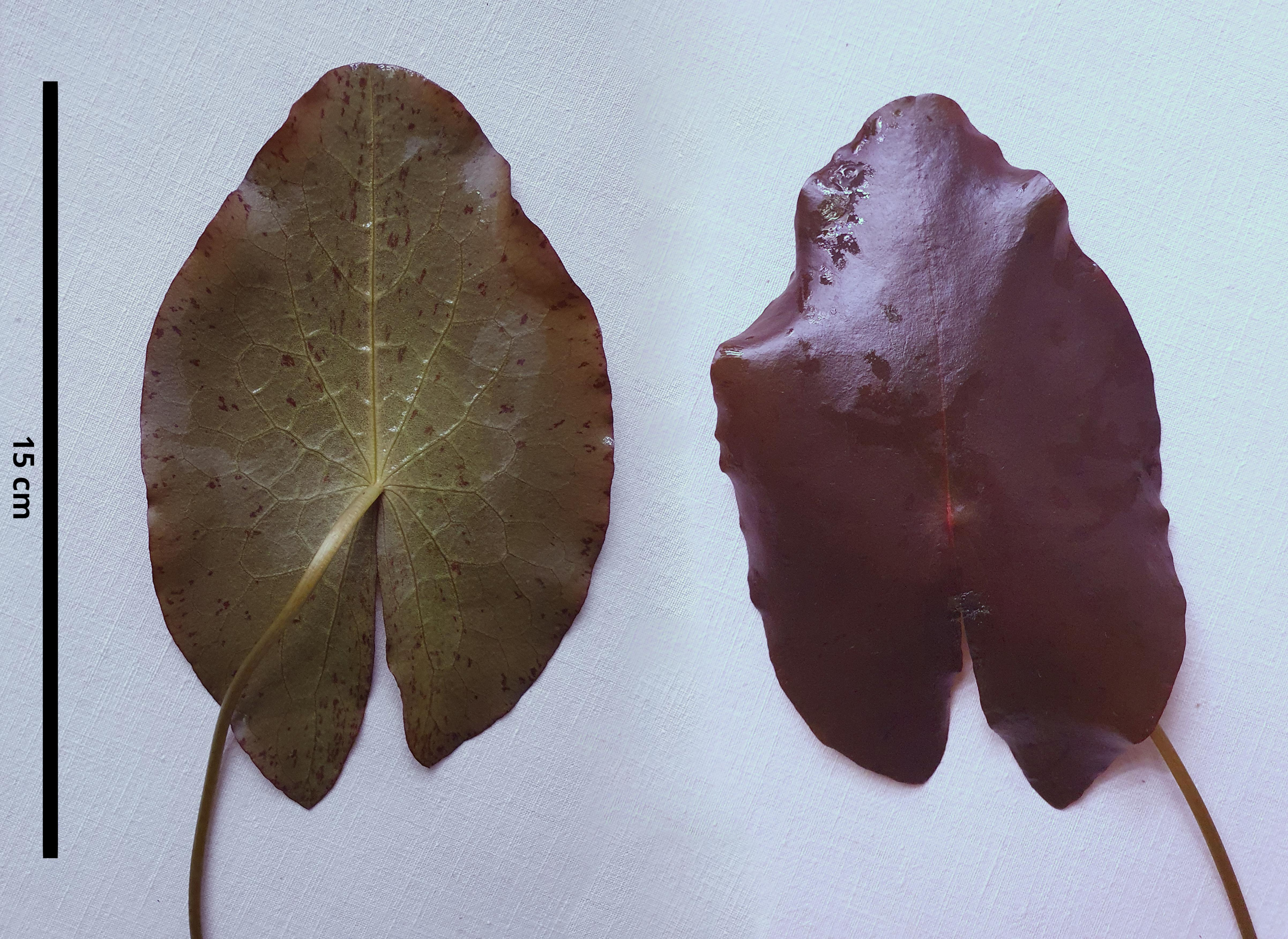
Floating leaf of Nymphaea cf. gardneriana Planch. with scale bar (15 cm)

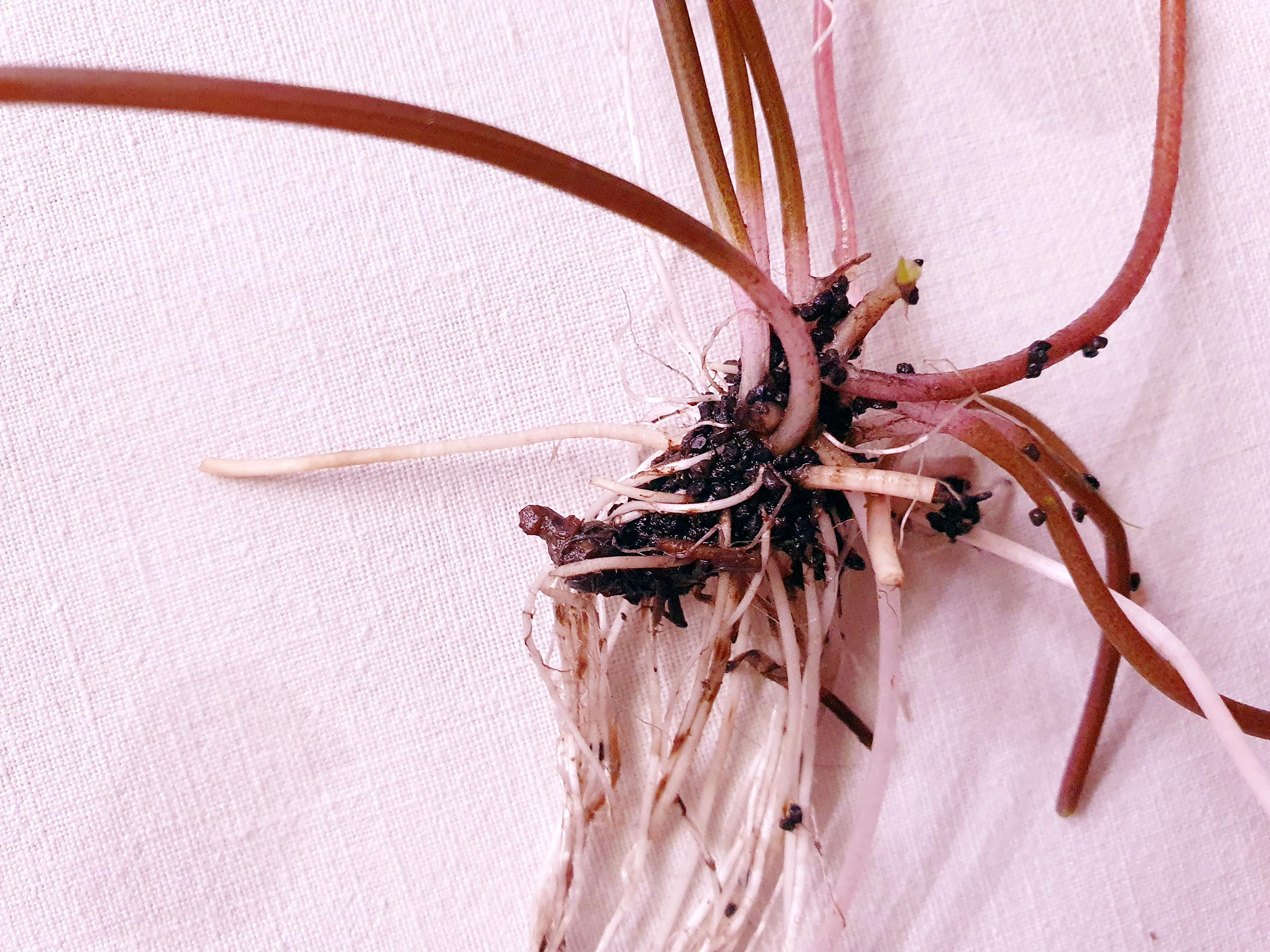
Stem and root system of Nymphaea gardneriana Planch.

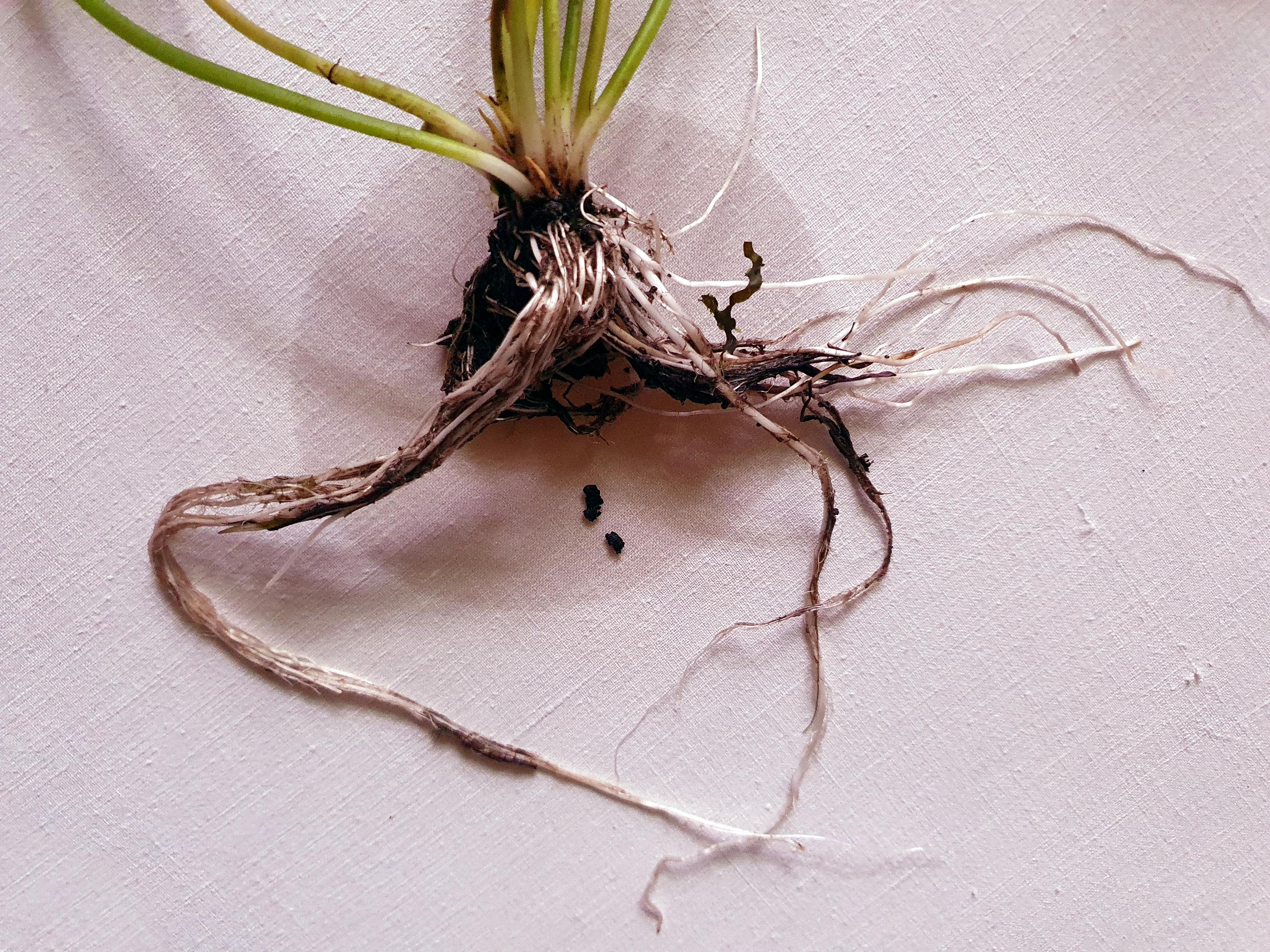
Stem and root system of Nymphaea cf. gardneriana Planch.

Nymphaea gardneriana is a polymorphic species. It exhibits a high degree of phenotypic plasticity and adapts its shape in response to different environmental conditions. Its stoloniferous rhizome is ovoid. Floating leaves have five, or rarely 4, primary veins. The leaf surface is glabrous and marked with irregular violet spotting. The colouration of the foliage varies with the light intensity it is exposed to. In direct sun, the leaves turn bright red due to anthocyanins, providing protection of tissues against radiation damage through sunlight.

=== Generative characteristics ===
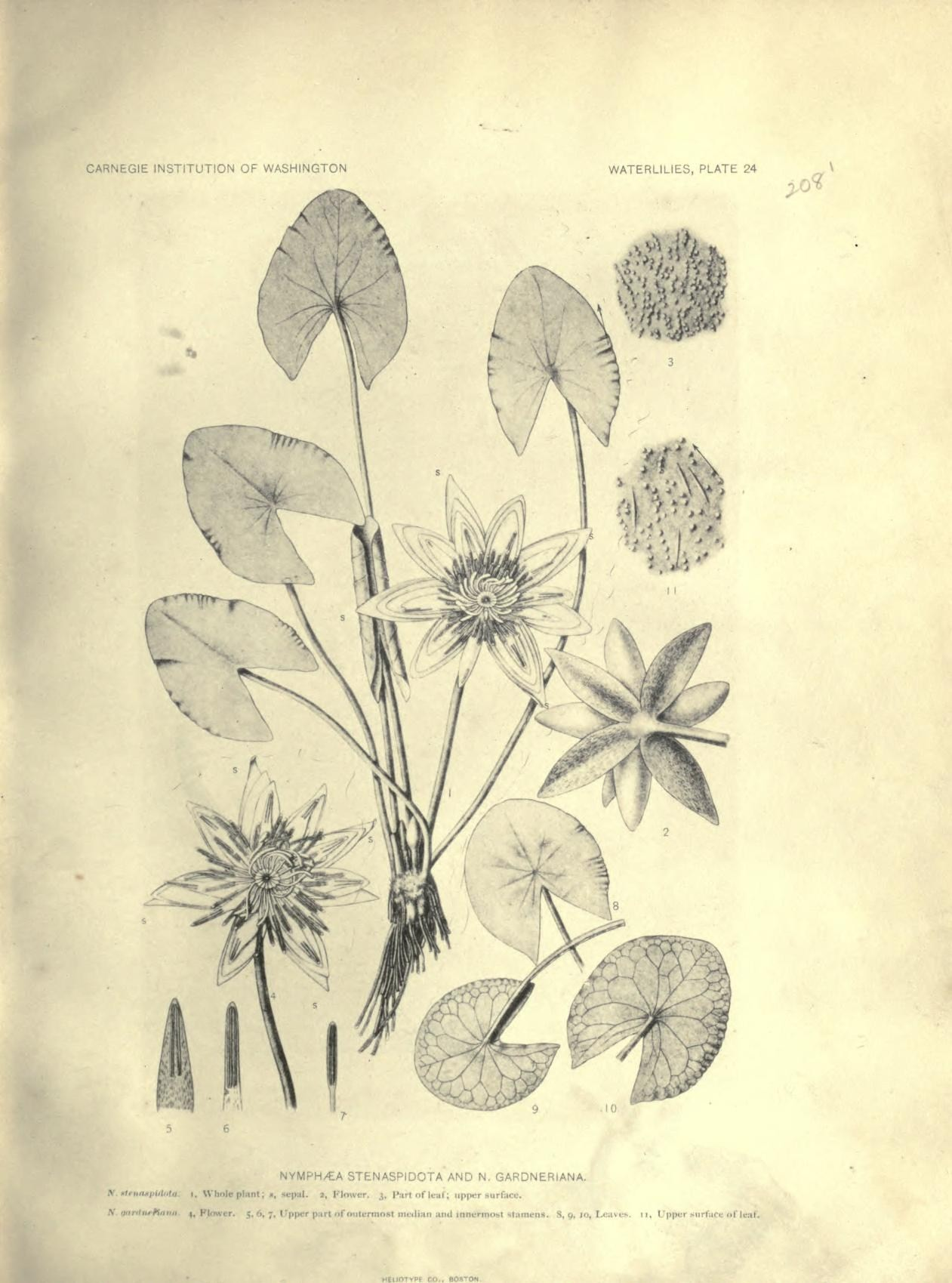
Botanical illustration of Nymphaea gardneriana

Methyl hexanoate, one of the primary compounds of the floral fragrance of Nymphaea gardneriana

The floating flowers are attached to the stem by an up to 6 mm wide, glabrous peduncle with 5-6 central primary and 10-12 peripheral secondary air channels. The floral fragrance has been described as very pleasant. It has also been described as pungent, fermented, fruity, or solvent-like. It is primarily composed of methyl hexanoate and methyl 2-methylbutanoate. The floral fragrance is primarily emitted from the innermost tepals, as well as petaloid stamens.

== Cytology ==
The chromosome count is n = 14.

== Reproduction ==
=== Vegetative reproduction ===
In most populations the main mode of reproduction is through the formation of stolons. Each individual plant is capable of forming many stolons.

=== Generative reproduction ===
In natural settings, fruits are rarely produced, although Nymphaea gardneriana easily sets fruit through artificial pollination in cultivation. Sexual reproduction occurs rarely and the main modus of reproduction relies on vegetative reproduction through stolons. It does not form tubiferous flowers.

== Habitat ==
This adaptable plant can thrive in various freshwater environments. In rivers, it displays a submerged growth pattern, while in lakes, it develops floating leaves. For example, it has been documented in the Sucuri River in Brazil, known for its clear water. Additionally, it can be found in both natural and artificial lakes within the Pantanal, characterised by clayey soils and murky water rich in organic matter.

== Taxonomy ==
It was first described by Jules Émile Planchon in 1852.

=== Type specimen ===
The type specimen was collected by Mr. G. Gardner in Brazil.

=== Placement within Nymphaea ===
It is placed in Nymphaea subg. Hydrocallis.

== Conservation ==
In Cuba, it is considered to be endangered. Current threats include the loss and degradation of habitats caused by blockage and pollution from waste, agricultural practices, subsistence livestock, and the impact of invasive species.

== Ecology ==
Nymphaea gardneriana, among other Nymphaea species, serves as an important component in the trophic chain of aquatic ecosystems by providing shelter for aquatic organisms.

=== Pollination ===
Species of Nymphaea subgenus Hydrocallis are pollinated by beetles of the genus Cyclocephala.

=== Herbivory ===
There have been reports of birds seeking the rhizomes of Nymphaea gardneriana when the water levels in the swamp decline.

The articulated laticifers present in the two outer whorls of tepals may have a protective function against herbivores and microorganisms.

== Cultivation ==
Nymphaea gardneriana is an uncommon in the aquarium cultivation. It can be cultivated in clay, loam, or sandy soil. Propagating Nymphaea gardneriana is achievable through division.
