= Nymphaea minuta =

Nymphaea minuta Temporal range: Aquitanian Aquitanian (23.03 – 20.44 Ma)

Scientific classification
- Kingdom: Plantae
- Clade: Tracheophytes
- Clade: Angiosperms
- Order: Nymphaeales
- Family: Nymphaeaceae
- Genus: Nymphaea
- Species: †N. minuta

Binomial name
- †Nymphaea minuta Saporta

Fossil species of aquatic plant

Nymphaea minuta is a fossil species in the family Nymphaeaceae from the Aquitanian of Manosque, Alpes-de-Haute-Provence, France. It is known from a leaf fossil.

== Description ==
The minute, petiolate, ovate to cordate leaf has an entire margin and an obtuse apex. The leaf base is cordate, and the basal lobes are slightly diverging. The petiole is thin.

== Taxonomy ==
It was first validly published by Gaston de Saporta in 1891, after it had invalidly been described by Saporta one year before. It has been described as very similar to Nymphaea pygmaea and Nymphaea tetragona. Saporta suggested Nymphaea minuta may represent an ancestral species of Nymphaea pygmaea.

=== Etymology ===
The specific epithet minuta from the Latin minutus means very small.

=== Homonyms ===
It has several homonyms: Nymphaea minuta V.P. Nikitin was published by Vadim Petrovich Nikitin in 1964 and then again in 2007. The correct name is Nymphaea nikitinii Doweld published by Alexander Borisovitch Doweld in 2022. Nymphaea minuta K.C.Landon, R.A.Edwards & Nozaic was published by Kenneth C. Landon, Richard A. Edwards, and P. Ivan Nozaic in 2006. The corrected name is Nymphaea dimorpha I.M.Turner published by Ian Mark Turner in 2014.
