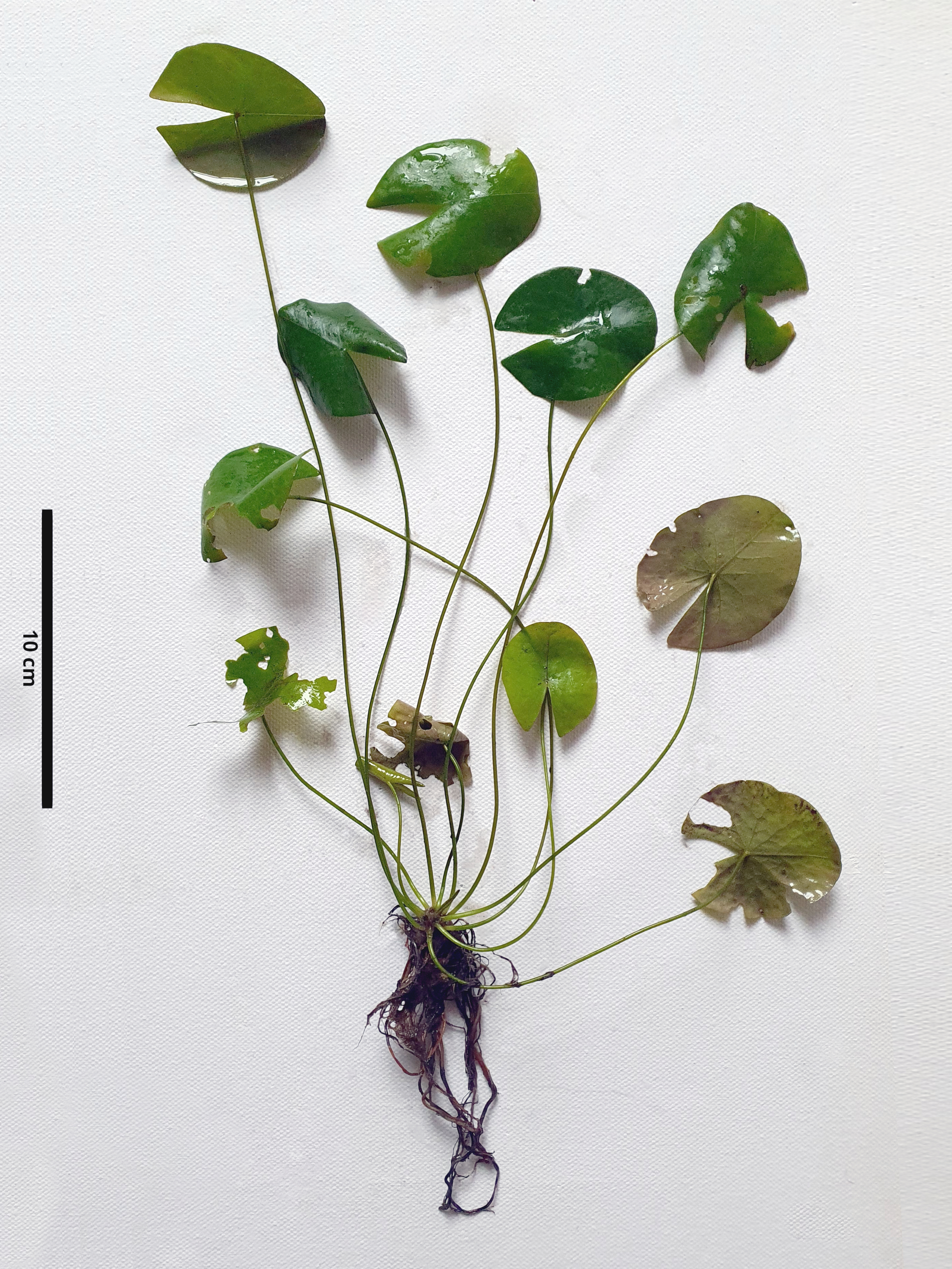
- Nymphaea dimorpha I.M.Turner with scale bar (10 cm) against a white background
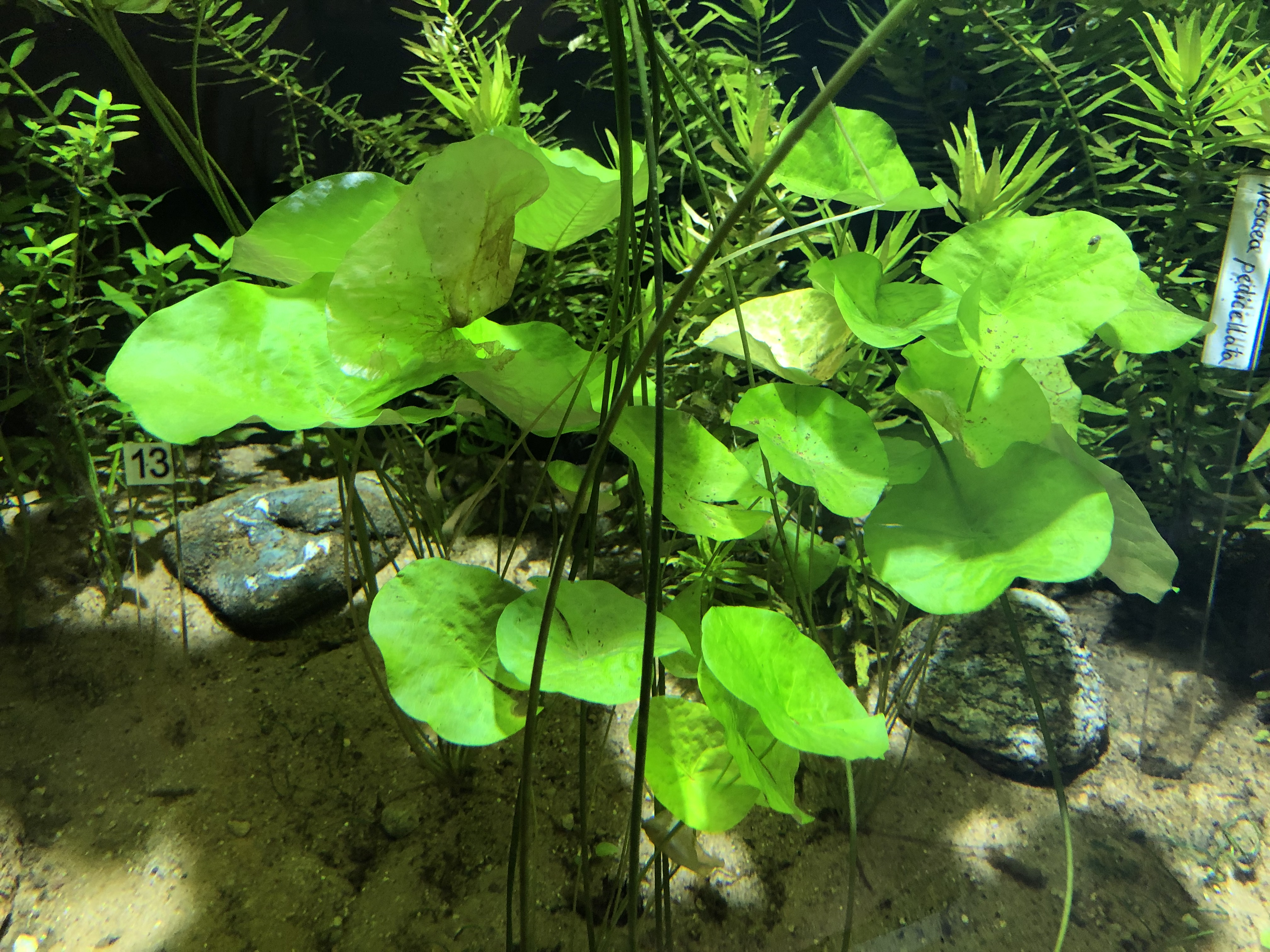
- Nymphaea dimorpha cultivated in the Berlin Botanical Garden and Botanical Museum

Scientific classification
- Kingdom: Plantae
- Clade: Embryophytes
- Clade: Tracheophytes
- Clade: Spermatophytes
- Clade: Angiosperms
- Order: Nymphaeales
- Family: Nymphaeaceae
- Genus: Nymphaea
- Subgenus: Nymphaea subg. Brachyceras
- Species: N. dimorpha

Binomial name
- Nymphaea dimorpha I.M.Turner
- Nymphaea dimorpha is endemic to Madagascar

Synonyms
- Nymphaea minuta K.C.Landon, R.A.Edwards & Nozaic

= Nymphaea dimorpha =

Species of water lily

Nymphaea dimorpha is a species of waterlily endemic to Madagascar.

== Description ==
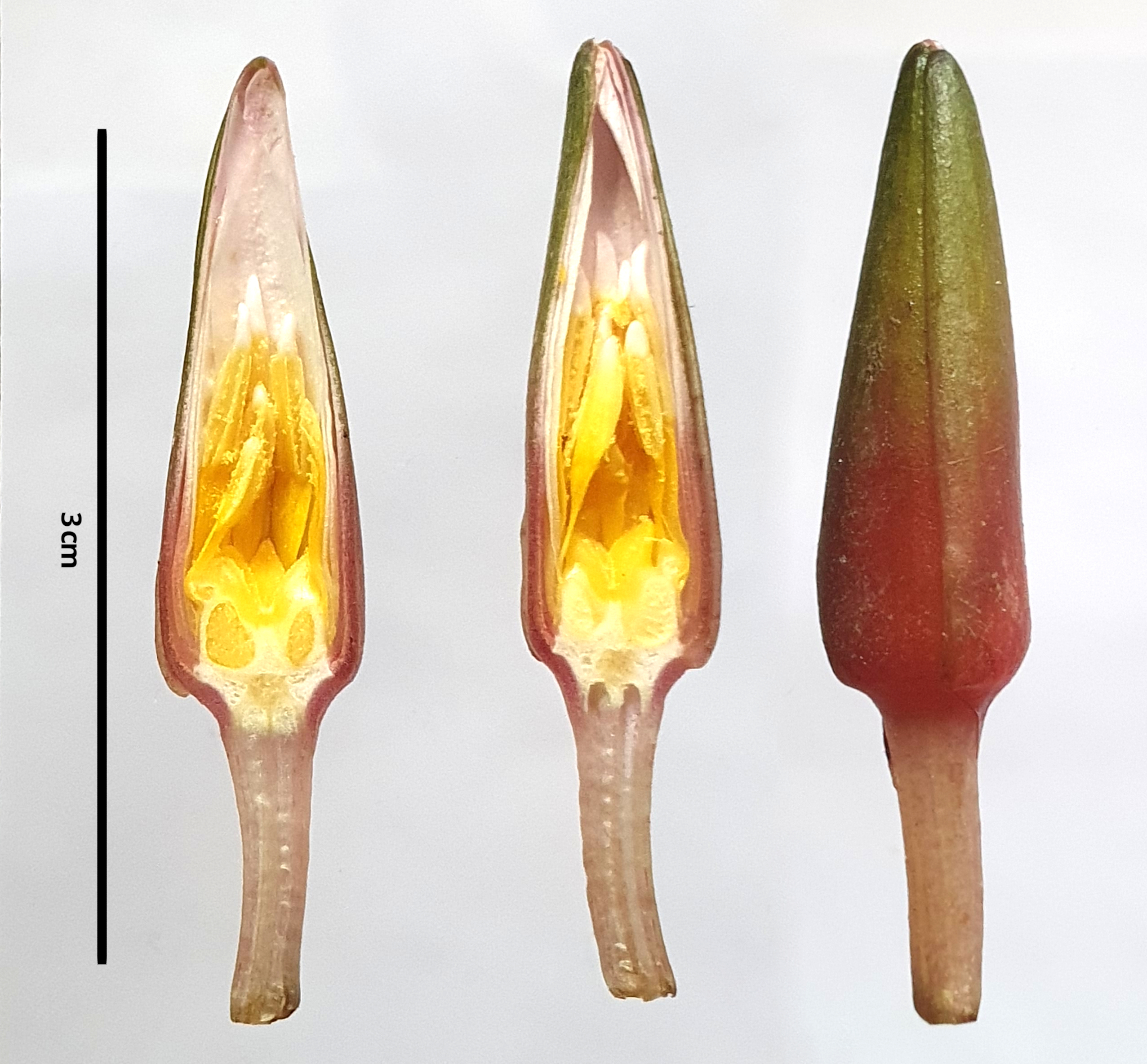
Detail of cleistogamous flower with scale bar (3 cm)

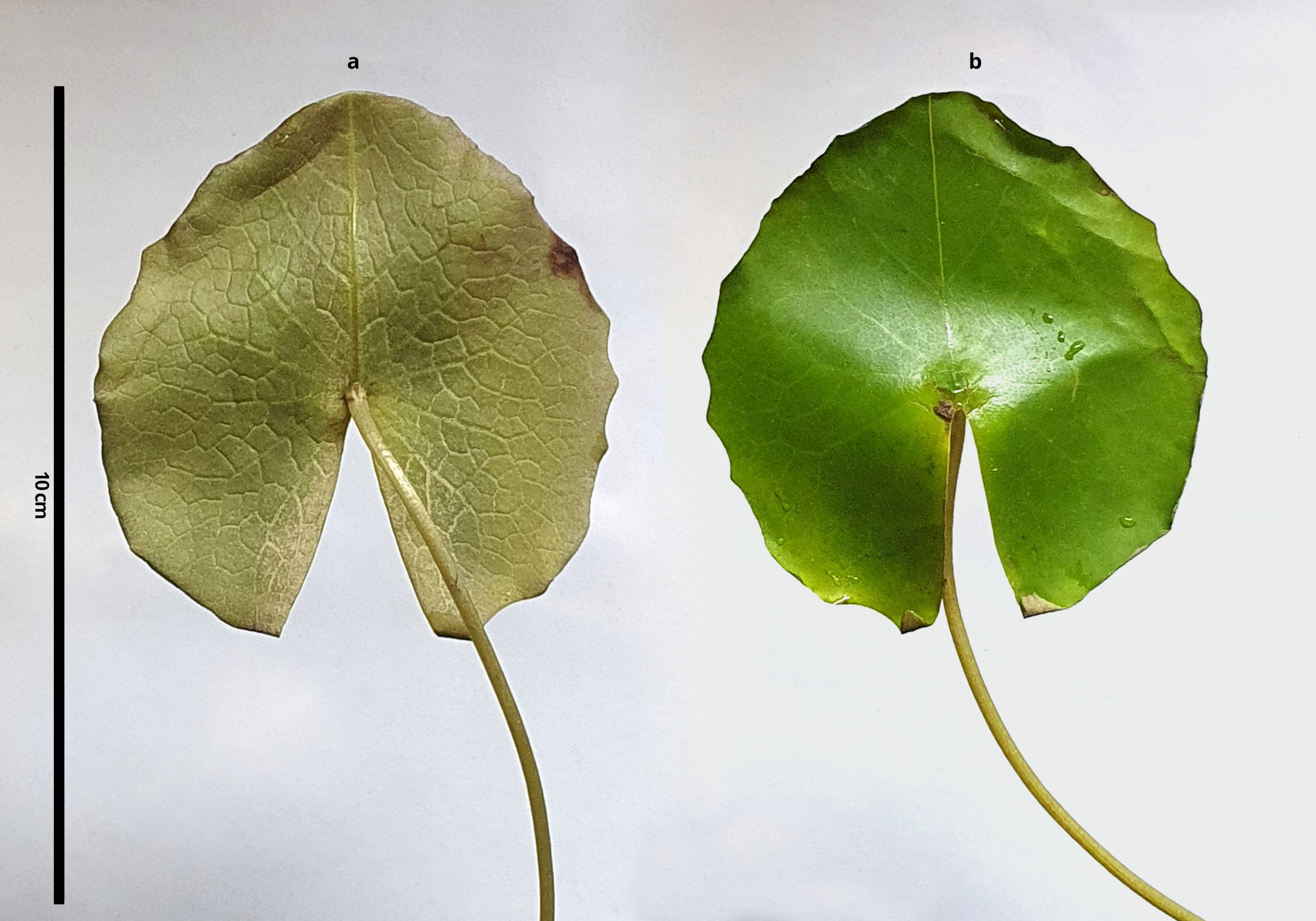
Surface leaf with scale bar (10 cm). The abaxial leaf surface (a) is depicted on the left side of the image. The adaxial leaf surface (b) is depicted on the right side.

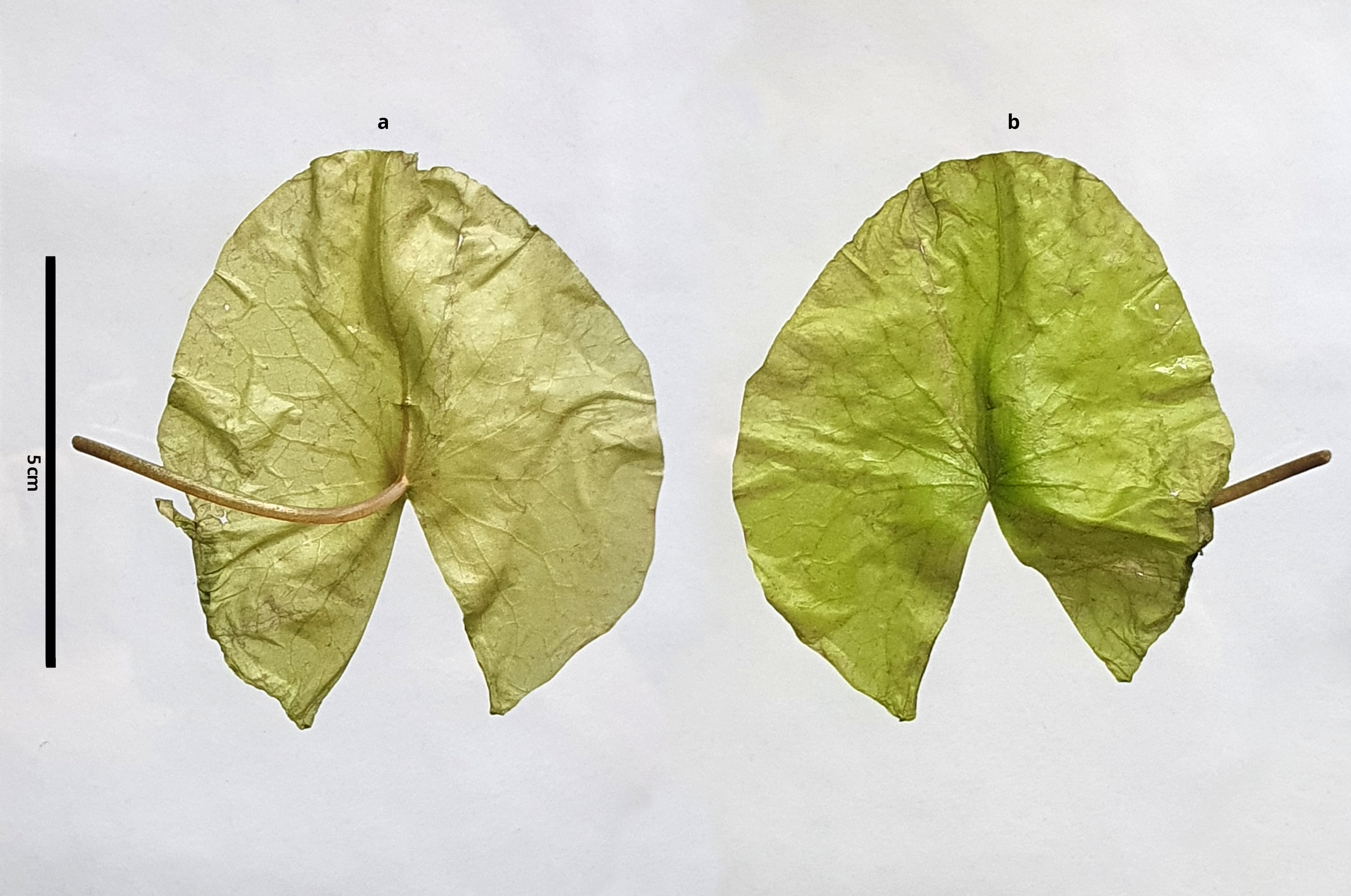
Submerged leaf with scale bar (5 cm). The abaxial leaf surface (a) is depicted on the left side of the image. The adaxial leaf surface (b) is depicted on the right side.

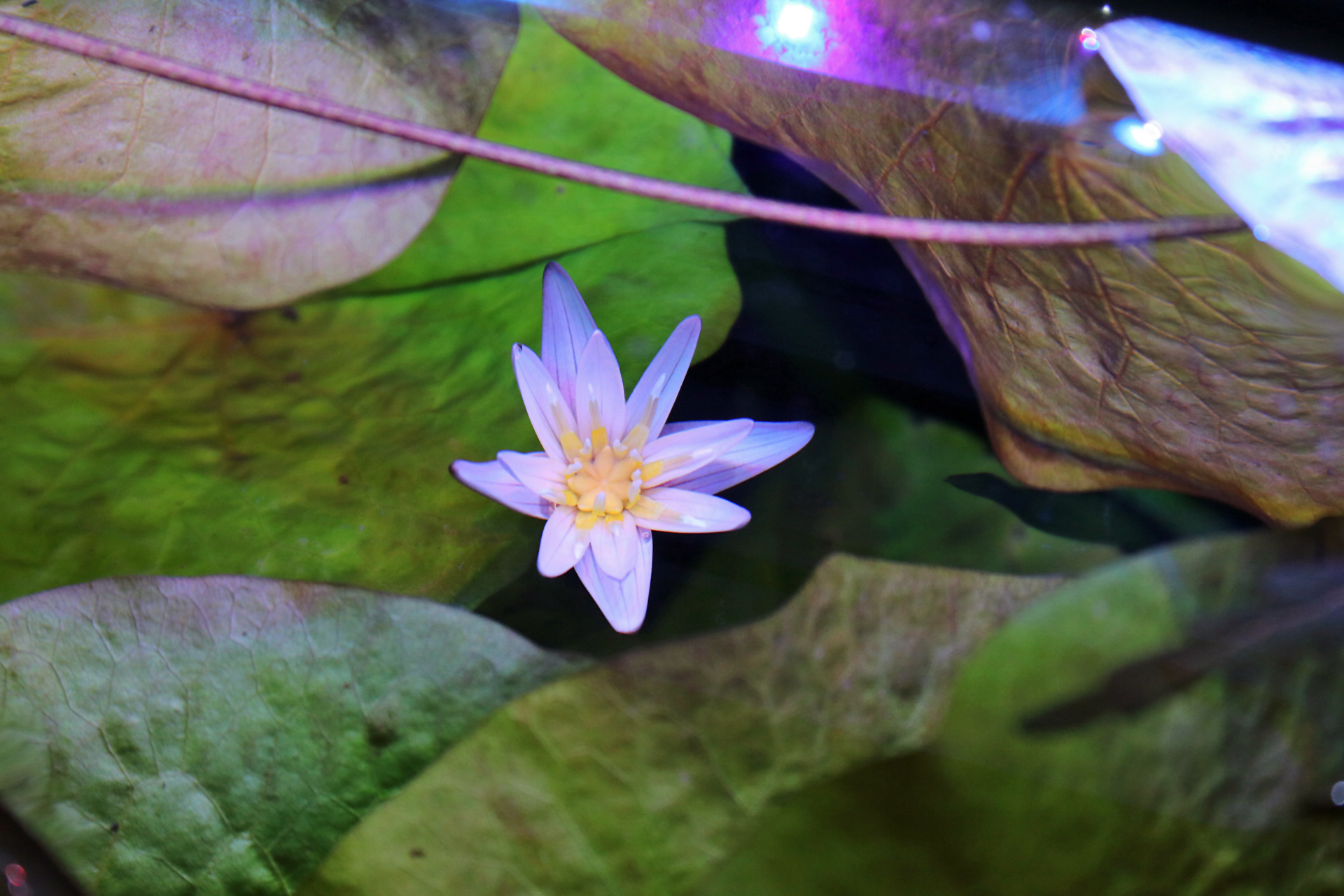
Chasmogamous flower

This species exhibits two distinctive growth forms. The submerged growth form has very thin foliage with short petioles. The emergent form has floating leaves with longer petioles.

== Genomics ==
In 2026, a telomere-to-telomere gap-free genome assembly of Nymphaea dimorpha was published. The study referred to the species by its former name, Nymphaea minuta, which is now treated as a synonym of Nymphaea dimorpha. The assembled genome spans approximately 382 Mb and is organized into 14 chromosomes. The assembly has a BUSCO completeness score of 97.2% and 21,860 protein-coding genes were predicted. The study also generated a transcriptome atlas covering 15 organs and developmental stages, providing genomic resources for the study of early-diverging flowering plants.

== Cytology ==
The chromosome count is n = 14. The genome size is 449.88 Mb.

== Reproduction ==
=== Generative reproduction ===
Cleistogamy occurs in this species. It can produce flowers, which never open, but self-fertilise and never reach the water surface.

== Habitat ==
It grows in pools of water among slowly flowing streams. The pools, which are darkened with organic material, are shaded by the canopy of tropical forest.

== Taxonomy ==
=== Taxonomic history ===
This species was first described as Nymphaea minuta K.C.Landon, R.A.Edwards & Nozaic in 2006. Later, it was discovered that this was a Nomen illegitimum, as the name was preoccupied by the French fossil waterlily Nymphaea minuta Saporta described in 1891. Therefore, the new name Nymphaea dimorpha I.M.Turner was chosen in 2014.

=== Type specimen ===
The type specimen was collected in shaded rain pools beneath coastal forest near Tampolo, Madagascar in 1999.

=== Placement within Nymphaea ===
It is a member of Nymphaea subgen. Brachyceras.

== Etymology ==
The specific epithet dimorpha references the two distinctive growth forms of this species. The prefix di- means "two", and -morph means shape.

== Cultivation ==
It is easily cultivated and suitable for low-light conditions. In cultivation it may grow four times larger than plants observed in their natural habitat. This is due to better fertilisation. It is very sensitive to cold temperatures.

It is used in hybridisation to create new smaller waterlily cultivars.
