= Albert de Lestang =

- Born: 1884; Argentina
- Died: 18 November 1959 (aged 74–75); Charters Towers, Queensland
- Citizenship: Australian
- Occupation: Botanist

Albert de Lestang (1884 – 18 November 1959) was a French-Australian botanist. From his North Queensland property, Adel's Grove, de Lestang supplied seeds and plants to botanical gardens around the world. In 1946 he supplied seeds of a rare white-flowered water lily that the botanical world had been chasing since 1852. The seeds were sent to Kew Gardens but forwarded to Texas for propagation. The lily was originally referred to as a form of Nymphaea gigantea but is currently identified as a new species N. carpentariae. The cultivar 'Albert De L'Estang' is thought to be a different species, N. immutabilis.

Born in Argentina to French-speaking parents, Albert de Lestang travelled around the world before settling in outback Queensland in the Gulf Country around 1920 taking up a freehold property in that region. Although there is no official confirmation, it is believed he was commissioned by the Queensland Government to experiment with the growing of tropical fruits and trees along Lawn Hill Creek. He used the creek for the supply of water for his project, pumping water to wells through canals near his plantings. Water also had to be transported in kerosene tins.

By 1939 he had a list of over 1000 species introduced to his property. This list was forwarded to the Government Botanists C. T. White and W. D. Francis. His gathering of seeds for identification extends from 1925 with most being collected between 1938 and 1953. Brisbane Botanic Gardens has a collection of 536 different seed species provided by de Lestang. He also provided seeds to overseas contacts including Kew Gardens in England. It appears he had good relationships with the local aborigines employing them as seed gatherers.

A small portion of his botanical oasis and some remains of his irrigation system still exist at Adel's Grove, "The Frenchman's Garden" now a tourist camping site surrounded by Lawn Hill Station. The name is made up form the initial letters of his own name. His origins are unclear. In a newspaper article in 1946 Mr. Trickett of Kew Gardens is quoted as saying De Lestang advised him that he ran away from his home in England following an argument with his father after a quarrel over a girl.

The Brisbane Courier of 8 January 1914 contains an advertisement where A. De Lestang requests a position with horse breeders and dealers advising he had 15 years experience with horses and mules throughout Spain, France and Argentina. An article in the Cairns Post of 10 October 1923 carries a letter from the geologist Edward Grey advising he is part of a private expedition under the leadership of De Lestang making a crossing of the Australian continent collecting scientific data.

He also ran a store at Adels' Grove for passing travelers.

Unfortunately sometime in the 1950s, floods and native animals damaged his trees (believed to number 2000 by then.) Soon after, while he was absent from his home, fire destroyed his dwelling, possessions, his research and further damaged his botanical collection. Disheartened, suffering the effects of old age he eventually entered Charters Towers Eventide Home for the Aged where he spent his final years. Despite his attempts to find someone to take over the garden, it eventually succumbed to neglect, becoming a miners camp.
