= Nymphaea carpentariae =

Conservation status
- Special Least Concern (NCA)

Scientific classification
- Kingdom: Plantae
- Clade: Tracheophytes
- Clade: Angiosperms
- Order: Nymphaeales
- Family: Nymphaeaceae
- Genus: Nymphaea
- Subgenus: Nymphaea subg. Anecphya
- Species: N. carpentariae

Binomial name
- Nymphaea carpentariae S.W.L.Jacobs & Hellq.
- Nymphaea carpentariae is native to Queensland and Western Australia

Species of water lily

Nymphaea carpentariae is a species of waterlily native to Queensland and Western Australia.

== Description ==
=== Vegetative characteristics ===
Nymphaea carpentariae is a perennial plant with 4 cm wide, globose to elongate rhizomes. The 45 cm wide, orbicular-elliptic leaves have dentate margins.

=== Generative characteristics ===
The fragrant flowers rise up to 40 cm above the water surface. The androecium consists of 150-300 stamens. The gynoecium consists of 7-19 carpels. The 4 cm wide, globose fruits bear spherical too elongate-sherical, 2–3.5 mm long, and 2mm wide seeds with continuous rows of 0.1-0.15 mm long trichomes.

== Cytology ==
The chromosome count is n = ~42. The genome size is 1447.44 Mb.

== Taxonomy ==
=== Publication ===
It was first described by Surrey Wilfrid Laurance Jacobs and Carl Barre Hellquist in 2006.

=== Type specimen ===
The type specimen was collected by Jacobs and Hellquist in Burketown, Queensland, Australia on the 18th of April 2005.

=== Placement within Nymphaea ===
It is placed in Nymphaea subgenus Anecphya.

== Etymology ==
The specific epithet carpentariae references the Gulf of Carpentaria, Australia.

== Conservation ==
The NCA status of Nymphaea carpentariae is Special Least Concern. According to the Western Australia Conservation status, it is a poorly-known species (P1).

== Ecology ==
=== Habitat ===
It is found in lagoons, and in billabongs.

== Cultivation ==
It has a named cultivar Nymphaea carpentariae "Julia Leu".
