= Nupharin =

Nupharin may refer to:

- Nupharine, a quinolizidine alkaloid found in Nuphar and Nymphaea species
- Nupharin A, B, C, D, E and F, ellagitannins found in Nymphaeaceae
