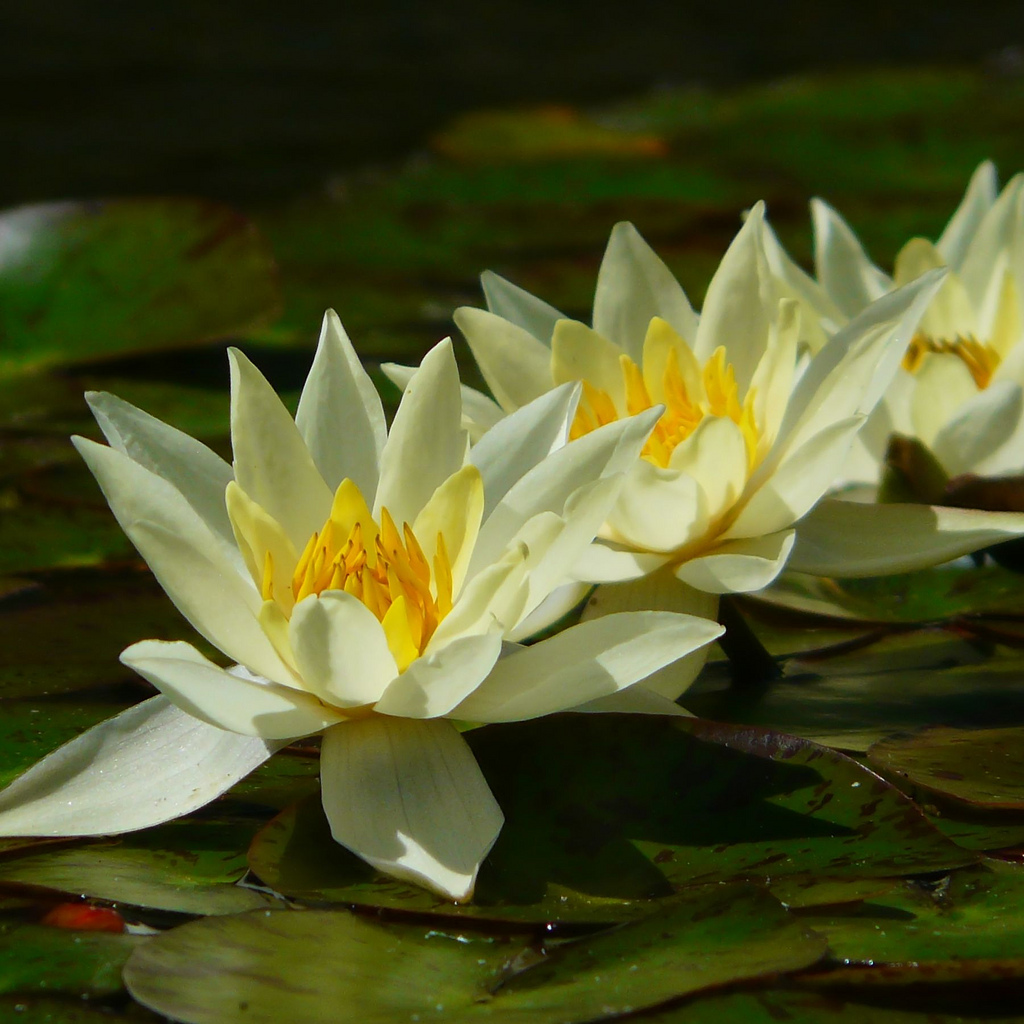

Scientific classification
- Kingdom: Plantae
- Clade: Tracheophytes
- Clade: Angiosperms
- Order: Nymphaeales
- Family: Nymphaeaceae
- Genus: Nymphaea
- Subgenus: Nymphaea subg. Nymphaea
- Species: N. × helvola

Binomial name
- Nymphaea × helvola M.Vilm.

= Nymphaea × helvola =

Water lily hybrid

Nymphaea × helvola is an artificial waterlily hybrid of Nymphaea mexicana with Nymphaea tetragona or Nymphaea pygmaea, which has been naturalised in India.

== Description ==
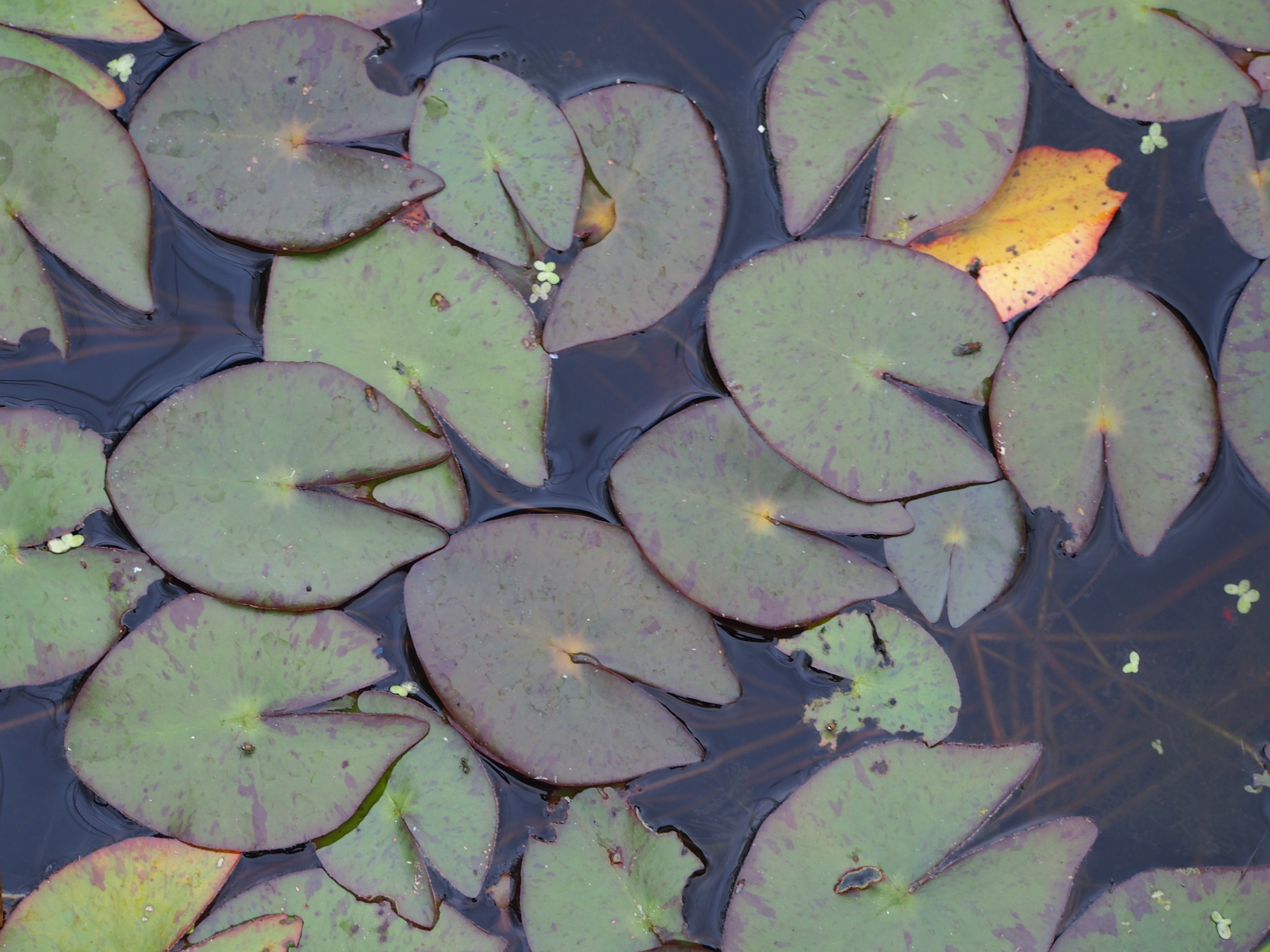
Nymphaea × helvola foliage

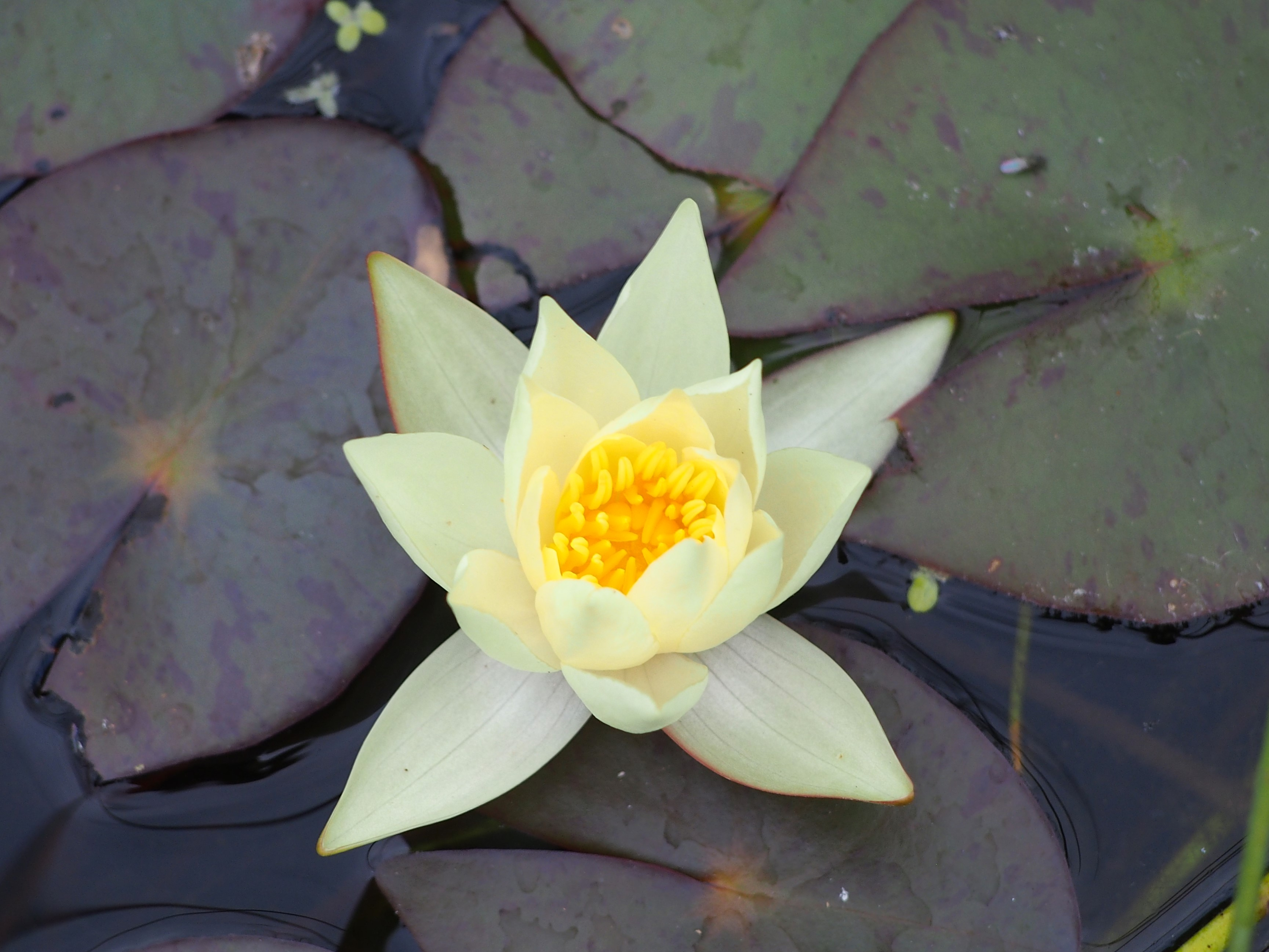
Nymphaea × helvola flower

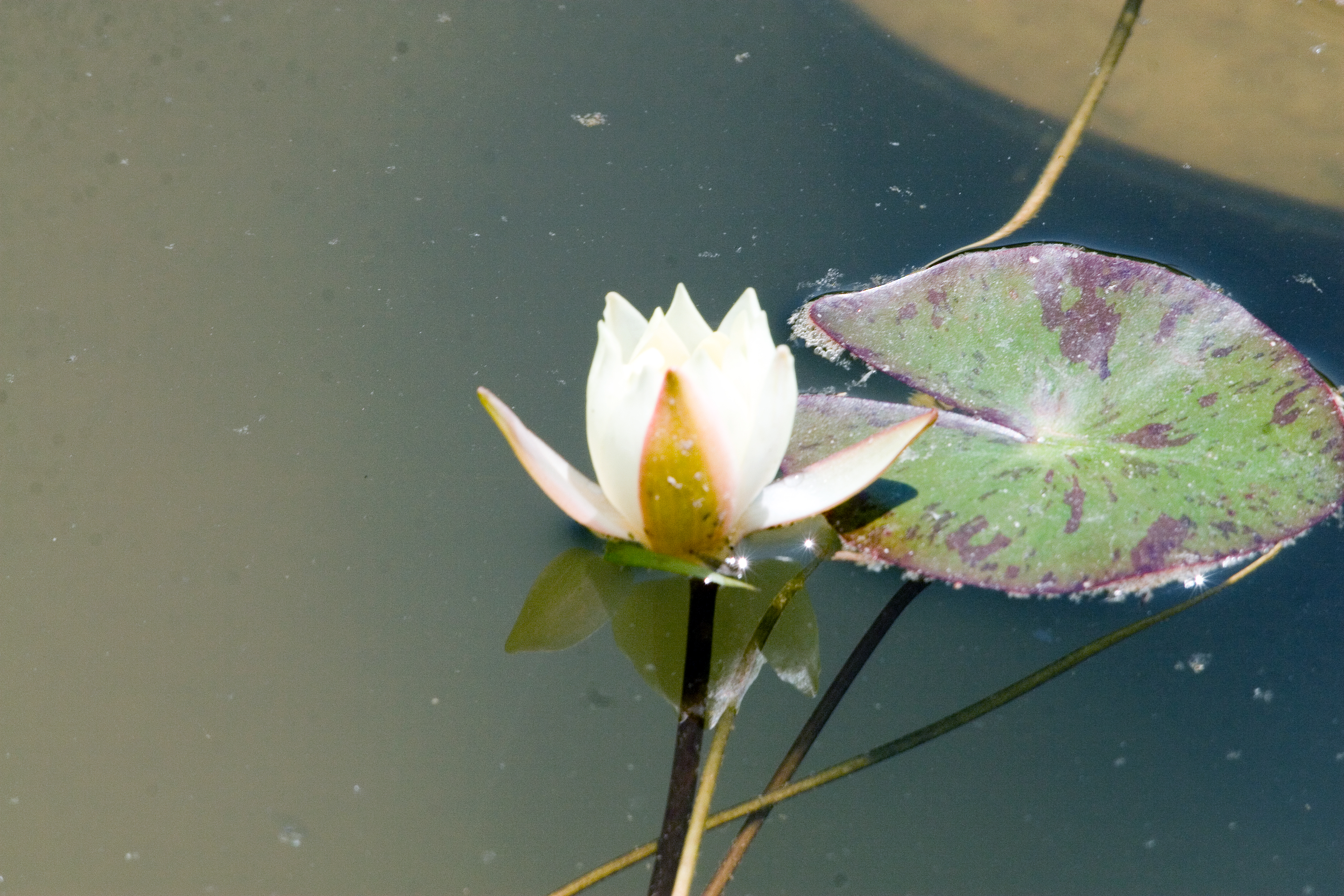
Nymphaea × helvola flower and leaf

=== Vegetative characteristics ===
Nymphaea × helvola is a rhizomatous, perennial, aquatic herb. The small, dark green, oval to orbiculate leaf with an entire margin is 5–12 cm long, and 7 cm wide. The leaf displays brown to red marbling and spotting.

=== Generative characteristics ===
The small, yellow, fragrant, 3–4 cm wide flowers float on the water surface. The sepals are green on the abaxial surface and yellow on the adaxial surface. The flowers have 16–19 lanceolate, 2 cm long, and 1 cm wide petals. The stamens are yellow.

== Taxonomy ==
It was described by Maurice de Vilmorin in 1891. It is placed in the subgenus Nymphaea subg. Nymphaea.

=== Etymology ===
The hybrid name helvola means pale yellow. The flowers are pale yellow.

=== Hybridisation ===
It is a hybrid of Nymphaea mexicana with Nymphaea tetragona or Nymphaea pygmaea.

== Distribution ==
It has been naturalised in Tam Dil, Mizoram, India.

== Cultivation ==
It is cultivated in small ponds, small water gardens, and aquaria in shallow, 20–25 cm deep water.
