= Nymphaea × sundvikii =

Scientific classification
- Kingdom: Plantae
- Clade: Tracheophytes
- Clade: Angiosperms
- Order: Nymphaeales
- Family: Nymphaeaceae
- Genus: Nymphaea
- Subgenus: Nymphaea subg. Nymphaea
- Species: N. × sundvikii

Binomial name
- Nymphaea × sundvikii Hiitonen
- Nymphaea × sundvikii is endemic to central and East European Russia

Species of water lily

Nymphaea × sundvikii is a species of waterlily endemic to Central and East European Russia. It is a natural hybrid of Nymphaea candida and Nymphaea tetragona.

== Description ==
Parent species of the natural hybrid
Nymphaea × sundvikii Hiitonen

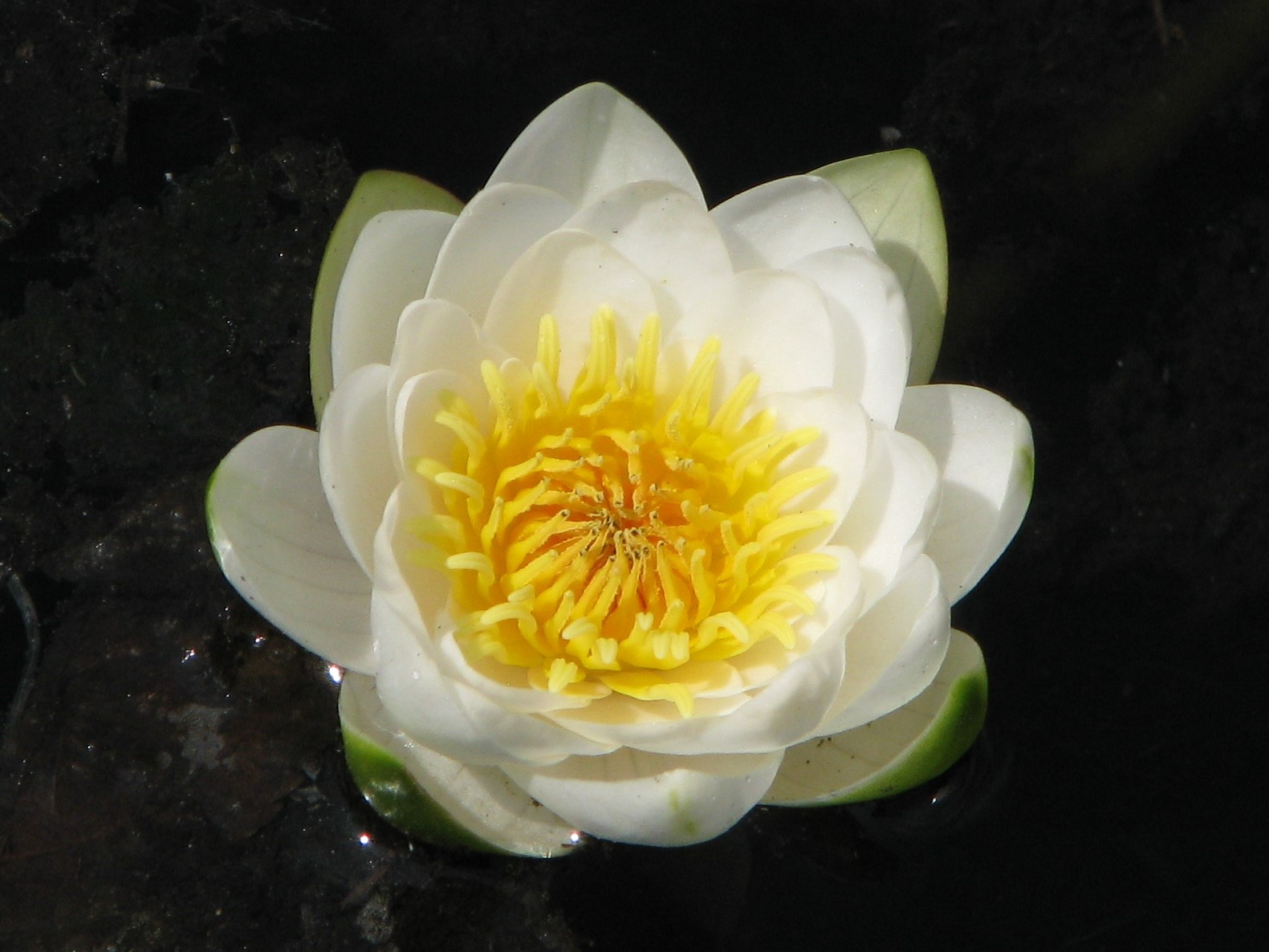
Nymphaea candida C.Presl

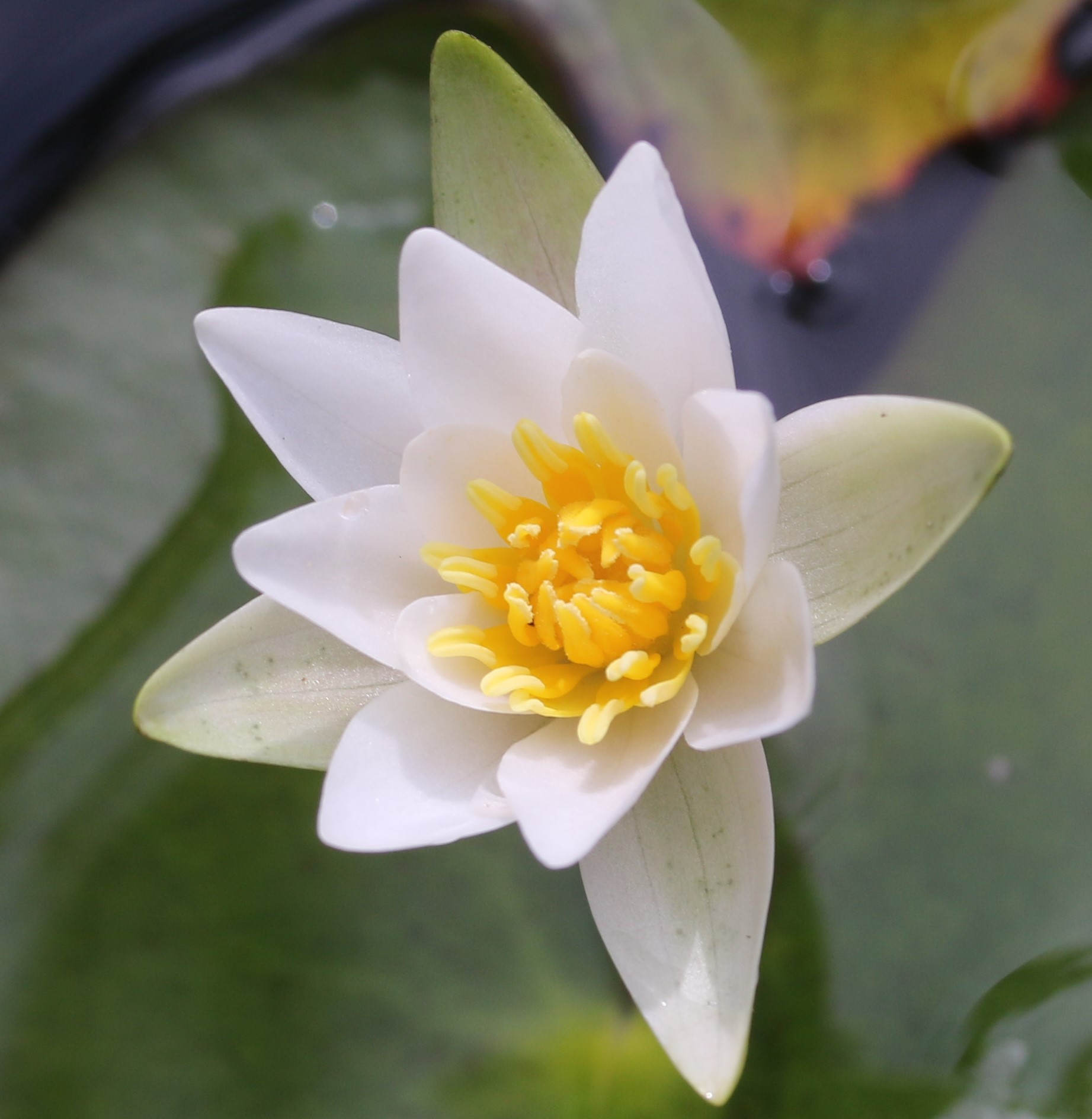
Nymphaea tetragona Georgi

=== Vegetative characteristics ===
The leaves are larger than the leaves of Nymphaea tetragona.

=== Generative characteristics ===
The flowers show intermediate morphological characteristics, and they are larger than the flowers of Nymphaea tetragona.

== Taxonomy ==
It was first described by Hiitonen in 1933.

== Ecology ==
=== Habitat ===
It is known from aquatic habitats in the region of Tver, Kostroma, and Nizhny Novgorod. It has been observed in a Sphagnum bog in a small lake. It has also been reported to occur in the Kazhim reservoir. The hybrid is usually found in habitats of sympatric occurrence of the two parent species.
