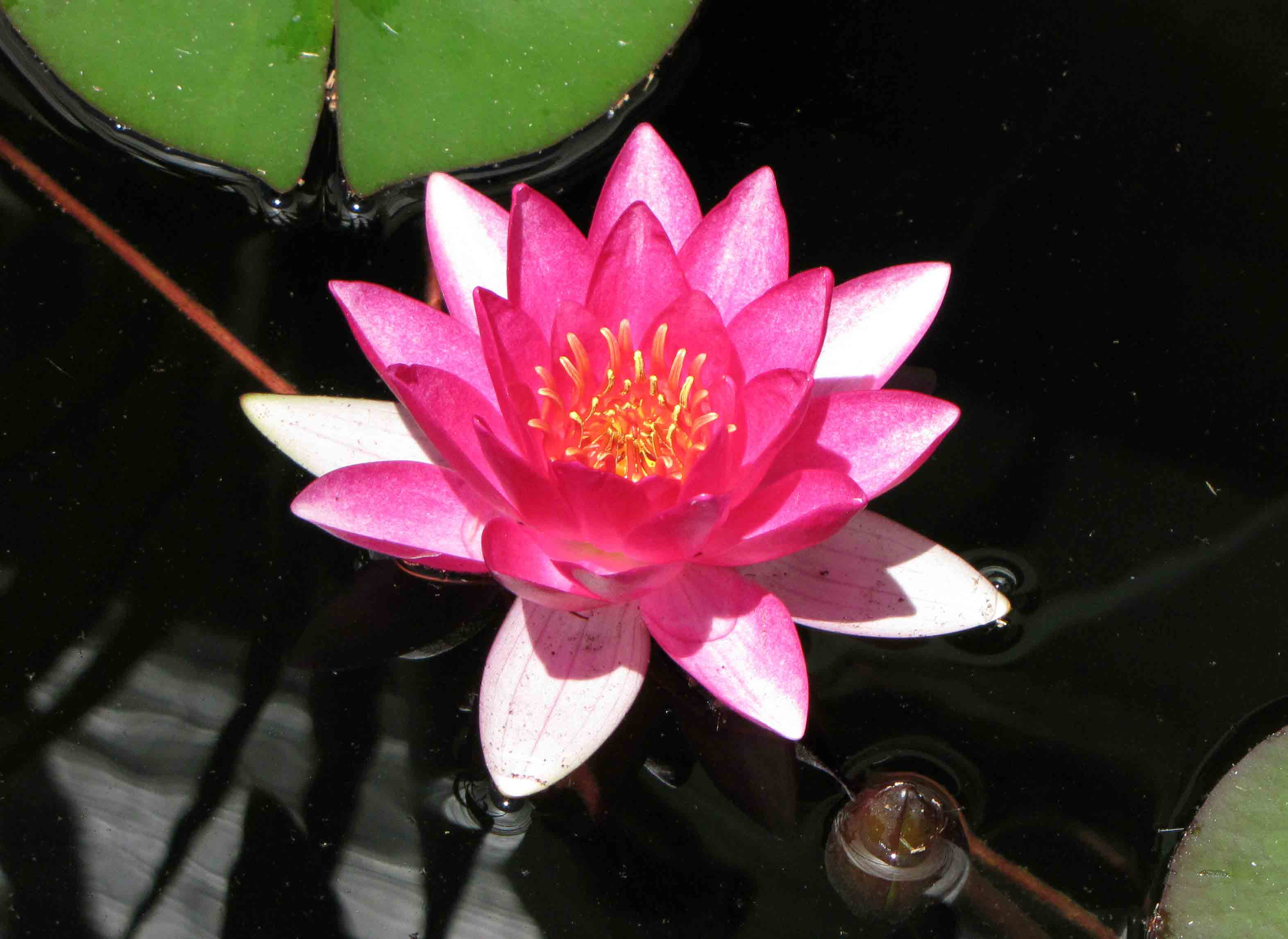

Scientific classification
- Kingdom: Plantae
- Clade: Tracheophytes
- Clade: Angiosperms
- Order: Nymphaeales
- Family: Nymphaeaceae
- Genus: Nymphaea
- Subgenus: Nymphaea subg. Nymphaea
- Species: N. × laydekeri

Binomial name
- Nymphaea × laydekeri M.Vilm.

Synonyms
- Nymphaea × lucida Lat.-Marl. ex André

= Nymphaea × laydekeri =

Water lily hybrid

Nymphaea × laydekeri is an artificial waterlily hybrid of Nymphaea alba, Nymphaea tetragona, and possibly Nymphaea mexicana, which has been naturalised in Sweden and the United Kingdom.

== Description ==
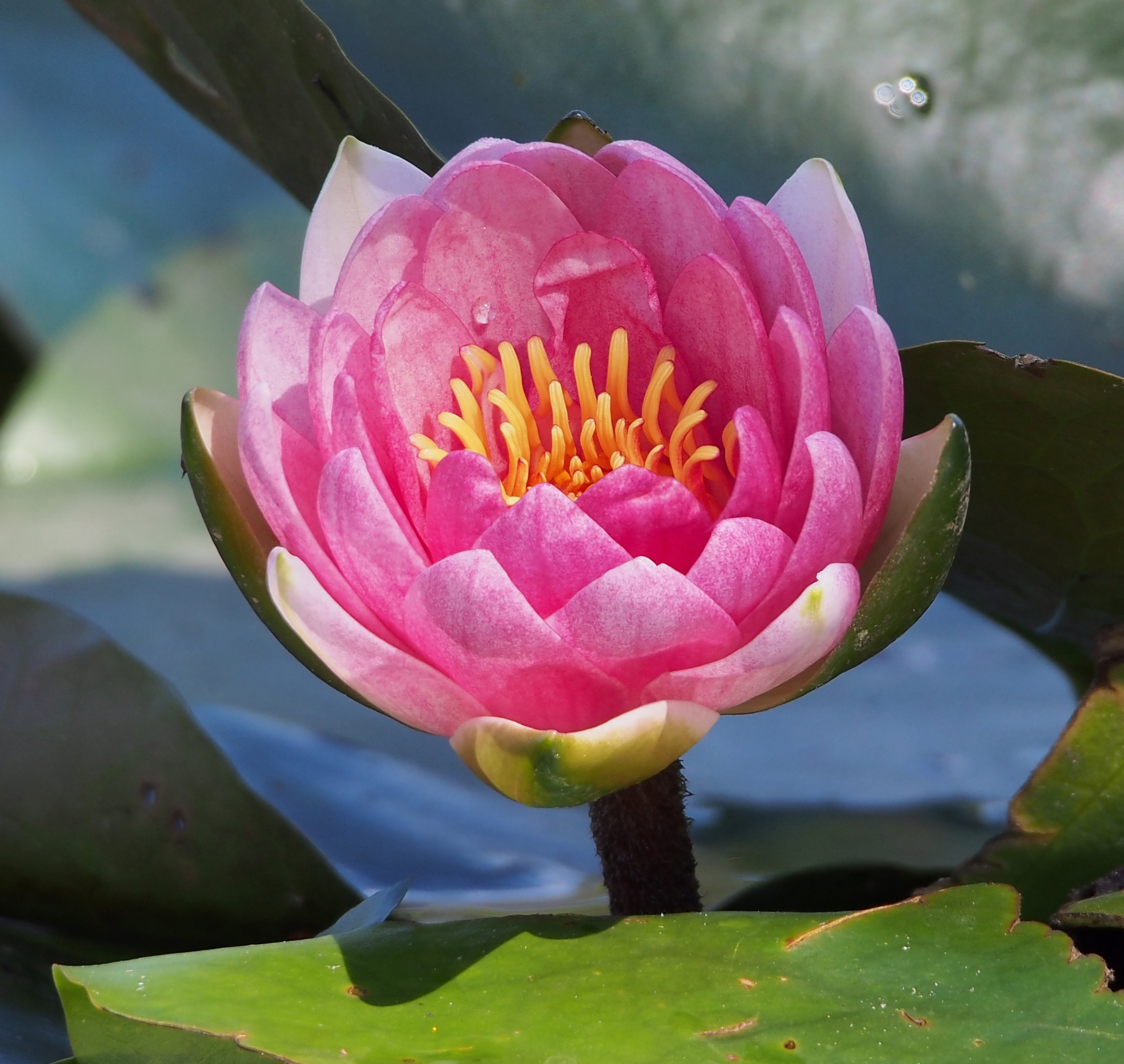

=== Vegetative characteristics ===
Nymphaea × laydekeri is an aquatic, perennial, rhizomatous herb with branched or unbranched rhizomes. Roots emerge from the rhizome at the leaf bases. The small, green, circular, 22 cm long, and 19 cm wide wide leaves are mottled with brown colouration but such colouration may be absent, as the colour may fade to green as the leaf ages.

=== Generative characteristics ===
The small, fragrant, diurnal, pink or red up to 10 cm wide flower has a square receptacle with a recession around the peduncle. The flower has 20 petals. The stamens are yellow to orange. It is sterile. Flowering occurs from June to September.

== Taxonomy ==
It was described by Maurice de Vilmorin in 1891. The taxon authority appears to be disputed. Some sources list Maurice de Vilmorin, while others list Joseph Bory Latour-Marliac, or Édouard-François André as the taxon author. In the latter case, the name is published by André but attributed to previous work by Latour-Marliac.

=== Etymology ===
The hybrid name laydekeri refers to Maurice Laydeker, the son in law of Joseph Bory Latour-Marliac.

=== Hybridisation ===
It is a hybrid of Nymphaea alba, Nymphaea tetragona and possibly Nymphaea mexicana.

== Distribution ==
It has been naturalised in Sweden and the United Kingdom. In the UK, it has been widely introduced to old gravel pits, reservoirs, ornamental ponds, and lakes.

== Cultivation ==
It is cultivated in small ponds, in very shallow, or in deep water. It is susceptible to Phytophthora rot.
