= Parika Nature Reserve =

Protected area in Estonia

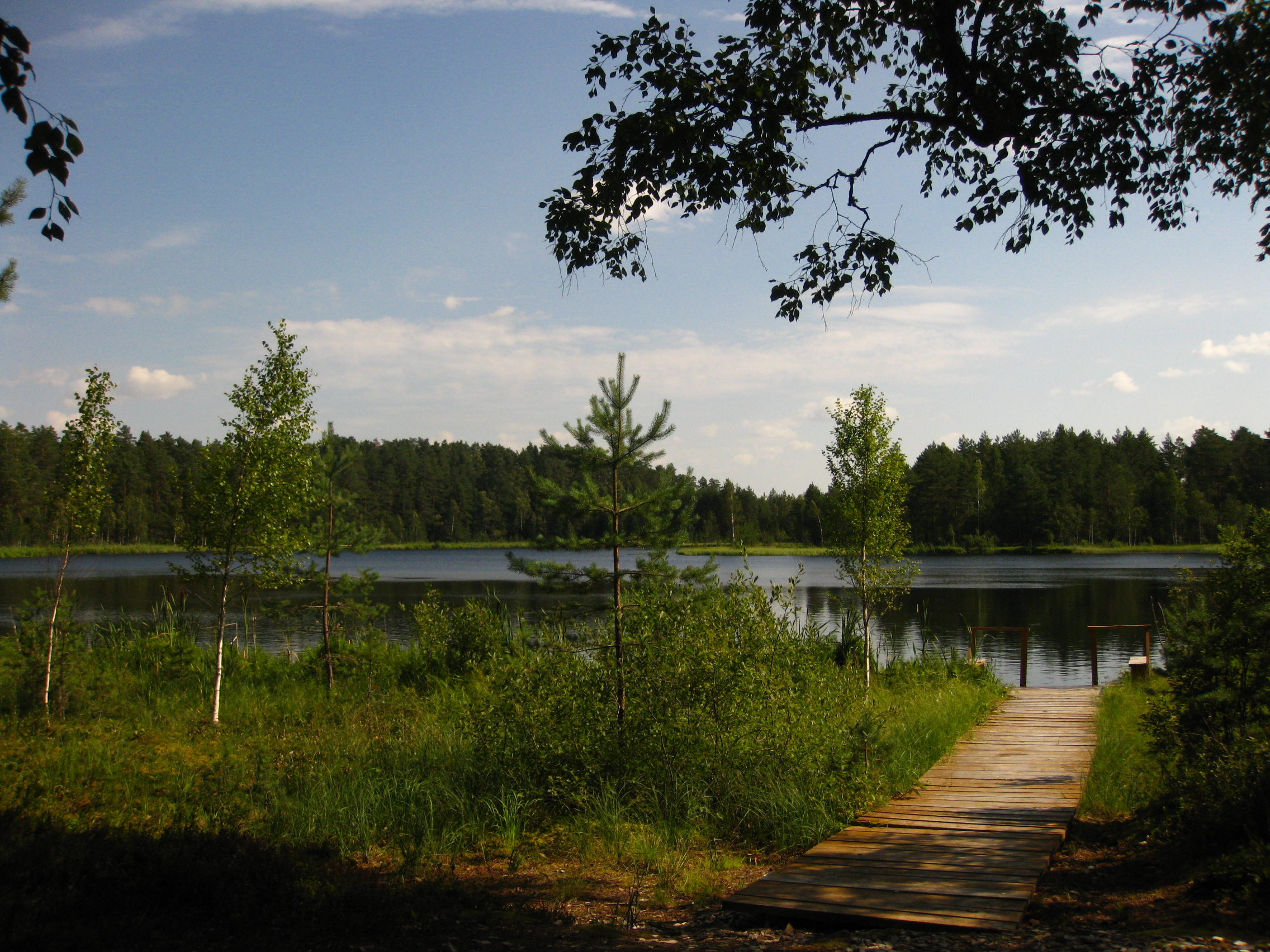

- Location within Estonia
- Location: Estonia
- Nearest city: Viljandi
- Coordinates: 58°29′43″N 25°46′23″E
- Area: 2,182 ha (5,390 acres)
- Established: 1981

Parika Nature Reserve (Estonian: Parika looduskaitseala) is a nature reserve in Viljandi County in southern Estonia.

The nature reserve is situated in and around Parika bog, and consists of a system of bogs and small lakes. It is an important habitat for several species of orchid, including coralroot orchid, common spotted orchid and common twayblade, but also other e.g. Nymphaea candida. The bird-life of the nature reserve is also rich; species commonly found here include the lesser spotted eagle, black stork and grey heron. Two trails for visitors have been prepared in the nature reserve.
