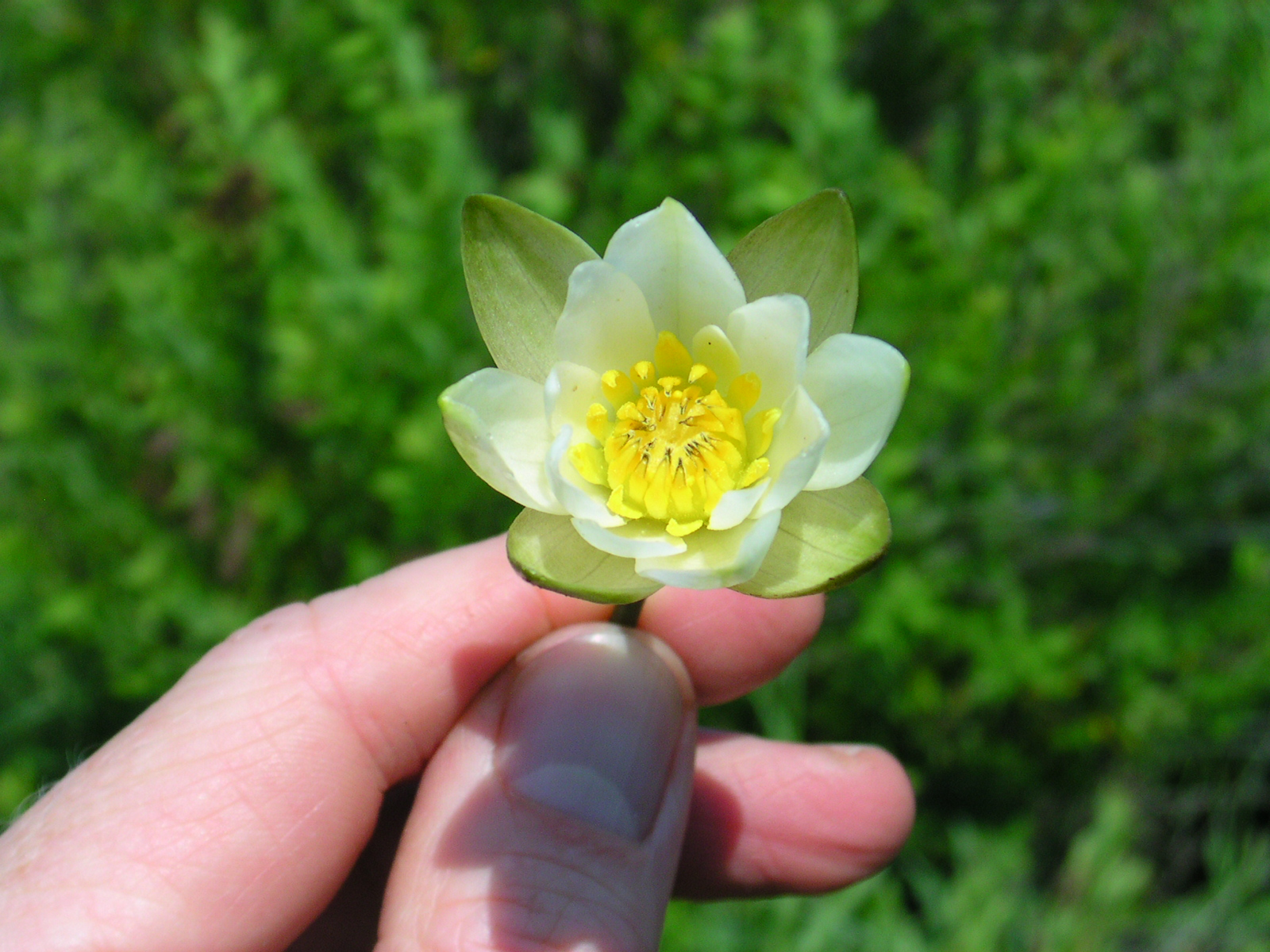

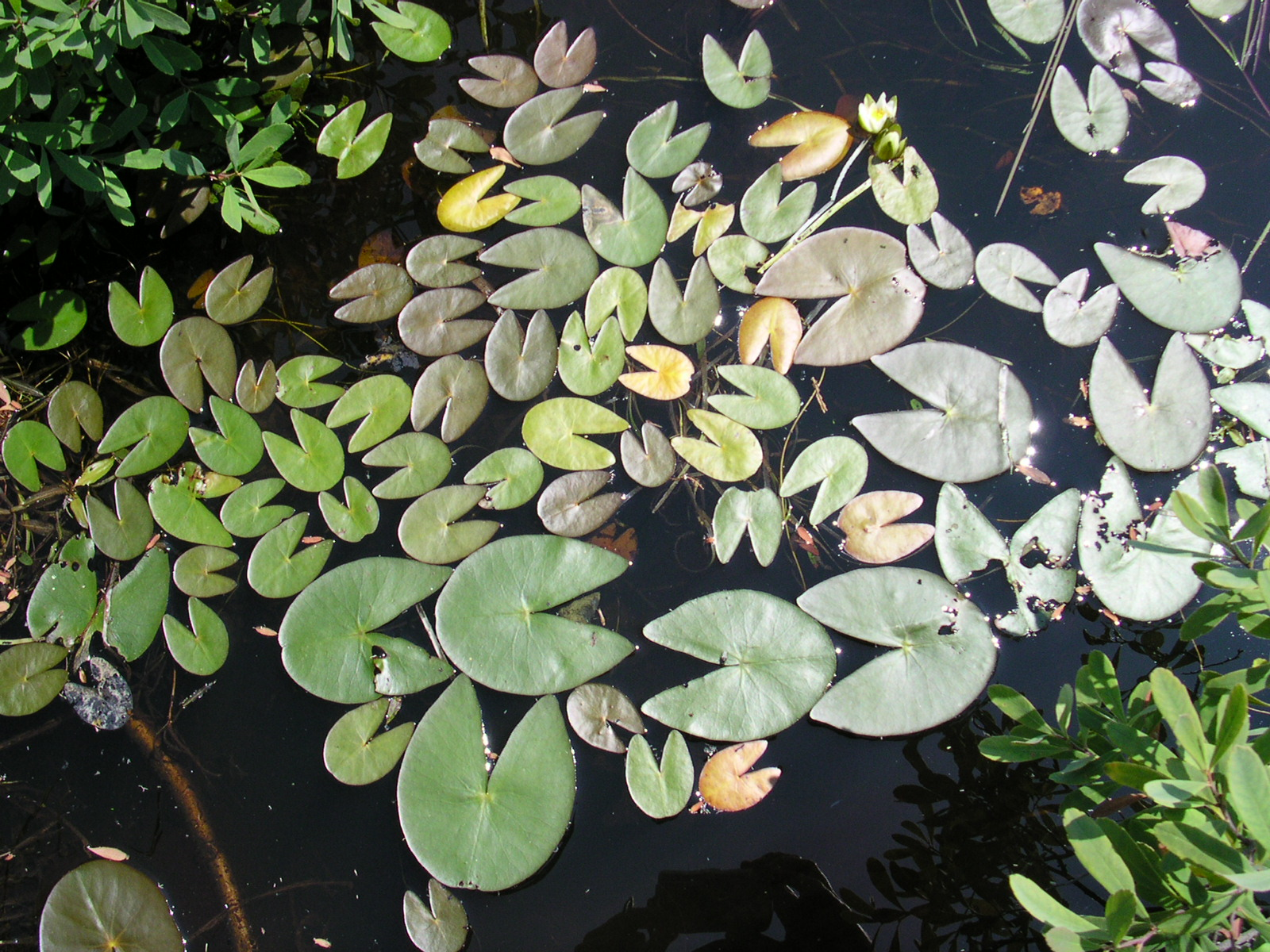

Conservation status
- Least Concern (IUCN 3.1)

- Secure (NatureServe)

Scientific classification
- Kingdom: Plantae
- Clade: Tracheophytes
- Clade: Angiosperms
- Order: Nymphaeales
- Family: Nymphaeaceae
- Genus: Nymphaea
- Subgenus: Nymphaea subg. Nymphaea
- Section: Nymphaea sect. Chamaenymphaea
- Species: N. leibergii

Binomial name
- Nymphaea leibergii (Morong) Rydb.
- It is native to Canada and Northern USA

Synonyms
- Castalia leibergii Morong; Castalia tetragona var. leibergii (Morong) J.Schust.; Nymphaea tetragona var. leibergii (Morong) B.Boivin; Nymphaea tetragona subsp. leibergii (Morong) A.E.Porsild

= Nymphaea leibergii =

Species of water lily

Nymphaea leibergii, also known as the dwarf waterlily and Leiberg's waterlily, is a perennial emergent aquatic plant belonging to the genus Nymphaea. It can be found across northern North America in ponds and slow moving streams. Populations of this plant are infrequent throughout its range, and it is protected as a state threatened plant in Maine, Michigan, and Minnesota.

== Description ==
This plant is rooted at unbranched rhizomes which give rise to long smooth petioles which terminate in smooth ovate floating leaves. Leaves can be up to 15–19 cm, and have 7-13 radiating veins. The floating flowers are generally typical of waterlilies. They are radially symmetric with prominent yellow stamens and many white petals. The flowers open each day and close again each night.

== Taxonomy ==
=== Publication ===
It was first described as Castalia leibergii Morong by Thomas Morong in 1888. Later, it was included in the genus Nymphaea L. published as Nymphaea leibergii (Morong) Rydb. by Per Axel Rydberg in 1932.

=== Natural hybridisation ===
It is similar to Nymphaea odorata but much smaller. This species has been found to hybridize with Nymphaea odorata resulting in a sterile hybrid of intermediate morphology.

=== Position within Nymphaea ===
Nymphaea leibergii is also closely related Nymphaea tetragona, these two species of "small" waterlilies where once thought to be the same species. Today they are recognized as a distinct but form section Chamaenyphaea of the subgenera Nymphaea. N. leibergii has an overlapping range with the circumboreal N. tetragona. However, the former is more common in the central and eastern parts of northern North America, while the latter is more common in the northwestern and western sections. There are differences between the species in both the floral and vegetative parts. In the flower receptacle, where the base is elliptic in N. leibergii, the base has angular protrusions and appears tetragonal in N. tetragona. N. leibergii also has fewer petals and stamens, and a yellowish-brown stigma, where the stigma is purple in N. tetragona.

== Etymology ==
The specific epithet leibergii honours the Swedish-American botanist, forester, and plant collector John Bernhard Leiberg (1853-1913), who discovered the plant in the late 1800s.

== Ecology ==
=== Habitat ===
Its habitats include ponds, shallow lakes, slow-moving streams, and edges of slow, open water channels through marshes, up to a depth of approximately 2 m (6.6 ft).
