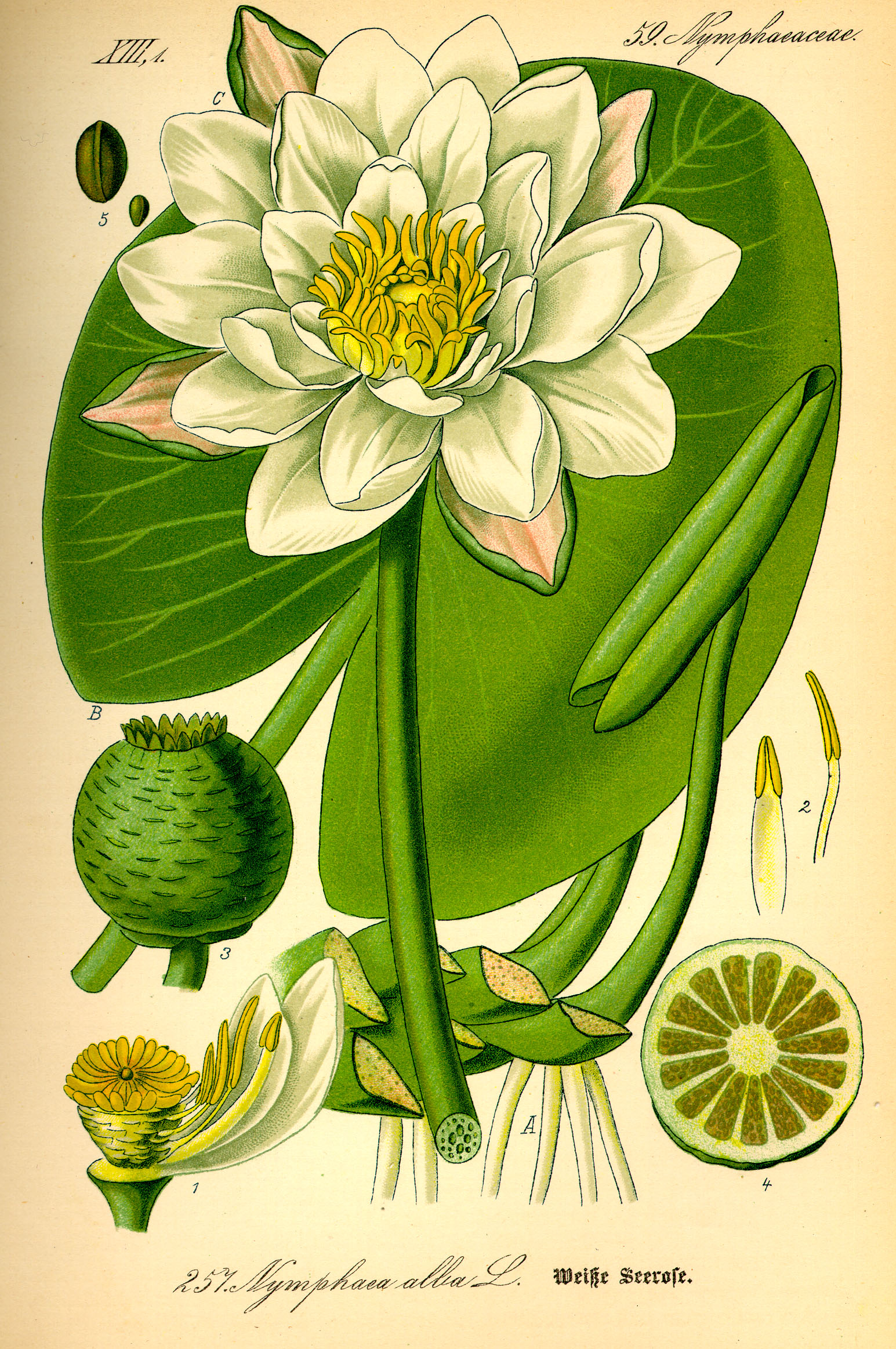
- Botanical illustration of Nymphaea alba

Scientific classification
- Kingdom: Plantae
- Clade: Tracheophytes
- Clade: Angiosperms
- Order: Nymphaeales
- Family: Nymphaeaceae
- Genus: Nymphaea
- Subgenus: Nymphaea subg. Nymphaea

Type species
- Nymphaea alba L.

Sections
- Nymphaea sect. Nymphaea; Nymphaea sect. Xanthantha

Synonyms
- Nymphaea subg. Castalia

= Nymphaea subg. Nymphaea =

Subgenus of flowering plants

Nymphaea subg. Nymphaea is a subgenus of the genus Nymphaea.

== Description ==
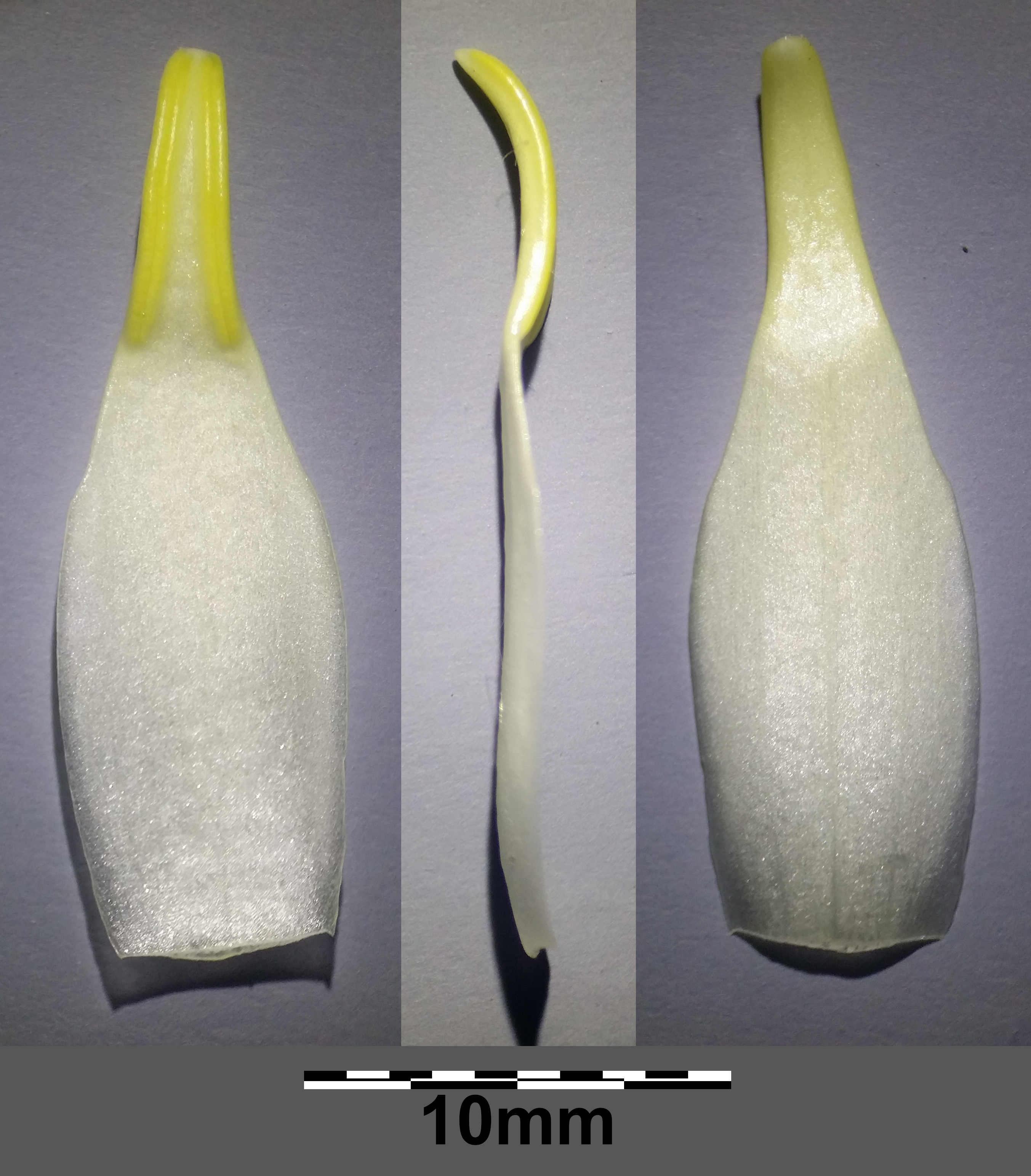
Outer stamen of Nymphaea alba without an apical sterile appendage

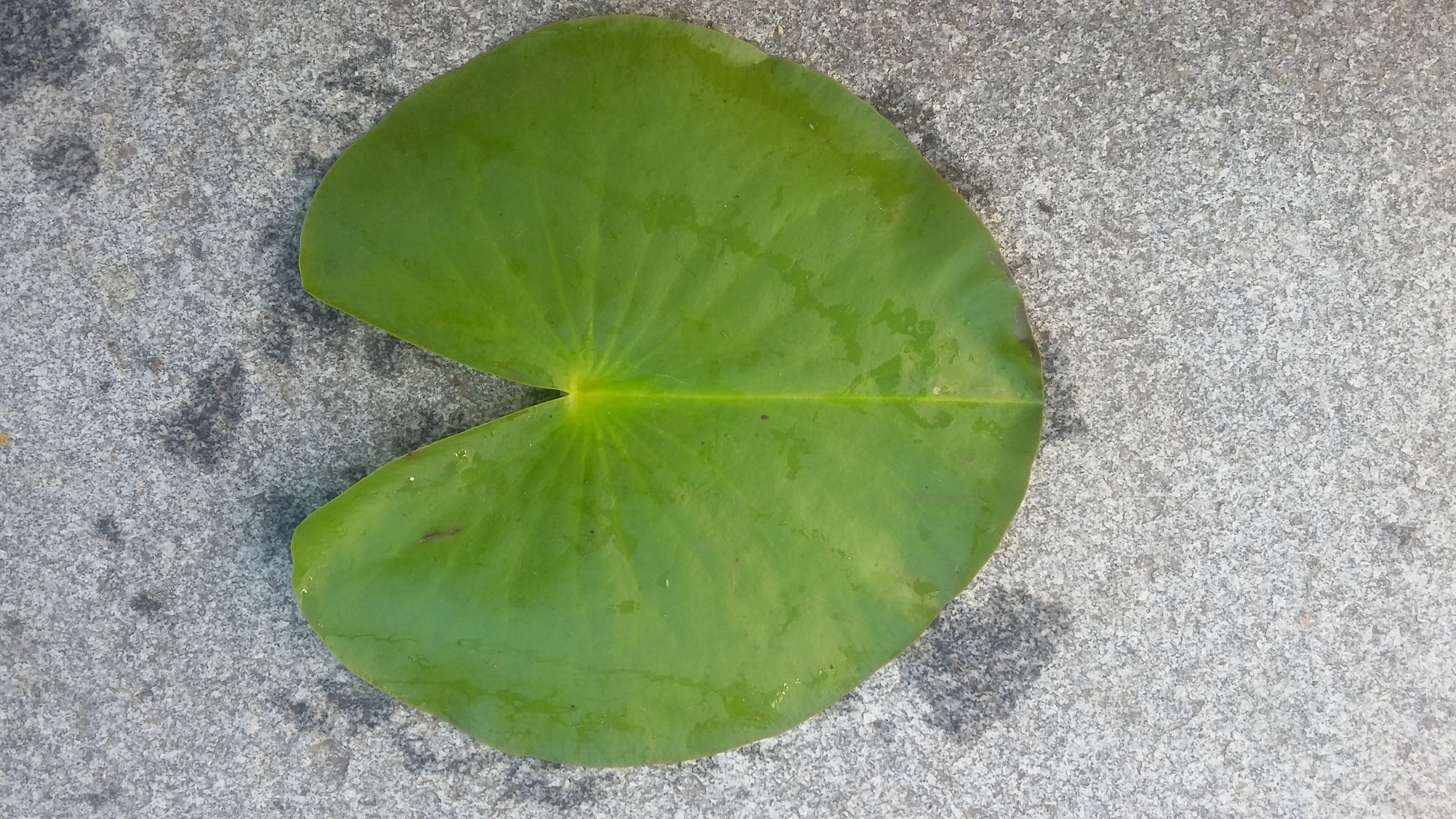
Adaxial leaf surface of Nymphaea odorata subsp. tuberosa
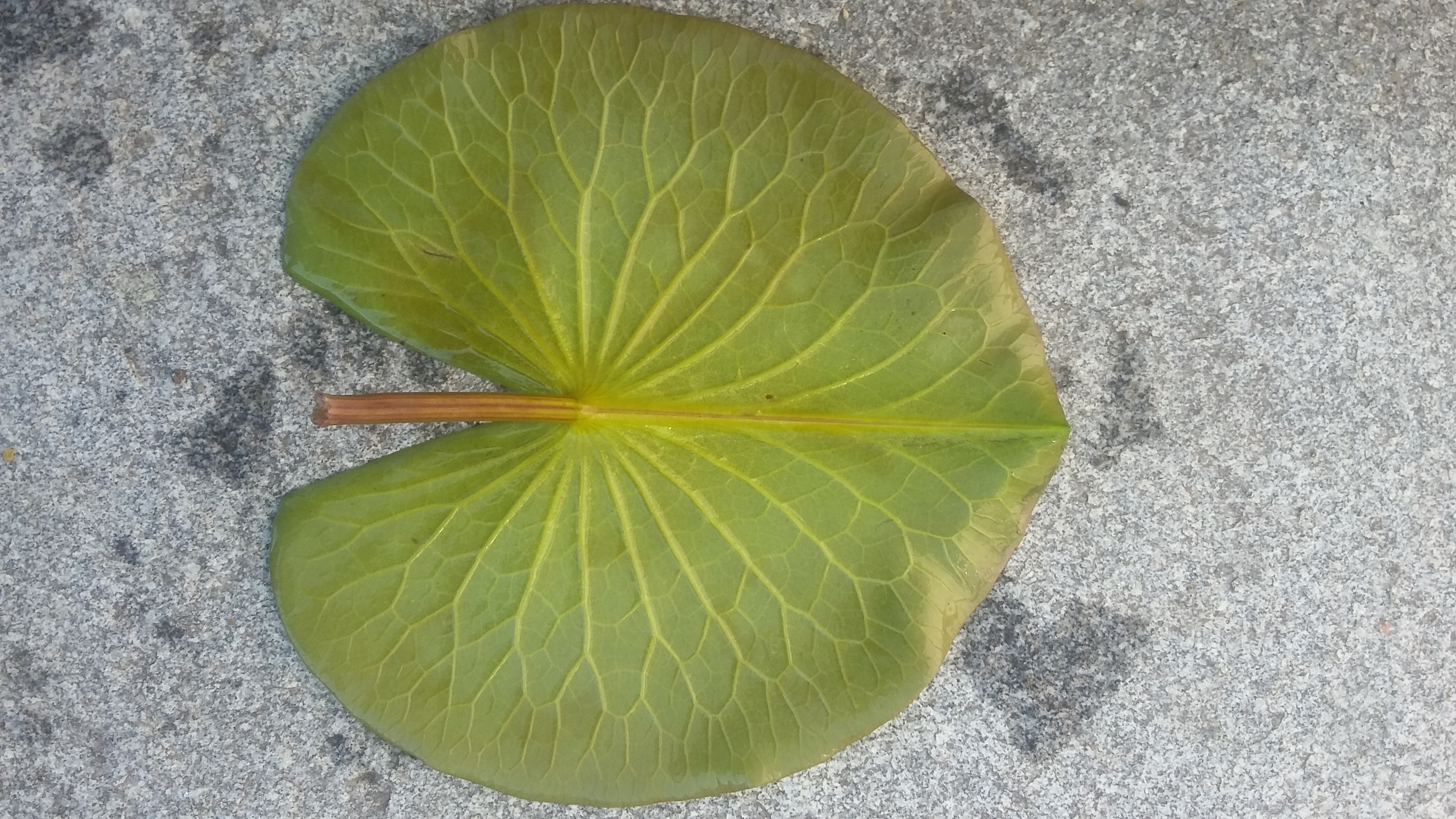
Abaxial leaf surface of Nymphaea odorata subsp. tuberosa

=== Vegetative characteristics ===
Species of Nymphaea subg. Nymphaea have horizontal or vertical rhizomes. The leaf margins are entire, sinuate or crenate, but never dentate.

=== Generative characteristics ===
The diurnal flowers float on the water surface. The outer stamens have petaloid filaments. The stamens do not have a sterile appendage at the apex. The carpellary styles are ligulate. The petals are predominantly white, but pink, red, and yellow colouration occurs as well. The large seeds have a smooth surface.

== Taxonomy ==
The subgenus Nymphaea subg. Nymphaea is an autonym. The type species is Nymphaea alba L.

=== Sections ===
It is divided into three sections:

- Nymphaea sect. Chamaenymphaea (Planch.) Wiersema
- Nymphaea sect. Nymphaea (autonym)
- Nymphaea sect. Xanthantha (Casp.) Wiersema

=== Species ===
- Nymphaea alba L.
- Nymphaea alba subsp. occidentalis (Ostenf.) Hyl.
- Nymphaea × borealis E.G.Camus
- Nymphaea candida C.Presl
- Nymphaea × helvola M.Vilm.
- Nymphaea × khurooi Sardesai & Nandikar
- Nymphaea × laydekeri M.Vilm.
- Nymphaea leibergii (Morong) Rydb.
- Nymphaea loriana Wiersema, Hellq. & Borsch
- Nymphaea × marliacea Lat.-Marl.
- Nymphaea mexicana Zucc.
- Nymphaea odorata Aiton
- Nymphaea pygmaea (Salisb.) W.T. Aiton
- Nymphaea × sundvikii Hiitonen
- Nymphaea tetragona Georgi
- Nymphaea × thiona D.B.Ward

== Distribution ==
Nymphaea subg. Nymphaea occurs in the temperate regions of the Northern Hemisphere.
