= Nymphaea loriana =

Conservation status
- Endangered (IUCN 3.1)

- Critically Imperiled (NatureServe)

Scientific classification
- Kingdom: Plantae
- Clade: Tracheophytes
- Clade: Angiosperms
- Order: Nymphaeales
- Family: Nymphaeaceae
- Genus: Nymphaea
- Subgenus: Nymphaea subg. Nymphaea
- Species: N. loriana

Binomial name
- Nymphaea loriana Wiersema, Hellq. & Borsch
- Nymphaea loriana is endemic to Manitoba, and Saskatchewan, Canada

Species of water lily

Nymphaea loriana is a species of waterlily endemic to Manitoba, and Saskatchewan, Canada.

== Description ==
=== Vegetative characteristics ===
Nymphaea loriana has branching, 2 cm wide rhizomes. The membranous submerged leaves are 8-10 cm long, and 8-12 cm wide. The suborbicular to ovate-elliptic, 10–21 cm long, and 8-18 cm wide floating leaves have a papery texture. The adaxial leaf surface is green, and the abaxial leaf surface is bright green with occasional purple colouration.

=== Generative characteristics ===
The 7.5–10 cm wide flowers have four sepals, and 12–21 petals. The androecium consists of 33–48 yellow stamens. The gynoecium consists of 8–11 carpels. The 2-2.5 cm wide fruits with coiled peduncles bear 3.5-4 mm long, 2.5-3 mm wide, arillate, greenish-brown, ovoid, smooth seeds.

== Reproduction ==
=== Generative reproduction ===
Despite being of hybrid origin, Nymphaea loriana is fertile.

== Taxonomy ==
=== Publication ===
It was first described by John Harry Wiersema, Carl Barre Hellquist, and Thomas Borsch in 2014.

=== Type specimen ===
The type specimen was collected by John Harry Wiersema, Carl Barre Hellquist, and Thomas Borsch in Egg Lake, south of Cumberland House, Saskatchewan, Canada on the 18th of August 2000.

=== Placement within Nymphaea ===
It is placed in Nymphaea subgenus Nymphaea.

=== Natural hybridisation ===
Nymphaea loriana is of hybrid origin.

== Etymology ==
The specific epithet loriana refers to Lori Wittlake Wiersema (1958–2013), the wife of John Harry Wiersema.

== Conservation ==
The IUCN conservation status is endangered (EN). The NatureServe conservation status is Critically Imperiled (G1).

== Ecology ==
=== Habitat ===
Nymphaea loriana is found in lakes, ponds, marshes, or streams with clear, stagnant, or gently flowing water at depths of 1.5–2 meters. It requires clear water.
