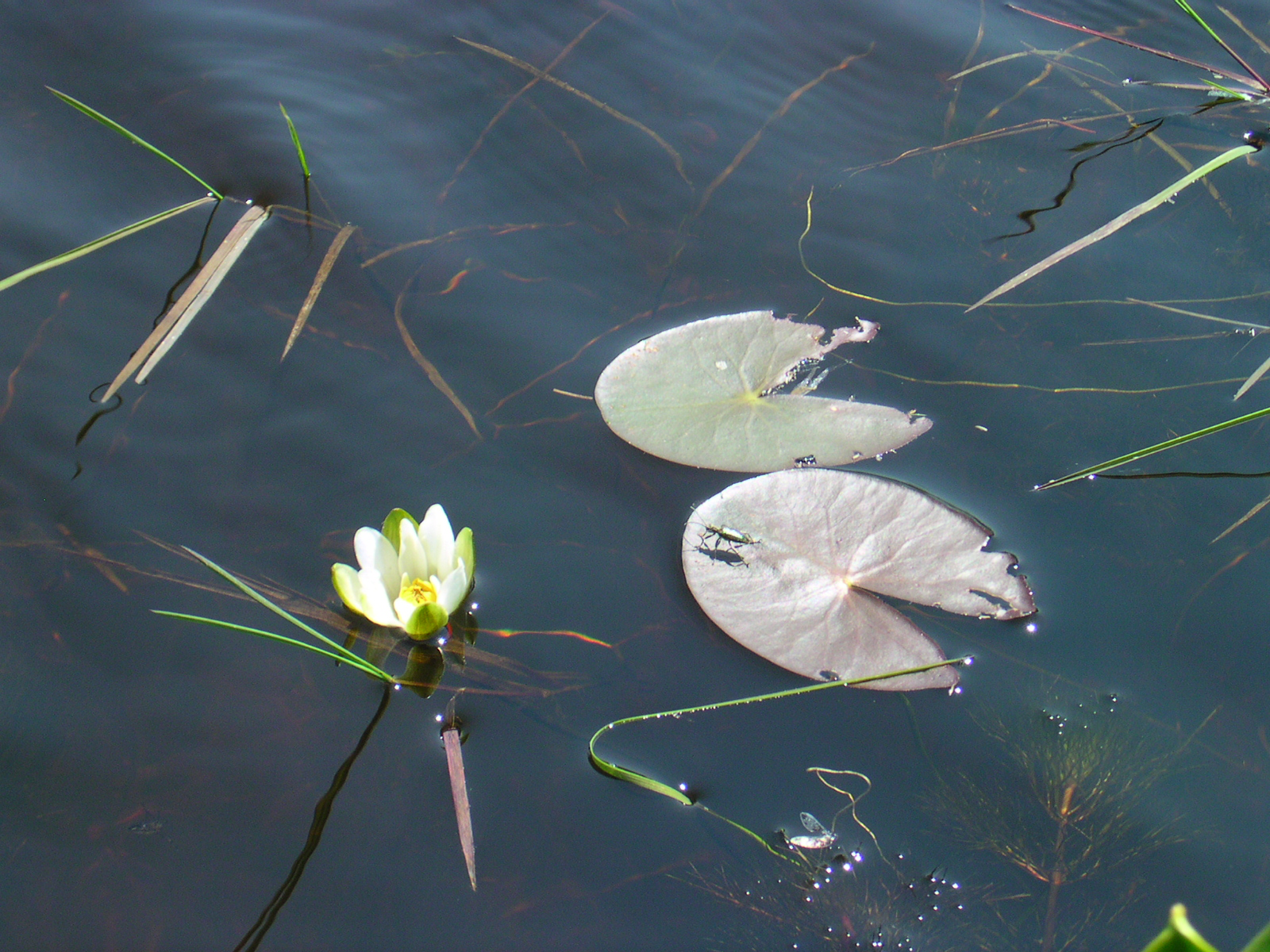
- Nymphaea leibergii in its natural habitat

Scientific classification
- Kingdom: Plantae
- Clade: Embryophytes
- Clade: Tracheophytes
- Clade: Angiosperms
- Order: Nymphaeales
- Family: Nymphaeaceae
- Genus: Nymphaea
- Subgenus: Nymphaea subg. Nymphaea
- Section: Nymphaea sect. Chamaenymphaea (Planch.) Wiersema

Type species
- Nymphaea pygmaea (Salisb.) W.T.Aiton

Species
- See here.

= Nymphaea sect. Chamaenymphaea =

Section of flowering plants

Nymphaea sect. Chamaenymphaea is a section within the subgenus Nymphaea subg. Nymphaea of the genus Nymphaea native to North America, Asia, and Europe.

== Description ==
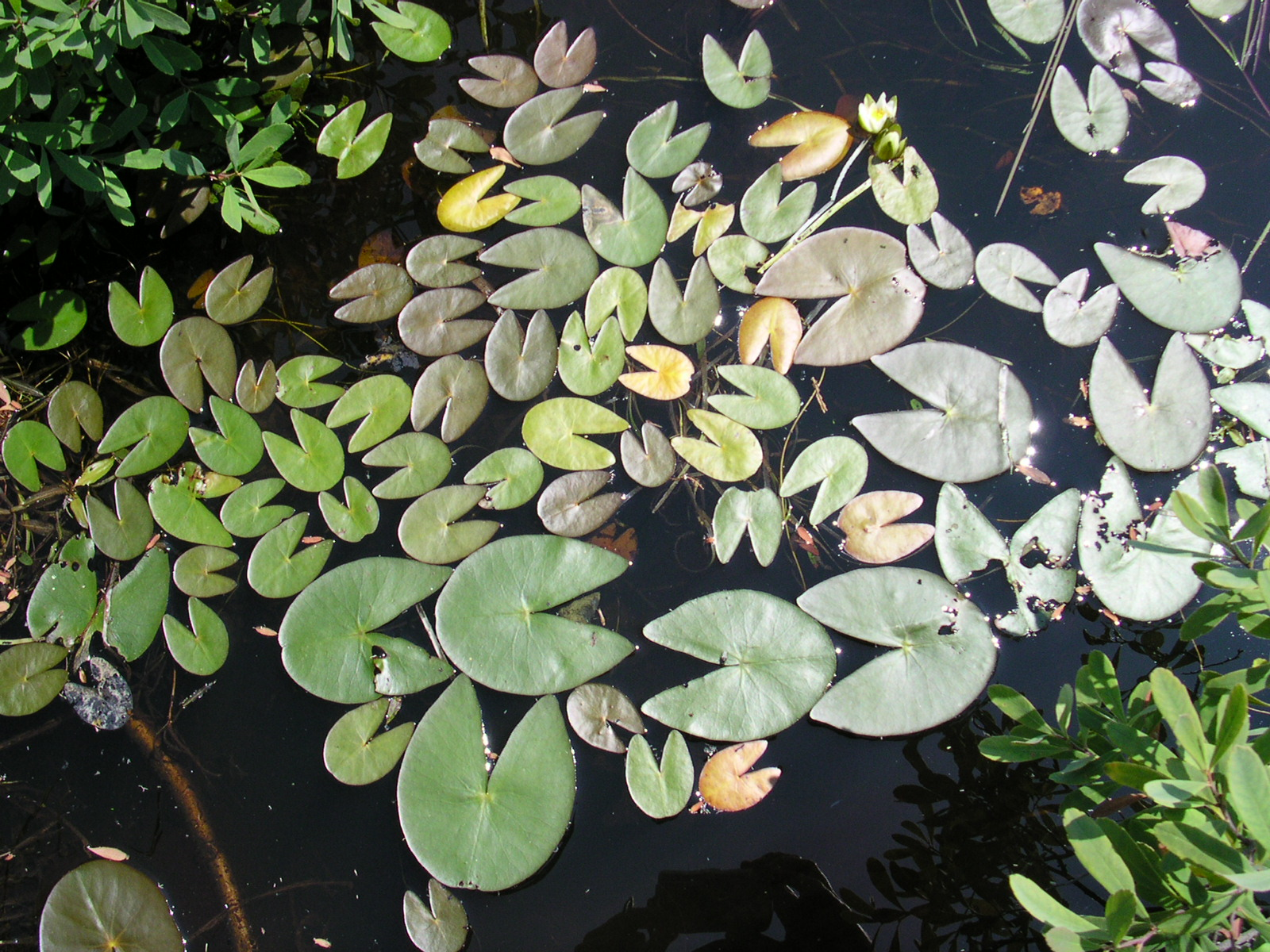
Nymphaea leibergii floating leaves

=== Vegetative characteristics ===
Its species have small, erect, cylindric, unbranched rhizomes lacking stolons. Both floating and submerged leaves are produced. The obovate to oval, glabrous, petiolate leaves with an entire margin have glabrous petioles with two primary air canals.

=== Generative characteristics ===
The small, 3–7.5 cm wide, white or rosy, flowers have peduncles with 4 primary air canals. The sepals are green. The 8–17 petals are white. The filaments are widest above the middle of the filament. The gynoecium consists of 5–12 carpels. The fruit bears smooth, ovoid, 2–3 mm long, and 1.5–2 mm wide seeds.

== Taxonomy ==
It was first published as Nymphaea subsect. Chamaenymphaea Planch. by Jules Émile Planchon in 1853. It was then given a new status as Nymphaea sect. Chamaenymphaea (Planch.) Wiersema published by John Harry Wiersema in 1997. It is placed in the subgenus Nymphaea subg. Nymphaea.

=== Species ===
- Nymphaea leibergii (Morong) Rydb.
- Nymphaea pygmaea (Salisb.) W.T.Aiton
- Nymphaea tetragona Georgi

== Distribution ==
It occurs in North America, Asia, and Europe.

== Fossil record ==
The fossil species †Nymphaea minuta Saporta has been described as being very similar to Nymphaea pygmaea and Nymphaea tetragona. It was speculated that it may represent an ancestral species of Nymphaea pygmaea.
