= Nymphaea × khurooi =

Scientific classification
- Kingdom: Plantae
- Clade: Tracheophytes
- Clade: Angiosperms
- Order: Nymphaeales
- Family: Nymphaeaceae
- Genus: Nymphaea
- Subgenus: Nymphaea subg. Nymphaea
- Species: N. × khurooi

Binomial name
- Nymphaea × khurooi Sardesai & Nandikar

Water lily hybrid

Nymphaea × khurooi is an artificial hybrid of Nymphaea alba and Nymphaea odorata, which has been naturalised in India.

== Description ==
=== Vegetative characteristics ===
Nymphaea × khurooi is a perennial, rhizomatous aquatic herb with a horizontal rhizome. The petiolate leaf with an entire margin and rounded basal lobes has impressed veins. The leaf surface does not have a mottling pattern. The juvenile leaves display bronze colouration. The petiole has four central air canals.

=== Generative characteristics ===
The small, red flowers has a peduncle with five central canals. The flowers have 23–28 petals. The androeceum consists of 75–100 stamens with 20 mm long filaments and yellow-orange anthers. The gynoeceum consists of 17–22 carpels. It is sterile.

== Taxonomy ==
It was described by Milind Madhav Sardesai and Mayur Dhondiram Nandikar in 2020. The type specimen was collected by A. Hassan and A. Masoodi on the 11th of October 2018 in Jammu-Kashmir, India.

=== Etymology ===
The hybrid name khurooi refers to Anzar Ahmad Khuroo from the University of Kashmir.

=== Hybridisation ===
It is a hybrid of Nymphaea alba and Nymphaea odorata.

== Distribution ==
It has been naturalised in India (Meghalaya, Jammu & Kashmir), where it occurs in lakes.

== Habitat ==
It occurs in lakes.
