= Nymphaea × thiona =

Scientific classification
- Kingdom: Plantae
- Clade: Tracheophytes
- Clade: Angiosperms
- Order: Nymphaeales
- Family: Nymphaeaceae
- Genus: Nymphaea
- Subgenus: Nymphaea subg. Nymphaea
- Species: N. × thiona

Binomial name
- Nymphaea × thiona D.B.Ward

Species of water lily

Nymphaea × thiona is a species of waterlily native to the US-American states Alabama, Florida, and Georgia. Additionally, it has been introduced to Costa Rica, as well as the US-American states Kentucky, and Nevada. It is a natural hybrid of Nymphaea mexicana and Nymphaea odorata.

== Description ==
Parent species of the natural hybrid
Nymphaea × thiona D.B.Ward

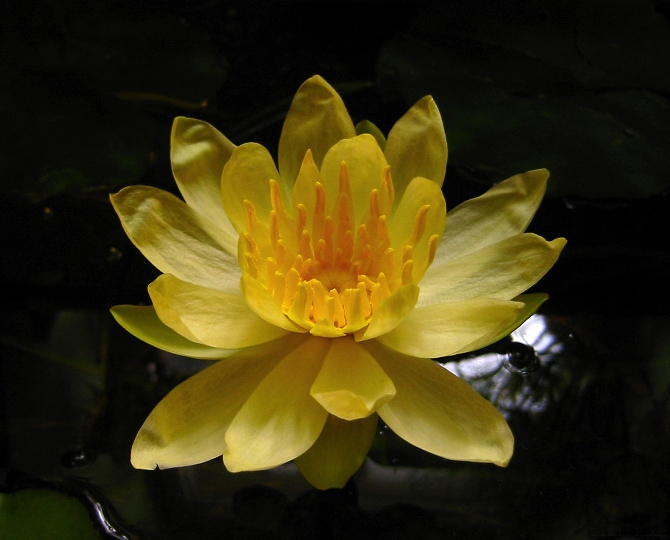
Nymphaea mexicana Zucc.

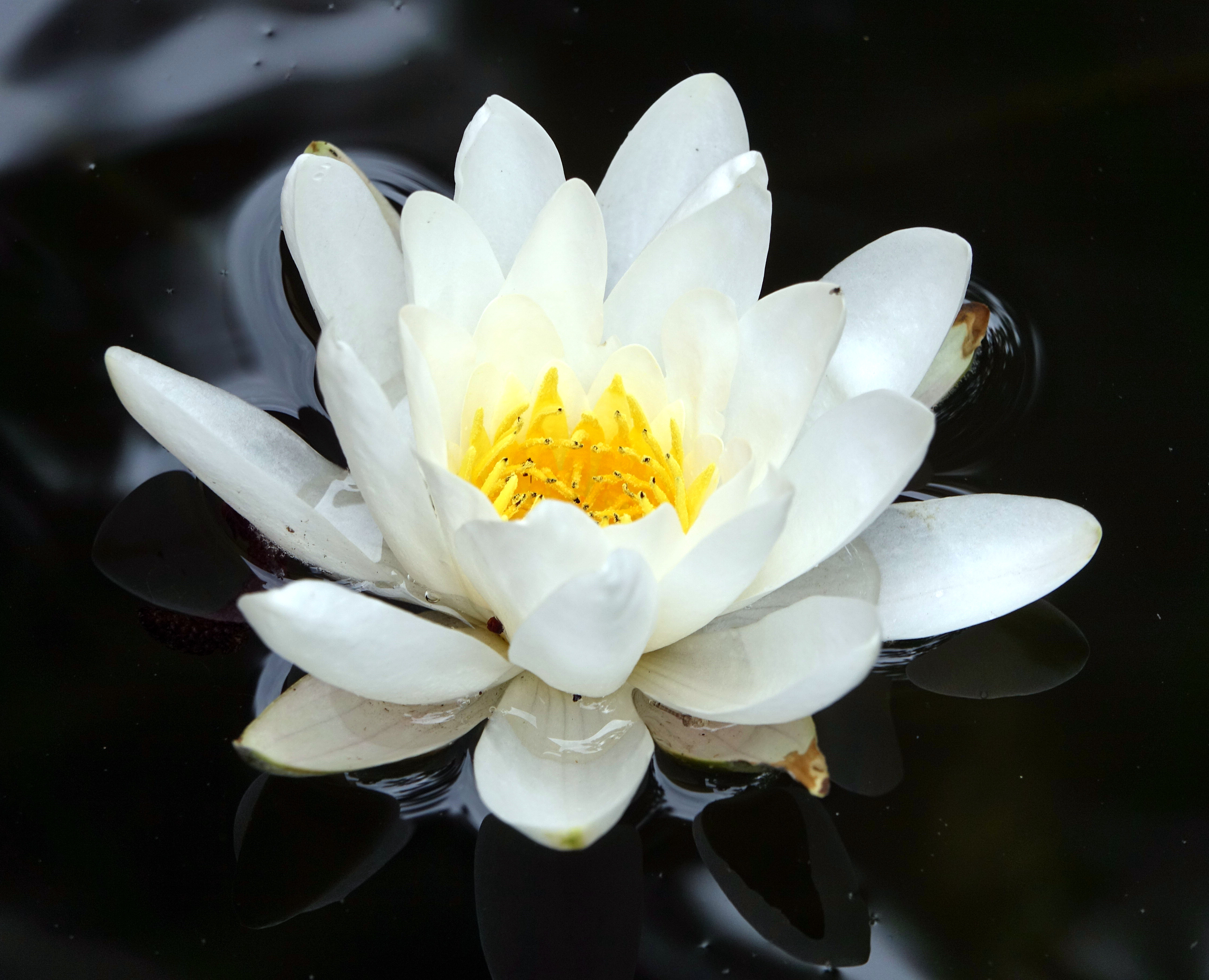
Nymphaea odorata Aiton

=== Vegetative characteristics ===
Nymphaea × thiona is a perennial herb. The rhizomes can be stoloniferous or not stoloniferous. It exhibits more vigorous growth than its parent species.

=== Generative characteristics ===
The flowers extend above the water surface. The flowers are larger than flowers of Nymphaea mexicana, and more yellow than Nymphaea odorata flowers. Fruits are unknown.

== Reproduction ==
It is a sterile hybrid. Fruits have never been observed. It can reproduce through stolons.

== Taxonomy ==
It was first described by Daniel Bertram Ward in 1977. The type specimen was collected by C. Hoy in drainage canals of marshes in St. Marks National Wildlife Refuge, in Wakulla County, Florida, USA on the 15th of April 1962. It is placed in the subgenus Nymphaea subg. Nymphaea.

=== Etymology ===
The specific epithet thiona expresses an association to the name Sulphur Waterlily.

== Distribution ==
It exists in areas of sympatric occurrence of the two parent species. It is native to the USA (Alabama, Florida, and Georgia). It has been introduced to other American states (Kentucky, and Nevada), Costa Rica, New Zealand, Italy, and Sweden.

== Cultivation ==
It is also known from artificial, horticultural hybridisation.
