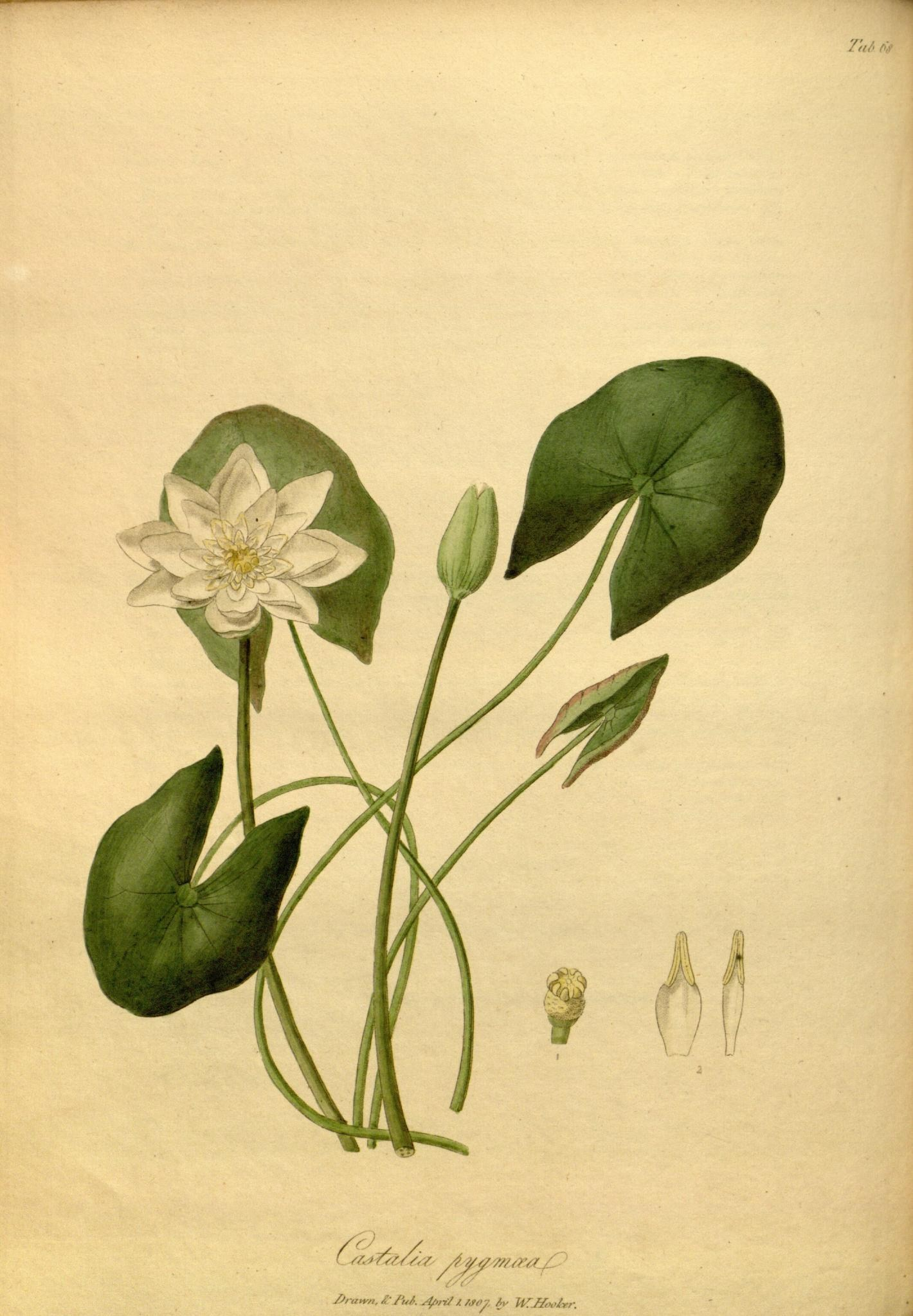
- Illustration of Nymphaea pygmaea

Scientific classification
- Kingdom: Plantae
- Clade: Tracheophytes
- Clade: Angiosperms
- Order: Nymphaeales
- Family: Nymphaeaceae
- Genus: Nymphaea
- Subgenus: Nymphaea subg. Nymphaea
- Section: Nymphaea sect. Chamaenymphaea
- Species: N. pygmaea

Binomial name
- Nymphaea pygmaea (Salisb.) W.T.Aiton

Synonyms
- List: *Castalia pygmaea Salisb.; *Nymphaea pygmaea var. minima Nakai; *Nymphaea minima (Nakai) Nakai; *Nymphaea tetragona var. minima (Nakai) W.Lee; *Nymphaea japono-koreana Nakai; *Nymphaea tetragona var. tetragona

= Nymphaea pygmaea =

Species of water lily

Nymphaea pygmaea is a controversial species of perennial, aquatic herb in the family Nymphaeaceae native to Asia.

== Description ==
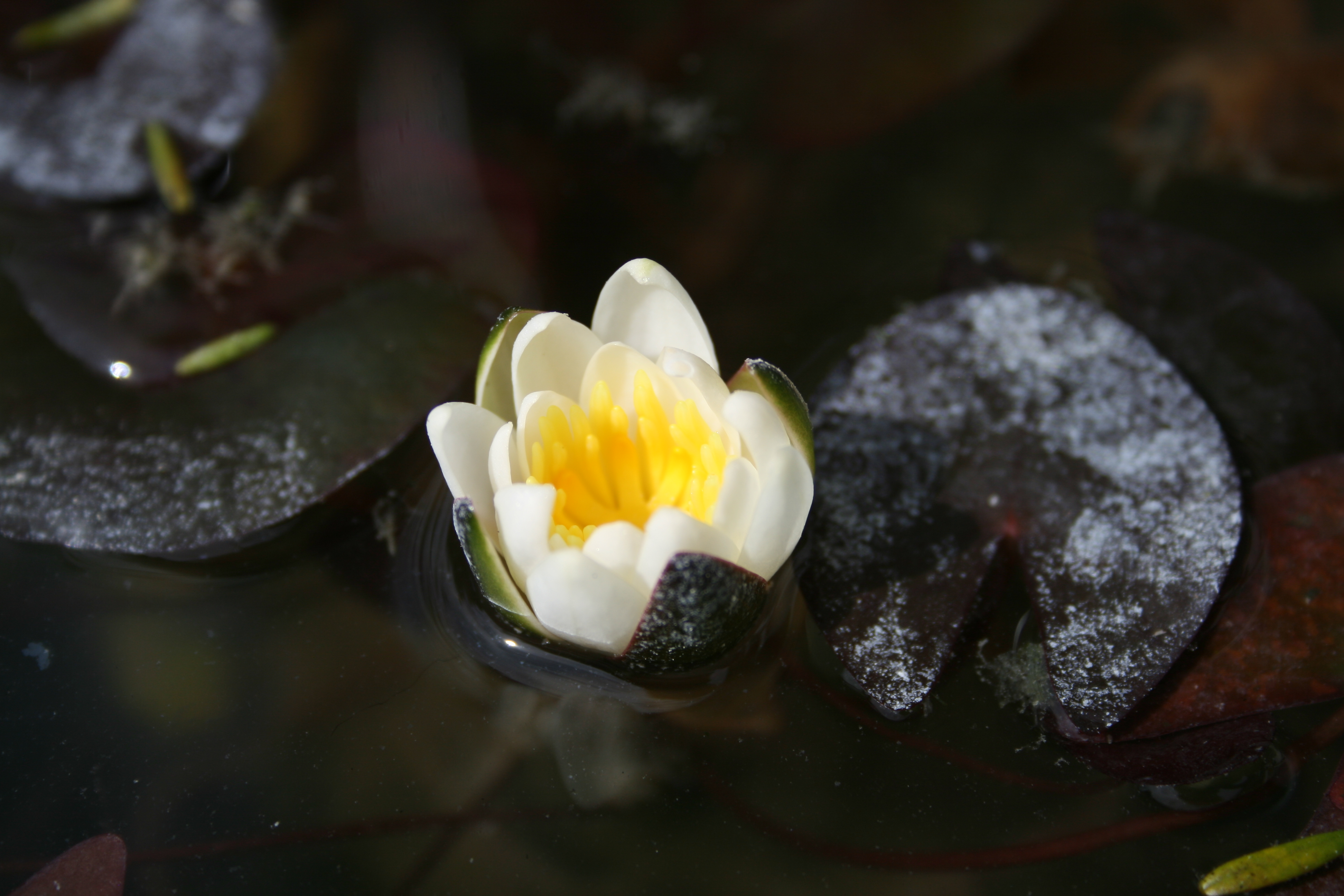
Nymphaea pygmaea flower and floating leaves

=== Vegetative characteristics ===
It is a perennial, aquatic herb with erect, cylindrical, unbranched rhizomes without stolons. The obovate to orbicular, thick, 5.5–24 cm long, and 4.5–21 cm wide leaves with diverging basal lobes have an entire margin. The upper leaf surface is green to purple. The petiole is slender.

=== Generative characteristics ===
The white, floating, 3–6 cm wide flower has four sepals with an obtuse apex and 5–17 petals with an obtuse apex. The androecium consists of 24–71 stamens. The gynoecium consists of 5-11 carpels. The globose fruit bears ellipsoid to ovoid, 1.9–3.6 mm long, and 1.3–2.6 mm wide seeds.

== Cytology ==
The chromosome count is 2n = 42 or 2n = 84. The ploidy level is 6x.

== Taxonomy ==
It was first published as Castalia pygmaea Salisb. by Richard Anthony Salisbury in 1807. It was placed in the genus Nymphaea L. as Nymphaea pygmaea (Salisb.) W.T.Aiton by William Townsend Aiton published in 1811. It is widely regarded as a synonym of Nymphaea tetragona Georgi. The circumscription of Nymphaea tetragona in East Asia is however problematic and these problematic plants may be deserving of the status of a separate species Nymphaea pygmaea. There are several studies supporting this separate status.

=== Position within Nymphaea ===
Within the subgenus Nymphaea subg. Nymphaea, it is placed in the section Nymphaea sect. Chamaenymphaea, of which it is the type species. It is identified as the sister group to Nymphaea tetragona and Nymphaea leibergii based on nuclear ribosomal DNA, but the relationships based on the analysis of the chloroplast DNA is unclear.

== Etymology ==
The specific epithet pygmaea means small or dwarf.

== Ecology ==
=== Habitat ===
It occurs in lakes, ponds, marshes, and rice fields.
