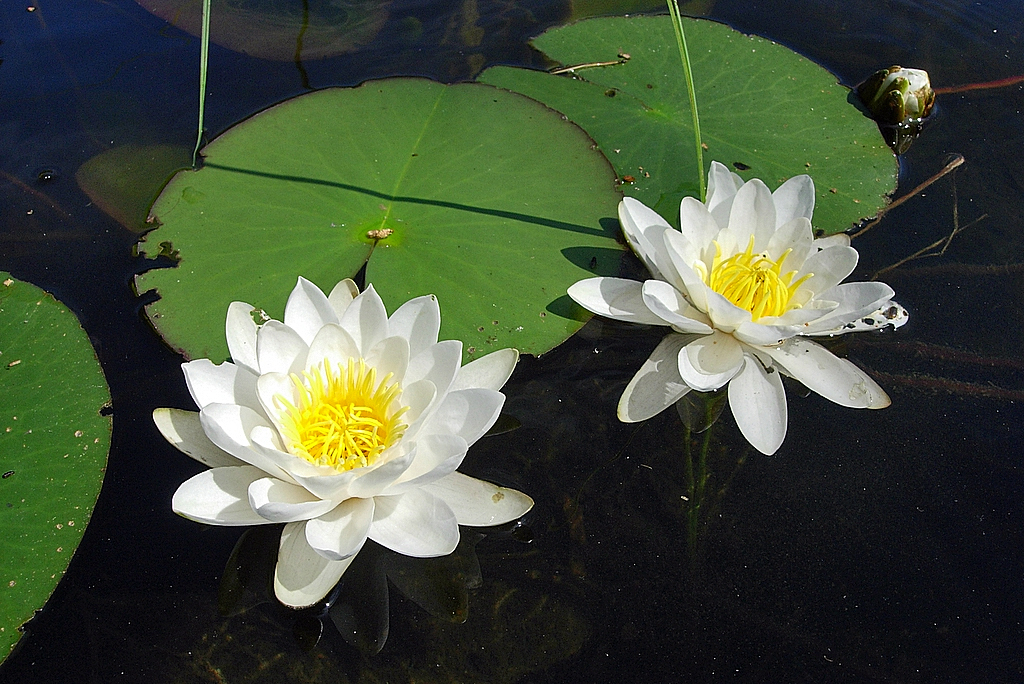

Scientific classification
- Kingdom: Plantae
- Clade: Tracheophytes
- Clade: Angiosperms
- Order: Nymphaeales
- Family: Nymphaeaceae
- Genus: Nymphaea
- Subgenus: Nymphaea subg. Nymphaea
- Species: N. candida

Binomial name
- Nymphaea candida C.Presl

Synonyms
- List: Castalia candida (C.Presl) Schinz & Thell.; Leuconymphaea candida (C.Presl) Kuntze; Nymphaea alba subsp. candida (C.Presl) Korsh.; Nymphaea alba var. oocarpa Casp. Castalia colchica Woronow ex Grossh.; Castalia semiaperta (C.Klinggr.) Fritsch; Nymphaea alba var. aperta Casp. Nymphaea alba var. cachemiriana; (Cambess.) Hook.f. & Thomson Nymphaea alba var. chlorocarpa Casp.; Nymphaea alba var. erythrocarpa Casp. Nymphaea alba var. kashmiriana Hook.f. & Thomson; Nymphaea alba var. semiaperta Schmalh. Nymphaea alba f. volvata Casp.; Nymphaea cachemiriana Cambess. Nymphaea candida var. minor Vain.; Nymphaea colchica (Woronow ex Grossh.) Kem.-Nath.; Nymphaea nitida Sims Nymphaea pauciradiata Bunge; Nymphaea punctata Kar. & Kir. Nymphaea semiaperta C.Klinggr.

= Nymphaea candida =

Species of water lily

Nymphaea candida is a species of perennial, aquatic, rhizomatous herb in the family Nymphaeaceae native to the region spanning from Europe to Siberia and Western Himalaya.

== Description ==
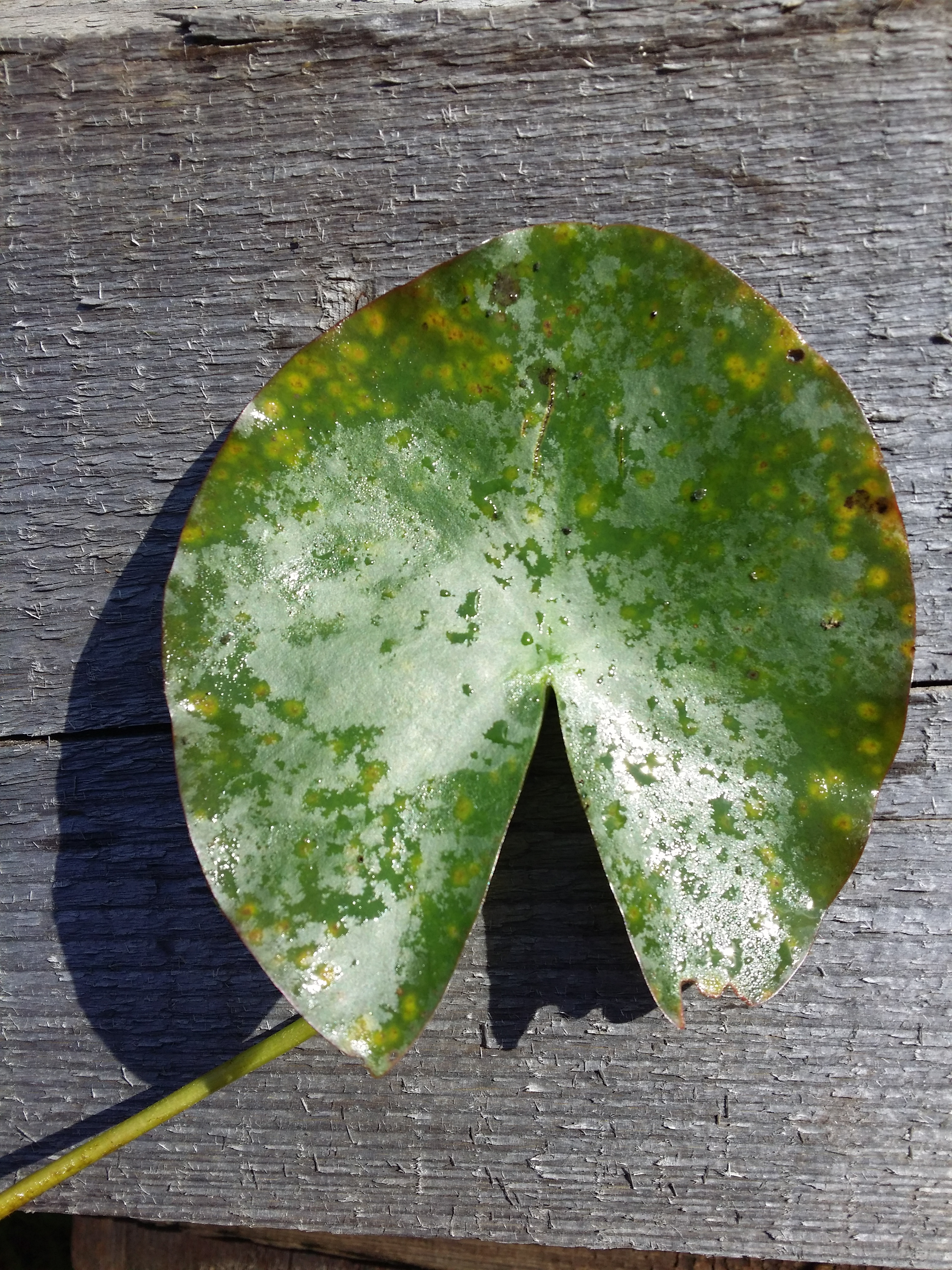
Adaxial leaf surface of Nymphaea candida
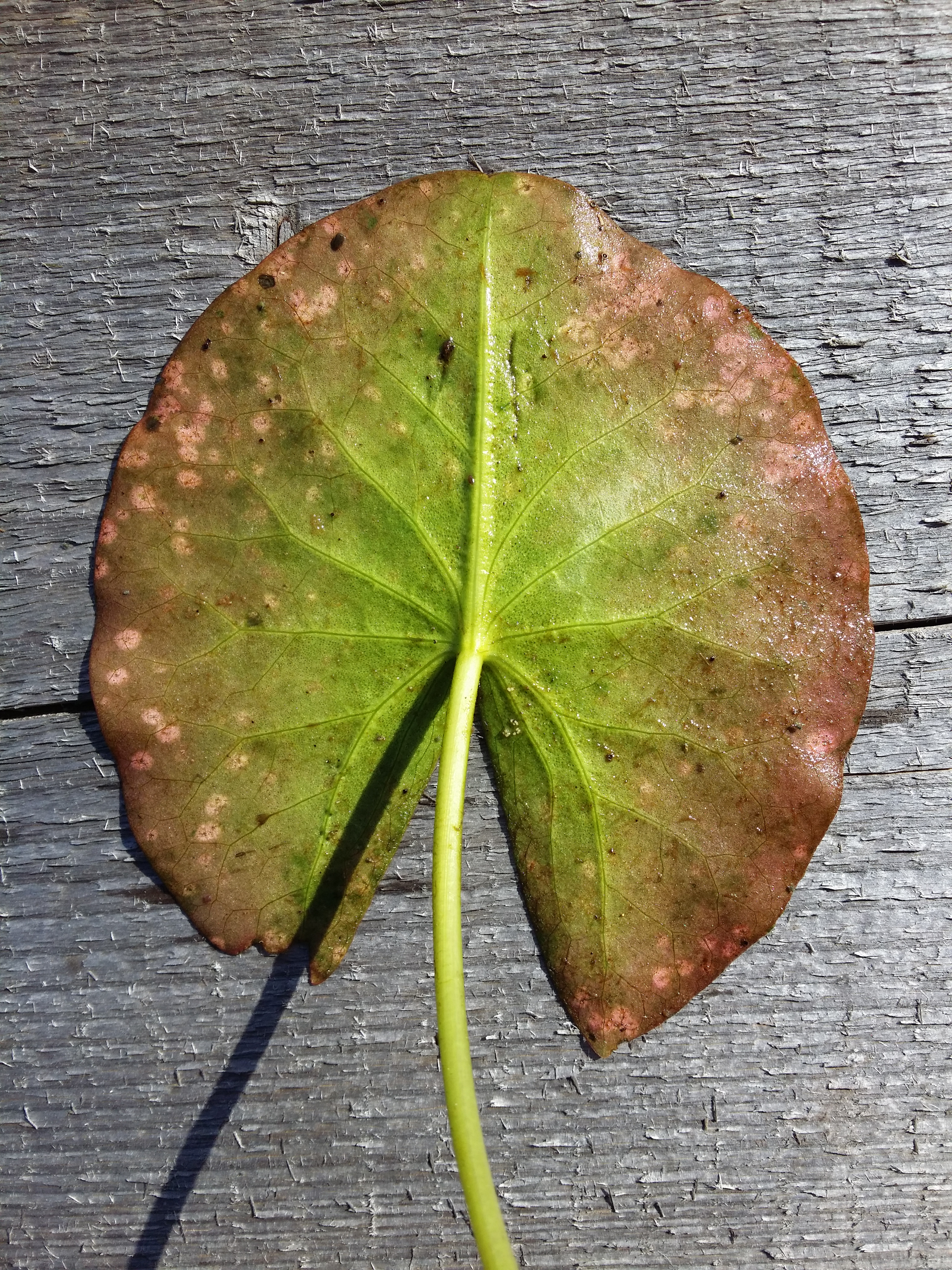
Abaxial leaf surface of Nymphaea candida

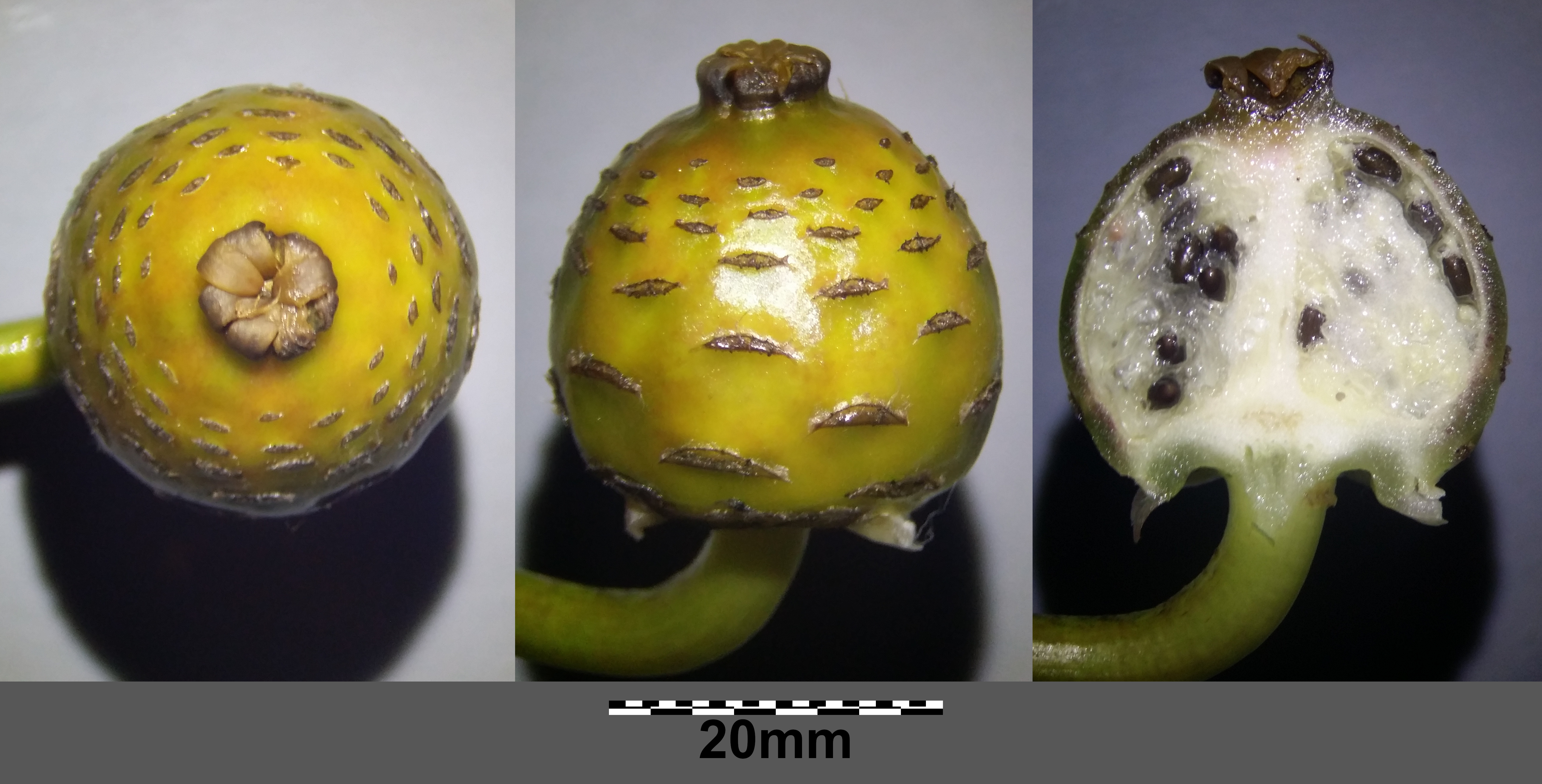
Nymphaea candida fruit

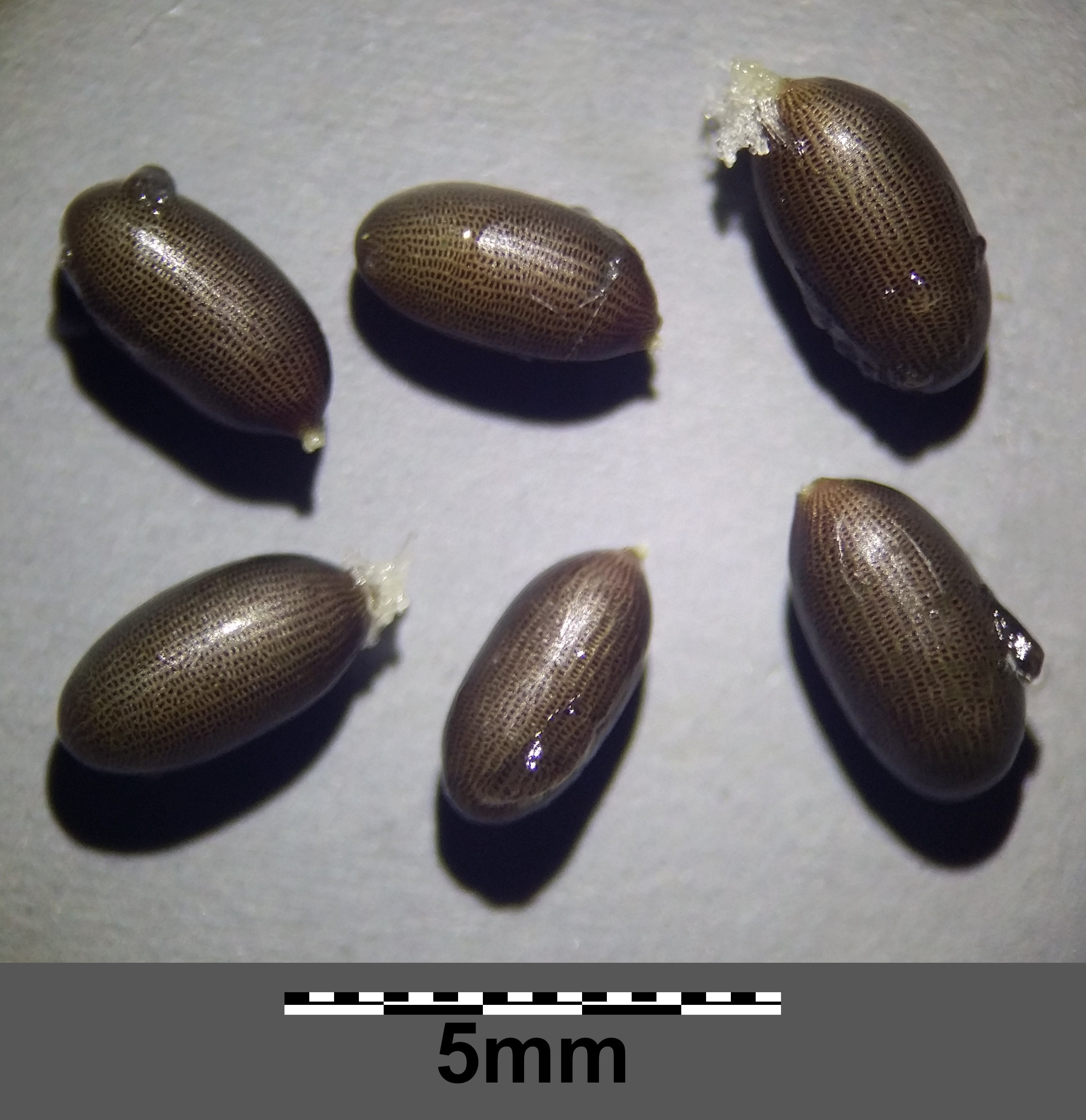
Nymphaea candida seeds

=== Vegetative characteristics ===
Nymphaea candida is a perennial, aquatic, rhizomatous herb with unbranched, 5 cm wide rhizomes. The petiolate, stipulate, oval to suborbicular floating leaf with an entire margin and a deep basal sinus is 10–30 cm long, and 25 cm wide. The oblong submerged leaves have a thin lamina and short petioles. The thick, terete, smooth, 30–100(–160) cm long petiole has air canals.

=== Generative characteristics ===
The bisexual, actinomorphic, 5–15 cm wide flower floats on the water surface. The 4(–5) oblong to ovate-oblong sepals are 3.8 cm long, and 1.3 cm wide. The 12–20 white petals are 3–5.5 cm long and show a gradual transition towards the stamens. The petals decrease in size towards the centre of the flower. The androecium consists of 32–70 stamens. The gynoecium consists of 6–14 carpels. The red or yellow stigmatic disk is concave. The green to red, ovoid to spherical, 1.9–4.4 cm wide fruit with persistent sepals bears ellipsoid, brown, arillate, 4-6 mm long, and 3-4 mm wide seeds.

=== Cytology ===
The chromosome count is 2n = 112, 160. The genome size is 1936.44 Mb.

== Taxonomy ==
The plant was described by Carl Borivoj Presl in 1882. However, sometimes both Carl Borivoj Presl and Jan Svatopluk Presl are credited as the taxon authors. Within the subgenus Nymphaea subg. Nymphaea it is placed in the section Nymphaea sect. Nymphaea.

=== Etymology ===
The specific epithet candida from the Latin candidus means pure white.

== Distribution and habitat ==
It grows in the quiet freshwaters in Eurasia. The plant grows only in water, as it is an aquatic plant, mainly in ponds, lakes, and slow flowing streams.

== Conservation ==
It is endangered in China, and Germany.

== Use ==
It is cultivated as an ornamental plant in water gardens.
