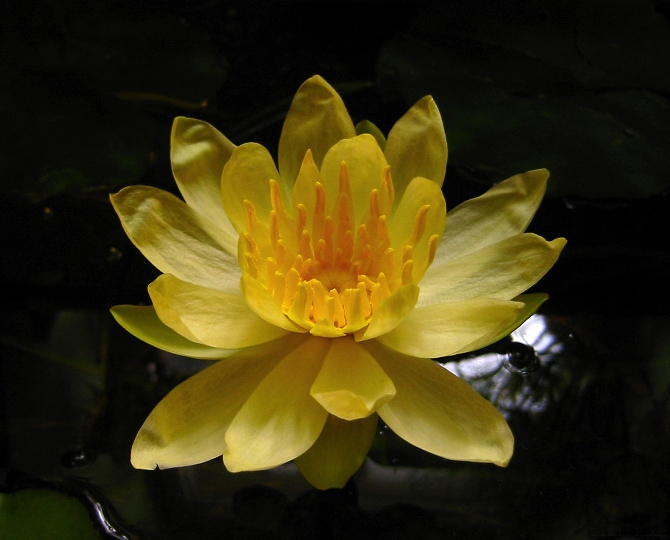

Conservation status
- Vulnerable (NatureServe)

Scientific classification
- Kingdom: Plantae
- Clade: Tracheophytes
- Clade: Angiosperms
- Order: Nymphaeales
- Family: Nymphaeaceae
- Genus: Nymphaea
- Subgenus: Nymphaea subg. Nymphaea
- Species: N. mexicana

Binomial name
- Nymphaea mexicana Zucc.

Synonyms
- List: Castalia mexicana (Zucc.) J.M.Coult.; Leuconymphaea mexicana (Zucc.) Kuntze; Castalia flava (Leitn. ex Audubon) Greene; Leuconymphaea flava (Leitn. ex Audubon) Kuntze; Nymphaea flava Leitn. ex Audubon; Nymphaea lutea Treat; Nymphaea planchonii Casp. ex Conard

= Nymphaea mexicana =

Species of aquatic plant

Nymphaea mexicana is a species of aquatic plant that is native to the Southern United States and Mexico as far south as Michoacán. Common names include yellow water lily, Mexican water lily and banana water lily.

== Description ==
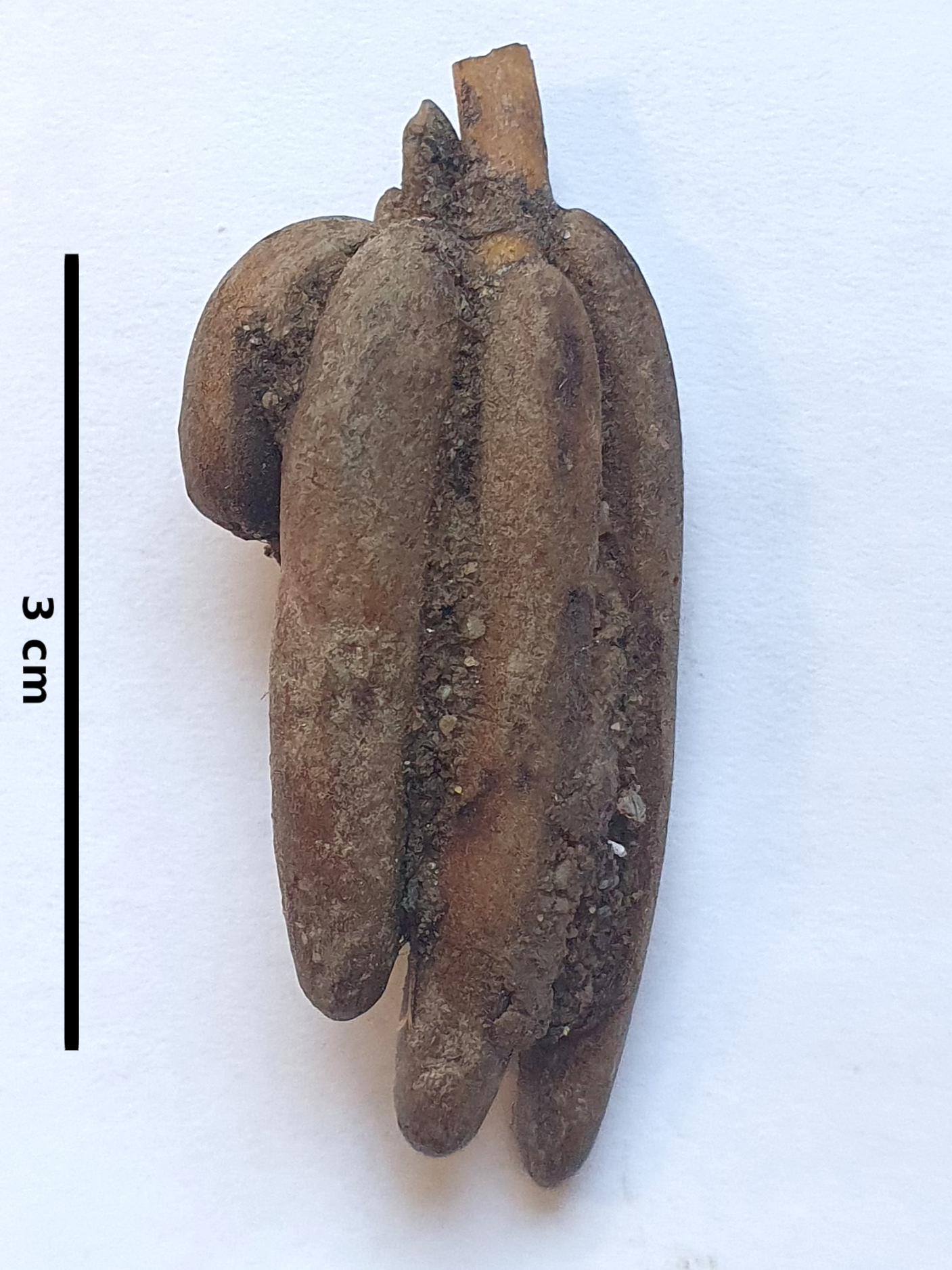
Nymphaea mexicana Zucc. stolon with scale bar (3 cm) on a white background

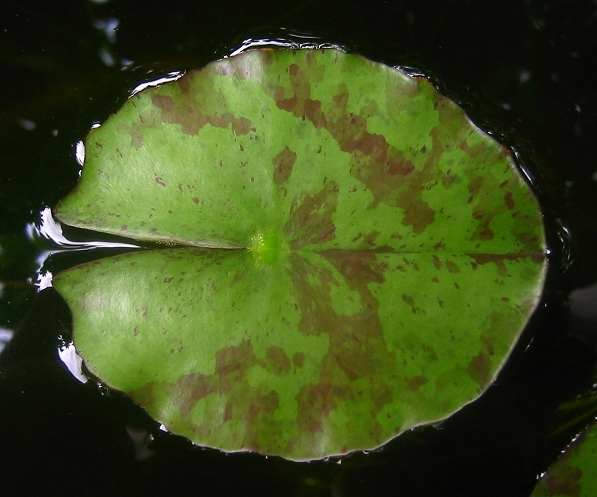
Upper leaf surface

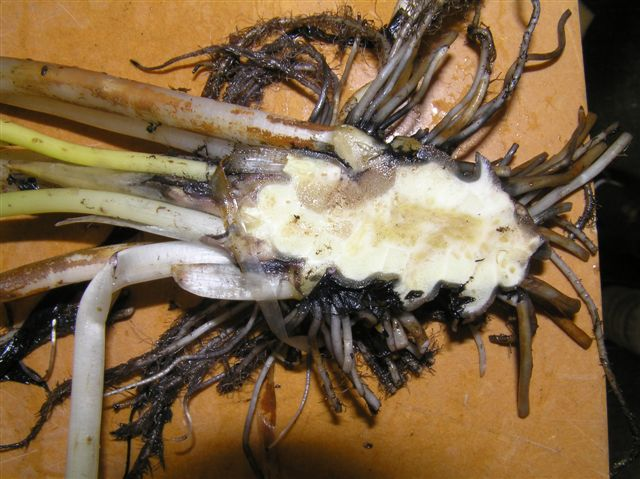
Longitudinally cut rhizome

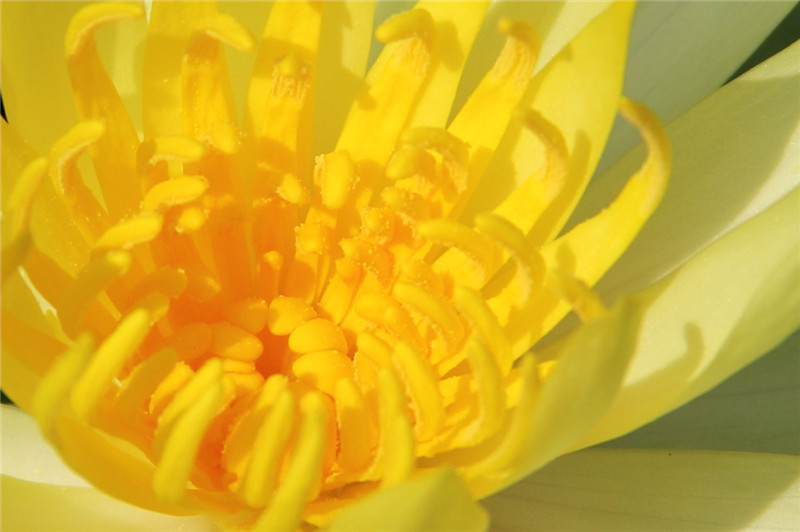
A close-up of the flower

=== Vegetative characteristics ===
Nymphaea mexicana is a rhizomatous, aquatic, perennial herb with stoloniferous, up to 30 cm long, and 4 cm wide rhizomes. The rhizomes bear leaf and root scars. The stolons are 15–100 cm long, and 0.5–1 cm wide. The ovate, suborbicular, or elliptic lamina is 7–18(–27) cm long, and 7–14(–18) cm wide. The long, cylindrical petiole is glabrous.

=== Generative characteristics ===
The floating or emersed, yellow, 6–13 cm wide flowers have peduncles with four primary air canals. The flowers have four sepals and 12–30 yellow petals. The androecium consists of 50 stamens. The gynoecium consists of seven to ten carpels. The spheroid or ovoid fruit bears 3–5 mm long, and 3–5 mm wide seeds with hairlike papillae. Tuberiferous flowers or proliferating pseudanthia can be present.

=== Cytology ===
The chromosome count is n = 28. The genome size is 586.80 Mb. The chloroplast genome is 159962 bp long.

== Taxonomy ==
It was published by Joseph Gerhard Zuccarini in 1832. Within the subgenus Nymphaea subg. Nymphaea it is placed in the section Nymphaea sect. Xanthantha.

=== Etymology ===
The specific epithet mexicana refers to Mexico.

=== Hybridisation ===
Together with Nymphaea odorata, it forms the natural hybrid Nymphaea × thiona.

== Reproduction ==
=== Vegetative reproduction ===
Nymphaea mexicana reproduces vegetatively through stolons. Their structure, resembling bananas, consists of leaf buds and thick, starchy roots. Additionally, tuberiferous flowers or proliferating pseudanthia can be present.

== Conservation ==
The NatureServe conservation status is Vulnerable (G3).

== Ecology ==
=== Habitat ===
It occurs in up to 4 m deep water in lagoons, canals swamps, and rivers. It can occur in brackish water.

=== Herbivory ===
The canvasback duck, Aythya valisineria, feeds on the banana-like roots of the plant.

=== As an invasive species ===
Together with its hybrids, it has become an invasive species outside of its natural range. For instance, it has been recorded in Australia, South Africa, New Zealand, and the Iberian Peninsula.
