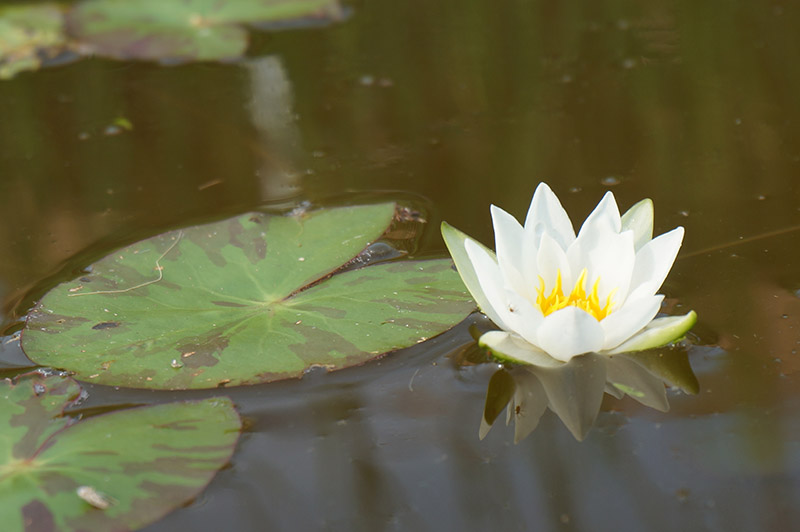

Conservation status
- Least Concern (IUCN 3.1)

- Secure (NatureServe)

Scientific classification
- Kingdom: Plantae
- Clade: Tracheophytes
- Clade: Angiosperms
- Order: Nymphaeales
- Family: Nymphaeaceae
- Genus: Nymphaea
- Subgenus: Nymphaea subg. Nymphaea
- Section: Nymphaea sect. Chamaenymphaea
- Species: N. tetragona

Binomial name
- Nymphaea tetragona Georgi

Synonyms
- List: Castalia crassifolia Hand.-Mazz.; Castalia pygmaea Salisb.; Castalia rudgeana Tratt.; Castalia tetragona (Georgi) G.Lawson; Leuconymphaea tetragona (Georgi) Kuntze; Nymphaea crassifolia (Hand.-Mazz.) Nakai; Nymphaea esquirolii H.Lév. & Vaniot; Nymphaea fennica Mela; Nymphaea japono-koreana Nakai; Nymphaea pygmaea (Salisb.) W.T.Aiton; Nymphaea tetragona var. crassifolia (Hand.-Mazz.) Y.C.Chu; Nymphaea tetragona var. minima (Nakai) W.Lee; Nymphaea tetragona var. wenzelii (Maack ex Regel) Vorosch.; Nymphaea wenzelii Maack ex Regel

= Nymphaea tetragona =

Species of water lily

Nymphaea tetragona is an aquatic perennial, species of flowering plant commonly called pygmy waterlily and small white water lily, belonging to the family Nymphaeaceae.

== Description ==
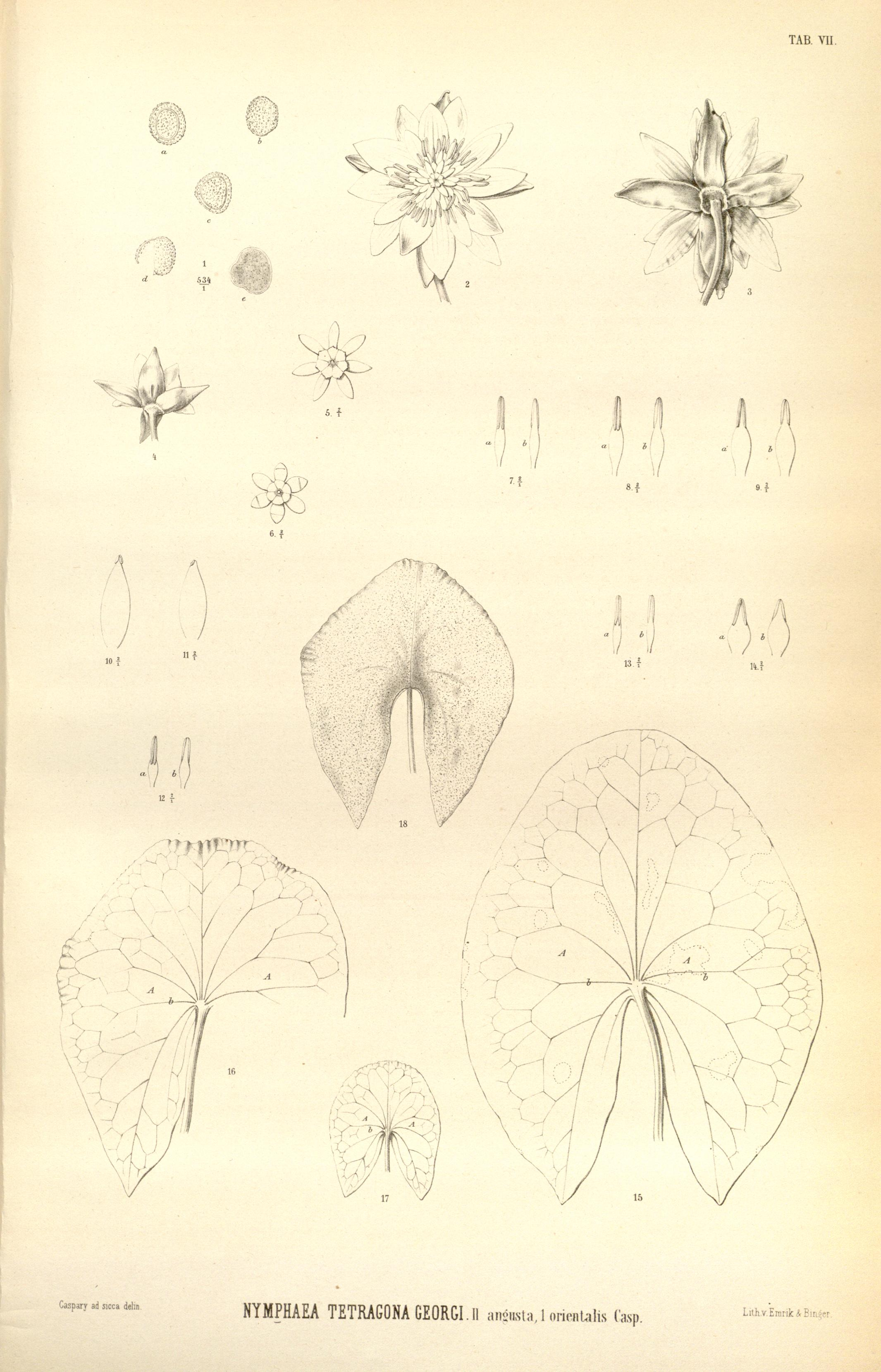
Illustration in Annales Musei Botanici Lugduno-Batavi.

=== Vegetative characteristics ===
The leaves can be cordate or ovate with entire margins and may be tinted purple or sometimes mottled reddish brown or purple. The rhizomes are erect and unbranched.

=== Generative characteristics ===
Plants produce a single floating flower that is 1.5 to 3 inches wide, with up to 15 petals; each flower has 30 to 45 yellow stamens. The floating flower has petals that are white in colour. The sepals and out petals are produced in whorls of four, the sepals are green in color. The receptacle is four-angled and the sepals are inserted into it. The seeds are smooth and rounded in shape and 2-3 × 1.5-2 mm long, being 1.3-1.5 times as long as broad; the species has 112 pairs of chromosomes.

== Taxonomy ==
It was described by the German botanist Johann Gottlieb Georgi at the end of the eighteenth century from his collections in Eastern Siberia. The Komarov Botanical Institute has a herbarium specimen with the description "Nymphaea tetragona sp. nova" that is thought to be collected in 1772 from the Angara River and hand labelled by Georgi himself. With in the subgenus Nymphaea subg. Nymphaea it is placed in the section Nymphaea sect. Chamaenymphaea.

=== Etymology ===
The specific epithet tetragona means four-angled. The flower has a tetragonous receptacle.

== Distribution and habitat ==
Its distribution encompasses Midwestern Nepal, China, India, Japan, Kashmir, Kazakhstan, Korea, Russia, Vietnam, North America, and Europe.

In North America and Europe it native range is restricted to the boreal regions above 50° N latitude.

Nymphaea tetragona inhabits ponds, lakes, and quiet streams; and it is native to the region spanning from North Europe to Korea and Himalaya, and Subarctic America to Northwest USA. In Minnesota it is found in slow moving streams often associated with beavers that provide suitable habitat by building dams. In Minnesota the plants are typically found in water that is 1 to 2 meters deep growing in association with Zizania aquatica, Sagittaria sp, Scirpus sp, and Typha sp; Nymphaea odorata var. tuberosa and Nuphar variegata (Yellow Pond-lily) are also commonly found in the same locations.

== Ecology ==
The leaves are sometimes affected by a fungal pathogen, Rhamphospora nymphaeae, forming spots.

== Reproduction ==
N. tetragona reproduces sexually by seeds. The mature fruits on the plant decay to reveal the seed and remain buoyant for approximately a day which is important for dispersal because the habitat of N. tetragona tends to encompass calm waters like ponds, swamps, lakes, or streams. Dispersal over longer distances in water is facilitated through fish which like to feed on the seeds of N. tetragona, overland via waterbirds, or dispersed by humans. The establishment of the seed in the appropriate ecological conditions for N. tetragona to thrive and reproduce is considered to be more important than dispersal ability which appears to generally be sufficient.

== Conservation status ==
According to the IUCN Red List of Threatened Species, N. tetragona was listed as Least Concern in 2010. The NatureServe conservation status is G5 Secure. It has the broadest global distribution of any species in this genus so the conservation status of the species can vary by region. It is considered an endangered species in China and India. In China, the depletion of wetlands has caused N. tetragona populations to decrease. Across the N. tetragona species, populations are most at risk from the destruction of their habitat and overexploitation. In British Columbia, Canada, N. tetragona is listed as a blue-listed taxon meaning it is at risk and of Special Concern. It is also considered threatened in some states of the United States including Maine. It is listed as a threatened species the US state of Minnesota.

== Cultural significance ==
N. tetragona is an important ornamental plant. The buds of the leaf and the seeds can also be used as food. In Buddhism, it is used as an offering flower. It has a rich history of use in ethnomedicine. Tribal practitioners of herbal medicine would use the rhizomes of N. tetragona to treat dysentery and diarrhea. Furthermore, it was used to treat ailments like diarrhea with dysentery, enteritis, fever, painful urine discharge, and urinary passage infections in folk medicine. On the other hand, herbal medicine practitioners used it to treat bronchial congestion and kidney pain.

== Pharmacological properties ==
N. tetragona is the first species in the family Nymphaeaceae to have Geraniin isolated and it showed evidence of inhibiting disease causing bacteria in fish. A 50% methanol extract of N. tetragona has shown to be a safe method that works well in inhibiting bacterial virulence factors via intercellular communication. As a result, the inhibitory properties of this extract could be effective in antimicrobial products to fight against bacterial resistance and infections. Furthermore, a specific application for a 50% methanol extract of N. tetragona has been proposed as a part of an antimicrobial treatment in combination with antibiotics for fighting against the bacterial resistance of a Salmonella infection in humans and animals alike.
