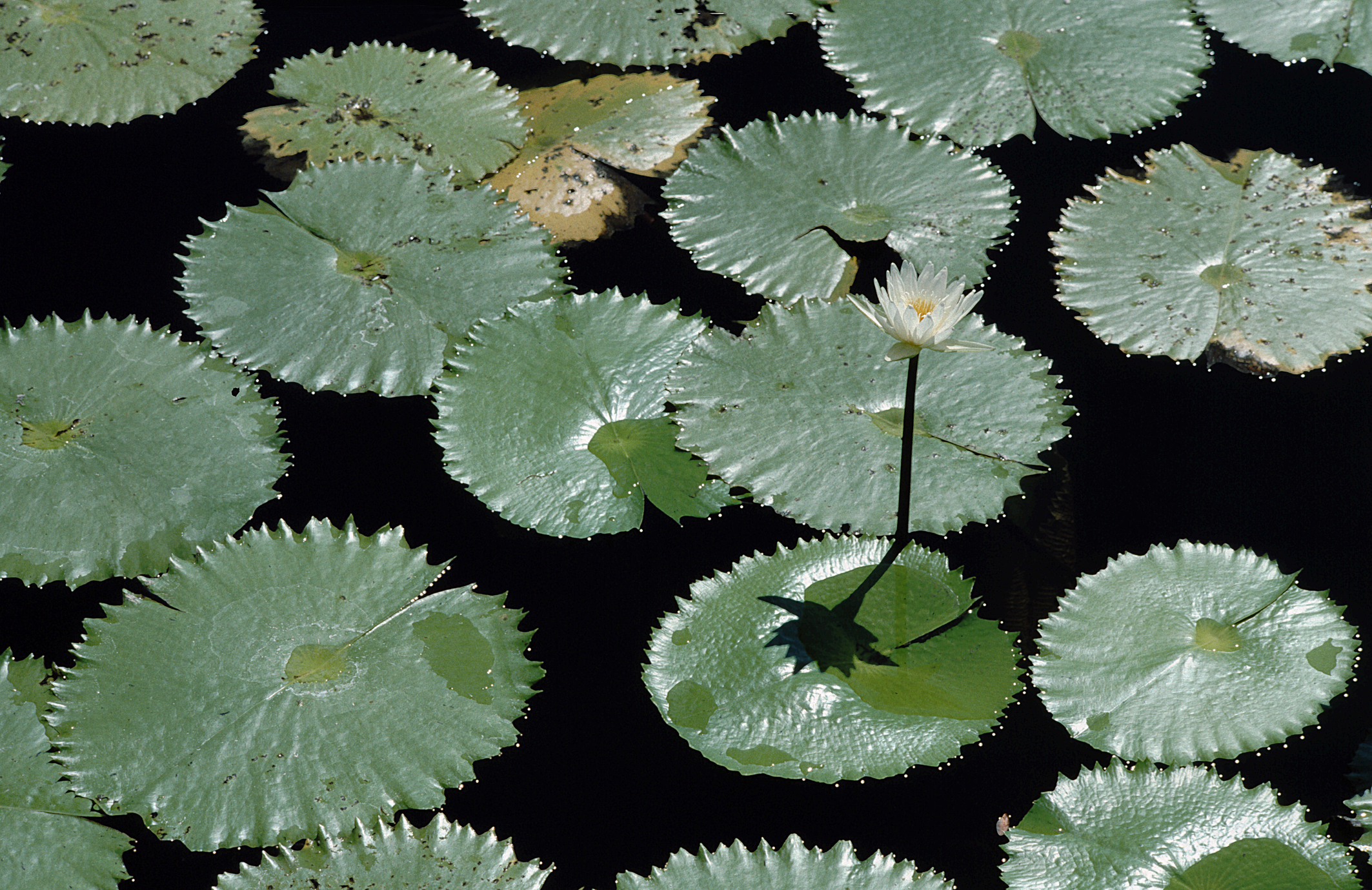
- In bloom in Guatemala
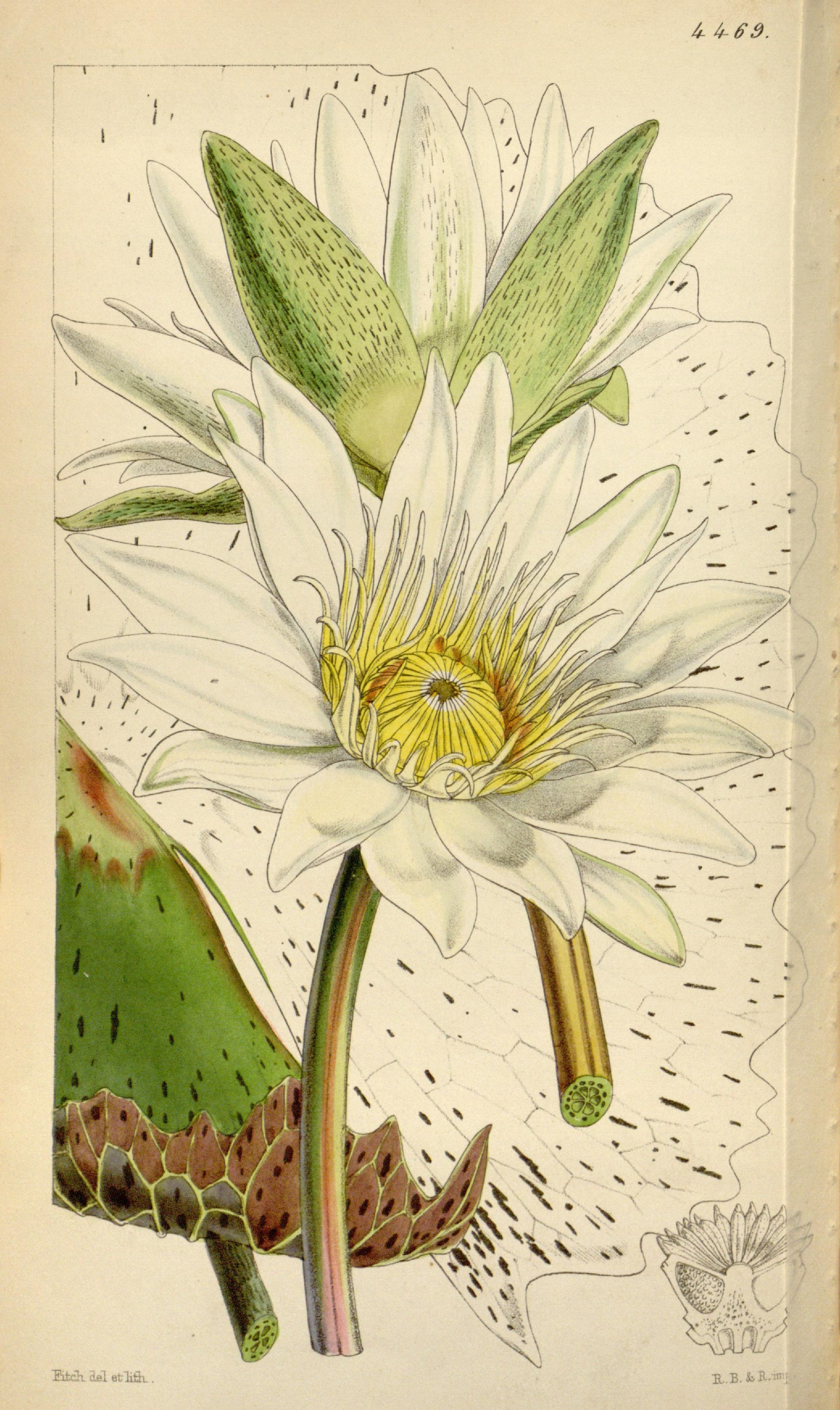
- Botanical illustration

Conservation status
- Secure (NatureServe)

Scientific classification
- Kingdom: Plantae
- Clade: Embryophytes
- Clade: Tracheophytes
- Clade: Angiosperms
- Order: Nymphaeales
- Family: Nymphaeaceae
- Genus: Nymphaea
- Subgenus: Nymphaea subg. Brachyceras
- Species: N. ampla

Binomial name
- Nymphaea ampla (Salisb.) DC.

Synonyms
- Castalia ampla Salisb.; Leuconymphaea ampla (Salisb.) Kuntze; Nymphaea ampla var. parviflora Griseb.; Nymphaea ampla var. plumieri Planch.; Nymphaea candolleana Lehm.; Nymphaea sinuata Salzm. ex Planch., not validly publ.

= Nymphaea ampla =

Species of flowering plant

Nymphaea ampla, also known as the dotleaf waterlily, is a species of flowering plant in the family Nymphaeaceae. It is native to Texas, Florida, Mexico, Central America, the Caribbean, and northern and western South America.

It is depicted in Mayan art alongside jaguars and kings, held cultural significance as a symbol of life, fertility, and birth, with its opiate-like effects used for calming and inducing mild trances.

== Description ==
=== Vegetative characteristics ===
Nymphaea ampla is a perennial herb with dark brown, ovoid, unbranched rhizomes without stolons. The coriaceous, ovate to orbiculate floating leaves with a dentate margin are 15–45 cm (5.9–17.7 in) long, and 15–45 cm wide.

=== Generative characteristics ===
The yellowish white, fragrant, diurnal, 7–18 cm (2.8–7.1 in) wide flowers extend well beyond the water surface.

=== Cytology ===
The chromosome count is n = 14. The genome size is 772.62 Mb. The chloroplast genome is 159,879 bp long.

== Taxonomy ==
It was first described as Castalia ampla Salisb. by Richard Anthony Salisbury in 1805. It was moved to the genus Nymphaea L. as Nymphaea ampla (Salisb.) DC. by Augustin Pyramus de Candolle in 1821. It is placed in the subgenus Nymphaea subg. Brachyceras.

== Habitat ==
It occurs in ponds, canals, open freshwater lagoons, and drainage ditches.

== Cultural significance ==
Nymphaea ampla is widely represented in Mayan art, especially in its depictions with jaguars and Mayan kings. Its cultural importance can be seen in one of the Mayan names of the plant; nikte’ha’ (The Maya term nikte’ha’ literally means "flower of the water", but has also been interpreted symbolically as "vulva of the water") as it would have represented life, sexual activity, fertility, and birth. The plant causes opiate-like effects on the user and is known to have been used as a calmative and mild trance inducer.

== Conservation ==
In Guadeloupe it has been classified as near threatened (NT) in the France red list. The NatureServe conservation status is G5 Secure.

== Gallery ==
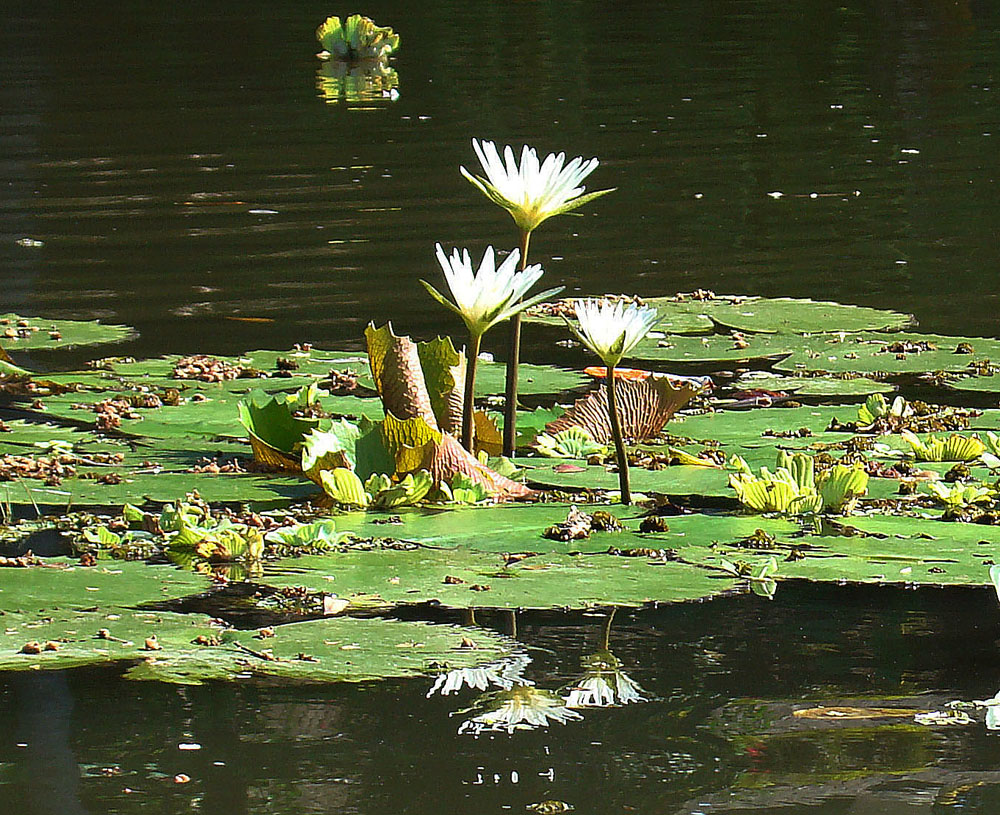
In Lake Nicaragua

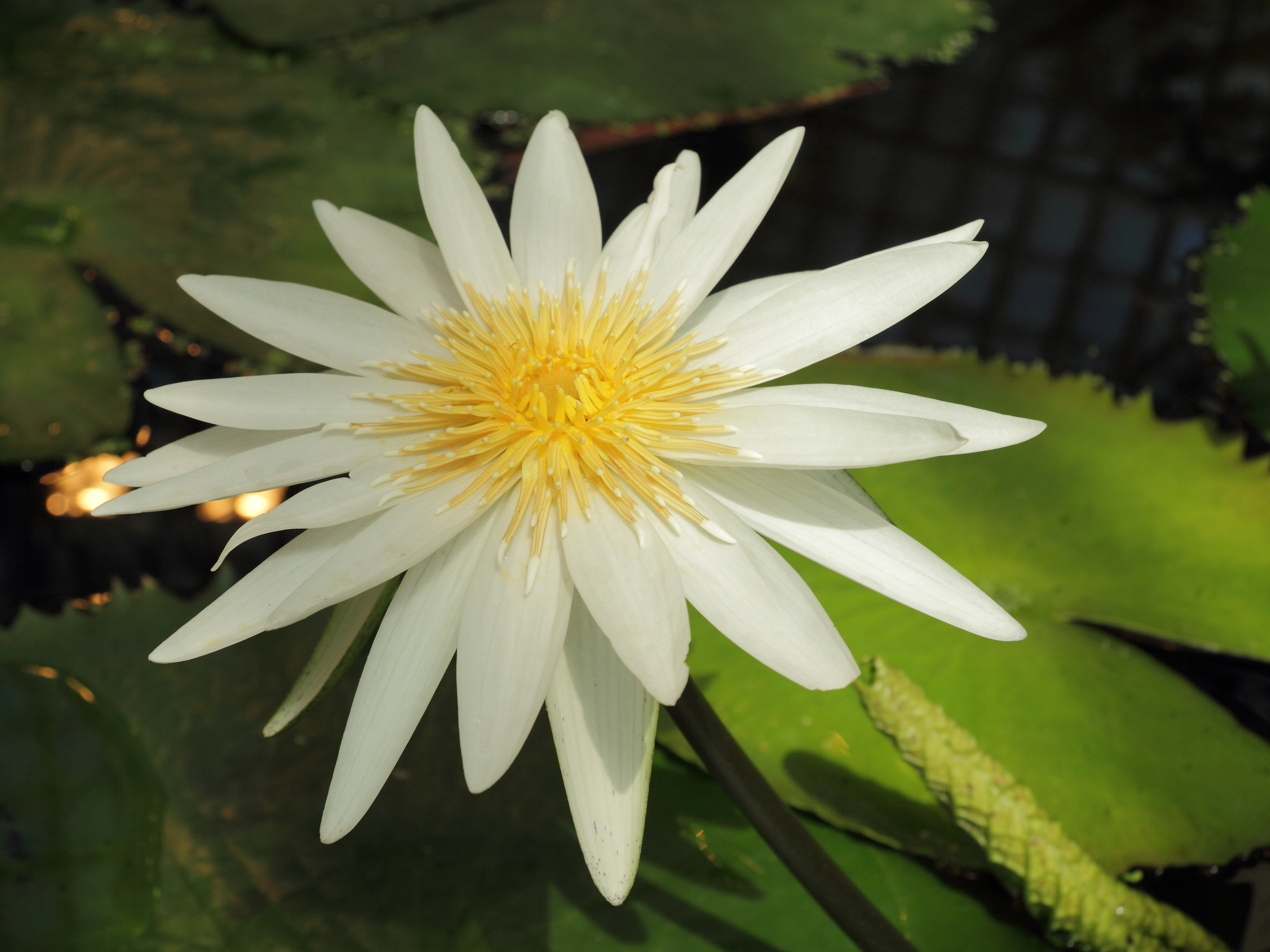
At the Bergianska trädgården

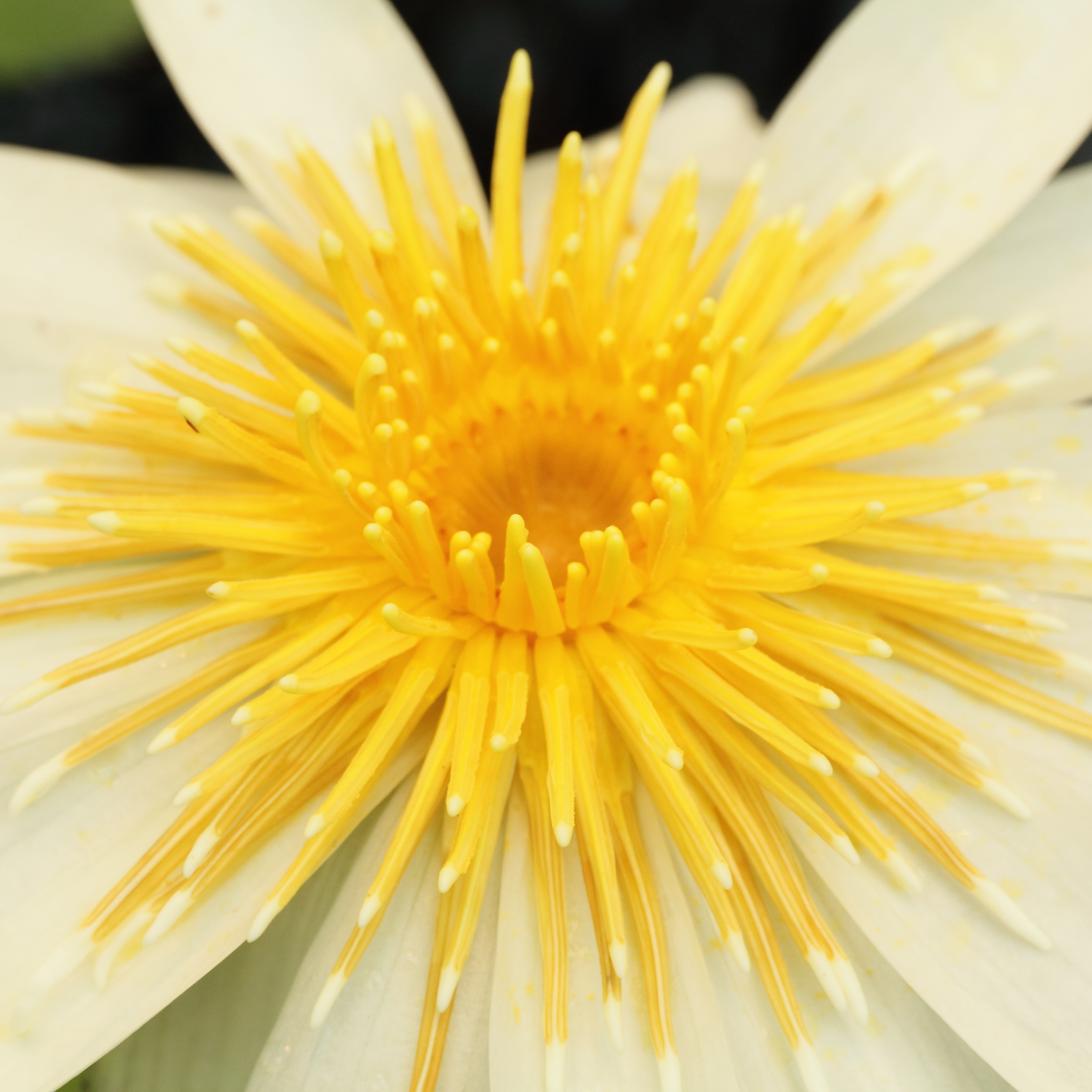
Close-up of flower
