= Nymphaea maculata =

Scientific classification
- Kingdom: Plantae
- Clade: Tracheophytes
- Clade: Angiosperms
- Order: Nymphaeales
- Family: Nymphaeaceae
- Genus: Nymphaea
- Subgenus: Nymphaea subg. Brachyceras
- Species: N. maculata

Binomial name
- Nymphaea maculata Schumach. & Thonn.

Synonyms
- Nymphaea discolor Lehm.; Nymphaea poecila Lehm.

Species of water lily

Nymphaea maculata is a species of waterlily native to tropical Africa.

== Description ==
=== Vegetative characteristics ===
Nymphaea maculata is a submerged, perennial, aquatic herb with subglobose rhizomes, and many long, filiform roots. The petiolate, ovate-cordate floating leaves have entire margins. The abaxial leaf surface is spotted. The green abaxial leaf surface with black spotting displays prominent, dichotomous, anastomosing venation.

=== Generative characteristics ===
The white, or blueish-white flowers are 3–8 cm wide. The flowers have four sepals, and 5-10 petals. The androecium consists of 30 stamens. The ovary is subglobose, and has 14 stigmatic rays. The carpels have slightly incurved teeth. The multilocular, rounded fruit bears numerous small, arillate, rounded seeds.

== Reproduction ==
=== Generative reproduction ===
Flowering occurs from February to March.

== Taxonomy ==
=== Publication ===
It was first described by Heinrich Christian Friedrich Schumacher and Peter Thonning in 1827.

== Etymology ==
The specific epithet maculata means spotted.

== Conservation ==
In Benin, it is regarded as vulnerable (VU). It will face changes in land use, and habitat fragmentation.

== Ecology ==
=== Habitat ===
It occurs in ponds, swamps, permanent spring pools, acid, shallow, oligotrophic pools, and shallow pools in marshes with very dark waters. It occurs sympatrically with Nymphaea lotus.

== Use ==
The rhizome is edible, and the fruits are eaten as well. In Cameroon, Nymphaea maculata is an important melliferous plant for honey production.
