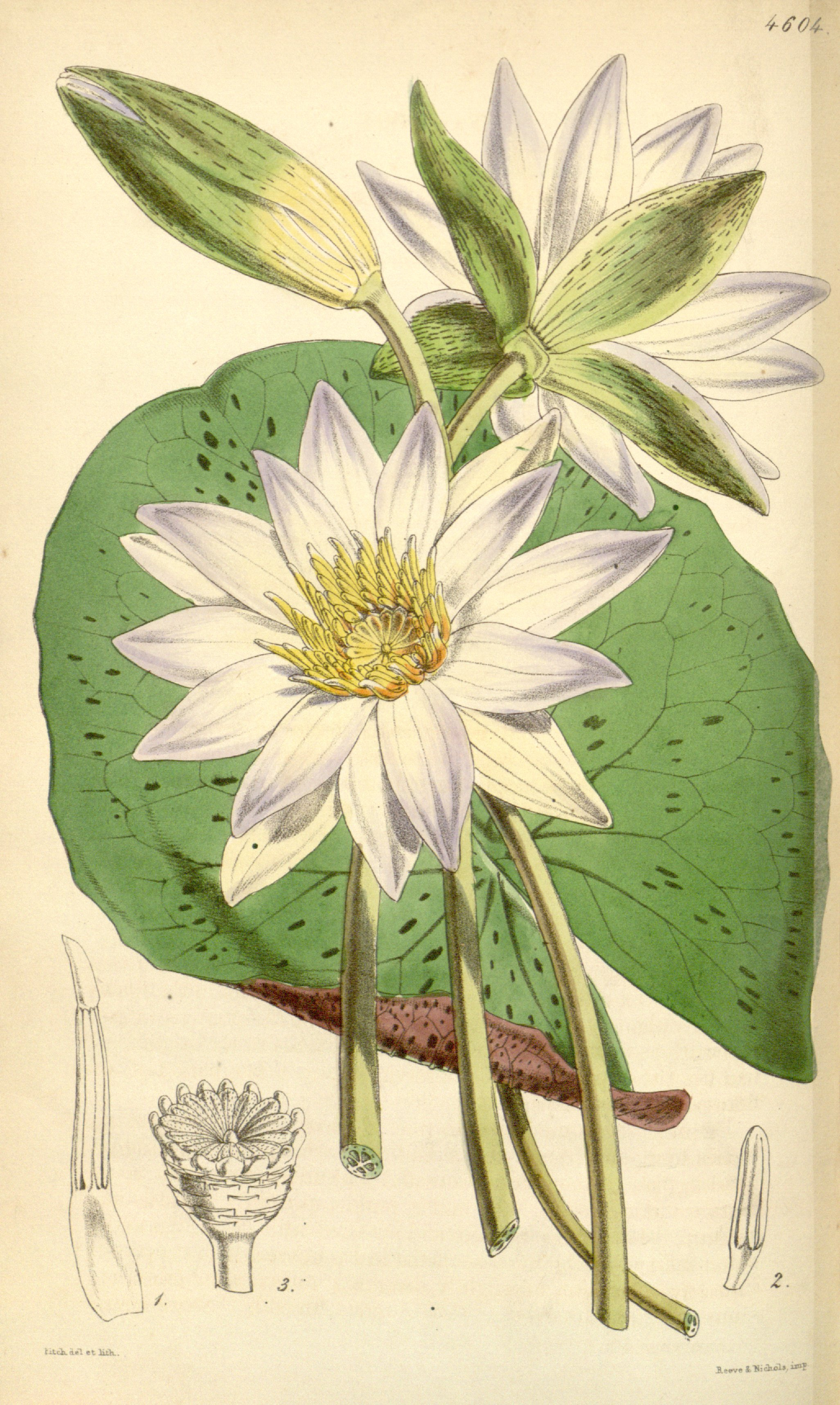
- Botanical illustration of Nymphaea elegans

Scientific classification
- Kingdom: Plantae
- Clade: Tracheophytes
- Clade: Angiosperms
- Order: Nymphaeales
- Family: Nymphaeaceae
- Genus: Nymphaea
- Subgenus: Nymphaea subg. Brachyceras (Casp) Conard

Type species
- Nymphaea stellata Willd.

Species
- See text

= Nymphaea subg. Brachyceras =

Subgenus of flowering plants

Nymphaea subg. Brachyceras is a subgenus of the genus Nymphaea.

== Description ==
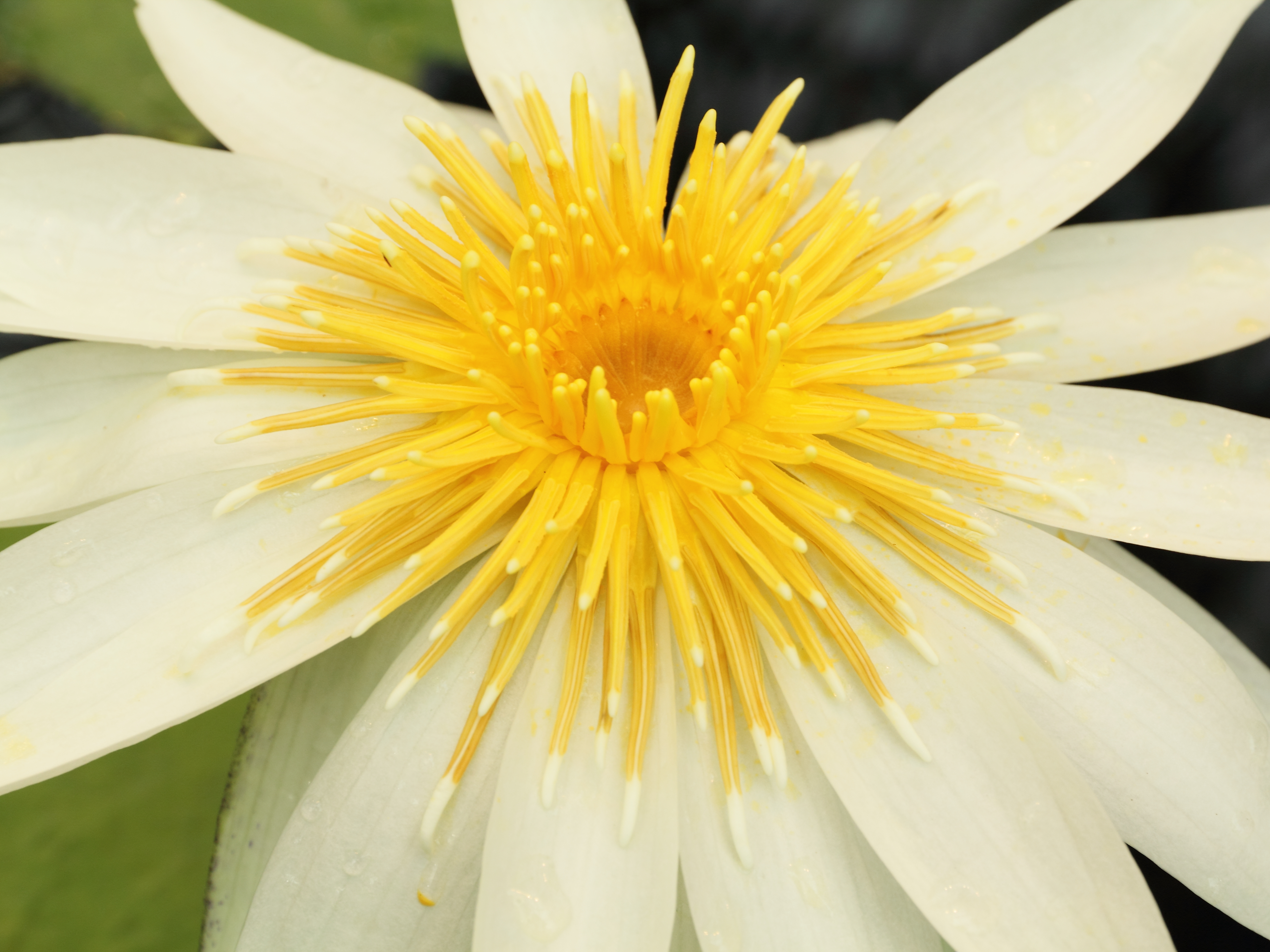
Stamens of Nymphaea ampla with characteristic sterile appendages at the apex

=== Vegetative characteristics ===
The rhizome is ovate to oblong. The rhizome is not stoloniferous.

=== Generative characteristics ===
The white, pink, purple, or cyan, diurnal flowers extend above the water surface. The stamens have an apical, conspicuous, sterile appendage. The styles are thick and fleshy. Sepals are persistent on the fruit. The small seeds are ellipsoid to subglobose.

== Taxonomy ==
It was published as Nymphaea subsect. Brachyceras Casp. by Robert Caspary in 1866. Later, it was elevated to the subgenus Nymphaea subg. Brachyceras (Casp.) Conard published by Henry Shoemaker Conard in 1905. The type species is Nymphaea stellata Willd.

=== Etymology ===
The subgeneric name Brachyceras from the Greek brachys meaning 'short', and keras meaning 'horn', means short-horned.

=== Species ===
- Nymphaea abhayana A.Chowdhury & M.Chowdhury
- Nymphaea ampla (Salisb.) DC.
- Nymphaea × daubenyana W.T.Baxter ex Daubeny
- Nymphaea dimorpha I.M.Turner
- Nymphaea divaricata Hutch.
- Nymphaea elegans Hook.
- Nymphaea gracilis Zucc.
- Nymphaea guineensis Schumach. & Thonn.
- Nymphaea heudelotii Planch.
- Nymphaea maculata Schumach. & Thonn.
- Nymphaea manipurensis Asharani & Biseshwori
- Nymphaea manipurensis var. versicolor Asharani & Biseshwori
- Nymphaea micrantha Guill. & Perr.
- Nymphaea nouchali Burm.f.
- Nymphaea nouchali var. caerulea (Savigny) Verdc.
- Nymphaea nouchali var. mutandaensis Verdc.
- Nymphaea nouchali var. nouchali (Autonym)
- Nymphaea nouchali var. ovalifolia (Conard) Verdc.
- Nymphaea nouchali var. versicolor (Sims) Guruge & Yakand.
- Nymphaea nouchali var. zanzibariensis (Casp.) Verdc.
- Nymphaea pulchella DC.
- Nymphaea siamensis Puripany.
- Nymphaea stuhlmannii (Engl.) Schweinf. & Gilg
- Nymphaea sulphurea Gilg
- Nymphaea thermarum Eb.Fisch.

== Distribution ==
Nymphaea subg. Brachyceras has a pantropical distribution.
