= Nymphaea siamensis =

Scientific classification
- Kingdom: Plantae
- Clade: Tracheophytes
- Clade: Angiosperms
- Order: Nymphaeales
- Family: Nymphaeaceae
- Genus: Nymphaea
- Subgenus: Nymphaea subg. Brachyceras
- Species: N. siamensis

Binomial name
- Nymphaea siamensis Puripany.
- Nymphaea siamensis is endemic to Thailand

Species of water lily

Nymphaea siamensis is a species of waterlily endemic to Thailand.

== Description ==
=== Vegetative characteristics ===
Nymphaea siamensis has ovoid, erect, 15 cm long and 5 cm wide rhizomes with oval bulblets. The broadly elliptic to ovate, 25 cm long, and 23 cm wide leaves have a subcoriaceous texture. The green adaxial surface can display reddish brown spotting. The purplish red abaxial surface features brown spotting. The brown, glabrous, 4 mm wide petioles have four primary air canals.

=== Generative characteristics ===
The sterile, 8–12 cm wide flowers float on the water surface. They are attached to reddish brown, glabrous, 6.5 mm wide peduncles with six primary central and twelve secondary peripheral air canals. The 5-8 green, elliptic-ovate, 5 cm long, and 1.5 cm wide sepals have a rounded to acute apex. The 80-90 petals display pinkish white, and green colouration. Reproductive structures are absent. The flowers are said to resemble Chrysanthemum flowers.

== Reproduction ==
=== Vegetative reproduction ===
The clonal species Nymphaea siamensis reproduces exclusively through the formation of bulblets on the rhizome, as well as occasional tubiferous flowers.

=== Generative reproduction ===
Sexual reproduction is impossible in this species. The flowers are sterile and do not produce ovaries.

== Taxonomy ==
It was first described by Puripany. in 2014.

=== Type specimen ===
The type specimen was collected by W.La-ongsri in Chiang Mai, Queen Sirikit Botanic Garden, Thailand on the 20th of August 2000.

=== Placement within Nymphaea ===
It appears to be placed in Nymphaea subgenus Brachyceras, however the absence of fertile flowers make it difficult to place.

== Etymology ==
The specific epithet siamensis refers to Siam, a former name of Thailand.

== Cultivation ==
It is easily cultivated.
