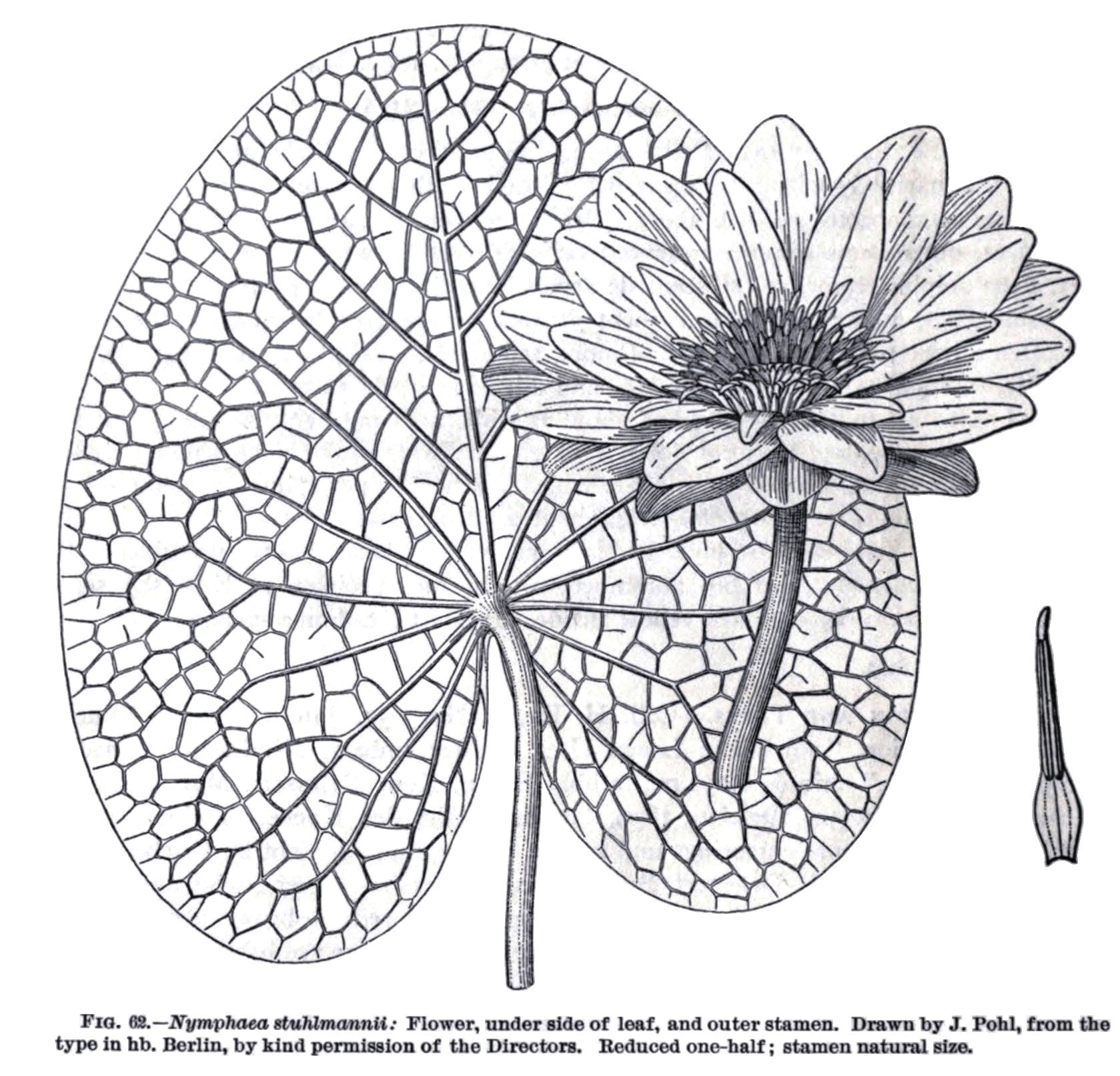
- Botanical illustration of Nymphaea stuhlmannii in the publication "The waterlilies: a monograph of the genus Nymphaea" by Henry Shoemaker Conard

Conservation status
- Endangered (IUCN 3.1)

Scientific classification
- Kingdom: Plantae
- Clade: Tracheophytes
- Clade: Angiosperms
- Order: Nymphaeales
- Family: Nymphaeaceae
- Genus: Nymphaea
- Subgenus: Nymphaea subg. Brachyceras
- Species: N. stuhlmannii

Binomial name
- Nymphaea stuhlmannii (Engl.) Schweinf. & Gilg
- Nymphaea stuhlmannii is endemic to Tanzania

Synonyms
- Nymphaea lotus var. stuhlmannii Engl.; Nymphaea burttii Pring & Woodson; Nymphaea citrina Peter; Nymphaea holoxantha Peter

= Nymphaea stuhlmannii =

Species of water lily

Nymphaea stuhlmannii is a species of waterlily endemic to Tanzania.

== Description ==
=== Vegetative characteristics ===
Nymphaea stuhlmannii is an aquatic herb with 5–12 cm long, 3–4 cm wide, globose to ovoid, blackish brown rhizomes and white, long roots. The 25.5 cm long, 21 cm wide, petiolate, ovate-orbicular leaves have an entire margin. The venation is prominent.

=== Generative characteristics ===
The fragrant flowers are 10-15 cm wide. They are yellow. The four sepals are obovate. The 22 petals are broadly obovate. The androecium consists of 125 stamens. The gynoecium consists of 23 carpels. The 3–4.5 cm long, and 4–6 cm wide fruit bears numerous ovoid 0.7–1 mm long, and 0.5–0.75 mm wide seeds.

== Taxonomy ==
=== Publication ===
It was first described by Adolf Engler as Nymphaea lotus var. stuhlmannii Engl. in 1895. Later, it was elevated to the status of a separate species Nymphaea stuhlmannii (Engl.) Schweinf. & Gilg by Georg August Schweinfurth and Ernest Friedrich Gilg in 1903.

=== Type specimen ===
The type specimen was collected by Franz Ludwig Stuhlmann (1863-1928) in Uniamweni, Gunda mkali, close to Bibisande, Africa at 1200 m above sea level on the 16th of July 1890.

== Etymology ==
The specific epithet stuhlmannii honours Stuhlmann, who collected the type specimen.

== Conservation ==
It is an endangered species (EN). It was feared to be extinct.

== Ecology ==
=== Habitat ===
Nymphaea stuhlmannii occurs in shallow pools subject to seasonal droughts at an elevation of 1140 m above sea level. The rhizomes are exposed on the surface during the dry season.
