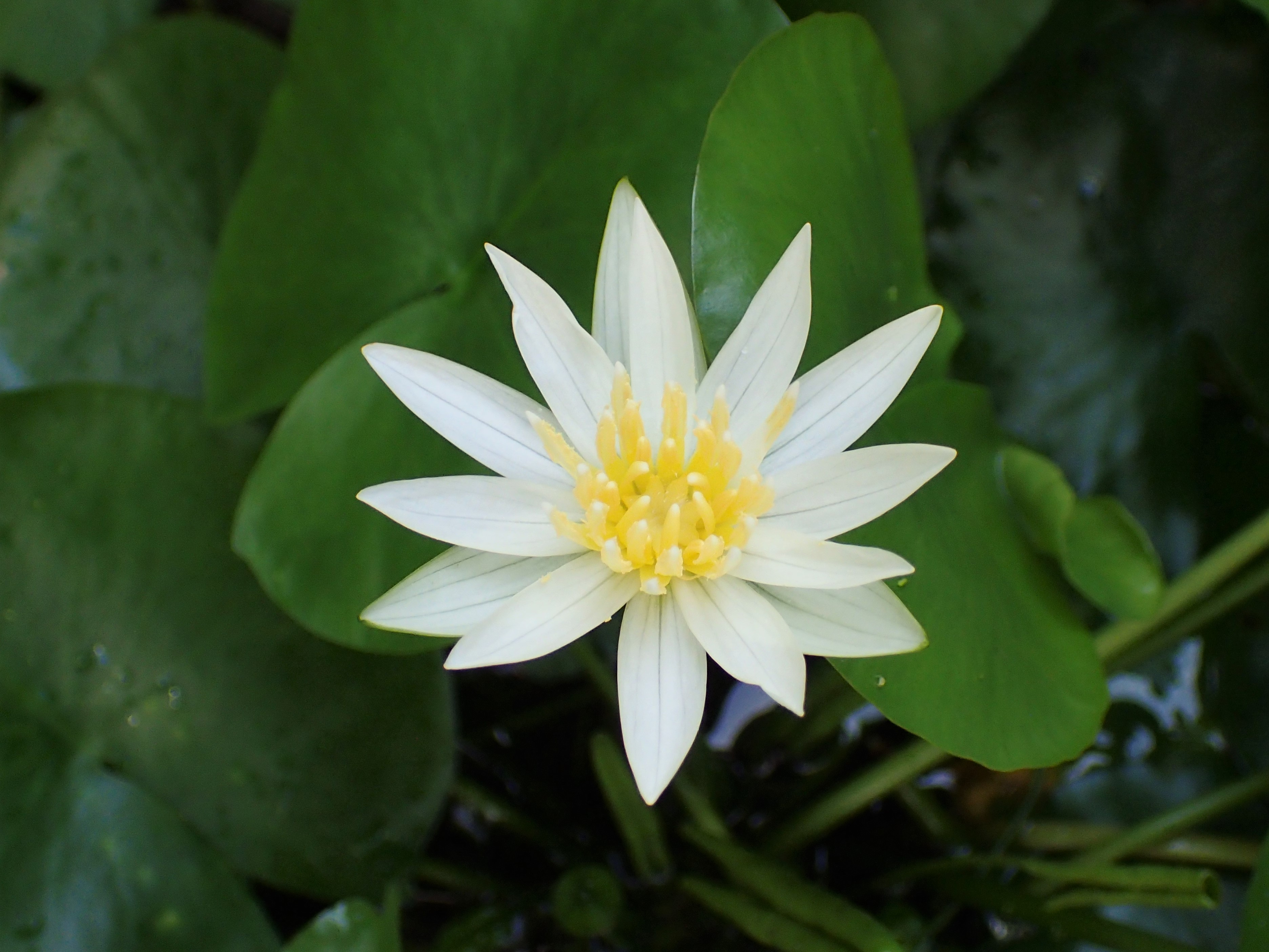
- Nymphaea heudelotii cultivated in the Botanischer Garten und Botanisches Museum Berlin

Conservation status
- Least Concern (IUCN 3.1)

Scientific classification
- Kingdom: Plantae
- Clade: Tracheophytes
- Clade: Angiosperms
- Order: Nymphaeales
- Family: Nymphaeaceae
- Genus: Nymphaea
- Subgenus: Nymphaea subg. Brachyceras
- Species: N. heudelotii

Binomial name
- Nymphaea heudelotii Planch.

Synonyms
- Nymphaea baumii Rehnelt & F.Henkel; Nymphaea erici-rosenii R.E.Fr.; Nymphaea heudelotii var. nana Conard; Nymphaea pseudopygmaea Lehm.

= Nymphaea heudelotii =

Species of water lily

Nymphaea heudelotii is a species of waterlily native to the region spanning from tropical West Africa to Uganda and Botswana.

== Description ==
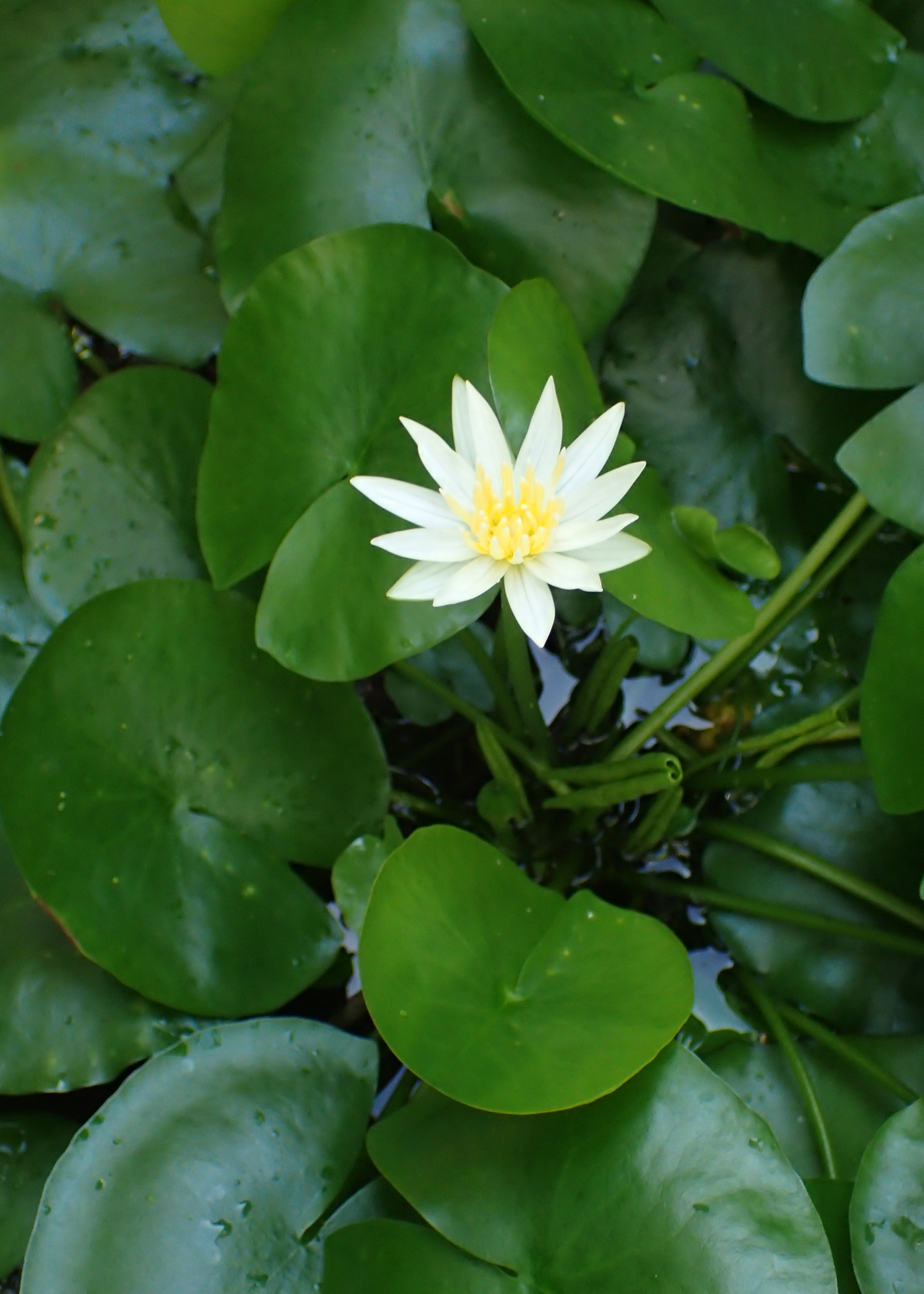
Flowering Nymphaea heudelotii specimen cultivated in the Botanischer Garten und Botanisches Museum Berlin

=== Vegetative characteristics ===
Nymphaea heudelotii is a relatively small, delicate herb with 1(–2) cm wide rhizomes. The ovoid to round leaves with an entire margin display reddish colouration on the adaxial surface, as well as red colouration with purple spotting on the abaxial surface. The lobes of the leaf have a rounded apex. The petioles is 20 cm long and slim.

=== Generative characteristics ===
The small blue to white flowers are 3-5 cm wide. The peduncle is 30 cm long and holds the flowers 5 cm above the water surface. The gynoecium consists of 4-10 carpels. The globose fruit bears elliptic-globose, smooth seeds. The flowers have a very sweet fragrance.

== Cytology ==
The chromosome count is n = 14. The chloroplast genomes of Nymphaea thermarum and Nymphaea heudelotii are identical.

== Reproduction ==
=== Vegetative reproduction ===
Nymphaea heudelotii has been reported to be viviparous starting from its second year of growth.

== Taxonomy ==
=== Publication ===
It was first described by Jules Émile Planchon in 1853.

=== Type specimen ===
The type specimen was collected by M. Heudelot in Senegal in 1837. It is part of the collection of the National Museum of Natural History, France.

== Conservation ==
The IUCN conservation status of Nymphaea heudelotii is Least Concern (LC).

== Ecology ==
=== Habitat ===
It occurs in small lakes, rivers, wet grass savannahs, riparian forests, and in shallow flowing streams. In shallow ponds within the seasonally wet savanna of Gabon, it occurs sympatrically with Websteria confervoides, Nymphoides forbesiana, Eriocaulon nadjae, and Utricularia benjaminiana. Additionally, at elevations between 1120 and 1200 meters above sea level, this species can be found in small pools within Sphagnum bogs and channels within Papyrus associations close to open water.
