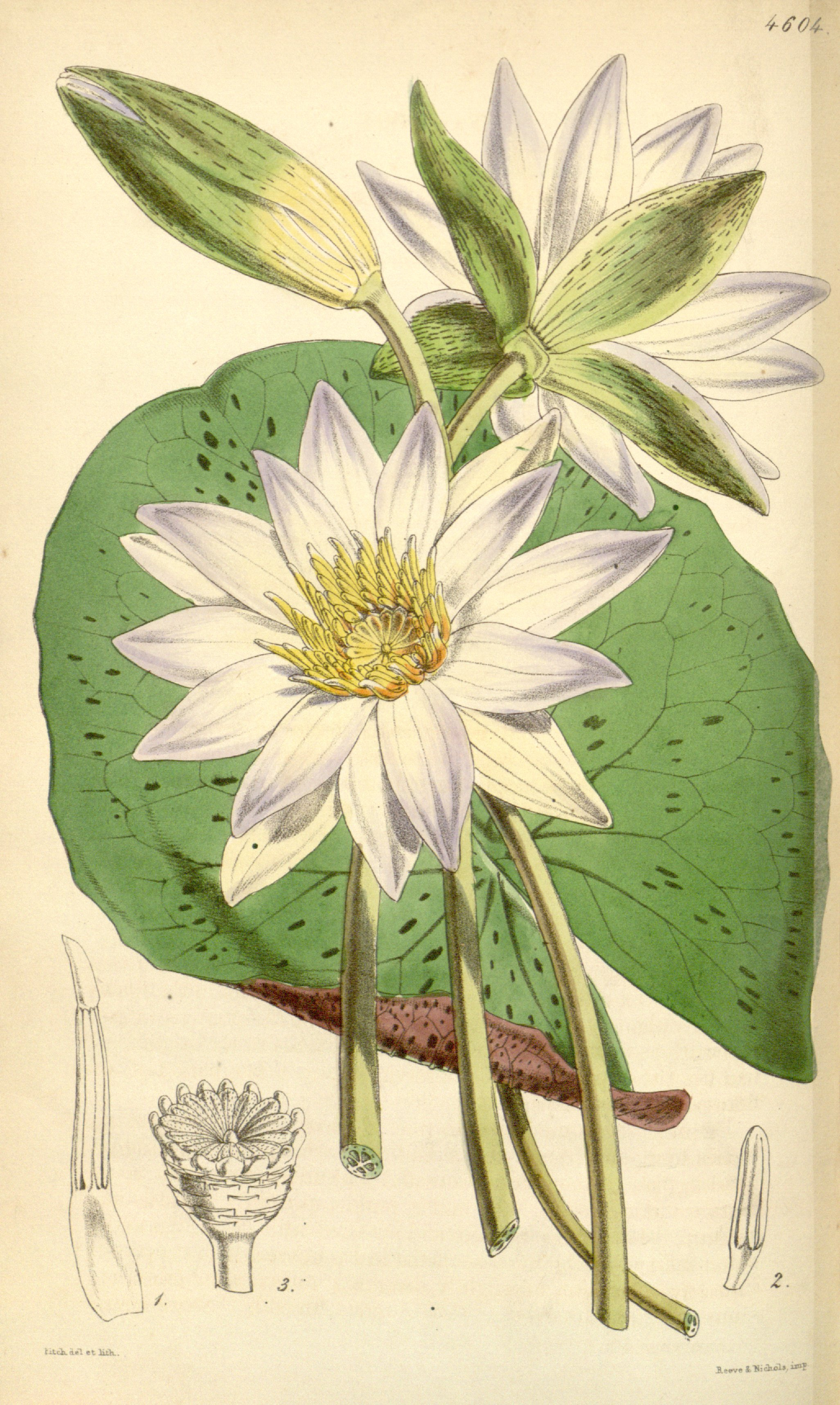

Scientific classification
- Kingdom: Plantae
- Clade: Tracheophytes
- Clade: Angiosperms
- Order: Nymphaeales
- Family: Nymphaeaceae
- Genus: Nymphaea
- Subgenus: Nymphaea subg. Brachyceras
- Species: N. elegans

Binomial name
- Nymphaea elegans Hook., 1851

Synonyms
- Castalia elegans (Hook.) Greene 1888; Leuconymphaea elegans (Hook.) Kuntze 1891; Nymphaea mexicana A.Gray 1852

= Nymphaea elegans =

Species of water lily

Nymphaea elegans, also known as the tropical royalblue waterlily, is a species of aquatic plants in the family Nymphaeaceae. It is native to the United States (Louisiana, Florida and Texas), Mexico, and the Bahamas. It has been introduced to Colombia. Additionally, it has been reported to occur in Argentina.

== Description ==
This species has unbranched rhizomes, which do not produce stolons. The petiole does not have any trichomes. The upper leaf surface is green, the submerged side of the leaf is purple.

== Reproduction ==
The fragrant flowers are protogynous. During the first day of flowering they are functionally female. In the following two days, they are functionally male.

== Taxonomy ==
=== Type specimen ===
The type specimen was collected from a pond near the head of Leona River in 1849 by Charles Wright in Texas, USA.

== Etymology ==
The specific epithet elegans means fine, elegant, or handsome.

== Ecology ==
=== Herbivory ===
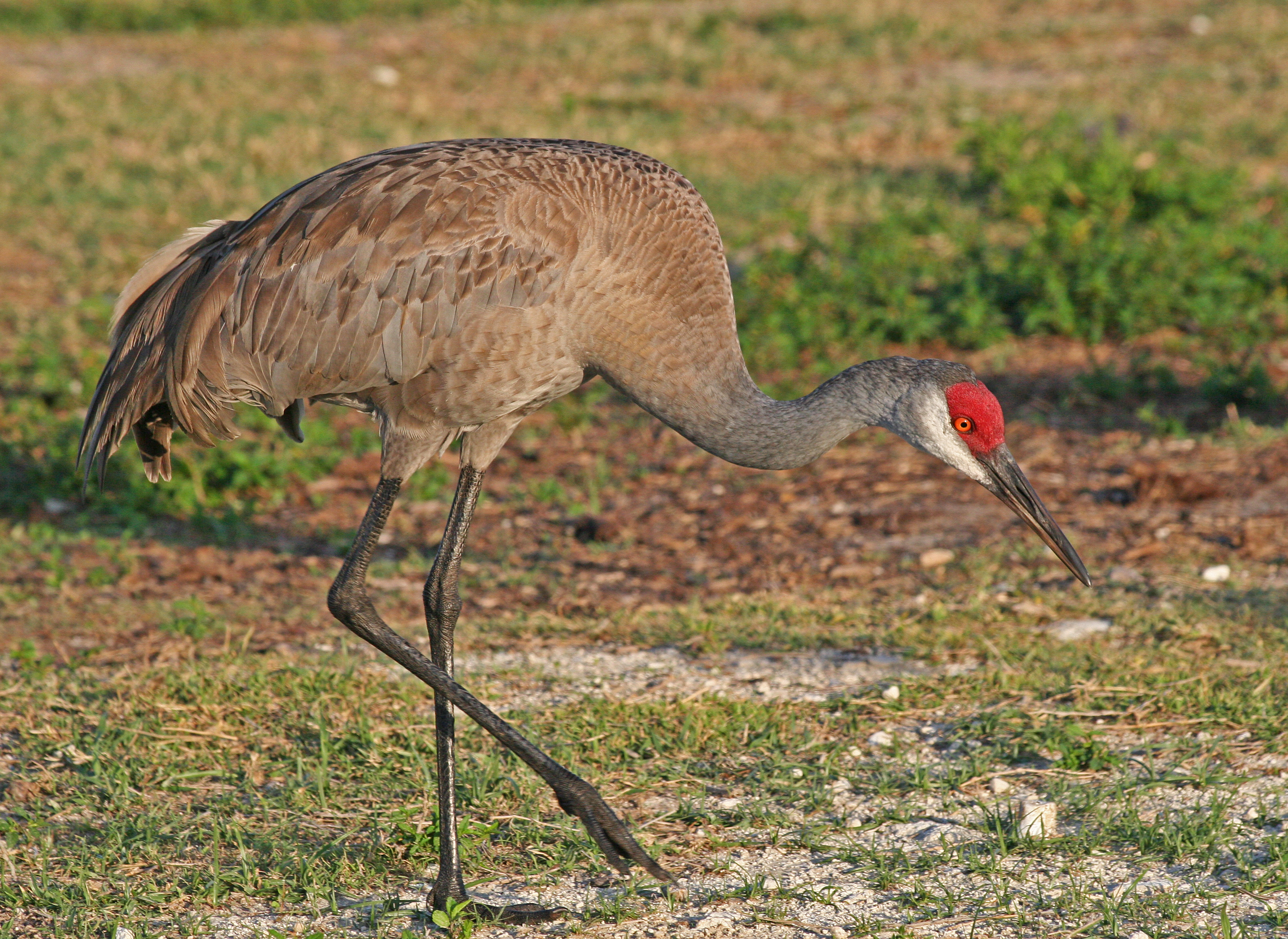
Nymphaea elegans is a food source of sandhill cranes in Texas, USA

Nymphaea elegans has been reported to be an important food plant of sandhill cranes in Texas, USA. It makes up 8.7% of their diet's volume.

== Uses ==
It finds use as a medicine and for food.
