= Nymphaea manipurensis =

Scientific classification
- Kingdom: Plantae
- Clade: Tracheophytes
- Clade: Angiosperms
- Order: Nymphaeales
- Family: Nymphaeaceae
- Genus: Nymphaea
- Subgenus: Nymphaea subg. Brachyceras
- Species: N. manipurensis

Binomial name
- Nymphaea manipurensis Asharani & Biseshwori

Varieties
- Nymphaea manipurensis var. manipurensis; Nymphaea manipurensis var. versicolor Asharani & Biseshwori
- Nymphaea manipurensis is endemic to Assam, India

Species of water lily

Nymphaea manipurensis is a species of waterlily endemic to Assam, India.

== Description ==
=== Vegetative characteristics ===
Nymphaea manipurensis is an annual, aquatic herb with 4–8 cm big rhizomes. The glabrous, elliptic-orbicular, petiolate, 11–25 cm long, and 10–24 cm wide leaves have an undulate margin. The adaxial leaf surface is green, and the abaxial leaf surface is purplish brown.

=== Generative characteristics ===
The white, 4–5 cm wide flowers float on the water surface. The tetragonous receptacle is glabrous. The brown to green peduncle is glabrous. The sepals have a thick, leathery texture. The 4–7 petals are white. The androecium consists of 21–34 stamens. The gynoecium consists of 12–14 carpels. The globose, 2.5 cm wide fruit with persistent sepals bears brown, ellipsoidal, 16–18 mm long, and 10–12 mm wide seeds.

== Taxonomy ==
It was first described by Sagolsem Asharani Devi and Thongam Biseshwori in 2014. The type specimen was collected by S. Asharani in Manipur, India on the 19th of July 2011. It is placed in the subgenus Nymphaea subg. Brachyceras.

=== Varieties ===
It has two varieties:

- Nymphaea manipurensis var. manipurensis
- Nymphaea manipurensis var. versicolor Asharani & Biseshwori

=== Etymology ===
The specific epithet manipurensis is derived from Manipur, India.
