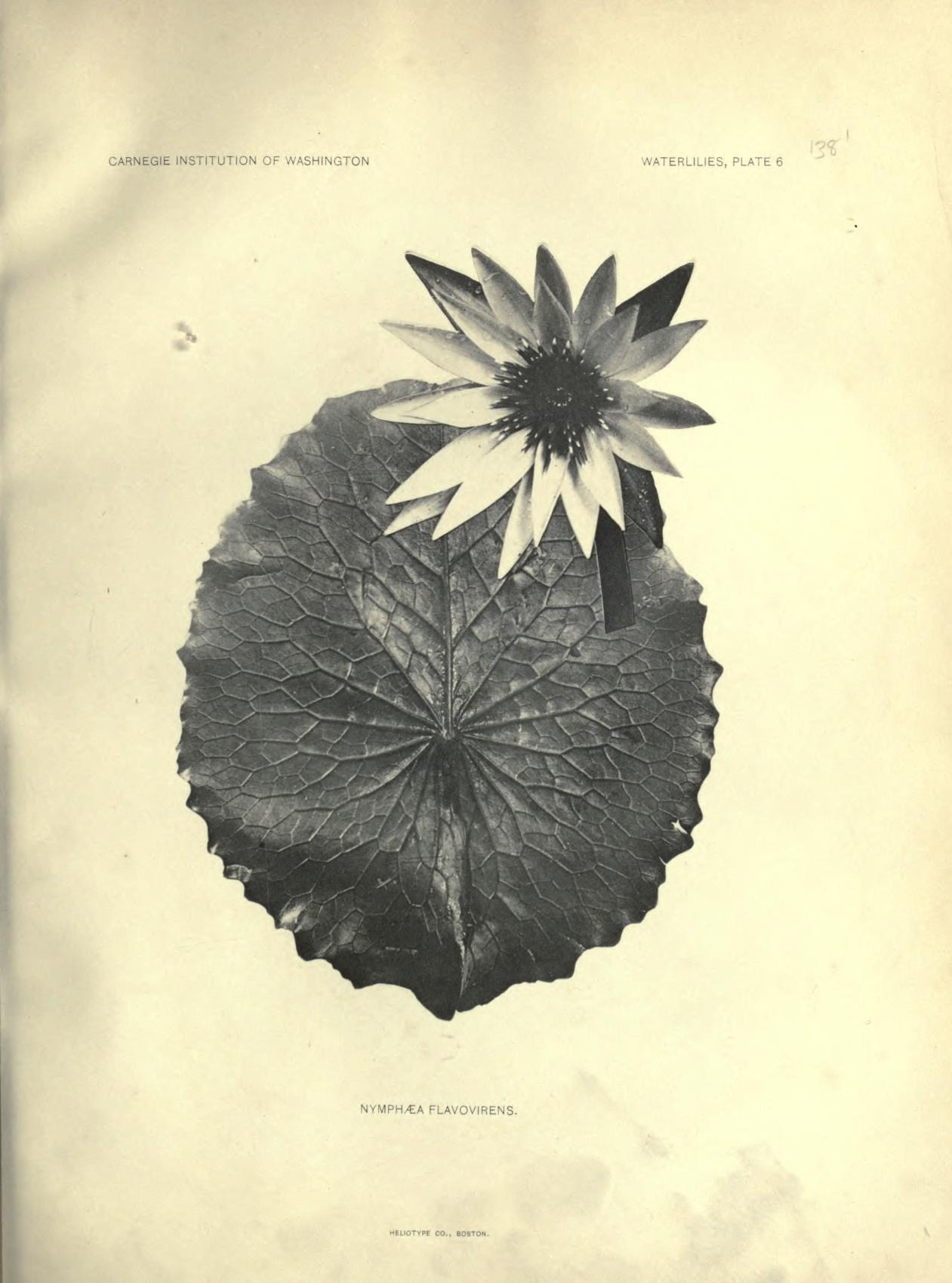
- Nymphaea gracilis as Nymphaea flavovirens

Scientific classification
- Kingdom: Plantae
- Clade: Tracheophytes
- Clade: Angiosperms
- Order: Nymphaeales
- Family: Nymphaeaceae
- Genus: Nymphaea
- Subgenus: Nymphaea subg. Brachyceras
- Species: N. gracilis

Binomial name
- Nymphaea gracilis Zucc.
- Nymphaea gracilis is endemic to Mexico

Synonyms
- Castalia gracilis (Zucc.) Rose; Leuconymphaea gracilis (Zucc.) Kuntze; Castalia flavovirens (Lehm.) Knowlt.; Leuconymphaea tussilagifolia (Lehm.) Kuntze; Leuconymphaea undulata (Lehm.) Kuntze; Nymphaea flavovirens Lehm.; Nymphaea tussilagifolia Lehm.; Nymphaea undulata Lehm.

= Nymphaea gracilis =

Species of water lily

Nymphaea gracilis is a species of waterlily endemic to Mexico. It is the only species of its genus which is endemic to Mexico.

== Description ==
=== Vegetative characteristics ===
Nymphaea gracilis has very short, subglobose rhizomes densely covered with fibrous roots. The petiolate, glabrous, orbicular floating leaves with dentate margins are 35–40 cm long, and 28–35 cm wide. The adaxial leaf surface is bright green, and the abaxial leaf surface is suffused with purple colouration. The terete, 1.2 cm wide petiole is 60–150 cm long.

=== Generative characteristics ===
The flowers are 8–10 cm wide, and extend up to 20–40 cm above the water surface. They have four lanceolate, green sepals and 18-20 white sepals. The androecium consists of 60 stamens. The gynoecium consists of 12-15 carpels. The globose 2–3.5 cm wide fruit bears arillate seeds with a reticulate testa, and trichomes. The flowers are fragrant.

== Cytology ==
=== Generative reproduction ===
Nymphaea gracilis is facultatively xenogamous.

== Taxonomy ==
=== Publication ===
It was first described by Joseph Gerhard Zuccarini in 1832.

=== Placement within Nymphaea ===
It is placed in Nymphaea subgenus Brachyceras.

== Etymology ==
The specific epithet gracilis means thin, slender or graceful.

== Conservation ==
It is considered to be in danger of extinction.

== Ecology ==
=== Habitat ===
It grows in canals, swamps, shallow ponds, dams, and lakes.

=== Pollination ===
The three most important pollinators of Nymphaea gracilis

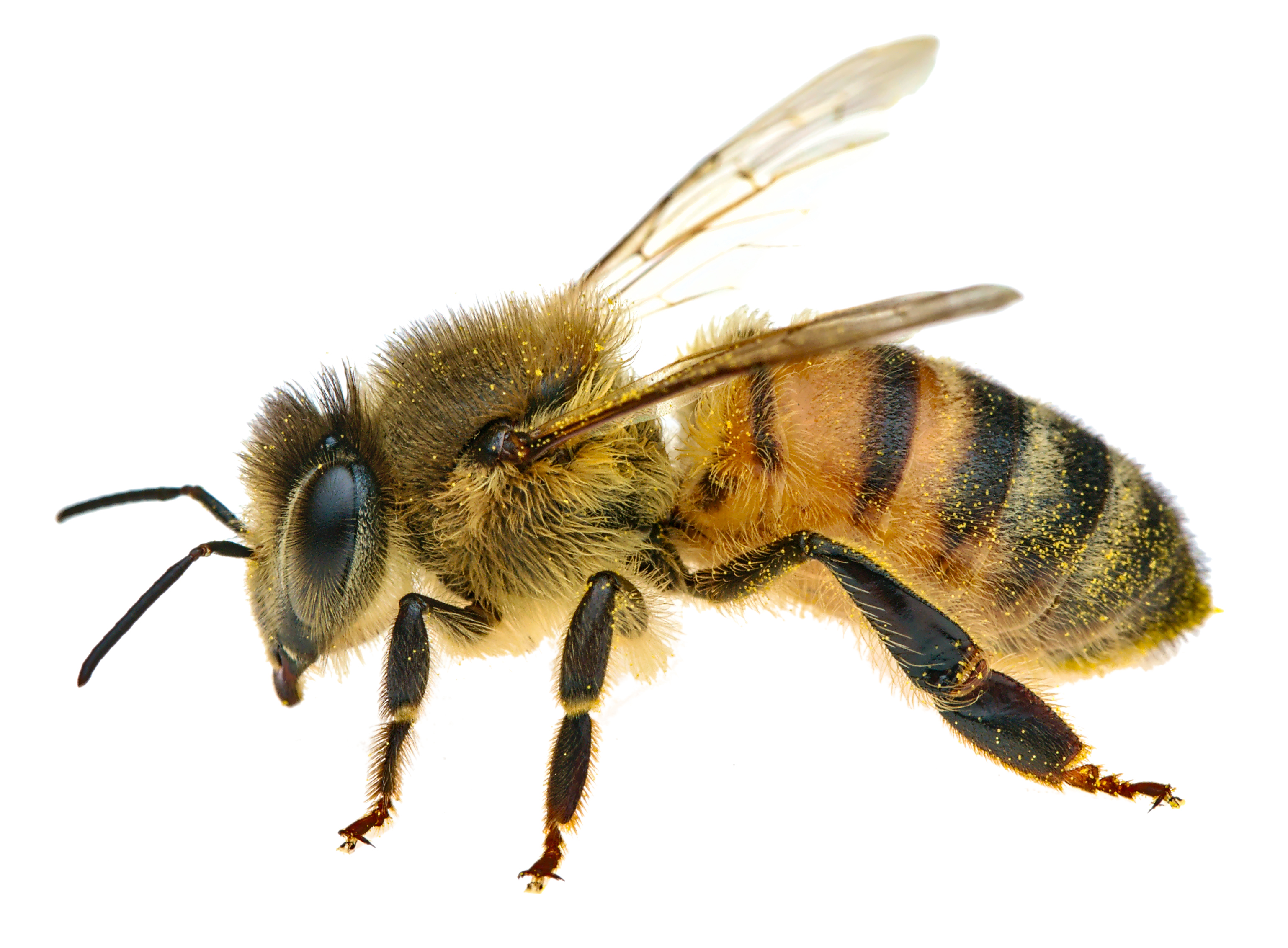
Apis mellifera

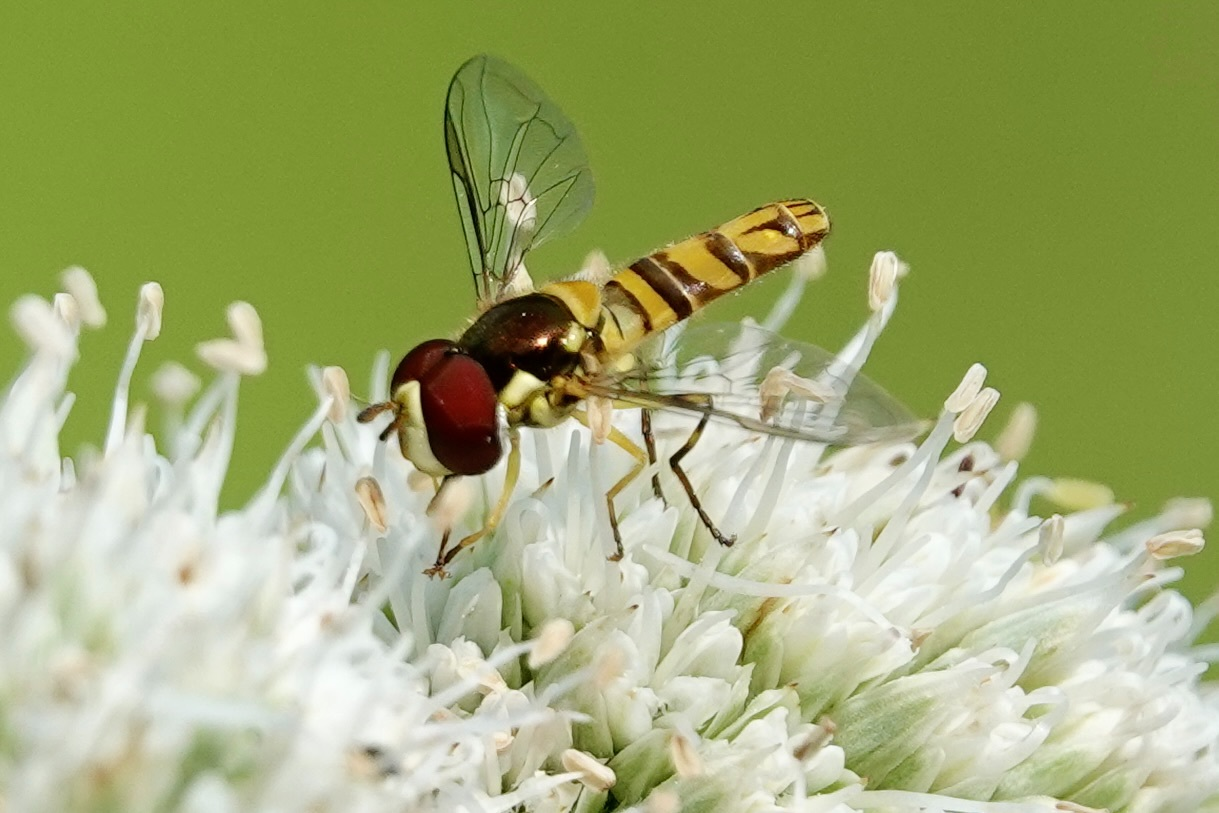
Allograpta obliqua

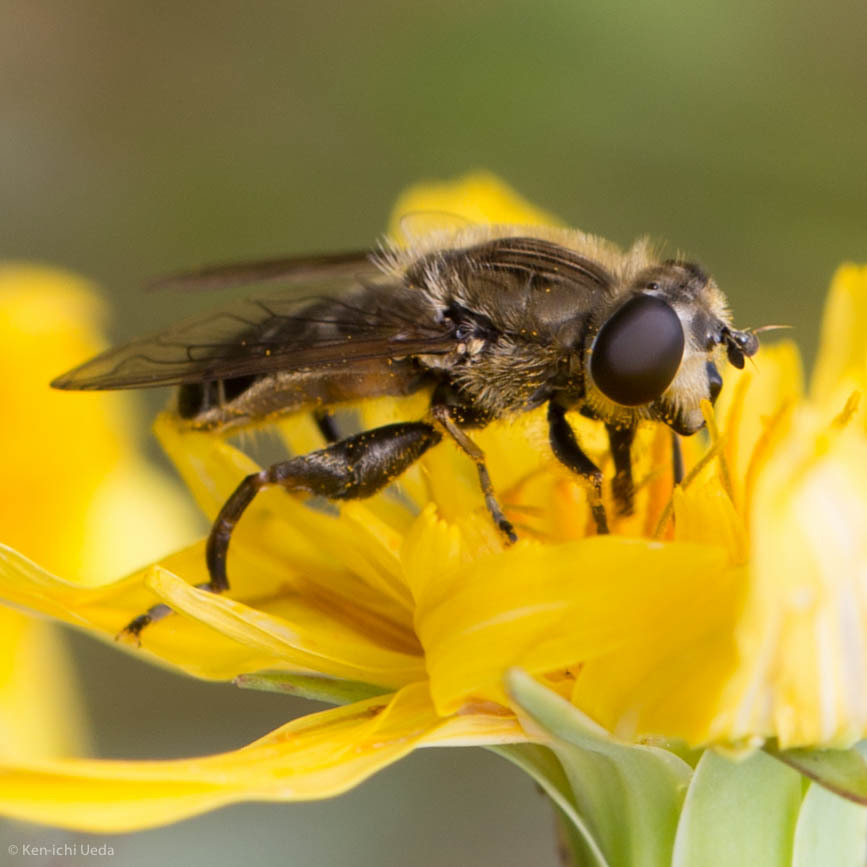
A member of the genus Asemosyrphus (Asemosyrphus polygrammus)

The flowers attract flies and bees. The bee species Apis mellifera is the most important pollinator of Nymphaea gracilis, followed by the fly species Allograpta obliqua, and Asemosyrphus sp.

== Use ==
The rhizomes are eaten both by humans and livestock.

== Cultivation ==
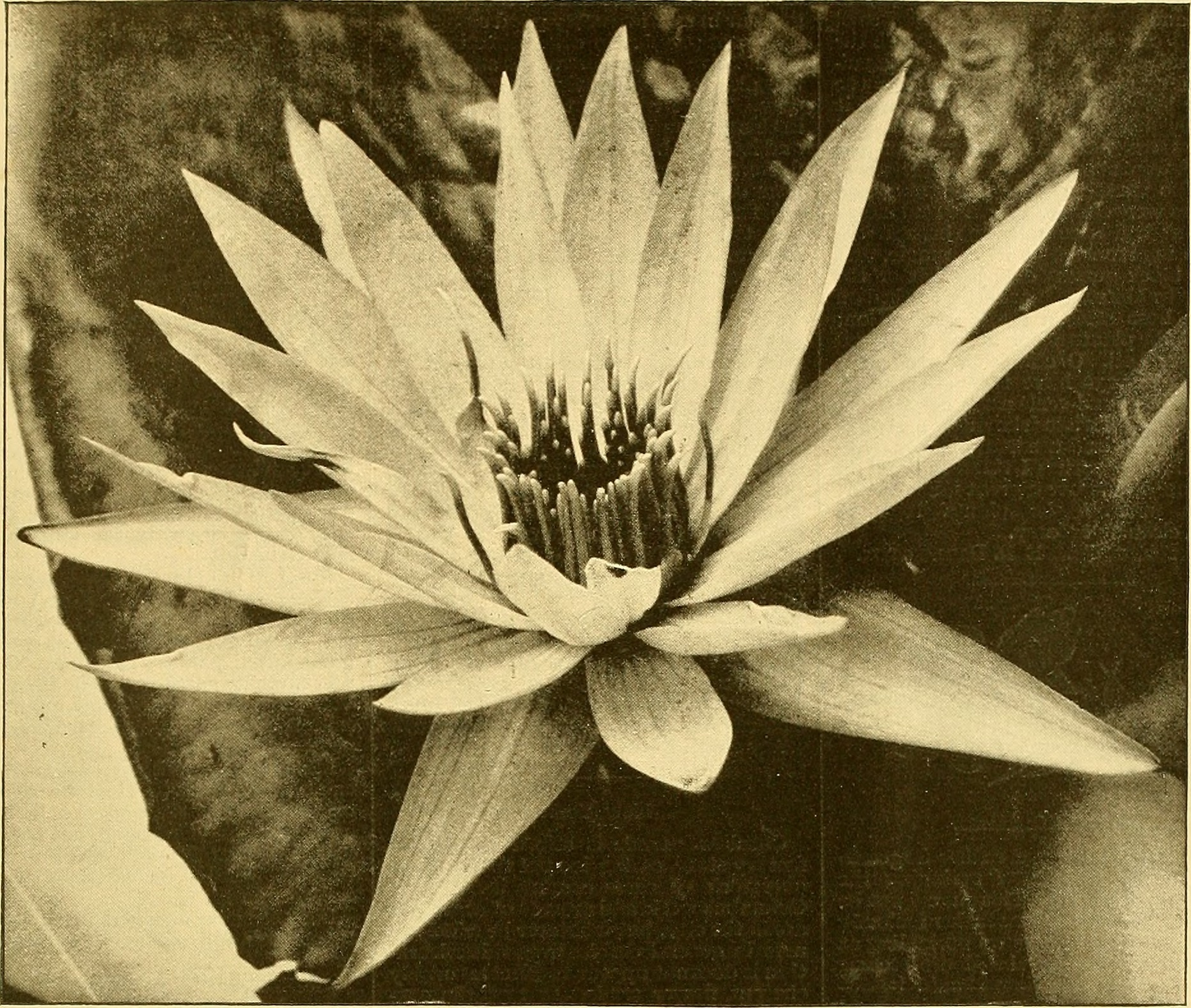
Flower of a hybrid of Nymphaea nouchali var. caerulea and Nymphaea gracilis

It has been used in artificial hybridisation to create new waterlily cultivars.
