= Nymphaea manipurensis var. versicolor =

Scientific classification
- Kingdom: Plantae
- Clade: Tracheophytes
- Clade: Angiosperms
- Order: Nymphaeales
- Family: Nymphaeaceae
- Genus: Nymphaea
- Species: N. manipurensis
- Variety: N. m. var. versicolor

Trinomial name
- Nymphaea manipurensis var. versicolor Asharani & Biseshwori

Species of aquatic plant

Nymphaea manipurensis var. versicolor is a variety of the water lily species Nymphaea manipurensis endemic to Manipur, India.

== Description ==
=== Vegetative characteristics ===
Nymphaea manipurensis var. versicolor is a rhizomatous plant with 6–10 cm big rhizomes. The petiolate, thick, elliptic to suborbicular leaf with an undulate margin and a 12 cm deep sinus is 15–35 cm long, and 13–32 cm wide. The brown petiole is 50–100 cm long.

=== Generative characteristics ===
The creamy white, 5–8 cm wide flowers with a tetragonus receptacle float on the water surface. The mottled green, coriaceous, thick, 5.5–8.5 cm long, and 4.0–5.0 cm wide sepals displays streaked patterns on the abaxial side. The flower has 6–9 petals. The androecium consists of 31–36 stamens. The gynoecium consists of 15–20 carpels.

== Taxonomy ==
It was described by Sagolsem Asharani Devi and Biseshwori Thongam in 2014. The type specimen was collected by S. Asharani in Imphal East district, Manipur, India on the 8th of September 2011. It is placed in the subgenus Nymphaea subg. Brachyceras. Some sources treat it as a synonym of Nymphaea nouchali var. versicolor.

=== Etymology ===
The varietal name versicolor means variously coloured and refers to the streaked abaxial side of the sepals.

== Ecology ==
It occurs in wetland areas.
