= Nymphaea divaricata =

Conservation status
- Data Deficient (IUCN 3.1)

Scientific classification
- Kingdom: Plantae
- Clade: Tracheophytes
- Clade: Angiosperms
- Order: Nymphaeales
- Family: Nymphaeaceae
- Genus: Nymphaea
- Subgenus: Nymphaea subg. Brachyceras
- Species: N. divaricata

Binomial name
- Nymphaea divaricata Hutch.

Species of water lily

Nymphaea divaricata is a species of waterlily native to Angola, Zambia, and the Democratic Republic of the Congo.

== Description ==
=== Vegetative characteristics ===
The elongate rhizome is 1-2 cm wide. The leaves are 8-24 cm long. The foliage of Nymphaea divaricata is distinctive in that it predominantly consists of submerged leaves, with floating leaves being a rare occurrence. The leaves are divaricately lobed.

=== Generative characteristics ===
The yellow, pink or blue, floating to slightly emerging flowers are 4-10 cm wide. The four acute, lanceolate or ovate-oblong sepals are 2.6–4.5 cm long and 0.8–1.2 cm wide. The 12–15 acute, lanceolate, or obtuse petals are as long as the sepals. The androecium consists of 20–30 stamens with acute appendages of the connective. The gynoecium consists of 12–18 carpels with short styles.

== Taxonomy ==
It was first described by John Hutchinson in 1931.

== Etymology ==
The specific epithet divaricata references divaricately lobed leaves of this species.

== Conservation ==
The IUCN conservation status is Data Deficient (DD). It is a rare species.

== Ecology ==
=== Habitat ===
Nymphaea divaricata occurs in deep, slowly flowing waters, rivers, lakes, and pools. It also occurs in nutrient-poor waters. In its natural habitat, the submerged foliage forms a dense carpet.
