= Nymphaea abhayana =

Scientific classification
- Kingdom: Plantae
- Clade: Tracheophytes
- Clade: Angiosperms
- Order: Nymphaeales
- Family: Nymphaeaceae
- Genus: Nymphaea
- Subgenus: Nymphaea subg. Brachyceras
- Species: N. abhayana

Binomial name
- Nymphaea abhayana A.Chowdhury & M.Chowdhury
- Nymphaea abhayana is endemic to West Bengal, India

Species of water lily

Nymphaea abhayana is a species of waterlily endemic to India.

== Description ==
=== Vegetative characteristics ===
Nymphaea abhayana is an annual aquatic herb. The leaves are almost all submerged. The lamina is 13-15 cm long, and 16-18 cm wide. The green petioles are glabrous.

=== Generative characteristics ===
The 5-6 cm wide flowers float, but never extend above the water surface. The four 3.7-4 cm long, 0.8-1.2 cm wide sepals display prominent venation. The seven 2.9-3.5 cm long, 0.5-0.7 cm wide petals display blueish-purple colouration. The androecium consists of 13 stamens. The flowers have 6-7 stigmatic rays. The globose, 0.7-2 cm wide fruit bears globose seeds.

== Reproduction ==
=== Generative reproduction ===
Flowering and fruiting occurs from October to December.

== Taxonomy ==
=== Publication ===
It was first described by Anurag Chowdhury and Monoranjan Chowdhury in 2016.

=== Type specimen ===
The type specimen of Nymphaea abhayana was collected by Anurag et al. in Gorumara National Park, West Bengal, India, on the 16th of November 2014.

=== Placement within Nymphaea ===
It is close to Nymphaea nouchali.

== Etymology ==
The specific epithet abhayana honours Prof. Abhaya Prasad Das of the University of North Bengal and Rajiv Gandhi University.

== Conservation ==
Nymphaea abhayana has a very narrow distribution. It is a rare species.

== Ecology ==
=== Habitat ===
It occurs in ephemeral aquatic habitats, which dry up in December.
