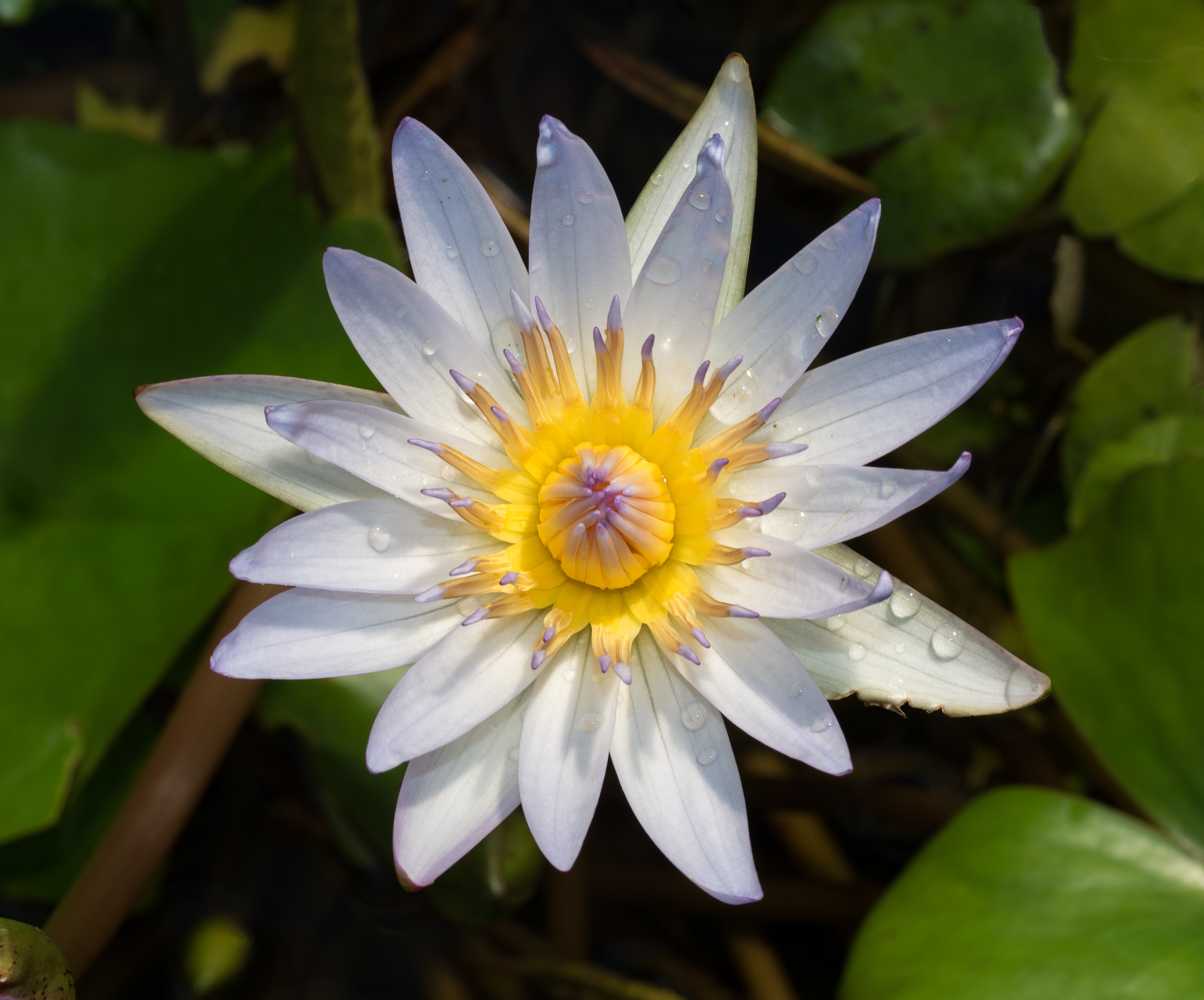
- Nymphaea × daubenyana cultivated at the Brooklyn Botanic Garden, New York, USA

Scientific classification
- Kingdom: Plantae
- Clade: Tracheophytes
- Clade: Angiosperms
- Order: Nymphaeales
- Family: Nymphaeaceae
- Genus: Nymphaea
- Subgenus: Nymphaea subg. Brachyceras
- Species: N. × daubenyana

Binomial name
- Nymphaea × daubenyana W.T.Baxter ex Daubeny
- It is endemic to Chad, but has been introduced to Florida, USA

Synonyms
- Nymphaea × daubeniana O.Thomas; Nymphaea × erangae Yakand., Guruge & K.Yakand.

= Nymphaea × daubenyana =

Species of water lily

Nymphaea × daubenyana is a species of waterlily endemic to Chad, which has also been introduced to the USA (Florida) and Sri Lanka. It is a natural hybrid of Nymphaea micrantha and Nymphaea nouchali var. caerulea.

== Description ==
Parent species of the natural hybrid
Nymphaea × daubenyana W.T.Baxter ex Daubeny

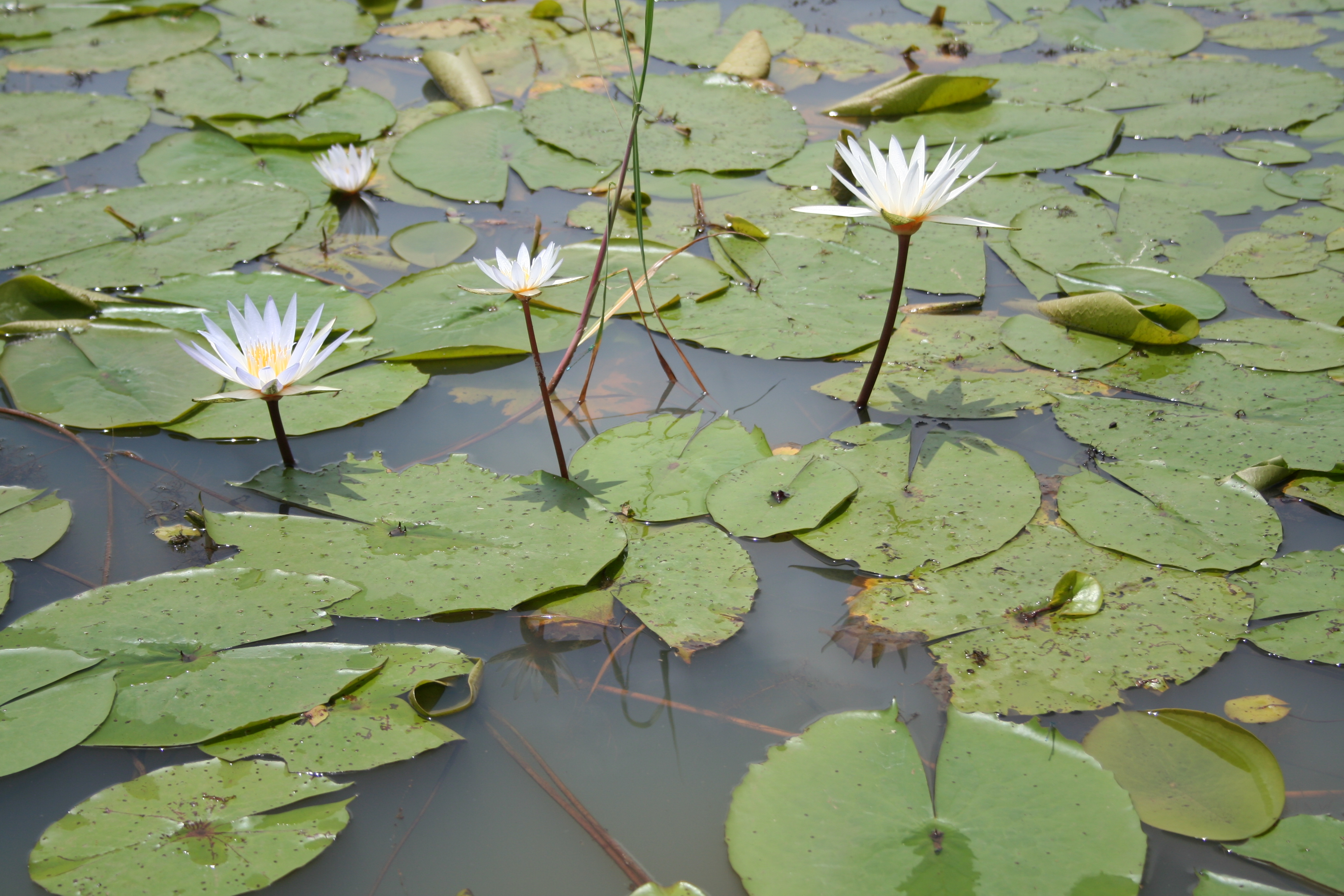
Nymphaea micrantha Guill. & Perr.

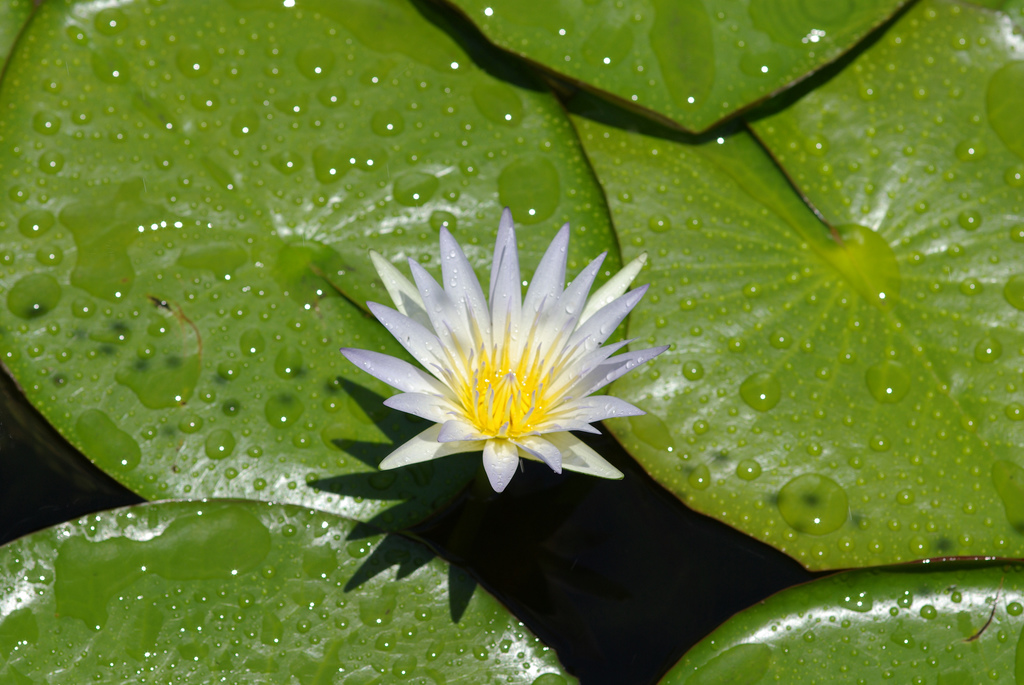
Nymphaea nouchali var. caerulea (Savigny) Verdc.

=== Vegetative characteristics ===
It has a tuberous rhizome. The cordate, elliptical-roundish, 30 cm wide leaves have an entire margin. The adaxial surface is coloured brightly green with red marks. The abaxial leaf surface is pale - brownish red. Proliferating tissue is found on the leaf blade above the attachment point of the petiole.

=== Generative characteristics ===
The blue flowers are 10 cm wide. The narrow petals have an acute apex. The ovules are bitegmic and anatropous. The flowers are fragrant.

=== Cytology ===
A chromosome count of 89 or 87 chromosomes has been reported. The diploid chromosome count has also been reported to be 2n = 42.

== Reproduction ==
Vegetative reproduction through foliar proliferation occurs in Nymphaea × daubenyana.

== Taxonomy ==
It was first named by W.T.Baxter, but only later validly published by Charles Giles Bridle Daubeny (1795-1867) in 1864. It is placed in the subgenus Nymphaea subg. Brachyceras.

=== Etymology ===
It is named after Professor Charles Giles Bridle Daubeny.

== Cultivation ==
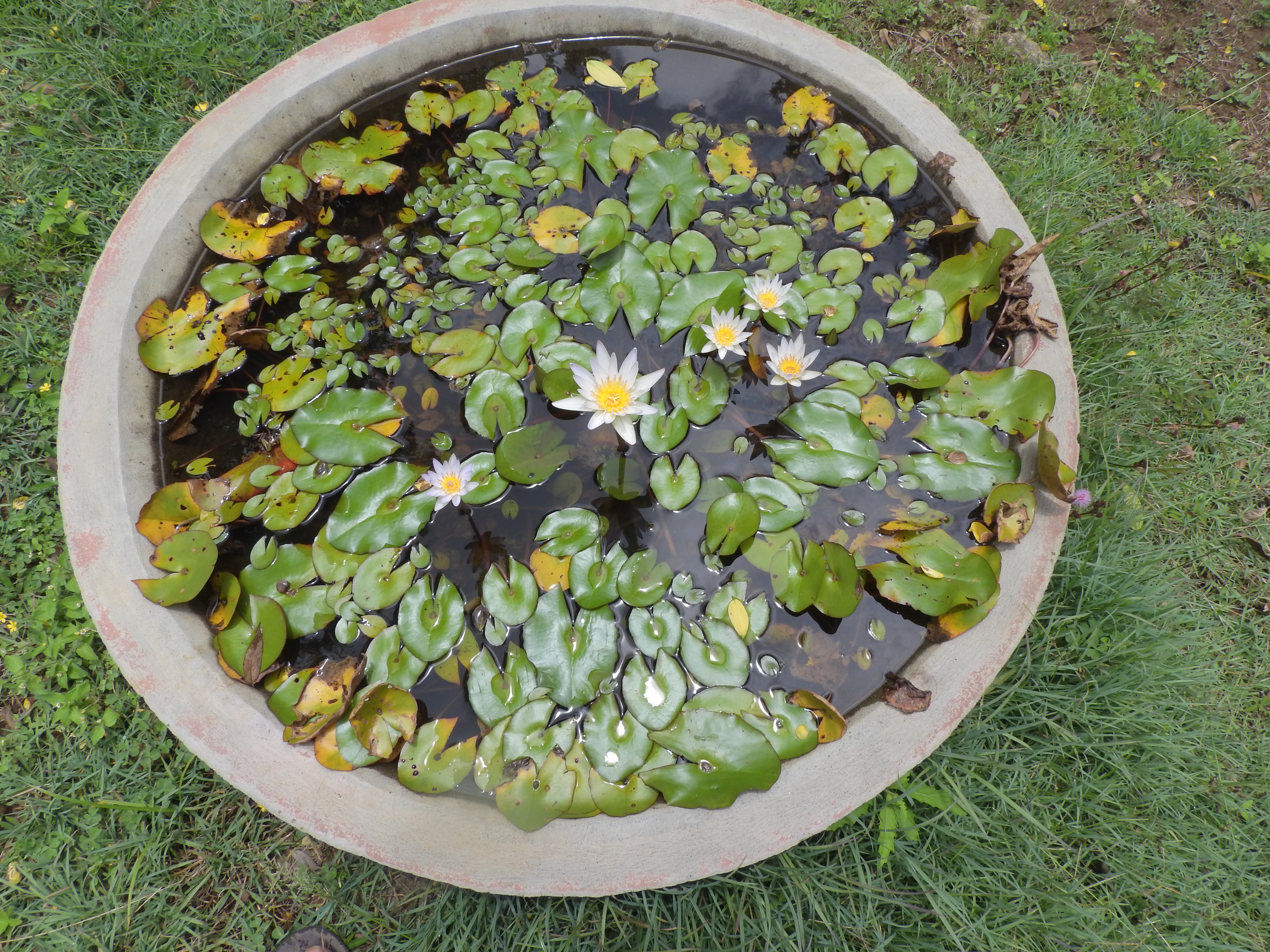
Nymphaea × daubenyana cultivated in India

It is suited for cultivation in small ponds, containers, and aquaria. It is a fast growing and floriferous species. Despite being a tropical waterlily, it is relatively cold-tolerant.
