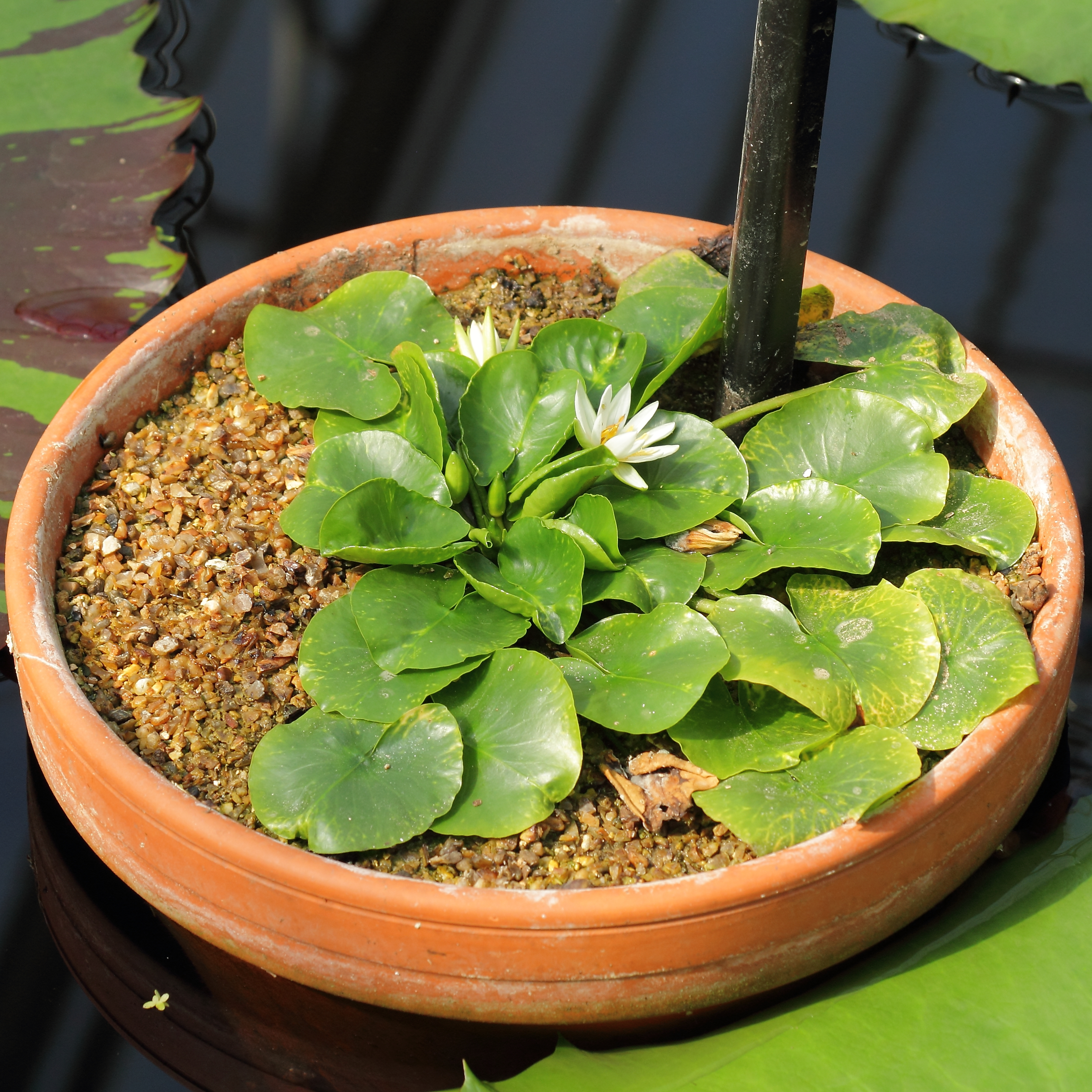

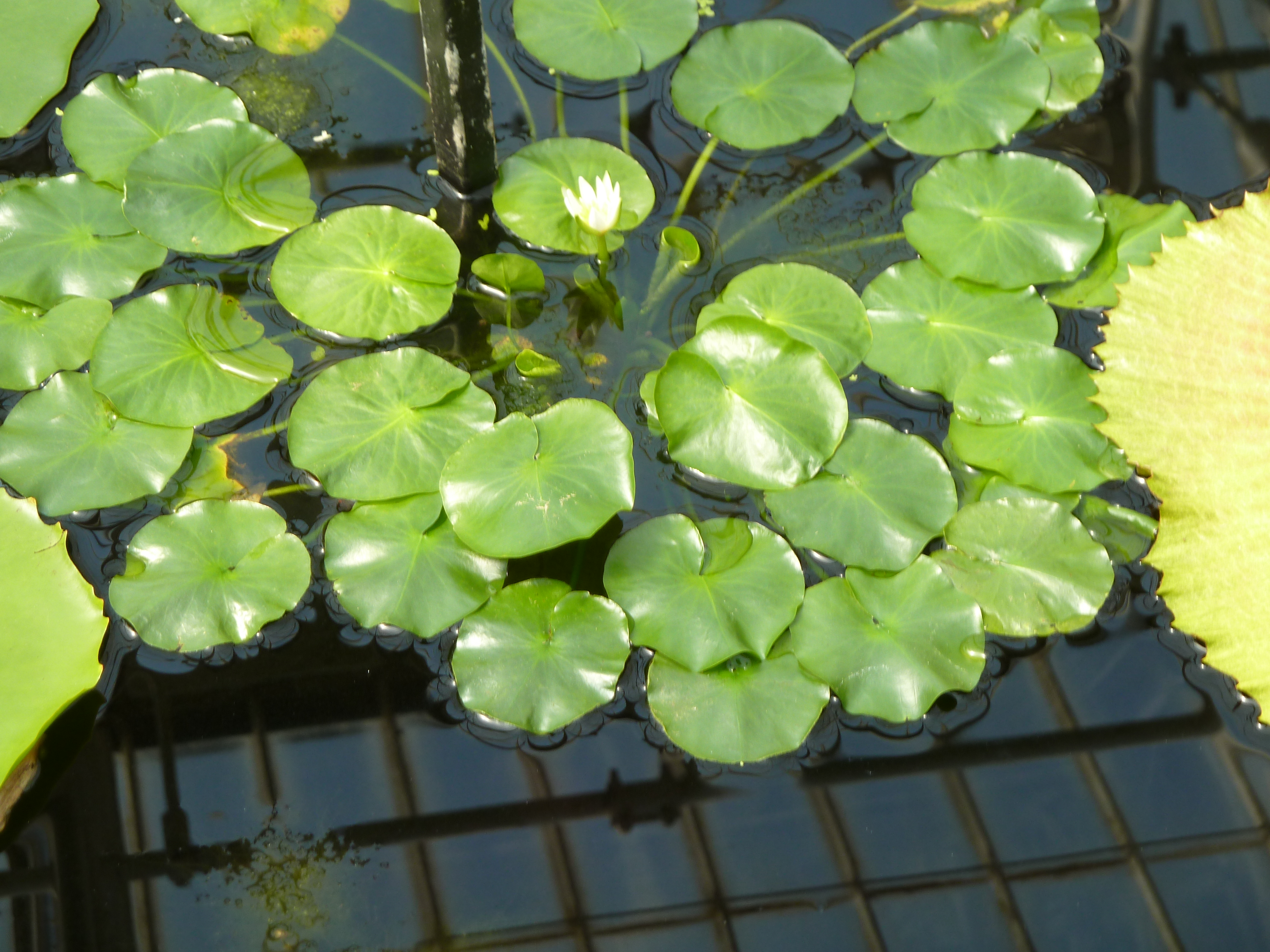

Conservation status
- Critically Endangered (IUCN 3.1)

Scientific classification
- Kingdom: Plantae
- Clade: Tracheophytes
- Clade: Angiosperms
- Order: Nymphaeales
- Family: Nymphaeaceae
- Genus: Nymphaea
- Subgenus: Nymphaea subg. Brachyceras
- Species: N. thermarum

Binomial name
- Nymphaea thermarum Eb.Fisch.
- Nymphaea thermarum is endemic to Rwanda

= Nymphaea thermarum =

Species of water lily

Nymphaea thermarum, also known as Miniature Rwandan water lily, is a species of water lily that is endemic to Rwanda. Once thought to be extinct in the wild, all wild plants were believed to be lost due to destruction of its native habitat, but it was thought to be saved from extinction when it was grown from seed at the Royal Botanic Gardens, Kew in 2009. A previously-unknown wild population was discovered in 2023.

== Description ==
=== Vegetative characteristics ===
It is a diminutive, aquatic, rhizomatous herb with 1–2(–5) cm long rhizomes. The peltate, petiolate, glabrous, orbicular to suborbicular leaves have a 2.8–3.2 cm long, and 2.5–3 cm wide lamina. The lobes of the lamina are overlapping each other, or are almost parallel. The petiole is 4–6(–8) cm long.

=== Generative characteristics ===
The up to 2 cm wide, hermaphroditic, incompletely protogynous, white flowers have 1.5–3 cm long peduncles. The four green, lanceolate sepals with a round apex are 1.7–1.8 cm long, and 0.6–0.7 cm wide. The 6–8 white petals are 1.5–1.6 cm long, and 4 mm wide. The androecium consists of up to 16 stamens with a sterile apical appendage and they gradually decrease in size from the 9–10 mm long outer stamens to the 5–6 mm long inner stamens. The filament is up to 5–6 mm long, likewise, the connective is 5–6 mm long, and the anthers are 1.5–4 mm long. The gynoecium consists of 7–9 basally fused, 4–5 mm long carpels with a 2mm long, and 1 mm wide stigma forming a stigmatic disk. The up to 1.2–1.5 cm wide fruit bears hundreds of bright red to brown, arillate seeds.

== Cytology ==
The diploid chromosome count is 2n = 28. The genome size is 498.78 Mb. The chloroplast genomes of Nymphaea thermarum and Nymphaea heudelotii are identical.

== Taxonomy ==
Nymphaea thermarum was published by the German botanist Eberhard Fischer in 1988. The type specimen was collected by Fischer in hot springs South of Nyakabuye, Rwanda on the 25th of April 1987. It is placed within the subgenus Nymphaea subg. Brachyceras.

== Etymology ==
The specific epithet thermarum refers to the hot spring and temperature that provided its native habitat.

== Breeding ==
They can self-pollinate, and after blooming the flower stalk bends so the fruit contacts the mud. The fruit contains 300 to 400 seeds. The sepals are slightly hairy, and as large as the flower's petals. The plant is a tropical day bloomer displaying protogynous flowering patterns, opening early in the morning on the first day with female floral functioning, closing in early afternoon, and opening on the second day with male functionality. It is in the Nymphaea subgenus Brachyceras, though the leaves are more typical of the subgenus Nymphaea. It apparently does not form tubers. Seeds are large for plants in subgenus Brachyceras. The lifespan of Nymphaea thermarum can be greater than 10 years.

== Conservation ==
The plant's native habitat was damp mud formed by the overflow of a freshwater hot spring in Mashyuza, southwest Rwanda. It was thought to have become extinct in the wild around 2008, when local farmers began using the spring for agriculture. The farmers cut off the flow of the spring, which dried up the tiny area—just a few square metres—that was believed to be the entire habitat. Before the extinction of the first known population, Fischer sent some specimens to Bonn Botanic Gardens in Germany when he saw that their habitat was fragile. The plants were kept alive at the gardens, but botanists could not solve the problem of propagating them from seed.

The first published occurrence of N. thermarum germination was by Carlos Magdalena, at the Royal Botanical Gardens, Kew. By placing the seeds and seedlings into pots of loam surrounded by water of the same level in a 25 °C (77 °F) environment, eight began to flourish and mature within weeks and in November 2009, the waterlilies flowered for the first time. During this time, a rat had eaten one of the last two cultivated plants in Germany. With the germination problem solved, Magdalena says that the tiny plants are easy to grow, giving it potential to be grown as a houseplant. In January 2014, a surviving water lily was stolen from the Royal Botanic Gardens. Botanic gardens have been criticised for not providing plant material to repatriate to Rwanda.

== Uses ==
It has been proposed to be used as a model species for basal angiosperms, due to its small size, rapid lifecycle, and small genome. For instance, together with Nymphaea dimorpha it has been used to study seed evolution.
