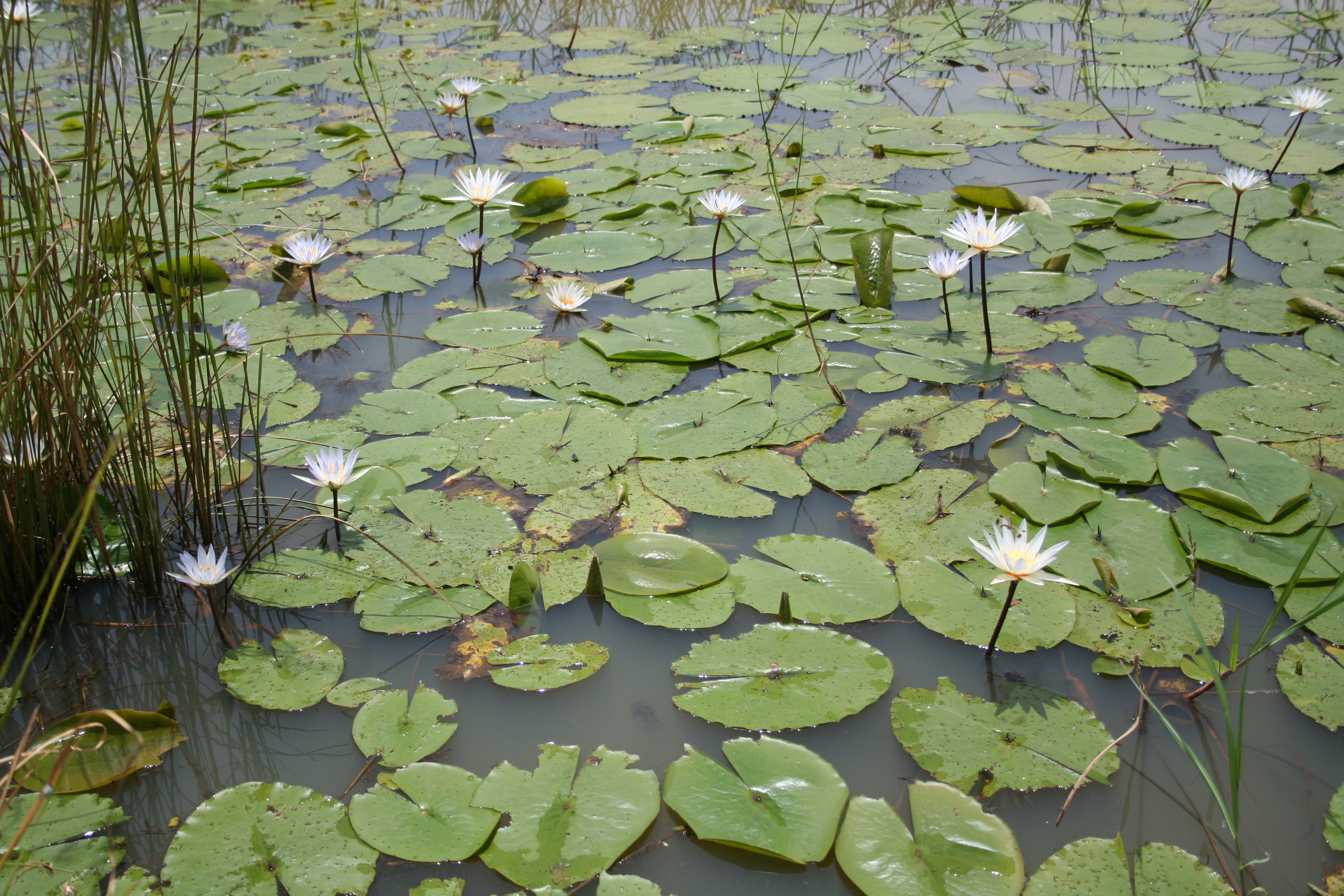

Conservation status
- Least Concern (IUCN 3.1)

Scientific classification
- Kingdom: Plantae
- Clade: Tracheophytes
- Clade: Angiosperms
- Order: Nymphaeales
- Family: Nymphaeaceae
- Genus: Nymphaea
- Subgenus: Nymphaea subg. Brachyceras
- Species: N. micrantha

Binomial name
- Nymphaea micrantha Guill. & Perr.

Synonyms
- Nymphaea vivipara Lehm.

= Nymphaea micrantha =

Species of water lily

Nymphaea micrantha is a water lily belonging to the genus Nymphaea. It is native to the tropics of West Africa.

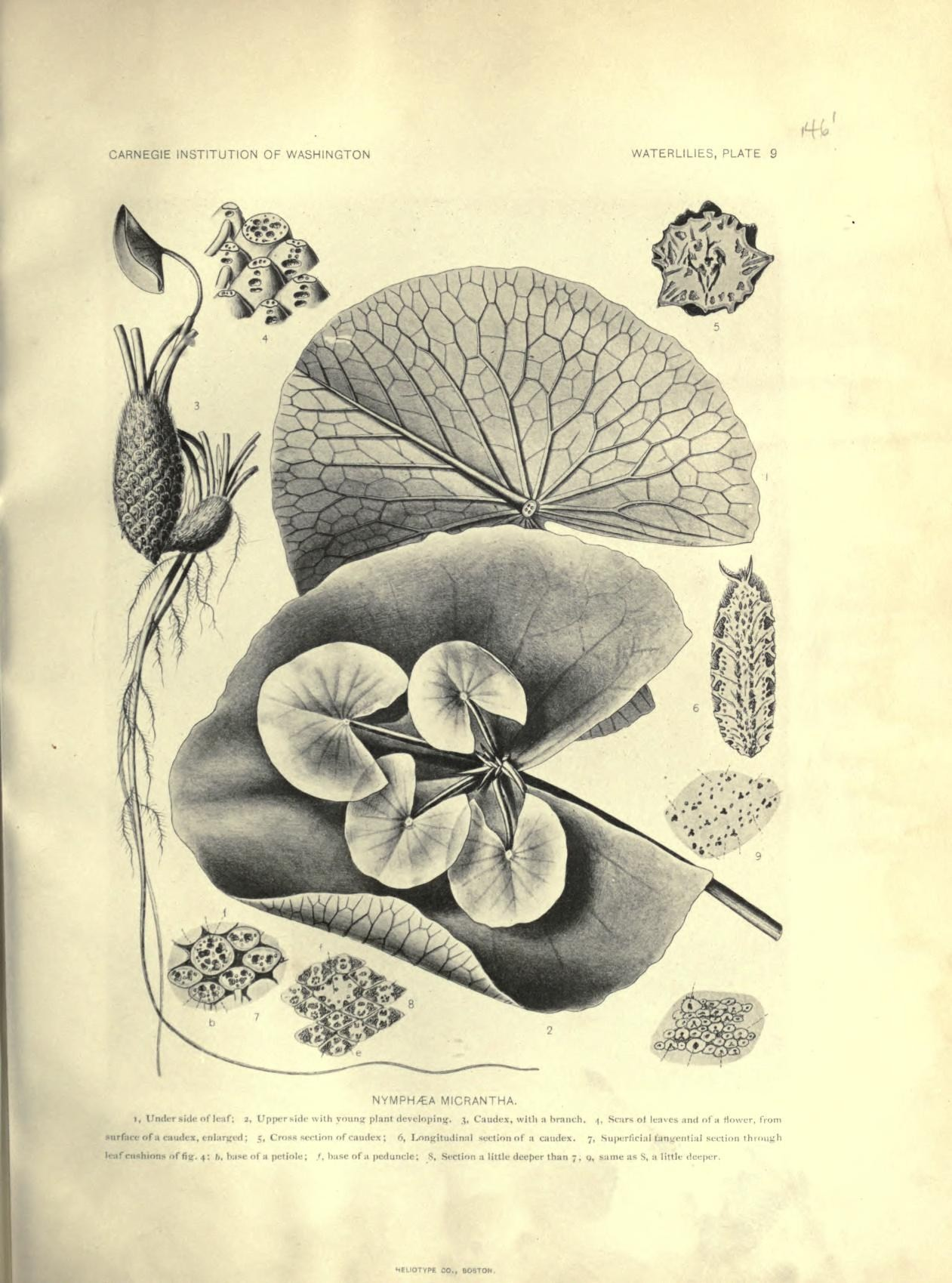
Botanical illustration of Nymphaea micrantha including a leaf with emerging plantlet, a unique feature of this species

== Description ==
Its leaves are oval or round, 8-12 cm long, with a cluster of bulbils on the top of the leaf stalk. Flowers can reach up to 10 cm in diameter, and appear from approximately September to October. The plant usually grows to a height of 20–80 cm (8–32 inches). It cannot be grown emersed.

== Reproduction ==
=== Vegetative reproduction ===
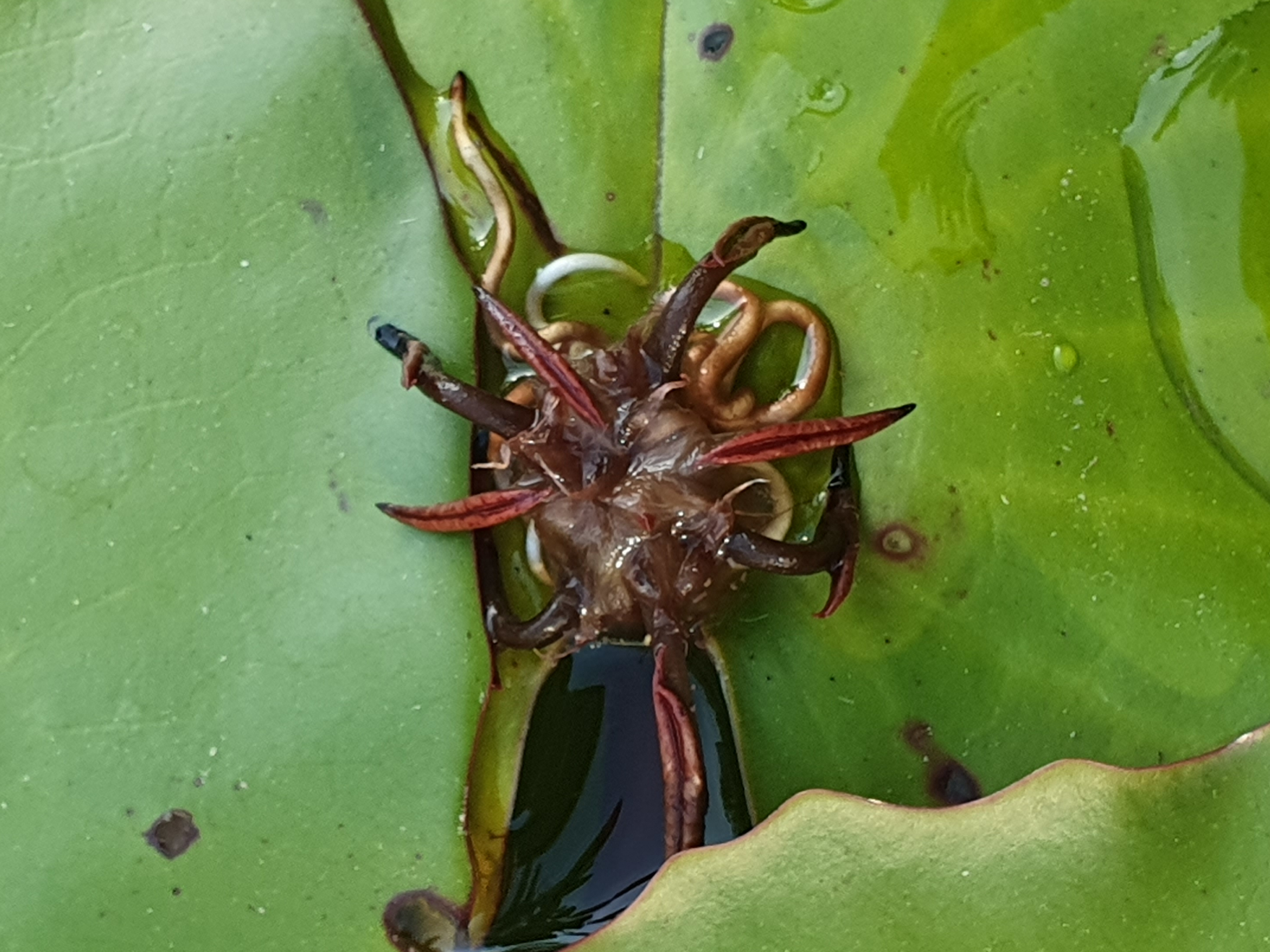
Foliar proliferation of Nymphaea micrantha Guill. & Perr.

New plantlets develop on the adaxial leaf surface through foliar proliferation. The development of those plantlets is halted, while the leaf is still attached. However, once the leaf is detached the plantlets develop fully. In India, which is outside of this species natural range, it has been shown that Nymphaea micrantha predominantly reproduces asexually. In India it has been shown to lack any amount of genetic diversity.

== Cytology ==
The chromosome count is n = 14. The genome size is 889.98 Mb.

== Taxonomy ==
=== Publication ===
It was first described by Jean Baptiste Antoine Guillemin and George Samuel Perrottet in 1831.

=== Natural hybridisation ===
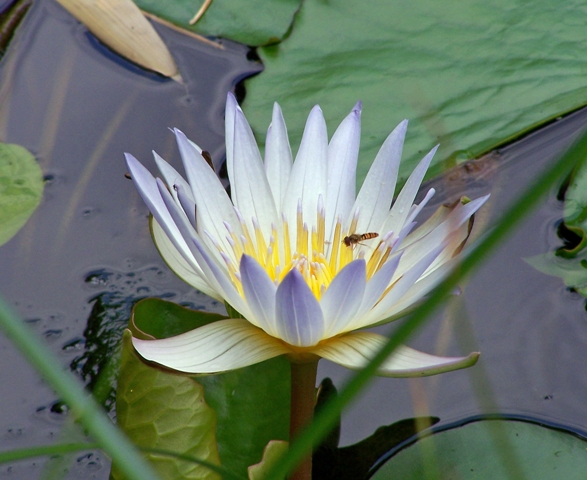
Detail of Nymphaea × daubenyana flower, a natural hybrid of Nymphaea nouchali var. caerulea and Nymphaea micrantha

Together with Nymphaea nouchali var. caerulea, Nymphaea micrantha forms the natural hybrid Nymphaea × daubenyana native to Chad.

== Etymology ==
The specific epithet micrantha, from the Greek mikros meaning small and anthos meaning flower, means small-flowered.

== Uses ==
=== Food source ===
Seeds of Nymphaea lotus and Nymphaea micrantha are eaten in Senegal.
