= Nymphaea guineensis =

Conservation status
- Least Concern (IUCN 3.1)

Scientific classification
- Kingdom: Plantae
- Clade: Tracheophytes
- Clade: Angiosperms
- Order: Nymphaeales
- Family: Nymphaeaceae
- Genus: Nymphaea
- Subgenus: Nymphaea subg. Brachyceras
- Species: N. guineensis

Binomial name
- Nymphaea guineensis Schumach. & Thonn.

Synonyms
- Nymphaea abbreviata Guill. & Perr.; Nymphaea rufescens Guill. & Perr.

Species of water lily

Nymphaea guineensis is a species of waterlily native to the region spanning from tropical West Africa to Chad.

== Description ==
=== Vegetative characteristics ===
The leaves are 22 cm long, and 19 cm wide. The leaves have an entire margin. The abaxial leaf surface displays reddish colouration.

=== Generative characteristics ===
The flowers are 13 cm wide. The petals are purple and pointed. The globose, smooth fruit bears numerous subglobose, arillate seeds.

== Taxonomy ==
=== Publication ===
It was first described by Heinrich Christian Friedrich Schumacher and Peter Thonning in 1827.

=== Type specimen ===
The type specimen was collected by Thonning in Ghana. Insects have damaged the preserved specimen.

=== Placement within Nymphaea ===
It is placed in Nymphaea subgenus Brachyceras.

== Etymology ==
The specific epithet guineensis means "from Guinea".

== Conservation ==
The IUCN conservation status is least concern (LC).

== Ecology ==
=== Habitat ===
In Togo, Nymphaea guineensis occurs in ponds. In Nigeria, it has been observed in temporary, shallow, bright, aquatic habitats, which are less than 50 cm deep, and dry out in between the rainy seasons. In Chad, it has also been observed in deep waters. In North Chad, a prosperous population has been observed in a semi-desert region.

== Use ==
In the Ivory Coast, the cooked seeds are eaten.
