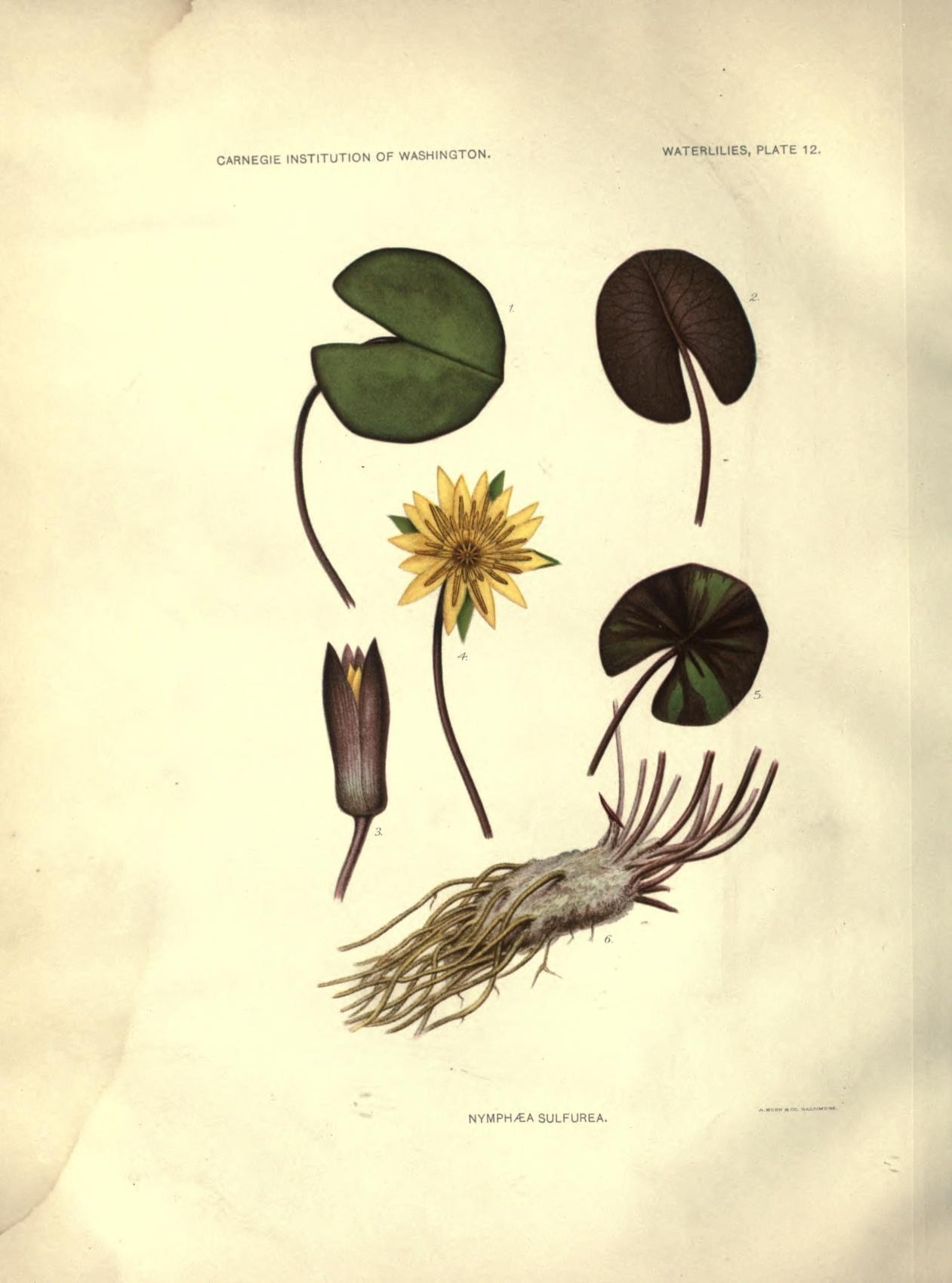
- Botanical illustration of Nymphaea sulphurea in the publication "The waterlilies: a monograph of the genus Nymphaea" by Henry Shoemaker Conard

Conservation status
- Data Deficient (IUCN 3.1)

Scientific classification
- Kingdom: Plantae
- Clade: Tracheophytes
- Clade: Angiosperms
- Order: Nymphaeales
- Family: Nymphaeaceae
- Genus: Nymphaea
- Subgenus: Nymphaea subg. Brachyceras
- Species: N. sulphurea

Binomial name
- Nymphaea sulphurea Gilg
- It is native to Angola, Democratic Republic of the Congo, and Zambia

Synonyms
- Nymphaea primulina Hutch.

= Nymphaea sulphurea =

Species of water lily

Nymphaea sulphurea is a species of waterlily native to Angola, Zambia, and the Democratic Republic of the Congo.

== Description ==
=== Vegetative characteristics ===
Nymphaea sulphurea has stout, cone-shaped rhizomes. The suborbicular to broadly ovate, petiolate, 4.5-5.5 cm long leaves have an entire margin. The petioles are 38–46 cm long.

=== Generative characteristics ===
The flowers are 4.5–7 cm wide. The lanceolate sepals with acute apex are 2–3 cm long, and 1.5–1 cm wide. The dark sulphur yellow petals are 2.8–2 cm long, and 1.2-0.7 cm wide. The androecium consists of 40-50 stamens with bright yellow anthers. The gynoecium consists of 12-14 carpels.

== Taxonomy ==
It was first described by Ernest Friedrich Gilg in 1903. The type specimen was collected by Hugo Baum in Minnesera on 17 January 1900. It is placed in the subgenus Nymphaea subg. Brachyceras.

=== Etymology ===
The specific epithet sulphurea, from the Latin sulphureus, means yellow, and refers to the floral colouration.

== Conservation ==
The IUCN conservation status is Data Deficient (DD).

== Ecology ==
=== Habitat ===
Nymphaea sulphurea occurs in rivers, lakes, pools, and in deep waters.
