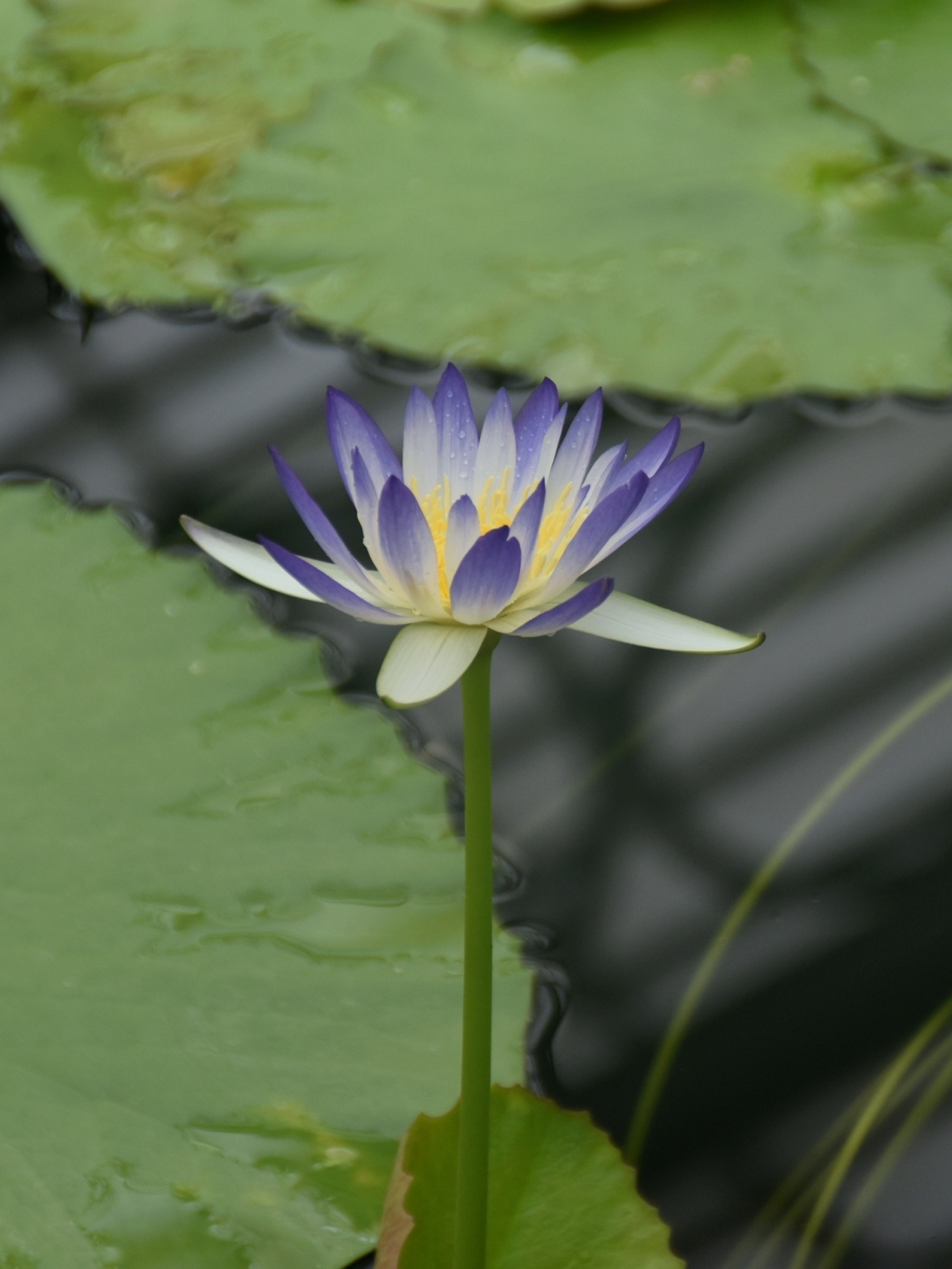
- Flowering Nymphaea lukei cultivated at the Royal Botanic Gardens, Kew

Scientific classification
- Kingdom: Plantae
- Clade: Tracheophytes
- Clade: Angiosperms
- Order: Nymphaeales
- Family: Nymphaeaceae
- Genus: Nymphaea
- Subgenus: Nymphaea subg. Confluentes; S.W.L.Jacobs

Type species
- Nymphaea violacea Lehm.

Species
- See here

= Nymphaea subg. Confluentes =

Subgenus of flowering plants

Nymphaea subg. Confluentes is a subgenus of the genus Nymphaea.

== Description ==
=== Vegetative characteristics ===
Nymphaea subg. Confluentes has tuberous rhizomes. The leaves have an entire to sinuate margin.

=== Generative characteristics ===
The diurnal flowers extend above the water surface. The petals do not have a conspicuous gap between petals and stamens. The seeds are smaller than those of Nymphaea subg. Anecphya.

== Taxonomy ==
It was described by Surrey Wilfrid Laurance Jacobs in 2007 with Nymphaea violacea Lehm. as the type species.

=== Species ===
- Nymphaea elleniae S.W.L.Jacobs
- Nymphaea hastifolia Domin
- Nymphaea lukei S.W.L.Jacobs & Hellq.
- Nymphaea noelae S.W.L.Jacobs & Hellq.
- Nymphaea ondinea Löhne, Wiersema & Borsch
- Nymphaea vaporalis S.W.L.Jacobs & Hellq.
- Nymphaea violacea Lehm.

=== Etymology ===
The name of the subgenus Confluentes refers to the gradual transition of the petals into stamens.
