= Nymphaea kakaduensis =

Scientific classification
- Kingdom: Plantae
- Clade: Tracheophytes
- Clade: Angiosperms
- Order: Nymphaeales
- Family: Nymphaeaceae
- Genus: Nymphaea
- Subgenus: Nymphaea subg. Anecphya
- Species: N. kakaduensis

Binomial name
- Nymphaea kakaduensis Hellq., A.Leu & M.L.Moody
- Nymphaea kakaduensis is endemic to the Northern Territory, Australia

Species of water lily

Nymphaea kakaduensis is a species of waterlily endemic to the Northern Territory, Australia.

== Description ==
=== Vegetative characteristics ===
Nymphaea kakaduensis is a perennial aquatic plant with a globose rhizome. The petiolate, oval to oval-elliptic, 15.6-17.4 cm long, and 11.8-16.6 cm wide leaves have an entire, slightly undulate, or sinuate-crenate margin. The adaxial leaf surface is dark green, and the abaxial leaf surface is dark purple. The petiole is brownish-green, and exhibits fused stipules.

=== Generative characteristics ===
The 5.5–10.5 cm wide, fragrant, cupped flowers extend above the water surface. The white, pink, brown, or green sepals are 3–6 cm long, and 1–2.6 cm wide. The 14-27 ovate–elliptic, white, more rarely blue, or pinkish petals are 2–5 cm long and 0.6–2 cm wide. The androecium consists of 80-200 yellow stamens. The gynoecium consists of 14-30 carpels. The globose, 2–4 cm wide fruit bears 1.8-2.1 mm long, 1.2-1.3 mm wide, dark brown to dark olive seeds with a longitudinal ridge.

== Reproduction ==
=== Generative reproduction ===
Flowering and fruiting occurs from April to June.

== Taxonomy ==
=== Publication ===
It was first described by Carl Barre Hellquist, Andre Leu, and Michael L. Moody in 2021.

=== Type specimen ===
The type specimen of Nymphaea kakaduensis was collected by Carl Barre Hellquist, Andre Leu, and Fred Baird in a billabong at the upper end of Jim Jim Creek within Kakadu National Park, Northern Territory, Australia on the 29th of April 2011.

== Etymology ==
The specific epithet kakaduensis references Kakadu National Park, the native habitat and only known location of Nymphaea kakaduensis.

== Conservation ==
It has a limited distribution, but is not threatened, as it occurs in a protected area.

== Ecology ==
=== Habitat ===
It is found in billabongs, and is associated with Nymphaea pubescens, Nymphaea violacea, and Nymphaea macrosperma.
