= Billabong (disambiguation) =

Billabong is an Australian English word for a small lake, specifically an oxbow lake.

Billabong may also refer to:

- Billabong (clothing), a brand of clothing and surfing wear
- Billabong, a 1969 short film by Will Hindle
- The Billabong Series of children's books by Mary Grant Bruce
