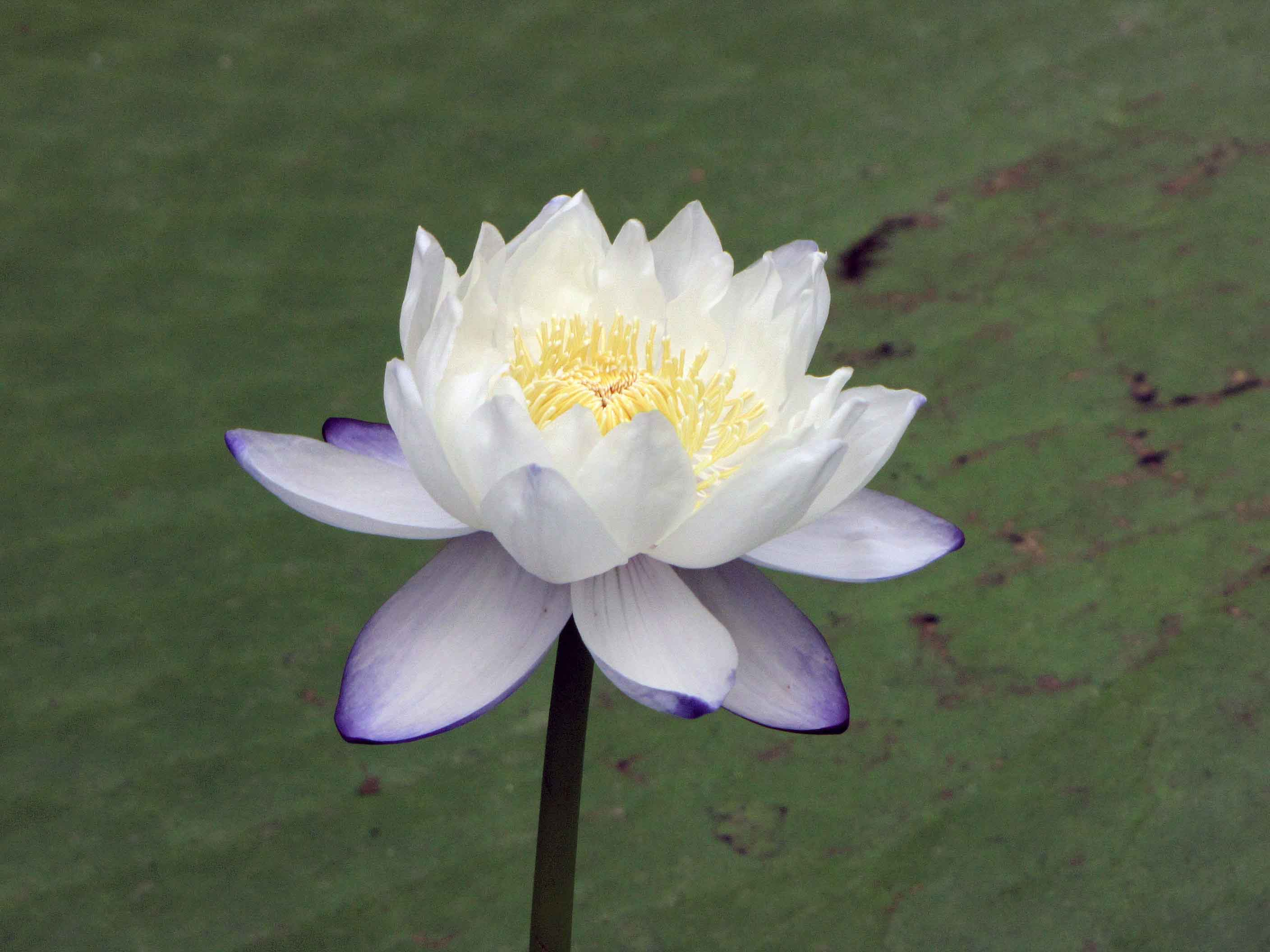
- Flowering Nymphaea atrans in the Royal Botanic Gardens, Kew

Conservation status
- Special Least Concern (NCA)

Scientific classification
- Kingdom: Plantae
- Clade: Embryophytes
- Clade: Tracheophytes
- Clade: Spermatophytes
- Clade: Angiosperms
- Order: Nymphaeales
- Family: Nymphaeaceae
- Genus: Nymphaea
- Subgenus: Nymphaea subg. Anecphya
- Species: N. atrans

Binomial name
- Nymphaea atrans S.W.L.Jacobs
- Nymphaea atrans is endemic to Queensland, Australia

= Nymphaea atrans =

Species of water lily

Nymphaea atrans is a species of waterlily which is endemic to Queensland, Australia.

== Description ==
=== Vegetative characteristics ===
Nymphaea atrans is a perennial plant with vertical, short, and swollen rhizomes. The leaf blades with toothed margins of 2mm long, regularly spaced teeth may reach 40 cm in width. The base of the petiole is winged.

=== Generative characteristics ===
The flowers may rise up to 40 cm above the water level. Over time, the colour of Nymphaea atrans flowers shifts from blue and white to a deep pink. Each flower has ca. 300 stamens with 14 mm long, cylindrical to membranous filaments. The anthers, typically featuring a small hooked apical appendage, can reach up to 10 mm in length.

== Cytology ==
The nuclear genome size is 1408.32 Mb, and the chromosome count is n = 42. The chloroplast genome is 160,990 bp long.

== Reproduction ==
=== Generative reproduction ===
Flowering occurs from July to November.

=== Natural hybridisation ===
Natural hybrids of Nymphaea atrans with Nymphaea immutabilis with reduced fertility have been reported from areas of sympatric occurrence. Apart from the reduced fertility, the hybrids can be identified through the lighter pink colouration of older flowers, as they do not darken to the darker shades found in Nymphaea atrans. It was reported that in one hybrid population most individuals do not exhibit the characteristic shift in floral colouration. Additionally, even those that do exhibit this characteristic shift do not reliably produce offspring with the same trait from seed.

== Taxonomy ==
It was first described by Surrey Wilfrid Laurance Jacobs in 1992.

=== Type specimen ===
The type specimen was collected by Surrey Wilfrid Laurance Jacobs and J. Clarkson along the Bathurst Bay road north of Wakooka in Queensland, Australia on the 31st of July 1987.

=== Placement within Nymphaea ===
It is placed in Nymphaea subgenus Anecphya.

It is close to Nymphaea immutabilis. Despite morphological differences, a molecular study was unable to differentiate both species based on the nuclear marker ITS, as well as the chloroplast marker trnT-trnF.

== Etymology ==
The specific epithet atrans is derived from the Latin "atrans", meaning darkening, which references the shift of floral colouration from blue and white to a deep pink in ageing flowers.

== Conservation ==
The NCA status of Nymphaea atrans is Special Least Concern.

== Ecology ==
=== Habitat ===
It occurs in the Cape York Peninsula of northern Queensland, Australia. It occurs in Billabongs, lakes, and former pastoral dams on floodplains.

== Cultivation ==
Because of its outstanding, showy ornamental qualities, this species is grown in waterscape gardens globally and is well-suited for use as display plants in water gardens. It has been used in the creation of several new Nymphaea hybrids.
