= Nymphaea alexii =

Conservation status
- Special Least Concern (NCA)

Scientific classification
- Kingdom: Plantae
- Clade: Tracheophytes
- Clade: Angiosperms
- Order: Nymphaeales
- Family: Nymphaeaceae
- Genus: Nymphaea
- Subgenus: Nymphaea subg. Anecphya
- Species: N. alexii

Binomial name
- Nymphaea alexii S.W.L.Jacobs & Hellq.
- Nymphaea alexii is endemic to Queensland, Australia

Species of water lily

Nymphaea alexii is a species of waterlily endemic to Queensland, Australia.

== Description ==
=== Vegetative characteristics ===
Nymphaea alexii is an annual or perennial plant with 2 cm wide, globose rhizomes. The elliptic, 15 cm long, and 10 cm wide leaf blades have a slightly sinuate margin.

=== Generative characteristics ===
The fragrant flowers extend up to 30 cm above the water surface. The androecium consists of 150 stamens with 17 mm long membranous filaments. The gynoecium consists of 8-16 carpels. The apex of the ovary often displays red colouration. The 4.5 cm wide, globose fruit bears elongate, glabrous, longitudinally ridged, 1-2 mm long seeds.

== Taxonomy ==
=== Publication ===
It was first described by Surrey Wilfrid Laurance Jacobs and Carl Barre Hellquist in 2006.

=== Type specimen ===
The type specimen was collected by Jacobs and Hellquist in Queensland, Australia on the 17th of April 2005.

=== Placement within Nymphaea ===
It is placed in Nymphaea subgenus Confluentes.

== Etymology ==
Nymphaea alexii is named after Alex James Fussell, the grandson of Surrey Wilfrid Laurance Jacobs.

== Conservation ==
The NCA status of Nymphaea alexii is Special Least Concern.

== Ecology ==
=== Habitat ===
It occurs in shallow margins of lagoons, and in ephemeral billabongs.
