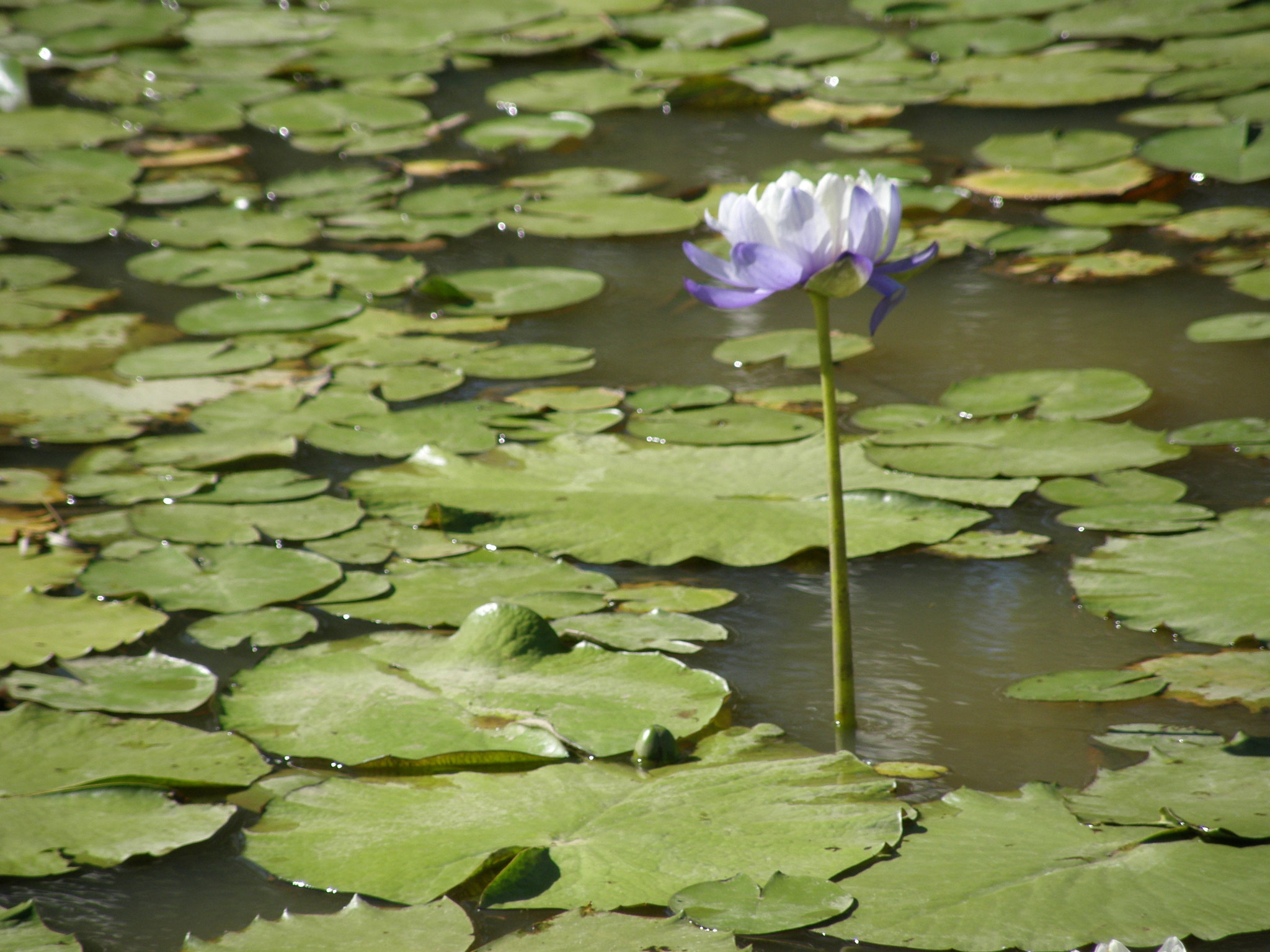
- Flowering Nymphaea immutabilis at Mount Carbine, Queensland, Australia

Conservation status
- Special Least Concern (NCA)

Scientific classification
- Kingdom: Plantae
- Clade: Tracheophytes
- Clade: Angiosperms
- Order: Nymphaeales
- Family: Nymphaeaceae
- Genus: Nymphaea
- Subgenus: Nymphaea subg. Anecphya
- Species: N. immutabilis

Binomial name
- Nymphaea immutabilis S.W.L.Jacobs
- Nymphaea immutabilis is native to Western Australia, the Northern Territory, and Queensland, Australia

Synonyms
- Nymphaea lotus var. australis F.M.Bailey

= Nymphaea immutabilis =

Species of water lily

Nymphaea immutabilis (black-soil waterlily) is a species of waterlily native to the far north of Western Australia, the Northern Territory, and northern and eastern Queensland, Australia.

== Description ==
=== Vegetative characteristics ===
Nymphaea immutabilis is an annual or perennial plant with globose rhizomes. The round, 70 cm wide leaves have dentate margins.

=== Generative characteristics ===
The flowers are up to 30 cm in diameter, on pedicels or stalks up to 5 m long; the outer petals are blue, grading to white inner petals. The flowers extend up to 50 cm above the water surface. The flowers have four sepals, and 34 petals. The androecium consists of 400 stamens. The gynoecium consists of 9-20 carpels. The globose, 5 cm wide fruit bears numerous 4 mm long, and 2.5 mm wide, rounded seeds with trichomes arranged in irregular rows. The immature seeds are red, but mature to brownish-grey. The seeds have a mechanism of physiological dormancy.

== Cytology ==
The chromosome count is n = 42. The genome size is 1408.32 Mb.

== Reproduction ==
=== Generative reproduction ===
Flowering occurs from March to November.

== Taxonomy ==
=== Publication ===
It was first described by Surrey Wilfrid Laurance Jacobs in 1992.

=== Type specimen ===
The type specimen was collected by S. Jacobs and J. Clarkson near Mareeba, Queensland, Australia on the 26th of July 1987.

=== Placement within Nymphaea ===
It is placed in Nymphaea subgenus Anecphya.

=== Separation of Nymphaea kimberleyensis ===
The subspecies Nymphaea immutabilis subsp. kimberleyensis S.W.L.Jacobs was described in 1992. Later in 2011, it was elevated to a separate species Nymphaea kimberleyensis (S.W.L.Jacobs) S.W.L.Jacobs & Hellq.

== Etymology ==
The specific epithet immutabilis, meaning unchanging, references the floral colouration, which does not change as the flower ages.

== Conservation ==
The NCA status of Nymphaea immutabilis is Special Least Concern (SL). In the Northern Territory it is categorised as vulnerable.

== Ecology ==
=== Habitat ===
It occurs in swamps, permanent, or temporary waters, billabongs, streams, and rivers.
