= Nymphaea noelae =

Conservation status
- Special Least Concern (NCA)

Scientific classification
- Kingdom: Plantae
- Clade: Tracheophytes
- Clade: Angiosperms
- Order: Nymphaeales
- Family: Nymphaeaceae
- Genus: Nymphaea
- Subgenus: Nymphaea subg. Anecphya
- Species: N. noelae

Binomial name
- Nymphaea noelae S.W.L.Jacobs & Hellq.
- Nymphaea noelae is endemic to Queensland, Australia

Species of water lily

Nymphaea noelae is a species of water lily endemic to Queensland, Australia.

== Description ==
=== Vegetative characteristics ===
Nymphaea noelae is an annual or perennial aquatic plant with 2 cm wide, globose rhizomes. The sub-orbicular to elliptic, petiolate, 3.5–23 cm long, and 10.5–22 cm wide leaves have a sinuate margin. The abaxial leaf surface is purple towards the periphery, but green in the centre.

=== Generative characteristics ===
The fragrant flowers extend up to 30 cm above the water surface. The four green sepals with an acute apex are 7.5–8.0 cm long, and 2.3–2.6 cm wide. The 12–20 lanceolate, white to blue petals are 4.5–6.0 cm long, and 1.2–2.0 cm wide. The androecium consists of 100–200 yellow stamens. The gynoecium consists of 14–16 carpels. The globose, 4–5 cm long, and 3 cm wide fruit bears glabrous, elongated, 1.2–2 mm long, and 0.8–1.4 mm wide seeds.

== Taxonomy ==
=== Publication ===
It was first described by Surrey Wilfrid Laurance Jacobs and Carl Barre Hellquist in 2011.

=== Type specimen ===
Type specimen was collected by Surrey Wilfrid Laurance Jacobs and Carl Barre Hellquist in Jerry Lagoon, Cape York, Queensland, Australia on the 17th of June 2007.

=== Placement within Nymphaea ===
It is placed in Nymphaea subgenus Confluentes.

== Etymology ==
The specific epithet noelae is derived from Noel Elizabeth Hellquist, the granddaughter of Carl Barre Hellquist.

== Conservation ==
The NCA status of Nymphaea noelae is Special Least Concern (SL).

== Ecology ==
=== Habitat ===
It occurs in billabongs and lagoons.
