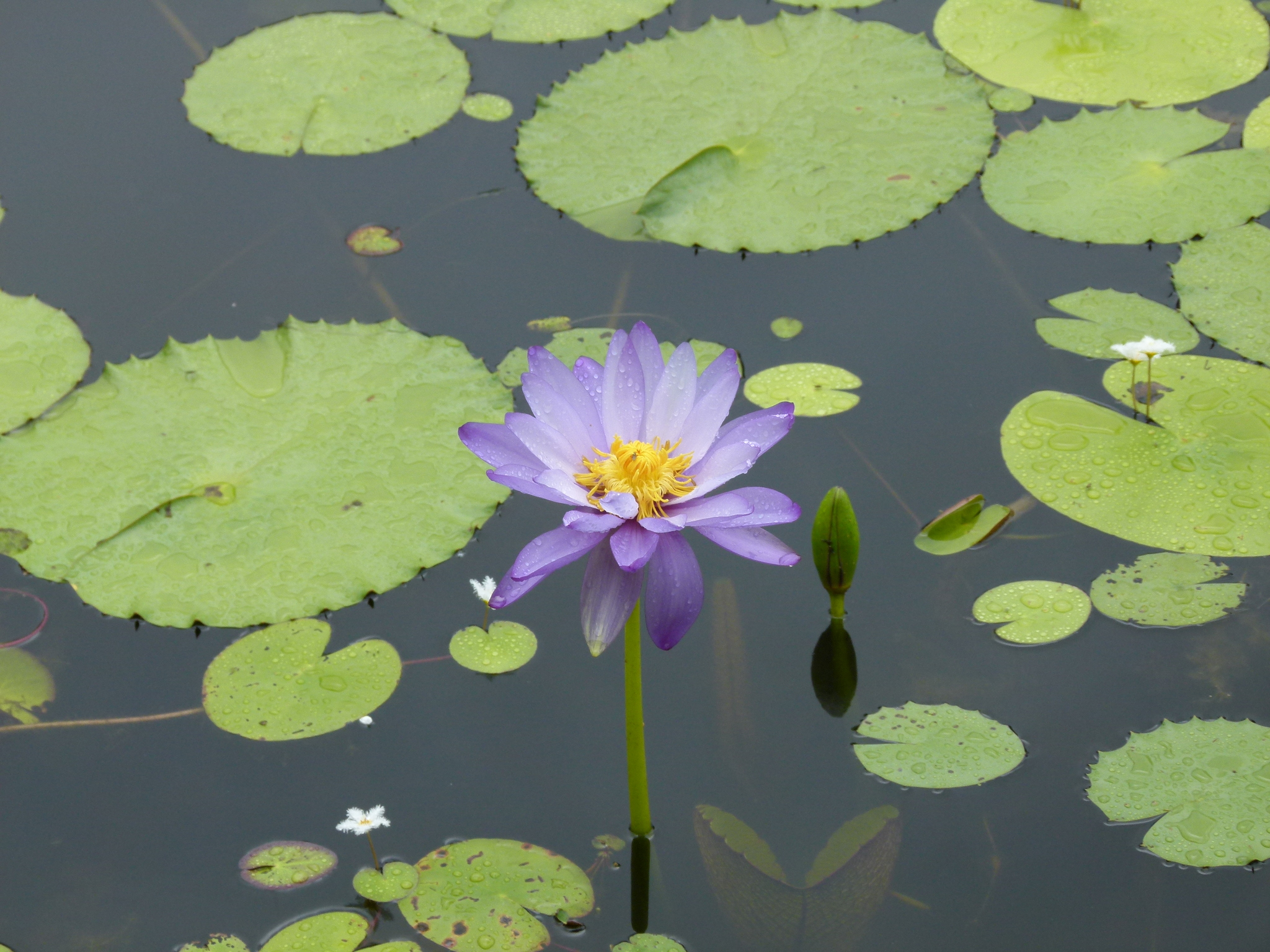
- In natural habitat in north Queensland

Conservation status
- Special Least Concern (NCA)

Scientific classification
- Kingdom: Plantae
- Clade: Tracheophytes
- Clade: Angiosperms
- Order: Nymphaeales
- Family: Nymphaeaceae
- Genus: Nymphaea
- Subgenus: Nymphaea subg. Anecphya
- Species: N. gigantea

Binomial name
- Nymphaea gigantea Hook.

Synonyms
- 12 synonyms: Castalia gigantea (Hook.) Britten; Leuconymphaea gigantea (Hook.) Kuntze; Nymphaea gigantea var. normalis Domin; Nymphaea gigantea var. alba (Benth. & F.Muell.) K.C.Landon; Nymphaea gigantea f. alba Benth. & F.Muell.; Nymphaea gigantea f. candida Domin; Nymphaea gigantea f. hudsonii (Anon.) K.C.Landon; Nymphaea gigantea var. hudsonii Anon.; Nymphaea gigantea var. neorosea K.C.Landon; Nymphaea gigantea var. rosea Lovassy; Nymphaea gigantea var. serrata Domin; Victoria fitzroyana Loudon

= Nymphaea gigantea =

Giant waterlily

Species of plant in the family Nymphaeaceae

Nymphaea gigantea, commonly known as the giant waterlily or blue waterlily, is a perennial, herbaceous plant in the family Nymphaeaceae which is native to parts of northern and eastern Australia, and possibly New Guinea, and has been widely cultivated elsewhere. It is an aquatic plant whose natural habitat is permanent and semi-permanent still water bodies.

== Description ==
The giant waterlily has a rhizomatous growth habit - that is, the main stem of the plant grows horizontally under the ground (in this case in the mud at the bottom of a lake or pond) and only the leaves and flowers are seen above the surface. The rhizome is globose, the large floating leaves are orbicular to slightly egg-shaped, and cordate (i.e. the leaf stem, which may reach up to 5 m (16 ft) in length, attaches to the leaf blade at the base of a deep radial cleft). The leaves measure up to 80 cm (31 in) diameter and are glabrous (hairless) on both sides, with regularly-spaced teeth along the margins measuring about 5 mm (0.20 in) long.

The large flowers are solitary and up to 25 cm (9.8 in) diameter. They are held on a rigid, upright peduncle that may extend up to 50 cm (20 in) above the water surface. They have four green sepals that measure about 11 cm (4.3 in) long and sometimes have blue or purple streaks, and up to 32 petals that are initially lilac or blue but fade to almost white with age.

The fruit is – in botanical terms – a berry. After fertilisation of the flower it is drawn underwater by the contraction of the peduncle (i.e. the flower stalk), where the fruit ripens just below the surface. They are roughly the size of an apple and may contain up to 3,000 seeds.

=== Phenology ===
Flowering occurs throughout the year, but is more common in warmer months. The flowers are open during the day and closed at night.

=== Cytology ===
The chromosome count is n = 112. The genome size is 2709.06 Mb.

== Taxonomy ==
Nymphaea gigantea was first described in 1852 by the English botanist and illustrator William Jackson Hooker in The Botanical Magazine, based on material collected by John Carne Bidwill from the Wide Bay area of Queensland (at that time still a part of the colony of New South Wales). The description was accompanied by an illustration by Walter Hood Fitch detailing the flower. It is placed in the subgenus Nymphaea subg. Anecphya.

== Distribution and habitat ==
The range of the giant waterlily in Australia is from northeastern New South Wales, through eastern and northern Queensland, northern parts of the Northern Territory, and the far northeast of Western Australia. Some non-authoritative sources claim it is also native to New Guinea.

The habitat is permanent and semi-permanent waters of lakes, billabongs, and sluggish rivers where the bottom is deep mud and the water depth is at least 1.5 m (4 ft 11 in).

== Conservation ==
This species is listed by the Queensland Government's Department of Environment, Science and Innovation as "special least concern", a rating unique to Queensland which is ranked between "least concern" and "near threatened". As of 6 July 2023, this species has not been assessed by the International Union for Conservation of Nature (IUCN).

== Cultivation ==
The species was brought to England by Frederick Strange, where it received notices in newspapers and began to be cultivated by nurseries.

== Uses ==
Various parts of Nymphaea gigantea are edible and the plant was an important staple food for indigenous Australians across the northern parts of Australia. The golfball-sized tubers were collected from the muddy bottoms of water bodies by indigenous women and roasted before eating. The flower buds and peeled stalks were eaten raw, and the seeds could either be eaten on their own after roasting the whole fruit, or were pounded to make a flour for damper.

== Gallery ==
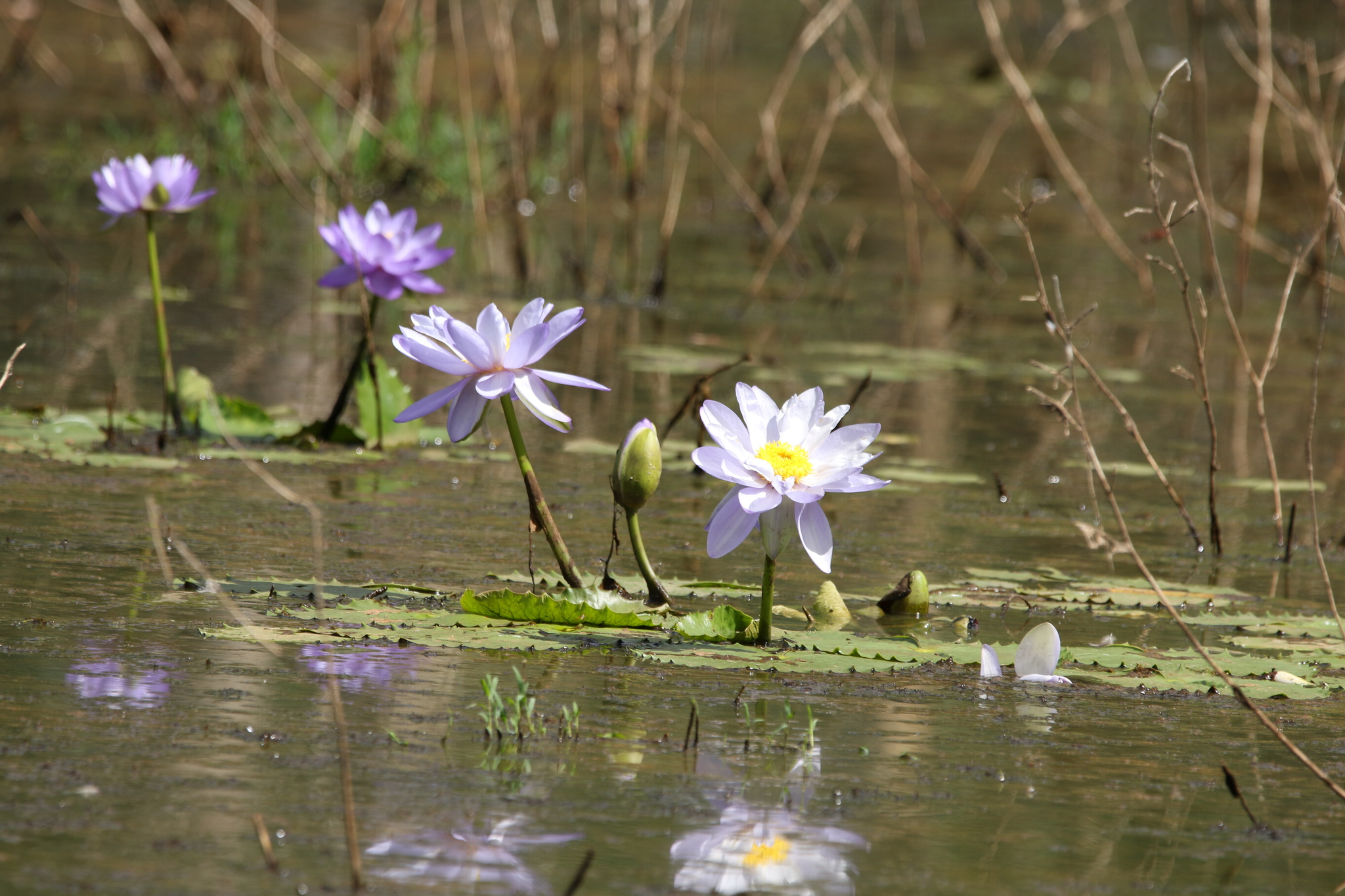
In natural habitat, southern Queensland, March 2022

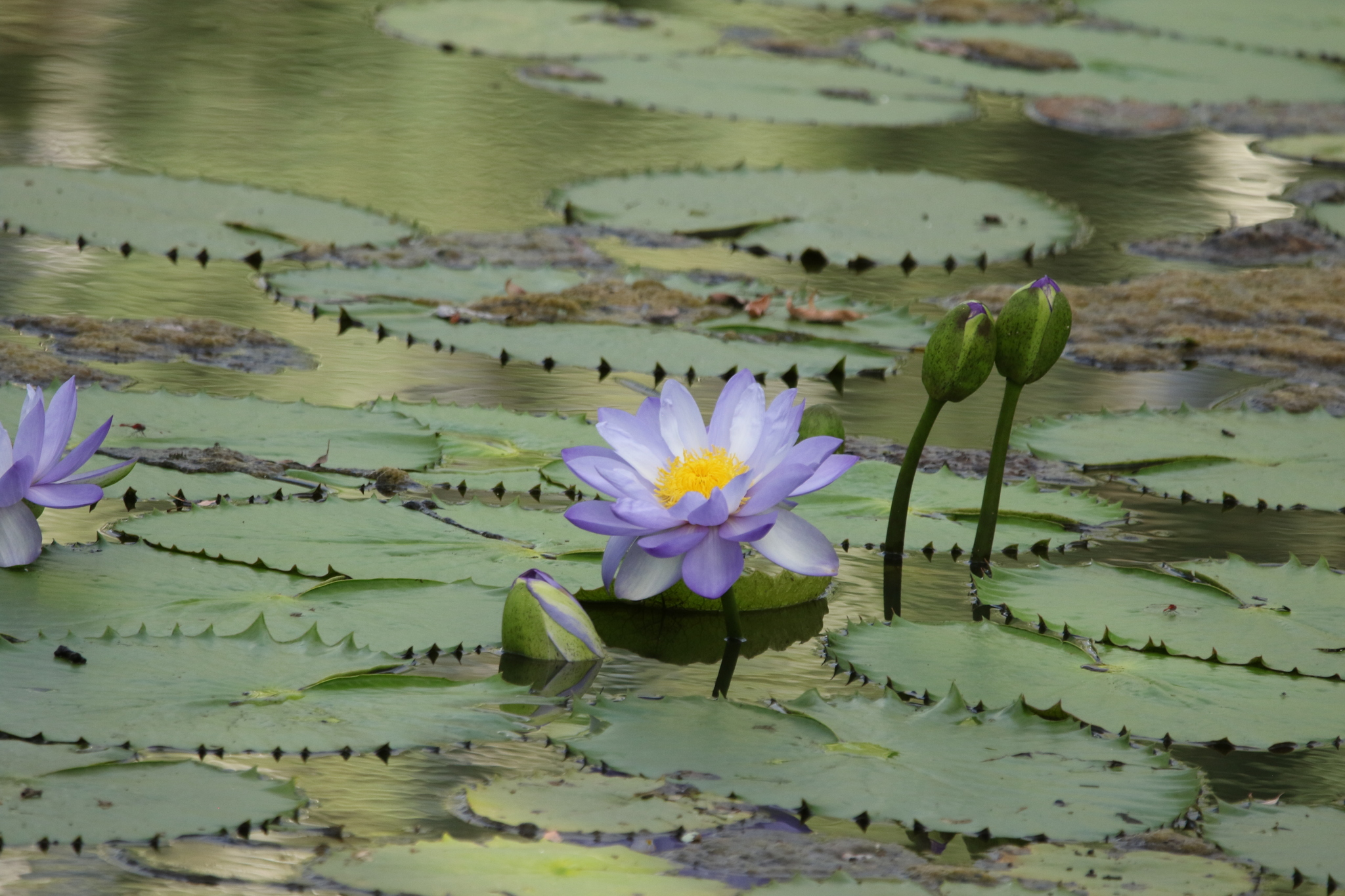
Southern Queensland, March 2022

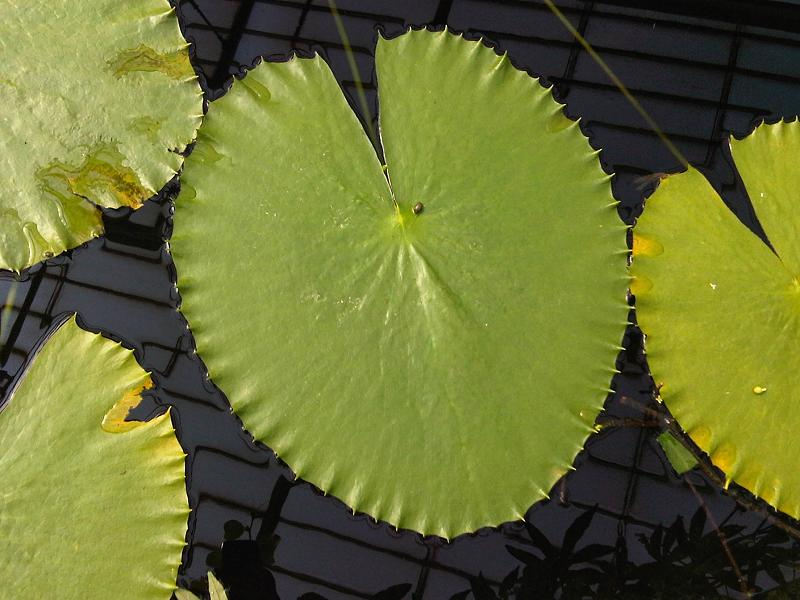
Leaves (cultivated at Kew Gardens)
