= Nymphaea jacobsii =

Conservation status
- Special Least Concern (NCA)

Scientific classification
- Kingdom: Plantae
- Clade: Tracheophytes
- Clade: Angiosperms
- Order: Nymphaeales
- Family: Nymphaeaceae
- Genus: Nymphaea
- Subgenus: Nymphaea subg. Anecphya
- Species: N. jacobsii

Binomial name
- Nymphaea jacobsii Hellq.

Subspecies
- Nymphaea jacobsii subsp. jacobsii; Nymphaea jacobsii subsp. toomba Hellq.
- Nymphaea jacobsii is endemic to Queensland, Australia

Species of water lily

Nymphaea jacobsii is a species of waterlily endemic to Queensland, Australia.

== Description ==
=== Vegetative characteristics ===
Nymphaea jacobsii is an annual or perennial aquatic plant with elongate to globose rhizomes. The broadly elliptic, 40 cm long, 35 cm wide, petiolate leaves have a dentate margin.

=== Generative characteristics ===
The inodorous flowers extend up to 30 cm above the water surface. The sepals are 4.2–13 cm long, and 5.5 cm wide. The 12-24 white to deep blue, lanceolate petals are 1–11.5 cm long, and 2.5-5.5 cm wide. The androecium consists of 150-300 yellow stamens. The gynoecium consists of 12-25 carpels. The globose, 2.3–9 cm wide fruit bears numerous large, ovoid, 2.6–7 mm long and 2–3.5 mm wide seeds with 0.1-0.13 mm long trichomes.

== Taxonomy ==
=== Publication ===
It was first described by Carl Barre Hellquist in 2011.

=== Type specimen ===
The Type specimen was collected by S. W. L. Jacobs and C. B. Hellquist in Lake Powlanthanga, Queensland, Australia on the 12th of June 2007.

=== Subspecies ===
Two subspecies, namely Nymphaea jacobsii subsp. jacobsii, and Nymphaea jacobsii subsp. toomba Hellq., have been described.

=== Placement within Nymphaea ===
It is placed in Nymphaea subgenus Anecphya.

=== Natural hybridisation ===
A natural hybrid of Nymphaea jacobsii and Nymphaea violacea has been described, but not named.

== Etymology ==
It is named after Surrey Wilfrid Laurance Jacobs.

== Conservation ==
The NCA status of Nymphaea jacobsii is Special Least Concern (SL).

== Ecology ==
=== Habitat ===
It is found in lakes, and creeks.
