= Nymphaea georginae =

Conservation status
- Special Least Concern (NCA)

Scientific classification
- Kingdom: Plantae
- Clade: Tracheophytes
- Clade: Angiosperms
- Order: Nymphaeales
- Family: Nymphaeaceae
- Genus: Nymphaea
- Subgenus: Nymphaea subg. Anecphya
- Species: N. georginae

Binomial name
- Nymphaea georginae S.W.L.Jacobs & Hellq.
- Nymphaea georginae is native to the Northern Territory, and the state of Queensland, Australia.

Species of water lily

Nymphaea georginae is a species of waterlily native to the Northern Territory, and the state of Queensland, Australia.

== Description ==
=== Vegetative characteristics ===
Nymphaea georginae is a perennial plant with 4 cm wide, globose rhizomes. The orbicular to elliptic, 60 cm wide floating leaves have dentate margins.

=== Generative characteristics ===
The fragrant flowers can extend up to 30 cm above the water surface. The flowers have 4 sepals, and 12-26 petals. The androecium consists of 150-250 stamens. The gynoecium consists of 7-19 carpels. The 4 cm wide, globose fruit bears globose to subglobose, 2.5-4 mm wide seeds with interrupted rows of 0.1-0.15 mm long trichomes. The flowers are the most fragrant flowers within Nymphaea subgenus Anecphya.

== Taxonomy ==
=== Publication ===
It was first described by Surrey Wilfrid Laurance Jacobs and Carl Barre Hellquist in 2006.

=== Type specimen ===
The type specimen of Nymphaea georginae was collected by S. Jacobs and C. B. Hellquist in the Georgina River in Camooweal, Queensland, Australia on the 19th April 2005.

=== Placement within Nymphaea ===
It is placed in Nymphaea subgenus Anecphya.

== Etymology ==
The specific epithet georginae refers to the Georgina River, which is the type locality.

== Conservation ==
The NCA status of Nymphaea georginae is Special Least Concern (SL).

== Ecology ==
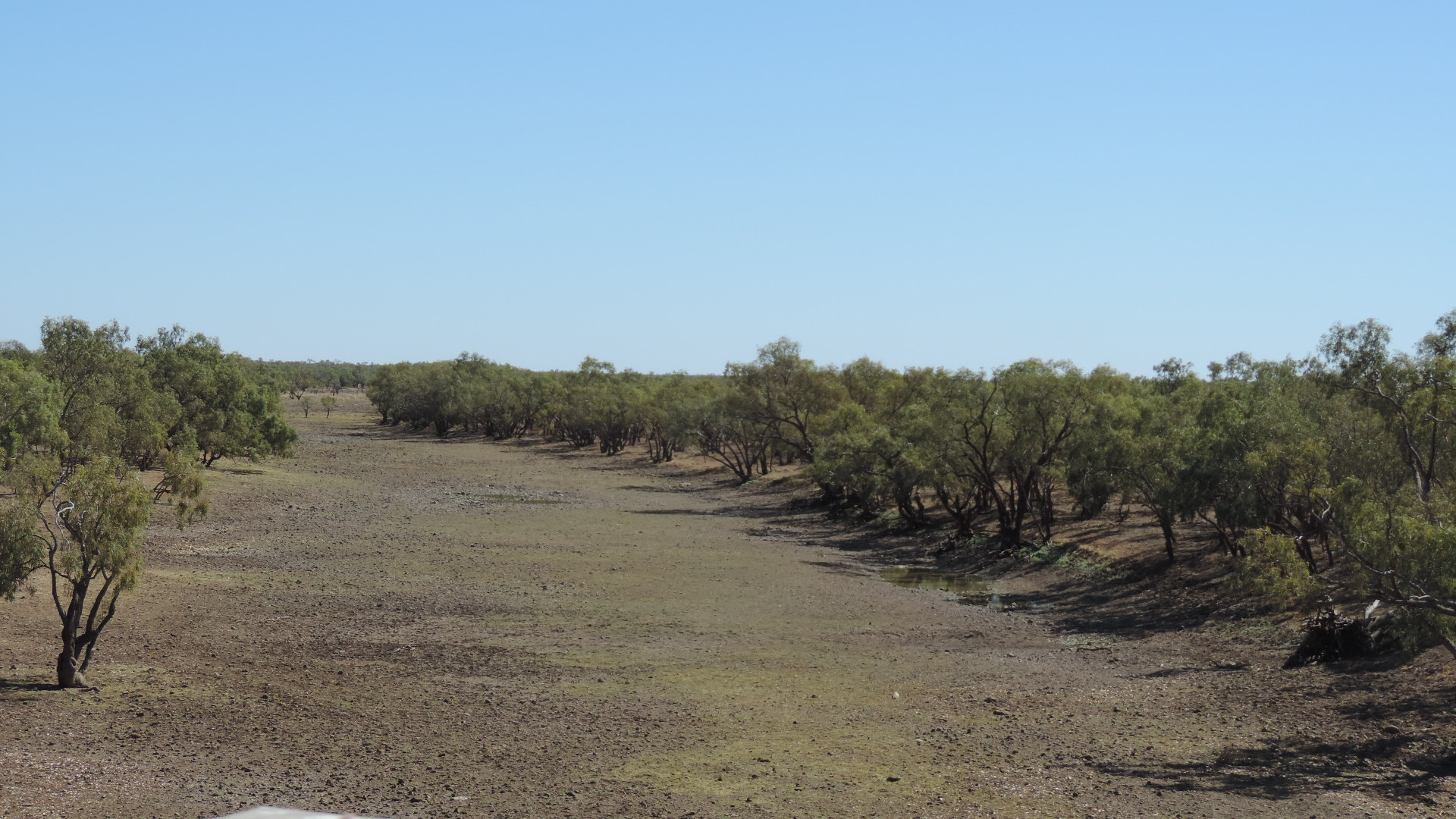
Dry river bed of the Georgina River, Camooweal

=== Habitat ===
Nymphaea georginae grows in billabongs and flood channels, habitats characterised by prolonged periods of drought and equally extended wet periods.
