= Nymphaea hastifolia =

Scientific classification
- Kingdom: Plantae
- Clade: Tracheophytes
- Clade: Angiosperms
- Order: Nymphaeales
- Family: Nymphaeaceae
- Genus: Nymphaea
- Subgenus: Nymphaea subg. Anecphya
- Species: N. hastifolia

Binomial name
- Nymphaea hastifolia Domin
- Nymphaea hastifolia is native to the Northern Territory, and Western Australia

Species of water lily

Nymphaea hastifolia is a species of waterlily native to the Northern Territory, and Western Australia.

== Description ==
=== Vegetative characteristics ===
Nymphaea hastifolia is an annual or perennial aquatic herb with globose rhizomes. The elliptical floating leaves with sinuate margins are 20 cm long, and 15 cm wide. The adaxial leaf surface is green, but the abaxial leaf surface displays purple colouration.

=== Generative characteristics ===
The emergent flowers are white. The seeds are ellipsoid or globoid.

== Reproduction ==
=== Generative reproduction ===
Flowering occurs from March to June.

== Taxonomy ==
=== Publication ===
It was first described by Karel Domin in 1925.

=== Type specimen ===
The type specimen was collected by Schultz in Port Darwin, Australia.

=== Placement within Nymphaea ===
It is placed in Nymphaea subgenus Anecphya.

== Etymology ==
The specific epithet hastifolia is derived from hasta, meaning spear, and folium, meaning leaf. It means having spear-shaped leaves.

== Conservation ==
It is not threatened.

== Ecology ==
=== Habitat ===
It occurs in lagoons, peat bogs, seasonally flooded grassland, ephemeral billabongs, creeks, and rivers.

== Use ==
The rhizome, roots, and seeds of Nymphaea hastifolia are used as food.
