= Nymphaea vaporalis =

Conservation status
- Special Least Concern (NCA)

Scientific classification
- Kingdom: Plantae
- Clade: Tracheophytes
- Clade: Angiosperms
- Order: Nymphaeales
- Family: Nymphaeaceae
- Genus: Nymphaea
- Subgenus: Nymphaea subg. Anecphya
- Species: N. vaporalis

Binomial name
- Nymphaea vaporalis S.W.L.Jacobs & Hellq.
- Nymphaea vaporalis is endemic to Queensland, Australia

Species of water lily

Nymphaea vaporalis is a species of waterlily endemic to Queensland, Australia.

== Description ==
=== Vegetative characteristics ===
Nymphaea vaporalis is an annual or perennial species with globose rhizomes. The elliptic-suborbicular, 33 cm long, 28 cm wide leaves have an entire-sinuate margin.

=== Generative characteristics ===
The fragrant, day-flowering, flowers can rise up to 30 cm above the water surface. The 12 cm long, 3.5 cm wide, sepals have an acute apex. The 22-25 cm long, 1.8-2.5 cm wide petals have an acute apex. The androecium consists of 200 yellow stamens with membranous, max. 2.3 cm long filaments. The anthers are 0.8 cm long, and have white appendages on the outer stamens. The gynoecium consists of 18 carpels. The ovary has vestigial sterile lobes. The 4 cm long, 3 cm wide, globose fruit carries glabrous, elongate, 2-2.6 mm long, and 1.5 mm wide seeds. The flowers smell like cinnamon.

== Reproduction ==
=== Generative reproduction ===
In Nymphaea vaporalis, a large percentage of seeds are aborted, but the fully developed seeds are viable.

== Taxonomy ==
=== Publication ===
It was first described by Surrey Wilfrid Laurance Jacobs and Carl Barre Hellquist in 2011.

=== Type specimen ===
The type specimen of Nymphaea vaporalis was collected at an elevation of 287 meters above sea level by Jacobs and Hellquist in North Kennedy, Queensland on th 10th of June 2007.

=== Placement within Nymphaea ===
It is placed in Nymphaea subgenus Confluentes.

=== Hybridisation ===
Nymphaea vaporalis may be of hybrid origin.

== Etymology ==
The specific epithet vaporalis, meaning steam or smoke, is derived from the old steam engine water supply near Mingela, its only known habitat.

== Conservation ==
The NCA status of Nymphaea atrans is Special Least Concern.
