= Frederick Strange =

British natural history collector in Australia (died 1854)

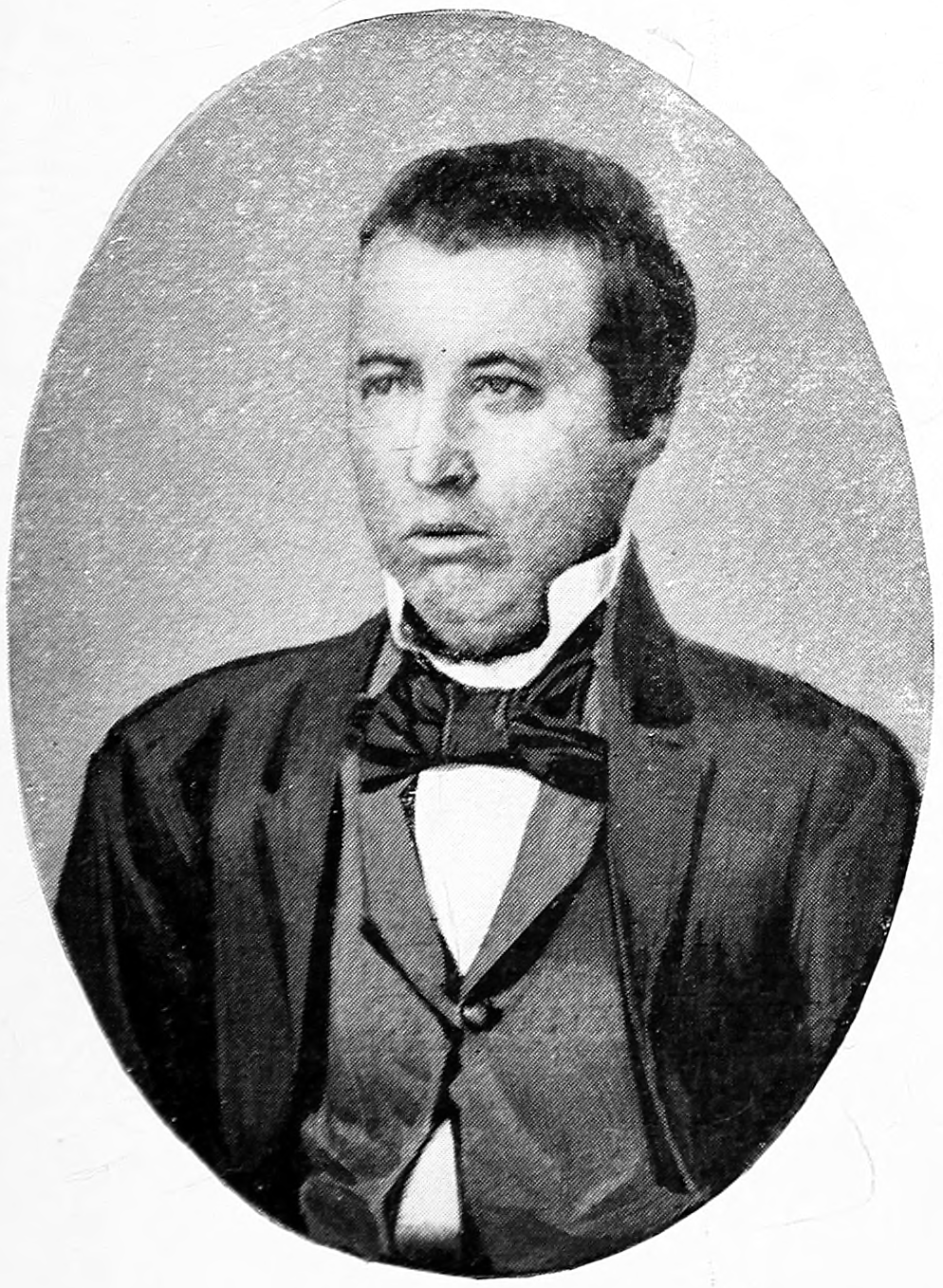
Portrait accompanying Maiden's biography published in the Journal and proceedings of the Royal Society of New South Wales, 1908

Frederick Strange (c. 1826 – 15 October 1854) was a collector of plant and animal specimens during the early colonisation of Australia. He collected bird specimens for John Gould. He was killed in a conflict between his group and natives on South Percy Island. The water lily Nymphaea gigantea was collected by him and sent to England where it was named by William Hooker.

== Life and work ==
Strange was apparently born in Aylsham, in Norfolk, England, tentatively given as 1826 by his earliest biographer although more likely to between 1810 and 1818. He emigrated to South Australia in 1836 aboard the Cygnet, or at least prior to 1838 when he accompanied Charles Sturt on an expedition to the Gawler River. A saltwater water body to which he led the party, from which he had profitably fished sometime earlier, was later named for him as Strange's Creek. Strange supplied specimens to botanists, ornithologists and other workers, including the previously undescribed Prince Albert's lyre-bird Menura alberti, and others used as types for bird species described by John Gould: sooty owl Strix tenebricosa, plumed frogmouth Podargus plumiferus, pale-yellow robin Eopsaltria capito, mangrove honeyeater Ptilotis fasciogularis and rufous shrike-thrush Colluricincla rufogaster.

Strange accompanied John Lort Stokes in 1848 on a voyage to survey New Zealand. He returned to England with his family in 1852, taking with him a substantial collection of specimens. Most of the material that Strange obtained was deposited in English collections and studied by workers in that country, especially in the fields of botany, ornithology and conchology. Notices in contemporary English newspapers described his seeds and specimens when he arrived, crediting him with the introduction to England of the plant Nymphaea gigantea as a living specimen. That species, an aquatic plant with large flowers that was compared to celebrated exotic Victoria amazonica, was then named and described by William Hooker and illustrated by Walter Hood Fitch. A genus of Proteaceae, Strangea, was named by Carl Meissner for this collector.

Strange's own reports on plants and animals were published in the works of Gould and elsewhere, providing information on their habits and habitat. His notes on Australian and New Zealand birds, little known to Europeans, were published via Gould, such as letters read before by the Zoological Society of London in 1847 which gave details of the kakapo and a new species of kiwi. He held species of Ptilonorhynchidae (bowerbirds) in captivity to obverse their elaborate nest building behavior, his report to Gould was quoted by Darwin in his Descent of Man.

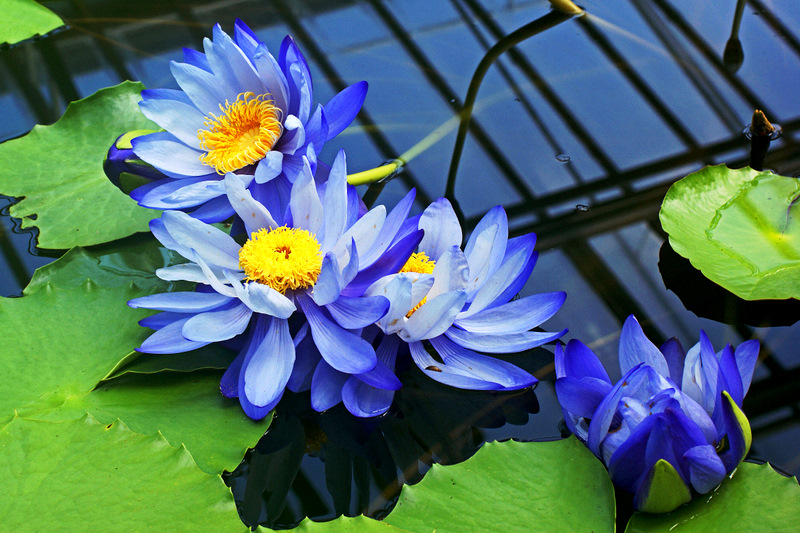
Nymphaea gigantea, introduced to Europe by Strange

He was killed in the Percy Isles off the Queensland coast on 15 October 1854 while leading an expedition to collect specimens. Strange left Brisbane on his ship, the Vision, with his other passengers, the botanist Walter Hill and his assistant Richard Spinks. Deliape (Deliape), an Aboriginal man who would guide the research party, boarded the ship at Moreton Bay. The captain of the ship was George Elphinstone Maitland, who had a crew of four men.

Delaipi had been in the company of Strange, his assistant and two of the crew, when they met with a group of Aboriginal men. A dispute arose between the groups, reportedly over water on the island, and Strange was speared in the leg. Strange removed the weapon and replied by shooting and killing one of the island's residents. Delaipi reported that he was also attacked by the islanders in the violence that ensued and fled the scene in fear of his life. Walter Hill, who had been exploring on his own, returned to their ship late in the day on the island, after Dalaipi had found and warned him of the events that led to the deaths of the rest of the party.

The fate of Strange's party became a sensational story in the newspapers and local folklore, inspiring the poem by George French Angas with the first line "By Savage Hands His Steps Were Stayed!". The death of Frederick Strange was portrayed in the poem's theme and media reports of the time as one of a patriotic hero of science having succumbed to an "untutored native savage". In July 1855 a fund was opened to raise money to support his widow and six children, the youngest of whom was born after Strange's death.

His grandson, Frederick Resolute Strange, provided field notes, letters and other material to early biographers, J. H. Maiden's first notice published in 1908 and H. M. Whittell's more extensive biographical article in 1947. A biographer in 2017 concluded that despite a lack of qualifications found in the other natural history collectors, he became a "fine naturalist and Australian pioneer".
