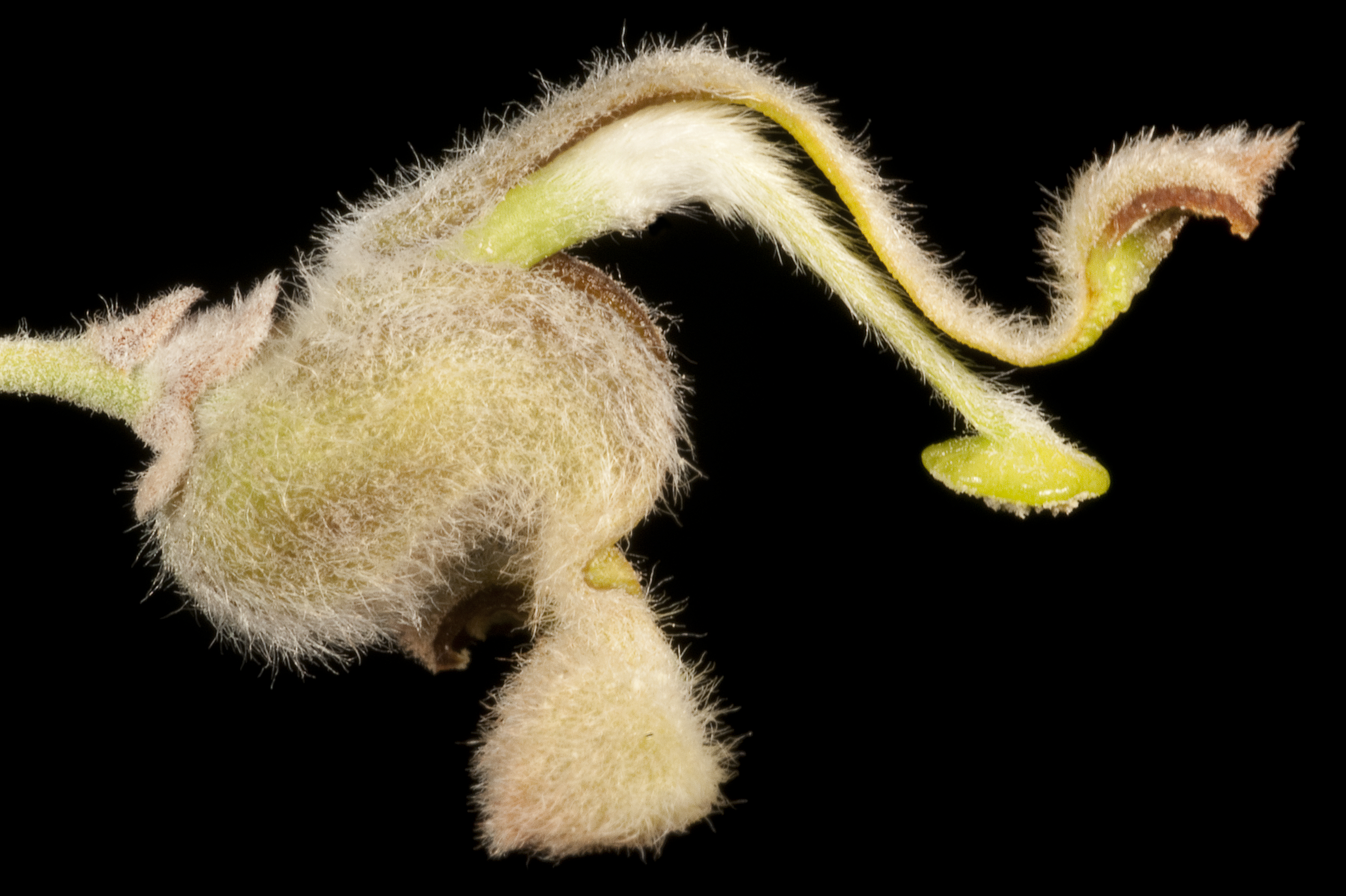

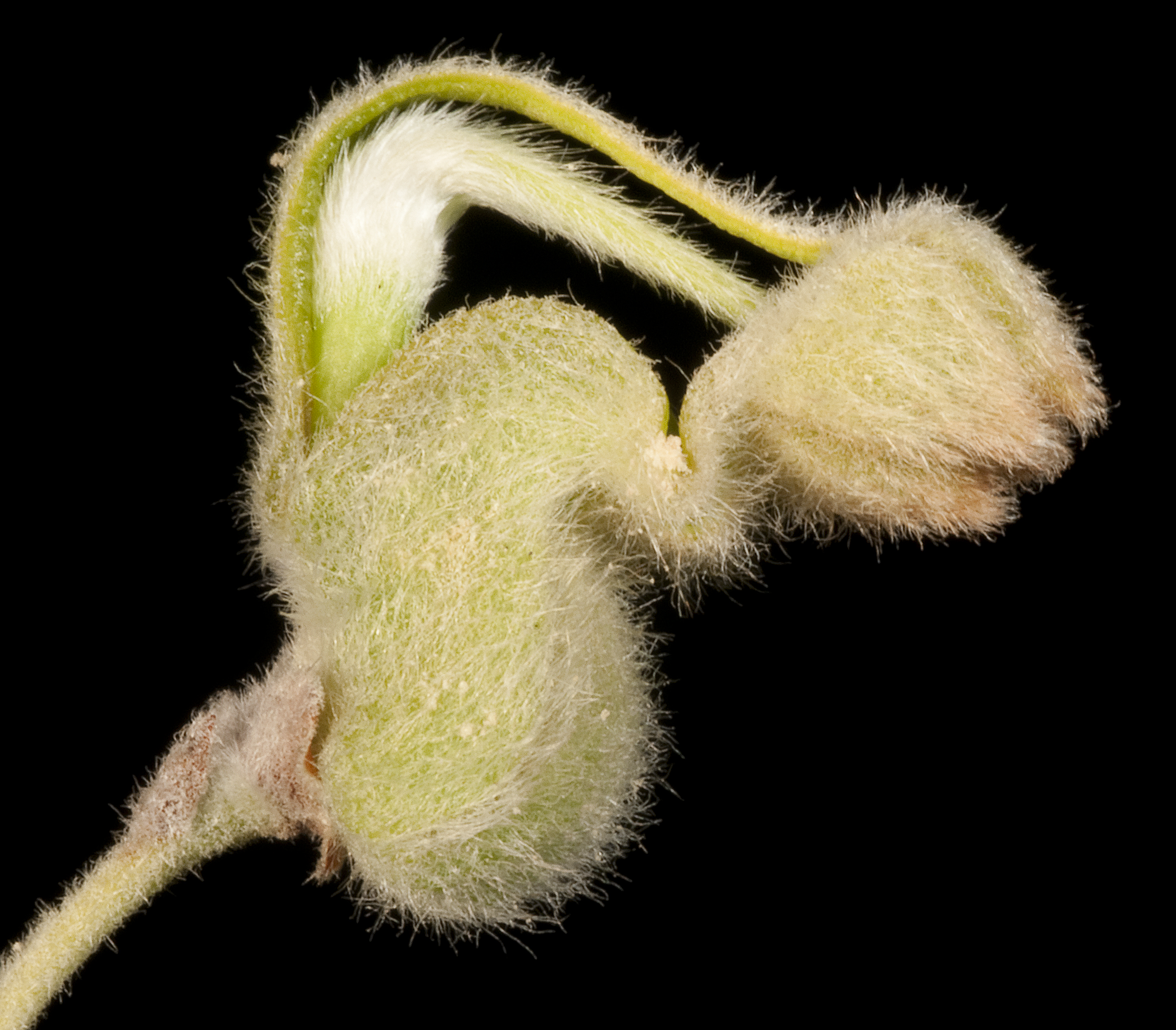

Scientific classification
- Kingdom: Plantae
- Clade: Tracheophytes
- Clade: Angiosperms
- Clade: Eudicots
- Order: Proteales
- Family: Proteaceae
- Genus: Strangea
- Species: S. cynanchicarpa

Binomial name
- Strangea cynanchicarpa (Meisn.) F.Muell.

= Strangea cynanchicarpa =

Species of shrub native to Western Australia

Strangea cynanchicarpa is a shrub of the family Proteaceae native to Western Australia.
