= Nymphaea ondinea subsp. petaloidea =

Scientific classification
- Kingdom: Plantae
- Clade: Embryophytes
- Clade: Tracheophytes
- Clade: Spermatophytes
- Clade: Angiosperms
- Order: Nymphaeales
- Family: Nymphaeaceae
- Genus: Nymphaea
- Subgenus: Nymphaea subg. Anecphya
- Species: N. ondinea
- Subspecies: N. o. subsp. petaloidea

Trinomial name
- Nymphaea ondinea subsp. petaloidea (Kenneally & E.L.Schneid.) Löhne, Wiersema & Borsch
- Nymphaea ondinea subsp. petaloidea is native to the North of the Australian state Western Australia

Synonyms
- Ondinea purpurea subsp. petaloidea Kenneally & E.L.Schneid.

Species of water lily

Nymphaea ondinea subsp. petaloidea is a subspecies of Nymphaea ondinea native to the Northern Territory, and Western Australia.

== Description ==
=== Vegetative characteristics ===
It is a robust, perennial, tuberous herb.

=== Generative characteristics ===
The flowers have 15–33 mm long sepals, and 1–4 (–5) petals. The androecium consists of 27–34 stamens, and the gynoecium consists of 5–10 carpels.

=== Differentiation from Nymphaea ondinea subsp. ondinea ===
Unlike the autonymous subspecies, Nymphaea ondinea subsp. petaloidea flowers possess petals, in addition to a larger flower, more carpels, and more stamens.

== Taxonomy ==
=== Publication ===
It was first published as Ondinea purpurea subsp. petaloidea Kenneally & E.L.Schneid. by Kevin Francis Kenneally and Edward L. Schneider in 1983. It was transferred to the genus Nymphaea L. as Nymphaea ondinea subsp. petaloidea (Kenneally & E.L.Schneid.) Löhne, Wiersema & Borsch by Cornelia Löhne, John Harry Wiersema & Thomas Borsch in 2009. The type specimen was collected by E.L. Schneider in a small, non-perennial tributary to Mitchell River, Mitchell Plateau, North Kimberley, Australia on the 21st of January 1982.

=== Placement within Nymphaea ===
It is placed in Nymphaea subgenus Anecphya.

== Conservation ==
Under the Biodiversity Conservation Act 2016, is classified as a Priority 1: Poorly-known species.

== Ecology ==
=== Habitat ===
It occurs in non-perennial creeks.
