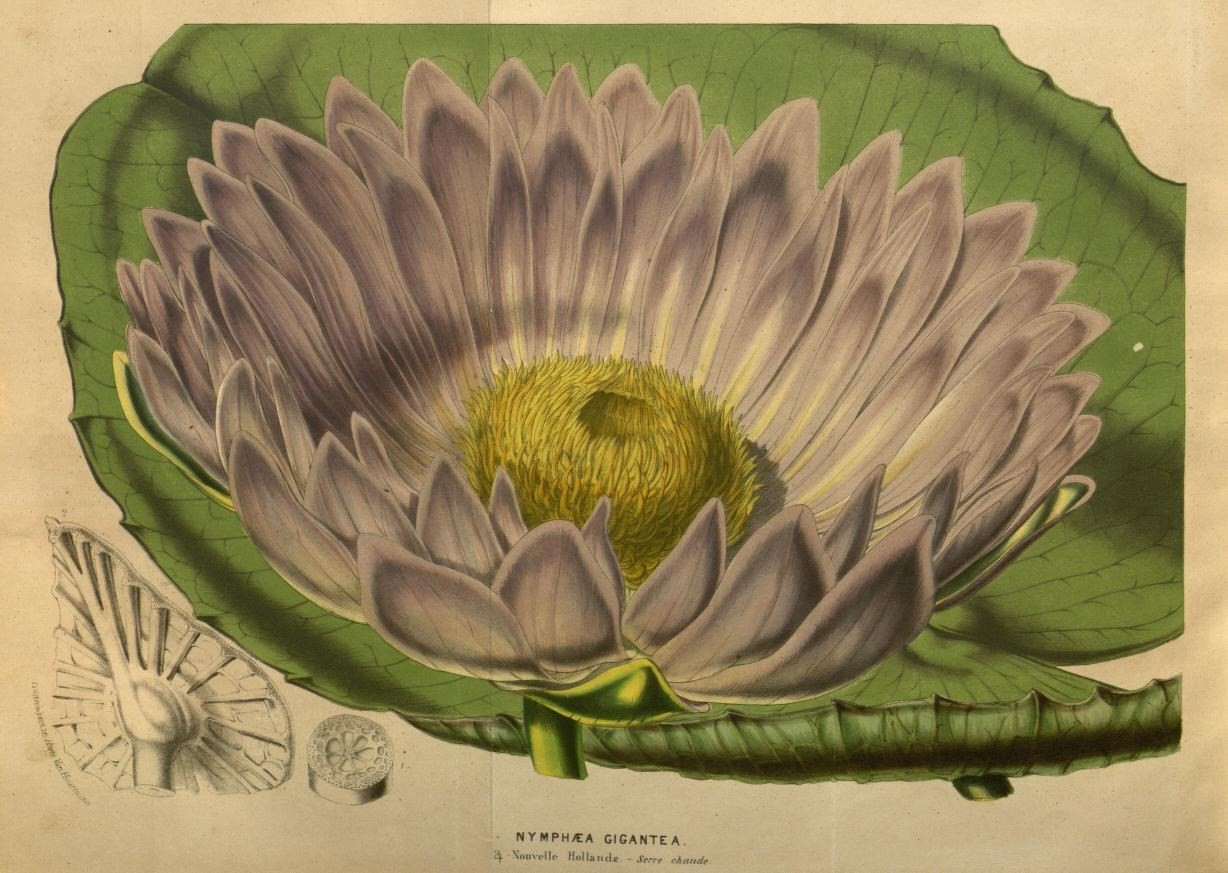
- Botanical illustration of Nymphaea gigantea

Scientific classification
- Kingdom: Plantae
- Clade: Tracheophytes
- Clade: Angiosperms
- Order: Nymphaeales
- Family: Nymphaeaceae
- Genus: Nymphaea
- Subgenus: Nymphaea subg. Anecphya (Casp.) Conard

Type species
- Nymphaea gigantea Hook.

Species
- See here

Synonyms
- Nymphaea subsect. Anecphya Casp.

= Nymphaea subg. Anecphya =

Subgenus of flowering plants

Nymphaea subg. Anecphya is a subgenus of the genus Nymphaea.

== Description ==
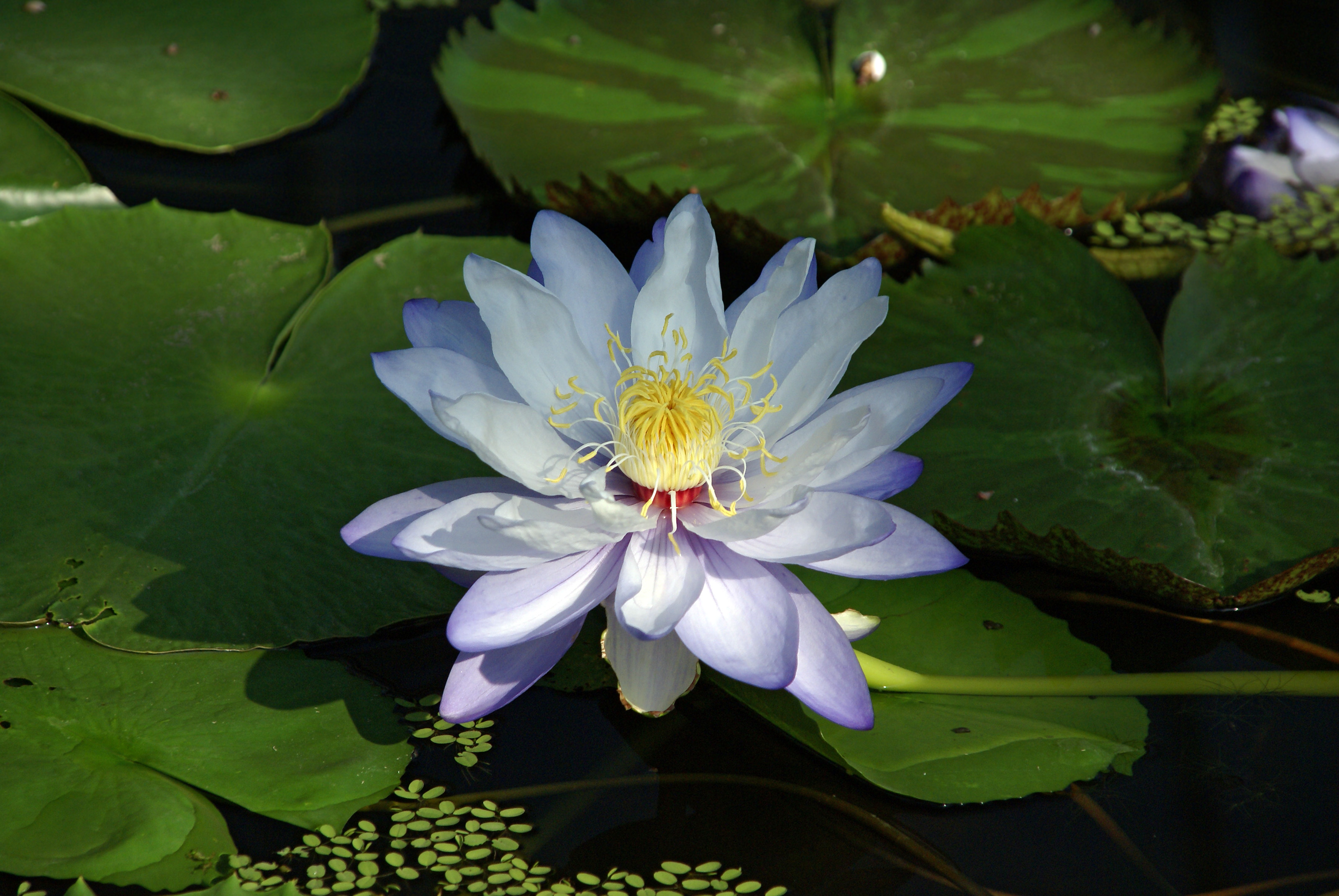
Characteristic separation of petals and stamens in Nymphaea gigantea flower

=== Vegetative characteristics ===
The rhizomes are erect and tuberous. The rhizomes do not produce stolons. The leaves have dentate margins.

=== Generative characteristics ===
The diurnal flowers are large and emergent. In Nymphaea subg. Anecphya s.str. there is a conspicuous gap separating petals from stamens. The flowers have up to 600 stamens. The carpels do not have carpellary appendages.

== Taxonomy ==
=== Publication ===
It was published by Robert Caspary as Nymphaea subsect. Anecphya Casp. in 1888. Later, it was elevated to the subgenus Nymphaea subgen. Anecphya (Casp.) Conard published by Henry Shoemaker Conard in 1905. Part of this subgenus was split off by Surrey Wilfrid Laurance Jacobs in 2007 to create the new subgenus Nymphaea subgenus Confluentes S.W.L.Jacobs.

=== Type species ===
The type species is Nymphaea gigantea Hook.

=== Species ===
- Nymphaea alexii S.W.L.Jacobs & Hellq.
- Nymphaea atrans S.W.L.Jacobs
- Nymphaea carpentariae S.W.L.Jacobs & Hellq.
- Nymphaea elleniae S.W.L.Jacobs
- Nymphaea georginae S.W.L.Jacobs & Hellq.
- Nymphaea gigantea Hook.
- Nymphaea hastifolia Domin
- Nymphaea immutabilis S.W.L.Jacobs
- Nymphaea jacobsii Hellq.
- Nymphaea jacobsii subsp. toomba Hellq.
- Nymphaea kakaduensis Hellq., A.Leu & M.L.Moody
- Nymphaea kimberleyensis (S.W.L.Jacobs) S.W.L.Jacobs & Hellq.
- Nymphaea lukei S.W.L.Jacobs & Hellq.
- Nymphaea macrosperma Merr. & L.M.Perry
- Nymphaea noelae S.W.L.Jacobs & Hellq.
- Nymphaea ondinea Löhne, Wiersema & Borsch
- Nymphaea ondinea subsp. petaloidea (Kenneally & E.L.Schneid.) Löhne, Wiersema & Borsch
- Nymphaea vaporalis S.W.L.Jacobs & Hellq.
- Nymphaea violacea Lehm.

== Distribution ==
Nymphaea subg. Anecphya has an Australasian distribution.

== Ecology ==
=== Habitat ===
Species of this subgenus occur in lagoons, lakes, ponds, creeks, artificial dams, and billabongs.

== Horticulture ==
Species of this subgenus are uncommon in cultivation, as they are more difficult to grow compared to the Nymphaea species of other subgenera. It has been used in intersubgeneric hybridisation with Nymphaea subg. Brachyceras.
