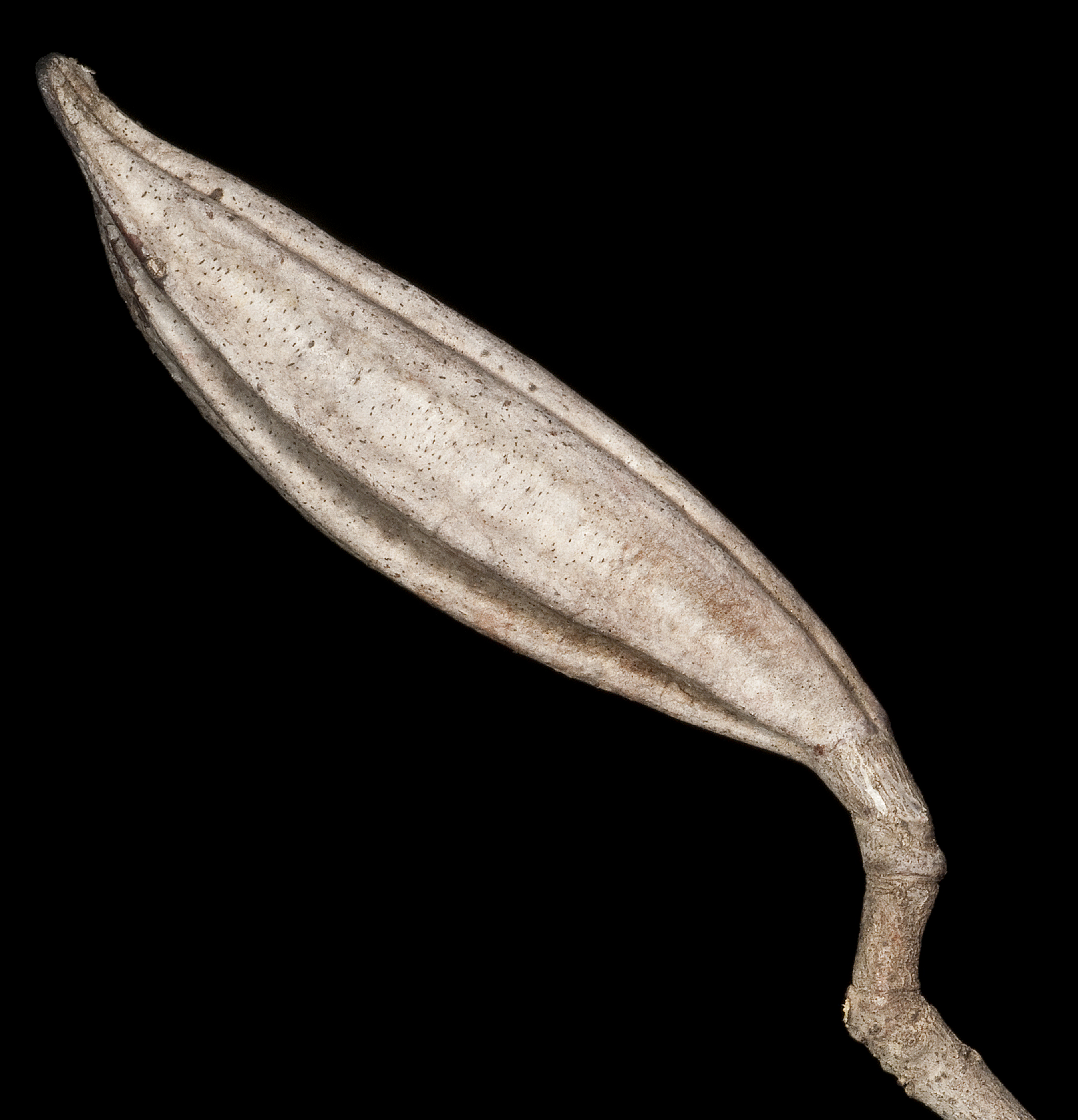
- Strangea cynanchicarpa

Scientific classification
- Kingdom: Plantae
- Clade: Tracheophytes
- Clade: Angiosperms
- Clade: Eudicots
- Order: Proteales
- Family: Proteaceae
- Subfamily: Grevilleoideae
- Tribe: Embothrieae
- Subtribe: Stenocarpinae
- Genus: Strangea; Meisn.

Species
- See text

= Strangea =

Genus of shrubs native to Australia

Strangea is a genus of three species of shrubs in the family Proteaceae native to Australia.

The type species Strangea linearis was collected by Frederick Strange, at Moreton Bay, Queensland, and described by Carl Meissner in 1855, the author giving an honour to Strange in the naming of the new genus.

== Species ==
- Strangea linearis
- Strangea stenocarpoides
- Strangea cynanchicarpa
