= Nymphaea jacobsii subsp. toomba =

Scientific classification
- Kingdom: Plantae
- Clade: Tracheophytes
- Clade: Angiosperms
- Order: Nymphaeales
- Family: Nymphaeaceae
- Genus: Nymphaea
- Species: N. jacobsii
- Subspecies: N. j. subsp. toomba

Trinomial name
- Nymphaea jacobsii subsp. toomba Hellq.
- Nymphaea jacobsii subsp. toomba is endemic to Queensland, Australia.

Species of plant

Nymphaea jacobsii subsp. toomba is a subspecies of Nymphaea jacobsii endemic to Queensland, Australia.

== Description ==
=== Vegetative characteristics ===
Nymphaea jacobsii subsp. toomba is a rhizomatous, annual or perennial herb with a globose to elongate, up to 25 cm long rhizome. The suborbicular to broadly elliptic, petiolate, stipulate leaf with a finely dentate margin is 29–75 cm long, and 27–35 cm wide.

=== Generative characteristics ===
The relatively smaller, blue flowers have green, 4.2–8.5 cm long, and 4.2–6.0 cm wide sepals with an obtuse apex. The 12–20 lanceolate, white and blue petals with an acute apex are 5–8.5 cm long, and 2.5–4 cm wide. The androecium consists of 150–300 yellow stamens. The gynoecium consists of 12–25 carpels. The globose, (2.5–)4–7 cm wide fruit bears large, hairy, ovoid, 2.6–5(–6) mm long, and 2–3 mm wide seeds.

== Taxonomy ==
It was described by Carl Barre Hellquist in 2011. The type specimen was collected by S. Jacobs and C. B. Hellquist in 'Toomba' Creek, North Kennedy, Queensland, Australia on the 11th of June 2007. It is placed in the subgenus Nymphaea subg. Anecphya.

=== Etymology ===
The subspecific epithet toomba refers to "Toomba", the property of Ernest and Robyn Bassingthwaighte, and honours their friendship with Hellquist.

== Distribution ==
It is endemic to Queensland, Australia.
