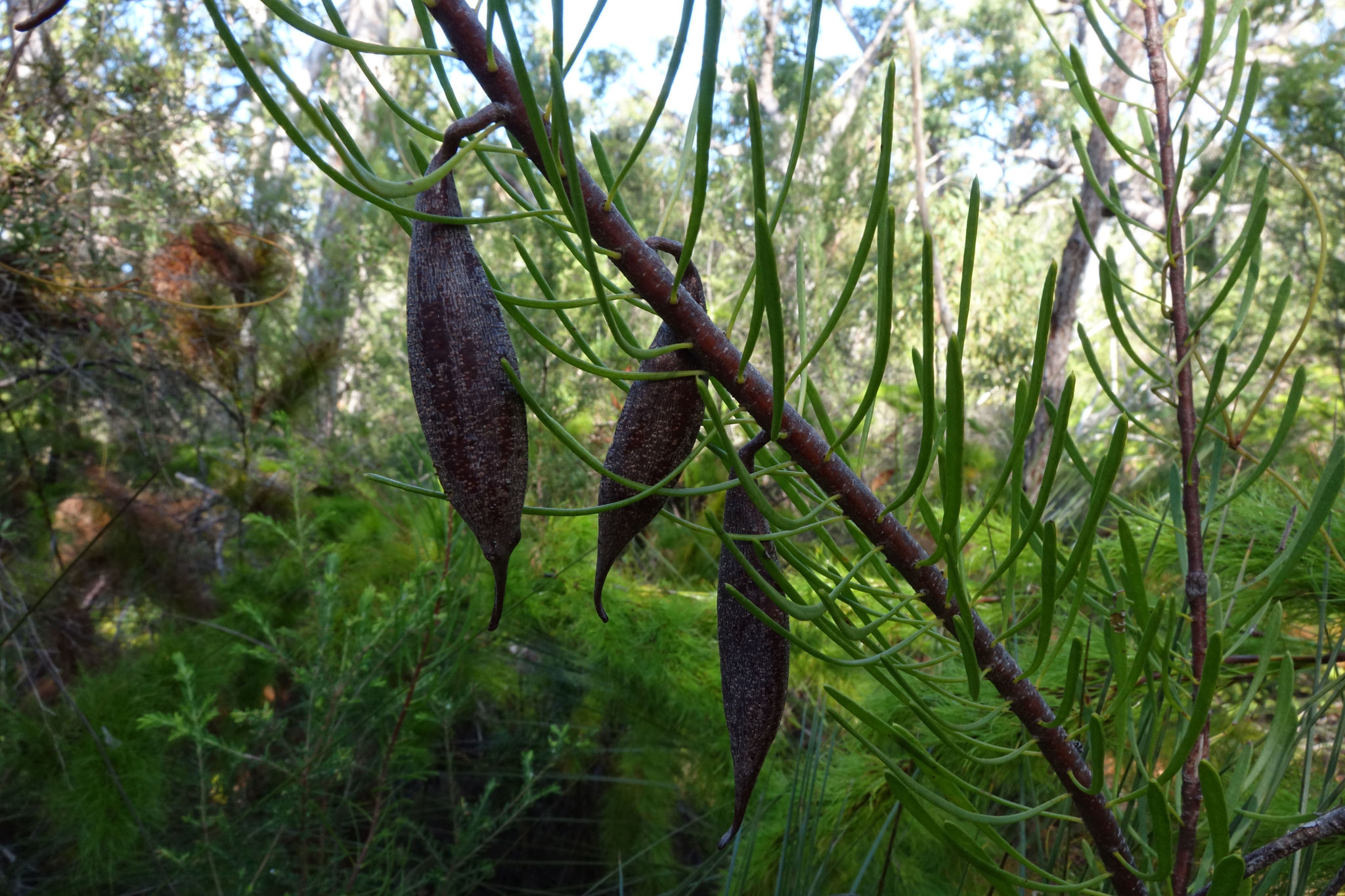

Scientific classification
- Kingdom: Plantae
- Clade: Tracheophytes
- Clade: Angiosperms
- Clade: Eudicots
- Order: Proteales
- Family: Proteaceae
- Genus: Strangea
- Species: S. linearis

Binomial name
- Strangea linearis Meisn.

= Strangea linearis =

Species of shrub native to eastern Australia

Strangea linearis is a shrub of the family Proteaceae native to eastern Australia.
