= Strangea stenocarpoides =

Scientific classification
- Kingdom: Plantae
- Clade: Tracheophytes
- Clade: Angiosperms
- Clade: Eudicots
- Order: Proteales
- Family: Proteaceae
- Genus: Strangea
- Species: S. stenocarpoides

Binomial name
- Strangea stenocarpoides (Benth.) C.A.Gardner

Species of shrub native to Western Australia

Strangea stenocarpoides is a shrub of the family Proteaceae native to Western Australia.
