= Nymphaea elleniae =

Conservation status
- Special Least Concern (NCA)

Scientific classification
- Kingdom: Plantae
- Clade: Tracheophytes
- Clade: Angiosperms
- Order: Nymphaeales
- Family: Nymphaeaceae
- Genus: Nymphaea
- Subgenus: Nymphaea subg. Anecphya
- Species: N. elleniae

Binomial name
- Nymphaea elleniae S.W.L.Jacobs
- Nymphaea elleniae is native to North Queensland, Australia, and Papua New Guinea

Species of water lily

Nymphaea elleniae is a species of waterlily native to Papua New Guinea, and North Queensland, Australia.

== Description ==
=== Vegetative characteristics ===
Nymphaea elleniae is a perennial plant with elongate rhizomes. Mature floating leaves are 22 cm long, and 18 cm wide.

=== Generative characteristics ===
The flowers, which are only open during daytime, can extend up to 20 cm above the water surface. The four 7 cm long sepals have an acute to obtuse apex. The 25 lanceolate petals have an acute to obtuse apex. The androecium consists of 100 stamens. The gynoecium consists of 11-22 carpels. The globose, 2.5 cm wide fruit bears numerous glabrous, elliptical, 1.75-2.5 mm long, 1-1.5 mm wide seeds.

== Reproduction ==
=== Generative reproduction ===
Flowering occurs from April to December.

== Taxonomy ==
=== Publication ===
It was first described by Surrey Wilfrid Laurance Jacobs in 1992.

=== Type specimen ===
The type specimen was collected by S. Jacobs & J. Clarkson in Jardine River, Queensland, Australia on the 6th of August 1987.

=== Placement within Nymphaea ===
It is placed in Nymphaea subgenus Anecphya.

== Etymology ==
The specific epithet elleniae refers to Ellen A. Jacobs, the daughter of Surrey Wilfrid Laurance Jacobs.

== Conservation ==
The NCA status of Nymphaea elleniae is Special Least Concern.

== Ecology ==
=== Habitat ===
It is found in up to 5 m deep waters.
