= Nymphaea ondinea =

Scientific classification
- Kingdom: Plantae
- Clade: Tracheophytes
- Clade: Angiosperms
- Order: Nymphaeales
- Family: Nymphaeaceae
- Genus: Nymphaea
- Subgenus: Nymphaea subg. Anecphya
- Species: N. ondinea

Binomial name
- Nymphaea ondinea Löhne, Wiersema & Borsch

Subspecies
- Nymphaea ondinea subsp. ondinea; Nymphaea ondinea subsp. petaloidea (Kenneally & E.L.Schneid.) Löhne, Wiersema & Borsch
- Nymphaea ondinea is native to Western Australia

Synonyms
- Ondinea purpurea Hartog

Species of water lily

Nymphaea ondinea is an aquatic plant in the family Nymphaeaceae native to northwestern Australia.

== Description ==
=== Vegetative characteristics ===
It is a perennial, tuberous plant with 1–6 oblong, 1.5–2.5 cm long, and 1–2 cm wide tubers. The contractile roots are 1–1.5 mm wide. The plant has floating or submerged leaves. The submerged leaves with undulate leaf margins are 6–24 cm long. The upper surface of the submerged leaves is green, and the lower surface is dark blue. The floating leaves are 7 cm long, and 2 cm wide.

=== Generative characteristics ===
The pink to purple, solitary flower with a terete, 3–6 mm peduncle emerges up to 10–20 cm above water surface. The flowers have four 9–33 mm long sepals. The petals can be absent or present. The androeceum consists of 15–34 stamens. The gynoecium consists of 3–14 carpels.

== Taxonomy ==
It was first collected in 1921 by Charles Gardner, but it was not then seen to be a new species. It was first published as Ondinea purpurea Hartog by Cornelis den Hartog in 1970. It was transferred to the genus Nymphaea L. as Nymphaea ondinea Löhne, Wiersema & Borsch published by Cornelia Löhne, John Harry Wiersema, and Thomas Borsch in 2009 (the option of retaining the same epithet, as Nymphaea purpurea, was not available, as this combination had been used before for another species). The type specimen was collected by W. Leutert North-East of Kalimburu, Kimberley district, Western Australia on the 15th of April 1968. It is placed in Nymphaea subg. Anecphya.

=== Etymology ===
The species name ondinea is derived from the name of the water nymph in the 1958 ballet Ondine.

== Ecology ==
It occurs in sandstone streams.

== Conservation ==
Nymphaea ondinea is not threatened. However, its subspecies Nymphaea ondinea subsp. petaloidea is classified as a Priority 1: Poorly-known species under the Biodiversity Conservation Act 2016.

== Cultivation ==
The attempts to grow Nymphaea ondinea have been met with low levels of success.
