= Nymphaea kimberleyensis =

Scientific classification
- Kingdom: Plantae
- Clade: Tracheophytes
- Clade: Angiosperms
- Order: Nymphaeales
- Family: Nymphaeaceae
- Genus: Nymphaea
- Subgenus: Nymphaea subg. Anecphya
- Species: N. kimberleyensis

Binomial name
- Nymphaea kimberleyensis (S.W.L.Jacobs) S.W.L.Jacobs & Hellq.
- Nymphaea kimberleyensis is endemic to Western Australia

Synonyms
- Nymphaea immutabilis subsp. kimberleyensis S.W.L.Jacobs

Species of water lily

Nymphaea kimberleyensis is a species of waterlily endemic to Western Australia.

== Description ==
=== Vegetative characteristics ===
Nymphaea kimberleyensis has swollen, 12 cm long rhizomes. The leaves have a dentate margin.

=== Generative characteristics ===
The sepals are 9–18.5 cm long. The 9.5-14.5 cm long petals are blue, but display white colouration at the base. The androecium consists of 200 stamens. The gynoecium consists of 15-20 carpels. The glabrous seeds have only been observed in an immature state. The fruit does not develop to maturity.

== Reproduction ==
=== Generative reproduction ===
Flowering occurs from March to June. Only immature seeds have been observed. The fruit fails to reach full maturity.

== Taxonomy ==
=== Publication ===
It was first described by Surrey Wilfrid Laurance Jacobs as Nymphaea immutabilis subsp. kimberleyensis S.W.L.Jacobs in 1992 . Later, it was elevated to a separate species Nymphaea kimberleyensis (S.W.L.Jacobs) S.W.L.Jacobs & Hellq. by Surrey Wilfrid Laurance Jacobs and Carl Barre Hellquist in 2011.

=== Type specimen ===
The type specimen was collected by S. Jacobs, and P. Wilson in the Kimberly region of Western Australia on the 23rd of May 1988.

=== Placement within Nymphaea ===
It is placed in Nymphaea subgenus Anecphya.

=== Natural hybridisation ===
Nymphaea kimberleyensis may be of hybrid origin.

== Etymology ==
The specific epithet kimberleyensis indicates this species origin in Kimberly, Australia.

== Conservation ==
It is a rare species.

== Ecology ==
=== Habitat ===
It is found in small water courses with less intense flows, and in a lagoon experiencing seasonal droughts.
