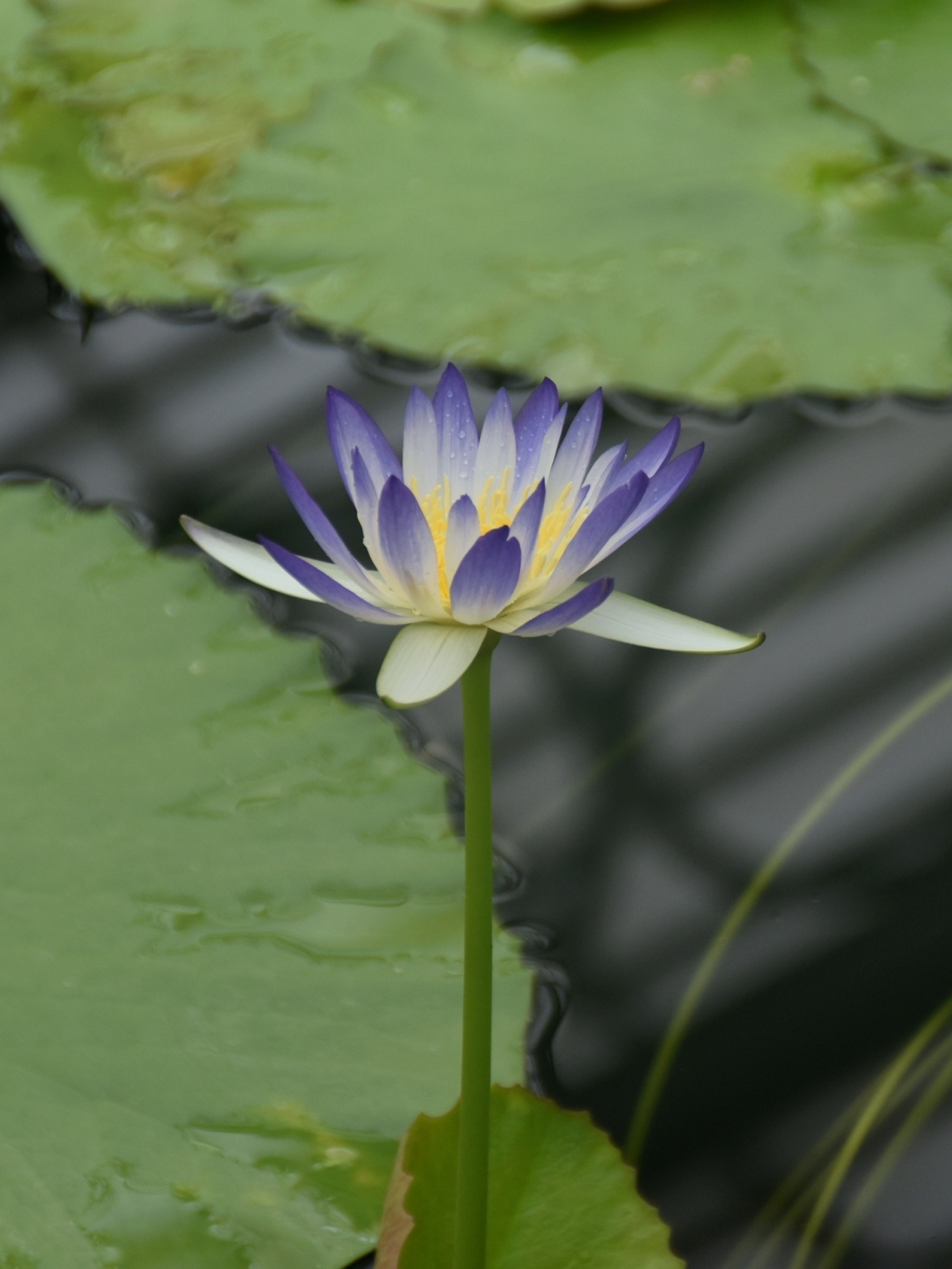
- Nymphaea lukei in cultivation at the Royal Botanic Gardens, Kew

Scientific classification
- Kingdom: Plantae
- Clade: Tracheophytes
- Clade: Angiosperms
- Order: Nymphaeales
- Family: Nymphaeaceae
- Genus: Nymphaea
- Subgenus: Nymphaea subg. Anecphya
- Species: N. lukei

Binomial name
- Nymphaea lukei S.W.L.Jacobs & Hellq.
- Nymphaea lukei is endemic to Western Australia

= Nymphaea lukei =

Species of water lily

Nymphaea lukei is a species of waterlily endemic to Western Australia.

== Description ==
=== Vegetative characteristics ===
Nymphaea lukei is an annual or perennial aquatic plant with globose, 2-2.5 cm wide rhizomes. The elliptic, petiolate, 9.7–28 long, and 7.2–25 wide leaves have a sinuate margin.

=== Generative characteristics ===
The fragrant flowers extend up to 30 cm above the water surface. The green sepals with blue margins towards the acute apex are 3.5–6.5 cm long, and 0.5–2.5 cm wide. The 15-30 white to blue, lanceolate petals are 3–6 cm long, and 1.3–2 cm wide. The androecium consists of 75–250 yellow stamens. The gynoecium consists of 16–30 carpels. The globose, 1.5–3 cm long, and 1.5–2.5 cm wide fruit bears elongated, 2.1–2.5 mm long, and 1.8–1.9 mm wide seeds with 0.03–0.06 mm long trichomes, and verrucose projections.

== Reproduction ==
=== Generative reproduction ===
Flowering occurs towards the end of the wet season, and continues within the dry season.

== Taxonomy ==
=== Publication ===
It was first described by Surrey Wilfrid Laurance Jacobs and Carl Barre Hellquist in 2011.

=== Type specimen ===
The type specimen was collected by S. Jacobs in Dampier, Western Australia on the 2nd of May 2008.

=== Placement within Nymphaea ===
It is placed in Nymphaea subgenus Confluentes.

== Etymology ==
The specific epithet lukei is named after Luke Jaden Fussell, the grandson of Surrey Wilfrid Laurance Jacobs.

== Ecology ==
=== Habitat ===
It occurs in pools, creeks, and rivers.
