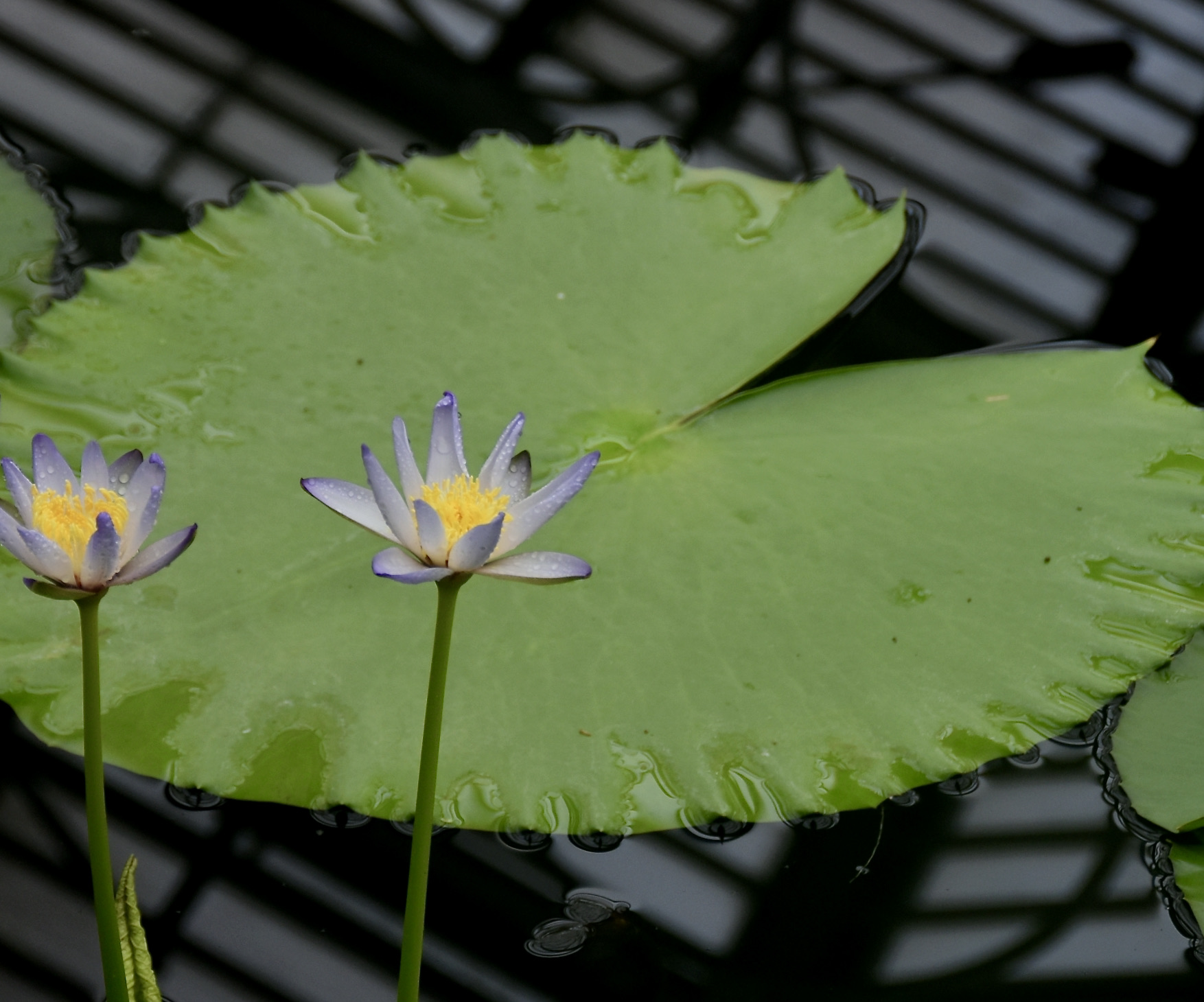

Conservation status
- Special Least Concern (NCA)

Scientific classification
- Kingdom: Plantae
- Clade: Tracheophytes
- Clade: Angiosperms
- Order: Nymphaeales
- Family: Nymphaeaceae
- Genus: Nymphaea
- Subgenus: Nymphaea subg. Anecphya
- Species: N. macrosperma

Binomial name
- Nymphaea macrosperma Merr. & L.M.Perry

Synonyms
- Nymphaea dictyophlebia Merr. & L.M.Perry

= Nymphaea macrosperma =

Species of water lily

Nymphaea macrosperma is an aquatic annual or perennial flowering plant in the family Nymphaeaceae. It is native to Australia and New Guinea.

== Description ==
=== Vegetative characteristics ===
Nymphaea macrosperma is an aquatic annual or rhizomatous herbaceous perennial, with rounded rhizomes that lack stolons. The glabrous, orbicular, elliptic or suborbicular leaves with a dentate margin are 17–38 cm long, and 15–31 cm wide. The abaxial leaf surface has a strong midrib and 6 palmately arranged primary veins, which are reticulate towards the leaf margin. The petioles are up to 2.5 m long, and 2-4 mm wide.

=== Generative characteristics ===
The 6–7 cm wide, diurnal flowers extend above the water surface. The four oblong sepals with a rounded apex are 25-55 mm long, and 9-25 mm wide. The 10–18(–22) white, blue, or purple, oblanceolate to spathulate petals have an obtuse apex. There is a conspicuous gap between petals and stamens. The androecium consists of 150–200 stamens. The gynoecium consists of 10–13 carpels. The 4 cm wide fruit bears oblong to ovoid, hairy, 3–4.5 mm long, and 2–3 mm wide seeds.

== Taxonomy ==
=== Publication ===
It was published by Elmer Drew Merrill and Lily May Perry in 1942. In the same publication, the species was described a second time as Nymphaea dictyophlebia Merr. & L.M.Perry, which is a synonym of Nymphaea macrosperma Merr. & L.M.Perry.

=== Type specimen ===
The type specimen was collected by LJ Brass in Lake Daviumbu, New Guinea (British New Guinea) in August 1936.

=== Position within Nymphaea ===
It is placed in Nymphaea subgenus Anecphya.

== Etymology ==
The specific epithet macrosperma means large-seeded.

== Ecology ==
=== Habitat ===
It occurs in up to 2.5 m deep stagnant or flowing water in lagoons, swamps, billabongs, and drainage channels on clay substrates. It can occur in slightly brackish water.

== Conservation ==
The NCA status of Nymphaea macrosperma is Special Least Concern (SL). Under the Biodiversity Conservation Act 2016, it is classified as Not threatened.

== Uses ==
The plant is a traditional Aboriginal bushfood. The seeds are usually described as "sweet like a pea" and are eaten for lunch.
