= Will Hindle =

Will "William Mayo" Hindle (December 29, 1929 – April 7, 1987) was an independent American filmmaker of personal visual 16mm movies.

From 1958 to 1976, he made ten 16 mm motion pictures. He employed complex rear-projection rephotography, slow motion, and subtle tinting techniques in his work. His movies have been widely praised for their astonishing cinematic techniques and deep personal feeling.

== Biography ==
Hindle was born in Shreveport, Louisiana on December 29, 1929 and later attended Burbank High School, San Francisco, CA and Stanford University, Palo Alto, CA.

He served two tours as a Sergeant in the United States Army Air Force. During the first tour, he worked on the U.S. edition of the Stars & Stripes and was given his own cartoon feature. The second tour, he served as the Editor of the North African edition. In between military tours, Will was employed by Walt Disney Studios and was, at that time, the youngest animator to have ever worked for the company.

Beginning in the late 1950s with Non-Catholicam and Pastorale d'Ete, he began crafting his uniquely beautiful cinematic motion pictures. He financed his personal work by making 150 short TV programs for CBS / Westinghouse which were all aired nationally on their PM West/PM East show. His major accomplishments include Chinese Firedrill, Watersmith, Billabong, Pasteur3, 29: 'Merci, Merci', and Saint Flournoy Lobos-Logos and the Eastern Europe Fetus Taxing Japan Brides in West Coast Places Sucking Alabama Air.

Hindle courted by the new University of South Florida in 1972. Their stated view of motion picture film as an art form and affirmations of the single author approach appealed to Will. He joined the faculty, teaching in Tampa until 1985.

During his lifetime, Hindle taught students about the basics of film making, art, and about life, producing a number of strong prot'eg'ees, including college professors, film artists/moving media artists, documentarians, script writers and fiction writers, along with artists in many other mediums.

His motion pictures won several awards at festivals such as Ann Arbor, Kenyon and Kent State Festivals, San Francisco Int'l Film Festival, Barn Gallery in Maine, Foothill College Film Festival, and the American Film Festival in New York. He also received invitational tributes internationally from the Moscow Film Festival, Cannes Film Festival, and Canadian National Film Festival in Montreal. And for a time, 3 of his motion pictures were distributed by Time-Life.

== Preservation ==
The Academy Film Archive has preserved several of Will Hindle's films, including "Later That Same Night," "Pastorale d'Ete," and "Trekkerriff."

== Filmography ==
1958 Pastorale d'Ete 9 minutes Award: SF Int'l Film Festival

1957/1963 NON Catholicam 10 minutes Has never been placed in competition.

1966 29: 'Merci, Merci' 30 minutes Awards: Kenyon and Kent State Festivals; Ann Arbor Film Festival

1967 FFFTCM 5 minutes

1968 Chinese Firedrill 25 minutes Awards: First Prize, Ann Arbor Film Festival; First Prize, Barn Gallery, Maine; First Prize, SF Int'l Film Festival; First Prize, Foothill College Film Festival

1969 Watersmith 32 minutes Awards: First Prize, American Film Festival, NY; Canadian National Film Festival, Montreal Invitational tributes: Cannes Film Festival; Int'l Moscow Film Festival

1969 Billabong 9 minutes

1970 Saint Flournoy Lobos-Logos and the Eastern Europe Fetus Taxing Japan Brides in West Coast Places Sucking Alabama Air 12 minutes

1971 Later That Same Night 10 minutes

1976 Pasteur³ 22 minutes

1984 Trekkerriff 9 minutes - never completed 2nd (final) edit.
