= Mary Grant Bruce =

Australian children's writer and journalist

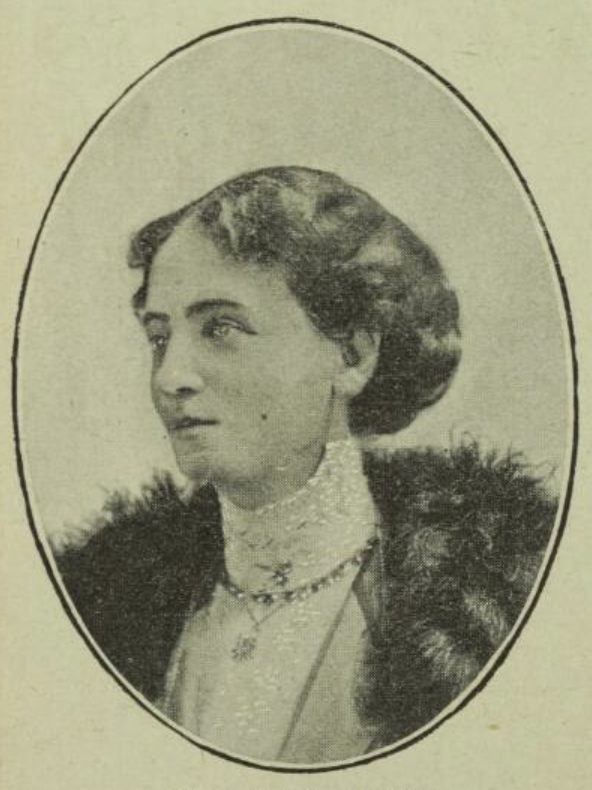
- Mary Grant Bruce in 1912
- Born: Minnie Grant Bruce; 24 May 1878; Gippsland, Victoria, Australia
- Died: 2 July 1958 (aged 80); Bexhill-on-Sea, England
- Education: Miss Estelle Beausire's Ladies High School
- Occupations: Author; Journalist
- Notable work: the Billabong series

Mary Grant Bruce (born Minnie Grant Bruce, 24 May 1878 – 2 July 1958), was an Australian children's author and journalist. While all her thirty-seven books enjoyed popular success in Australia and overseas, particularly in the United Kingdom, she was most famous for the Billabong series, focussing on the adventures of the Linton family on Billabong Station in Victoria and in England and Ireland during World War I.

Her writing was considered influential in forming concepts of Australian national identity, especially in relation to visions of the Bush. It was characterised by fierce patriotism, vivid descriptions of the beauties and dangers of the Australian landscape, and humorous, colloquial dialogue celebrating the art of yarning. Her books were also notable and influential through championing of what Bruce held up as the quintessentially Australian Bush values of independence, hard physical labour (for women and children as well as men), mateship, the ANZAC spirit and Bush hospitality against more decadent, self-centred or stolid urban and British values. Her books simultaneously celebrated and mourned the gradual settlement, clearing and development of the Australian wilderness by Europeans.

== Biography ==
The close descendant of Irish and Welsh Australians and the fourth of a family of five, Mary Grant Bruce, born in Gippsland, Victoria as Minnie Grant Bruce, was the daughter of Eyre Lewis Bruce and Mary (Minnie) Atkinson Whittakers.

After being educated at Miss Estelle Beausire's Ladies High School, Bruce worked as a secretary before establishing a career as a journalist, poet and writer for Australian magazines. In 1903 she helped form the Writer's Club, which later was submerged into the Lyceum Club. A Little Bush Maid, her first major success, was originally published as a serial in the children's page of the Leader. Its success enabled her to work as a full-time writer and journalist, and spawned the Billabong series.

In 1913 Bruce visited London, where she met and became engaged to her distant cousin and fellow writer Major George Evans Bruce. She returned to Australia, where they were married and had two sons, Jonathan and Patrick, and a daughter, Mary, who died shortly after birth. On the outbreak of World War I she stayed in County Cork, Ireland for the duration of the war, while her husband served. Her 1916 novel Jim and Wally contains one of the first accounts of Australian soldiers facing gas attacks on the Western Front.

Once peace was declared, they returned to Australia, where she briefly acted as the editor of Women's World. From 1927 to 1939, and following the death of her younger son in a shooting accident, Bruce, her husband and their surviving child, Jonathan, travelled in Europe, before returning yet again to Australia.

During World War II, Bruce worked for the Australian Imperial Force Women's Association. Following her husband's death in 1949, Bruce returned for the last time to England, to spend the rest of her life there. She died in Bexhill and was cremated at Hastings.

Maurice Saxby, "the doyen of critical commentators on Australian Children's Literature" said that "what Ethel Turner did for the city family, Mary Grant Bruce did for the bush family."

An English designer of warplanes, concerned that Australian pilots would be too tall to fit in the cockpits, asked his daughter for the heights of Bruce's characters Jim Linton and Wally Meadows.

She was posthumously inducted into the Victorian Honour Roll of Women in 2002.

== Journalistic career ==
Bruce was a contributor to many magazines, including Blackwood's Magazine, the Morning Post, the Daily Mail, Windsor Magazine, Cassell's Magazine, the Strand, The Argus (Melbourne ), The Melbourne Age, The Melbourne Herald, the Australasian, the Leader, The Sydney Morning Herald, The Sydney Mail, the Lone Hand, the Auckland Weekly Press, Woman's World, the West Australian and the British Australasian. She claimed to have written on every subject save that of dress. Bruce edited Woman's World for six months in 1926.

== Novels ==
=== The Billabong Series ===
This series was published by Ward, Lock & Co. of London and Melbourne.

- "A Little Bush Maid". digital.library.upenn.edu. 1910.
- "Mates at Billabong". 1911.
- Norah of Billabong (1913)
- From Billabong to London (1915)
- Jim and Wally (1916)
- Captain Jim (1919)
- Back to Billabong (1921)
- Billabong's Daughter (1924)
- Billabong Adventurers (1927)
- Bill of Billabong (1931)
- Billabong's Luck (1933)
- Wings Above Billabong (1935)
- Billabong Gold (1937)
- Son of Billabong (1939)
- Billabong Riders (1942)

=== Other popular works ===
- Glen Eyre (1912)
- Timothy in Bushland (1912)
- Grays Hollow (1914)
- Possum (1917)
- Dick (1918)
- Dick Lester of Kurrajong (1920)
- Rossiters Farm (1920)
- The Cousin from Town (1922)
- Stone Axe of Burkamuka (1922)
- The Twins of Emu Plains (1923)
- House of the Eagle (1925)
- Hugh Standford's Luck (1925)
- Robin (1926)
- Tower Rooms (1926)
- Anderson's Jo (1927)
- Golden Fiddles (1928)
- The Happy Traveller (1929)
- Road to Adventure (1932)
- Seahawk (1934)
- Circus Ring (1936)
- Told By Peter (1938)
- Peter & Co (1940)
- Karalta (1941)
- Peculiar Honeymoon (1986)

Golden Fiddles was made into a television miniseries by the South Australian Film Corporation in 1991.

Peter & Co was one of four books selected by Australian children's author John Marsden for the John Marsden presents Australian Children's classics imprint.

== Controversies ==
Some of Bruce's earlier works are considered to have had offensive and dated content, particularly in regards to racial stereotypes of Aboriginal Australians and Chinese and Irish immigrants, and her earlier belief in the theory of Social Darwinism. More recent reprints of the Billabong series have been edited to remove controversial material.

This footnote appears in the Afterword of all the Angus and Robertson Blue Gum Classics series of reprints (beginning with "A Little Bush Maid" reprinted in 1992). The Afterword is written by Barbara Ker Wilson.
