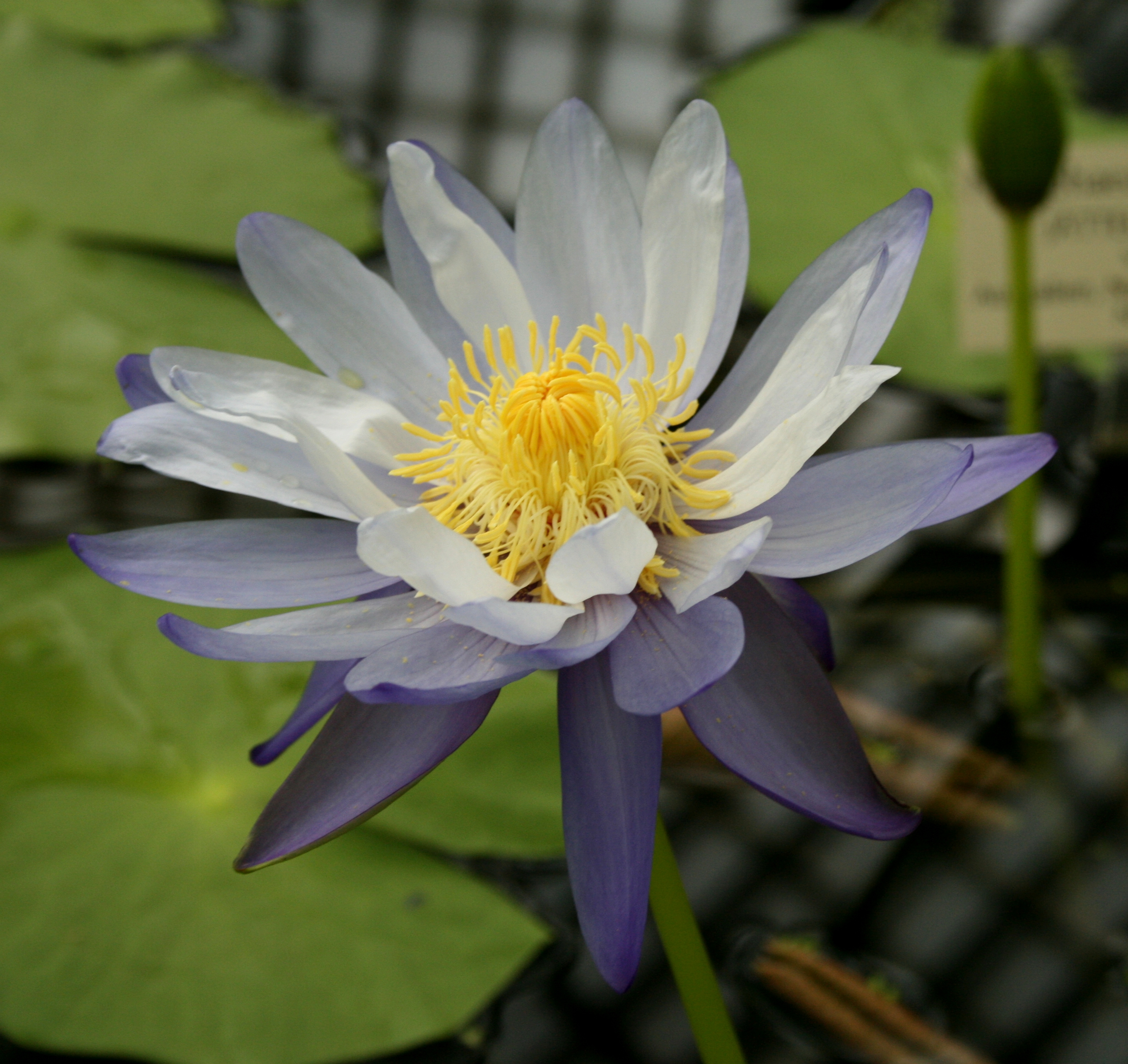
- Nymphaea violacea cultivated at Bergianska trädgården, Stockholm, Sweden

Conservation status
- Special Least Concern (NCA)

Scientific classification
- Kingdom: Plantae
- Clade: Tracheophytes
- Clade: Angiosperms
- Order: Nymphaeales
- Family: Nymphaeaceae
- Genus: Nymphaea
- Subgenus: Nymphaea subg. Anecphya
- Species: N. violacea

Binomial name
- Nymphaea violacea Lehm.

Synonyms
- Nymphaea gigantea var. violacea (Lehm.) Conard; Nymphaea brownii F.M.Bailey; Nymphaea casparyi Rehnelt & F.Henkel; Nymphaea holtzei Rehnelt & F.Henkel; Nymphaea holtzei var. albiflora F.Henkel; Nymphaea rehneltiana F.Henkel; Nymphaea violacea var. coerulea Lehm.

= Nymphaea violacea =

Species of water lily

Nymphaea violacea, also known as blue lily, is a species of flowering plant in the family Nymphaeaceae.

== Distribution ==
Nymphaea violacea is found in Australia, particularly in the Western Australian Kimberley region and in northern parts of Queensland and the Northern Territory.

== Description ==
The flowers are violet, blue or white.

== Cytology ==
The chromosome count is 2n = 112.

== Etymology ==
The specific epithet violacea is derived from the Latin violace, meaning violet coloured. It refers to the floral colouration.

== Uses ==
The waterlily is a bush tucker of the Aboriginal people in northern Australia. The tuber, stem, flowers and seeds are all edible.

Like other species in the genus, the plant contains the psychoactive alkaloid aporphine, which provide sedative effects when ingested.

== See also ==
- List of plants known as lily
