= Billabong =

Australian term for an oxbow lake or other waterhole

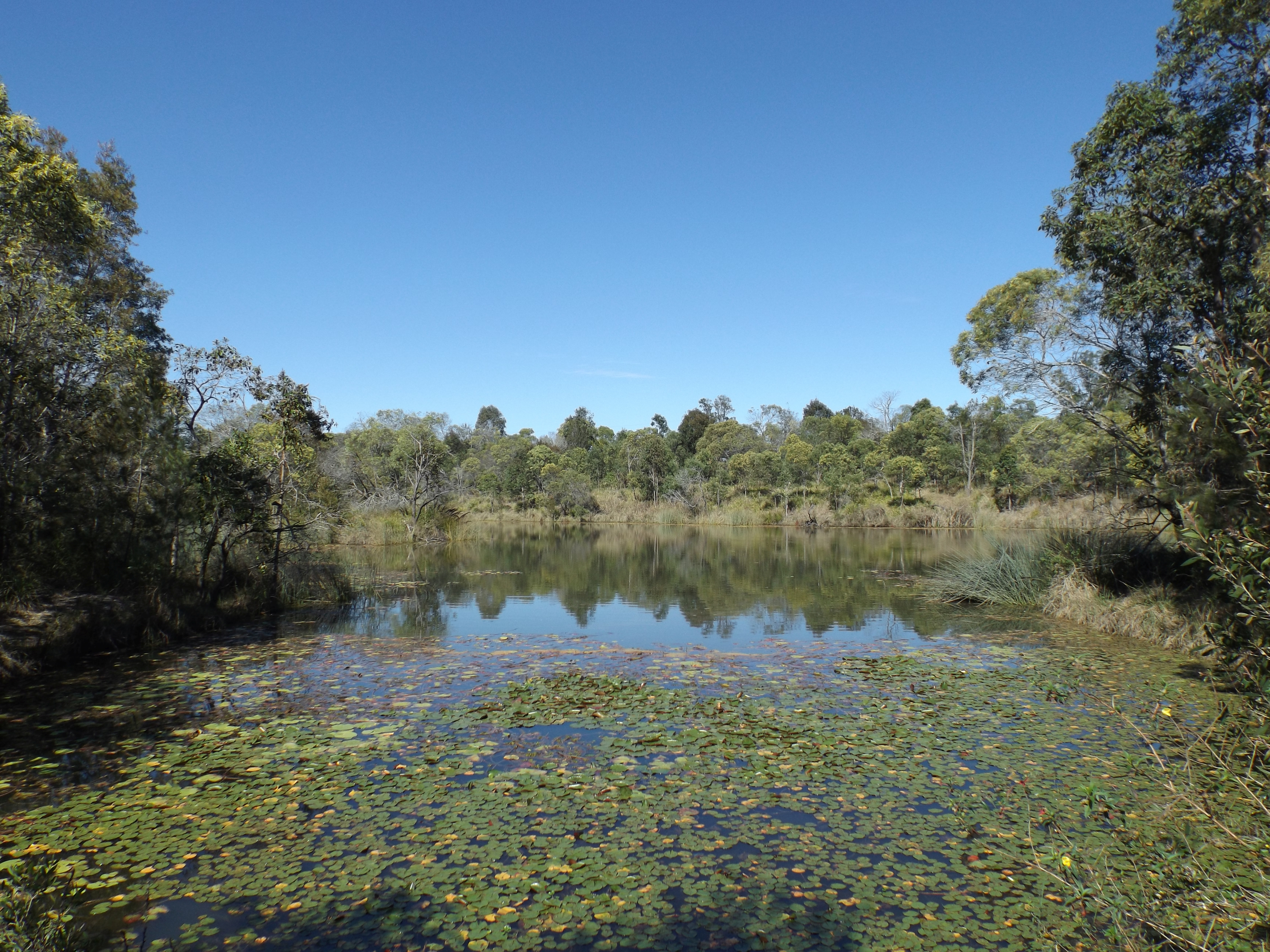
A billabong along Scrubby Creek at Berrinba Wetlands, Queensland, 2014

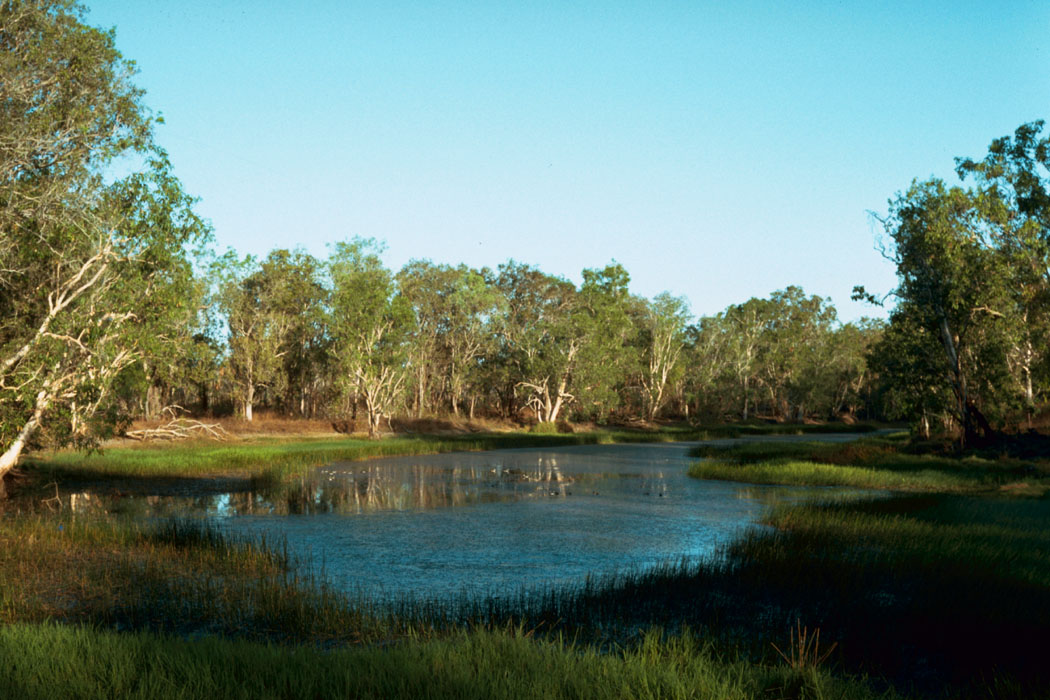
A billabong in the Northern Territory

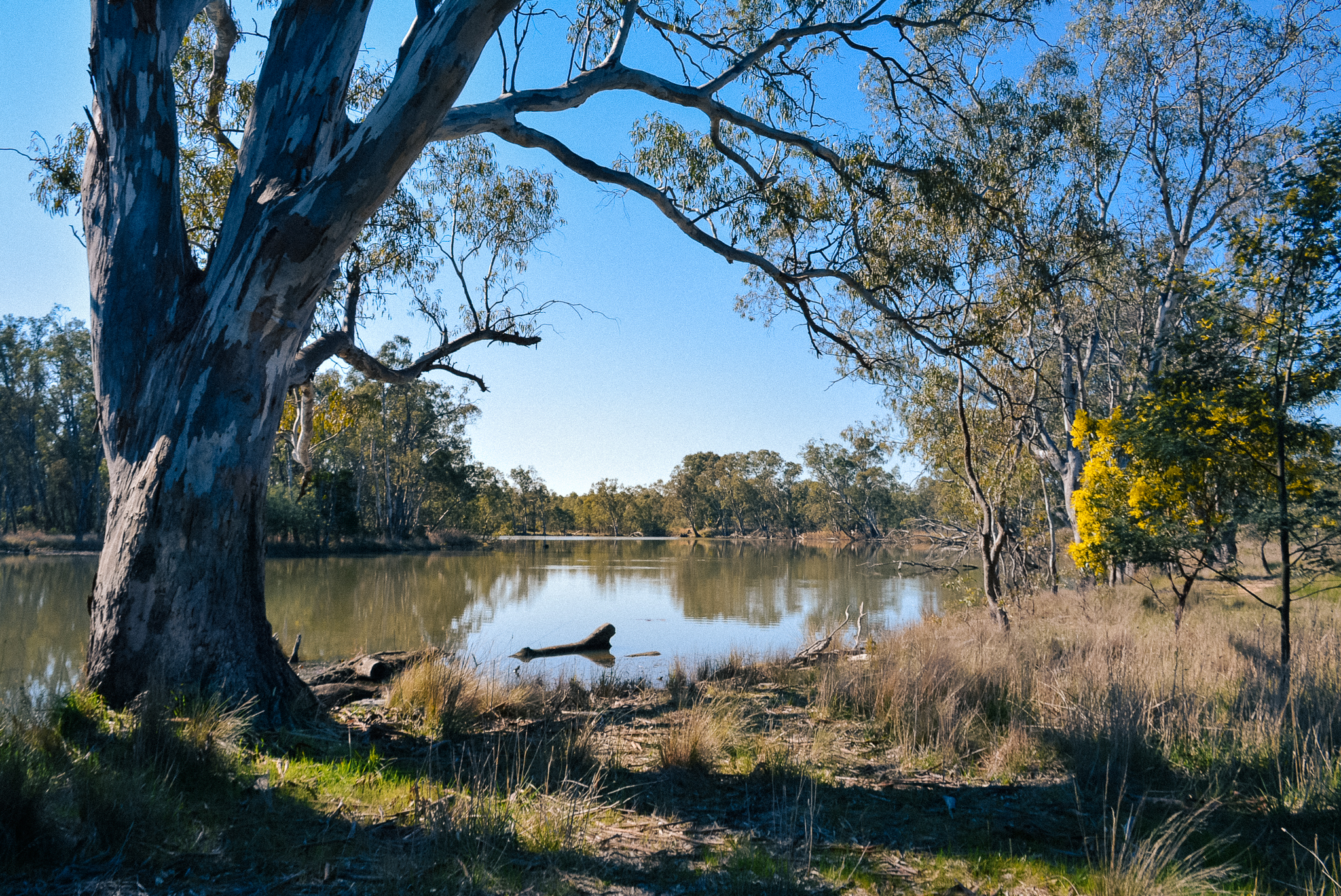
A billabong on the Goulburn River in Victoria

In Australian English, a billabong (/ˈbɪləbɒŋ/ BIL-ə-bong) is a small body of water, usually a permanent one created by a change in course or the flooding of a river. It is variously used to refer to oxbow lakes, dry creek beds that fill after heavy rainfall and channels of rivers that lead to dead-ends or backwaters. The term is likely borrowed from Wiradjuri, an Aboriginal Australian language of New South Wales.

== Etymology ==
The word billabong is most likely derived from the Wiradjuri language of southern New South Wales, which "describes a pond or pool of water that is left behind when a river alters course or after floodwaters recede". According to the Macquarie Dictionary (2005), the original term bilabaŋ means "a watercourse that runs only after rain", with bila meaning "river", and possibly combined with bong or bung, meaning "dead". The attribution of this last part of the word was contested in 2004 by Frederick Ludowyk of the Australian National Dictionary Centre, whose view was that "-bong" or "-bang" was a suffix "signifying a continuation in time or space". Ludowyk writes that bong meaning "dead" is not a Wiradjuri word, but may have been picked up or assumed from the word "bung", which was originally a Yagara word used in the pidgin widely spoken across Australia.

The word is first recorded in Australian English in 1836, referring to the Bell River in south-eastern New South Wales, when explorer Thomas Mitchell recorded the Aboriginal name of the river as "Billibang". It is first recorded in its later, more general sense, by J. Allen in 1853: "This station is situated about half-a-mile inland, over a 'billy-bong' (the native name for a small creek or backwater)". It is not recorded in the first edition of the Oxford English Dictionary (prepared 1882–1888), published before the later contributions of the Australian academic Edward Ellis Morris. It appears in Morris's Austral English: A Dictionary of Australasian Words (1898).

== Definitions and descriptions ==
Definitions vary. A billabong is often defined as an oxbow lake, an isolated crescentic pond left behind after a river loop is cut off when the river channel changes course.

Merriam-Webster defines the word as: "1. (a) a blind channel leading out from a river; (b) a usually dry streambed that is filled seasonally", or "2. a backwater forming a stagnant pool" The Cambridge Dictionary describes it as "In Australia, a low area of ground that was part of a river in the past and that only fills up with water from the river during a flood".

In a 2009 study, billabongs of the Channel Country (a region of outback Australia whose name derives from the numerous intertwined rivulets that cross it) are alternatively termed waterholes, and described as "enlarged channel segments along the main course of the river... typically occur[ring] at the confluence of two smaller channels".

Queensland's Department of Environment, Science and Innovation, in its Queensland Waterhole Classification Scheme, describes waterholes as "referred to by a range of different names (i.e. billabongs, lagoons and waterbodies)".

Billabongs are usually formed when the path of a creek or river changes due to bank erosion, leaving the former channel deprived of further inflow and becoming a dead-end gully holding only residual water that has not yet drained or evaporated. As a result of the arid climate of many parts of Australia, these "dead rivers" often fill with water seasonally but can be dry for a greater part of the year.

== Significance ==
=== To people ===
Many billabongs are of cultural significance and social importance to Aboriginal and Torres Strait Islander peoples, and are used as sources of fresh water and other resources. Water is understood as an intrinsic part of Country; given its status as an essential resource during drought or dry seasons, many Indigenous cultures feature intricate traditions and inherited methodologies around practices for locating water.

The Ngan'gi peoples in the Daly River region of the Northern Territory continue to manage the billabongs' ecology in their Country.

Water-holding frogs living in the billabongs can take up a lot of water before it burrows into the earth in the dry season, and Aboriginal peoples in desert environments can locate the frogs underground by various means.

In the days since the colonisation of Australia, these were important landmarks for European settlers to identify, and many billabongs were given names relating to the local areas.

A billabong retains water longer than the original watercourse and may be the only accessible water in a large area.

=== Ecological significance ===
Billabongs are significant because they do not have outflow and can hold water longer than sections of rivers especially during drier season, thus serving important ecological functions as waterholes and habitats for freshwater animal and plant species, including the water-holding frog. Many of these species' life cycles are related to the changes in seasons.

Dangers to the ecological balance of billabongs include saltwater intrusion and introduced species. Feral animals have caused salt water to flow into Arafura Swamp, a large freshwater basin in the Top End in the Northern Territory, in which there are many permanent billabongs.

== Examples ==
- Arafura Swamp – many billabongs
- Along Cooper Creek in Queensland, and other parts of the Channel Country
- Corroboree Billabong, in Kakadu National Park
- Kings Billabong, on the Murray River in Victoria
- White Lily Billabong, in Kakadu National Park
- Yellow Water Billabong, in Kakadu National Park

== In the arts ==
Once a jolly swagman camped by a billabong,
Under the shade of a coolibah tree,
And he sang as he watched and waited till his billy boiled,
Who'll come a'waltzing Matilda with me

— Banjo Paterson, Waltzing Matilda

Banjo Paterson's popular song "Waltzing Matilda" is set beside a billabong.

Mary Grant Bruce wrote a series of books, known as The Billabong Series, depicting the adventures of the Linton family, who live at Billabong station from around 1911 until the late 1920s.

Both Aboriginal Australians and European artists use billabongs as subject matter in painting. For example, Aboriginal painter Tjyllyungoo (Lance Chad) has a watercolour entitled Trees at a billabong.

American avant-garde filmmaker Will Hindle produced a short film titled Billabong in 1969.

They are mentioned in the title of the song "Billabong Valley" by Australian prog-rock band King Gizzard and the Lizard Wizard.

== In commerce ==
Billabong is the name of an Australian brand of sportswear for surf, skateboard, and snowboard.

== See also ==
- Guelta
- Limnology
- Meander
- Watering hole
