= Mighty Og =

Coordinates: 47°44′43″N 99°55′27″W

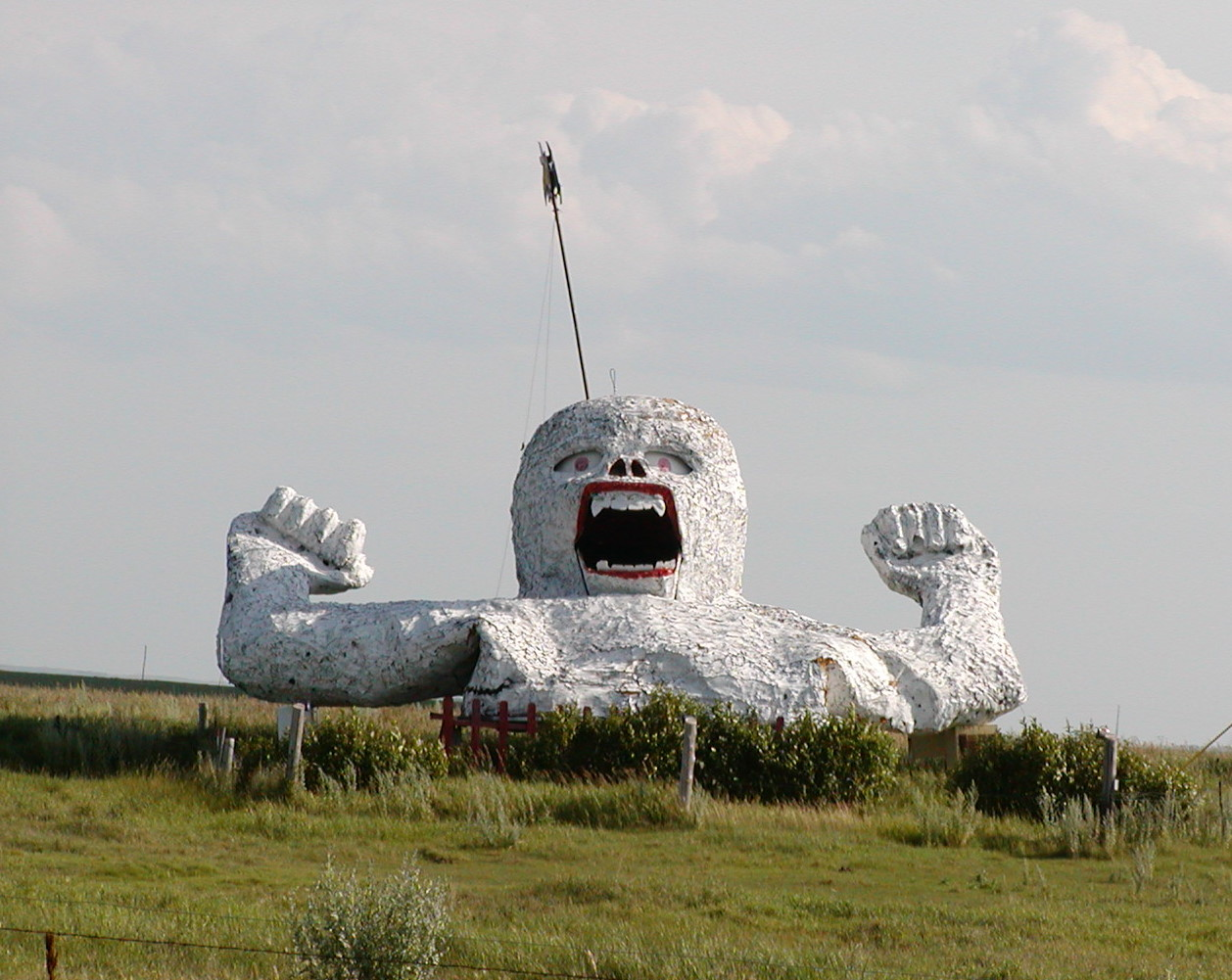
Mighty Og on Highway 52 near Harvey, ND

Mighty Og was a roadside attraction consisting of a 36-foot (11 m) high sculpture of a gorilla from the waist up. It originally graced a billboard promoting Rawhide City, a tourist attraction in Mandan, North Dakota.

The statue was auctioned following the Rawhide City bankruptcy. It was purchased by James Lelm who engaged a house mover to transport it the 120 miles (190 km) to Harvey, North Dakota. He had intended it as an attraction to his hardware store, but opted not to proceed due to structural concerns. A site was eventually located on Highway 52. The figure shakes its fist at a large hornet above its head to indicate that "even a gorilla can't beat the Hornets", a reference to the local school team.

The structure was destroyed in a strong windstorm sometime before June 2005.

North Dakota has a number of these giant statues including a 40-foot (12 m) sandhill crane (the World's Largest Sandhill Crane in Steele), a 38-foot (12 m) high Holstein cow (Salem Sue in New Salem), a 40-foot (12 m) grasshopper (part of the Enchanted Highway near Regent), and a 60-short-ton (54 t) buffalo (the World's Largest Buffalo in Jamestown). One hypothesis put forth is that these figures distinguish one community from another in an otherwise somewhat featureless landscape.
