= Susiea =

Susiea Temporal range: 59.2–56 Ma Late Paleocene

Scientific classification
- Kingdom: Plantae
- Clade: Tracheophytes
- Clade: Angiosperms
- Order: Nymphaeales
- Family: Nymphaeaceae
- Genus: †Susiea; Taylor, DeVore & Pigg
- Species: †S. newsalemae

Binomial name
- †Susiea newsalemae Taylor, DeVore & Pigg

Species of aquatic plant

Susiea newsalemae was a species of plant, which occurred in the Late Paleocene period of North Dakota, USA. It is monospecific within the genus Susiea.

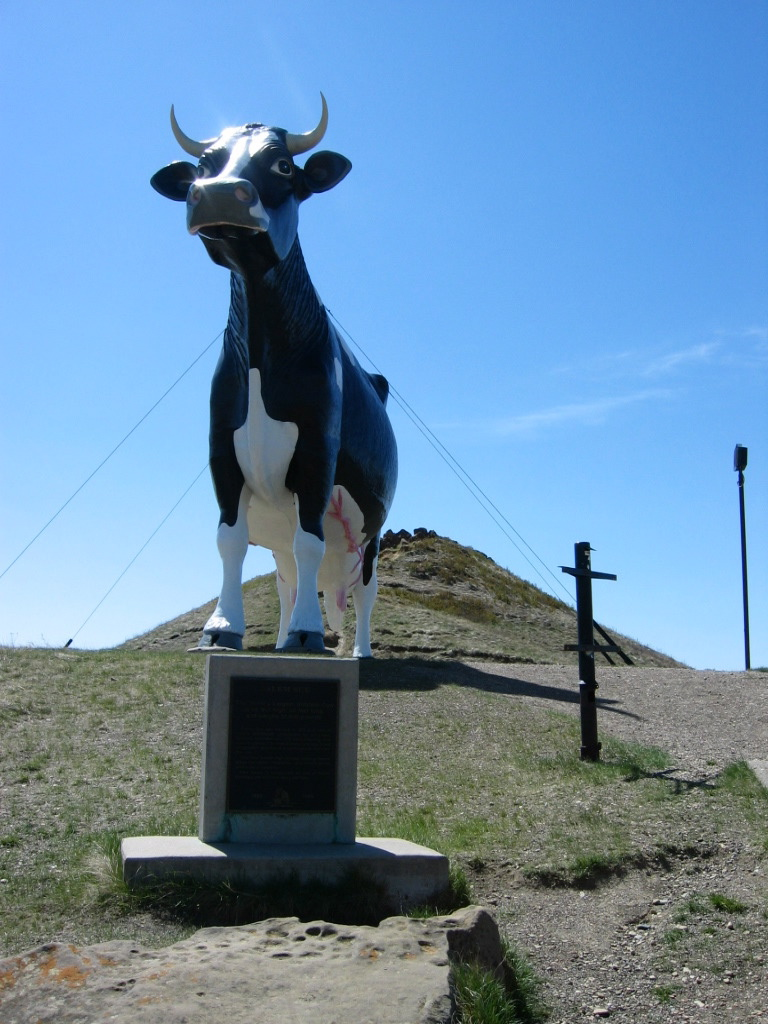
The statue Salem Sue, after which this genus was named

== Description ==
=== Generative characteristics ===
The bilaterally symmetrical, operculate, oval to barrel-shaped seeds are 5 mm long, and 3 mm wide. The seeds have a prominent lateral raphe.

== Taxonomy ==
=== Publication ===
It was published by Witt Taylor, Melanie L. DeVore and Kathleen B. Pigg in 2006.

=== Type specimen ===
The type specimen was collected in Morton County, North Dakota, USA.

=== Position within Nymphaeales ===
It is placed in the family Nymphaeaceae.

== Etymology ==
The generic name Susiea references the statue Salem Sue. The specific epithet newsalemae refers to New Salem, North Dakota, USA.
