= Harvey Public School District =

Harvey Public School District can refer to:

- Harvey School District 152 near Chicago
- Harvey Public School District 38 or Harvey Public Schools in North Dakota
