= Wahpper =

Sculpture in North Dakota, US

Coordinates: 46°17′20″N 96°35′49″W

- Artist: Dave Oswald
- Year: 1997
- Subject: channel catfish
- Dimensions: 40 feet (12 m) long x 12 feet (3.7 m) high
- Weight: 50,000 pounds (23,000 kg)

"Wahpper" is a 40-foot long fiberglass sculpture of a catfish beside the Red River of the North in Wahpeton, North Dakota, United States.

== Description and history ==
Wahpper can be found at the north end of Wahpeton, on the banks of the Red River within the Kidder Dam Recreation Area. The sculpture is 40 feet long, 12 feet tall (including its pedestal) and weighs more than 5,000 pounds.

Wahpeton's Visitor's Committee (now the Convention and Visitors Bureau) viewed a giant sculpture as a good way to market the town and its natural resources. The Red River is formed by the Bois de Sioux and Otter Tail Rivers, and the headwaters is in Wahpeton; people come from multiple states to fish the river's abundant channel catfish. $12,000 was raised to create the sculpture, which was raised by multiple organizations, including the Wahpeton Visitors Committee, the Wahpeton Park Board, and local businesses. It was placed at the site on August 3, 1997, with an opening celebration that included serving catfish to guests.

The artist was Dave Oswold, the same sculptor that created other fiberglass creations such as Salem Sue in New Salem, North Dakota and the 143-foot long sculpture of a muskie at the National Fresh Water Fishing Hall of Fame in Hayward, Wisconsin. The Wahpeton sculpture is credited as the world's largest sculpture of a catfish, however, there is a larger catfish statue in Dunnville, Ontario standing at 50 feet long and 27 feet high. The fish's name, "Wahpper," is a playful nod towards a very big fish, or a "whopper," combined with the town's name. During the river's spring flooding, the sculpture is surrounded by water, giving the impression the fish is swimming.

== See also ==
- Yangzhong Puffer Fish
