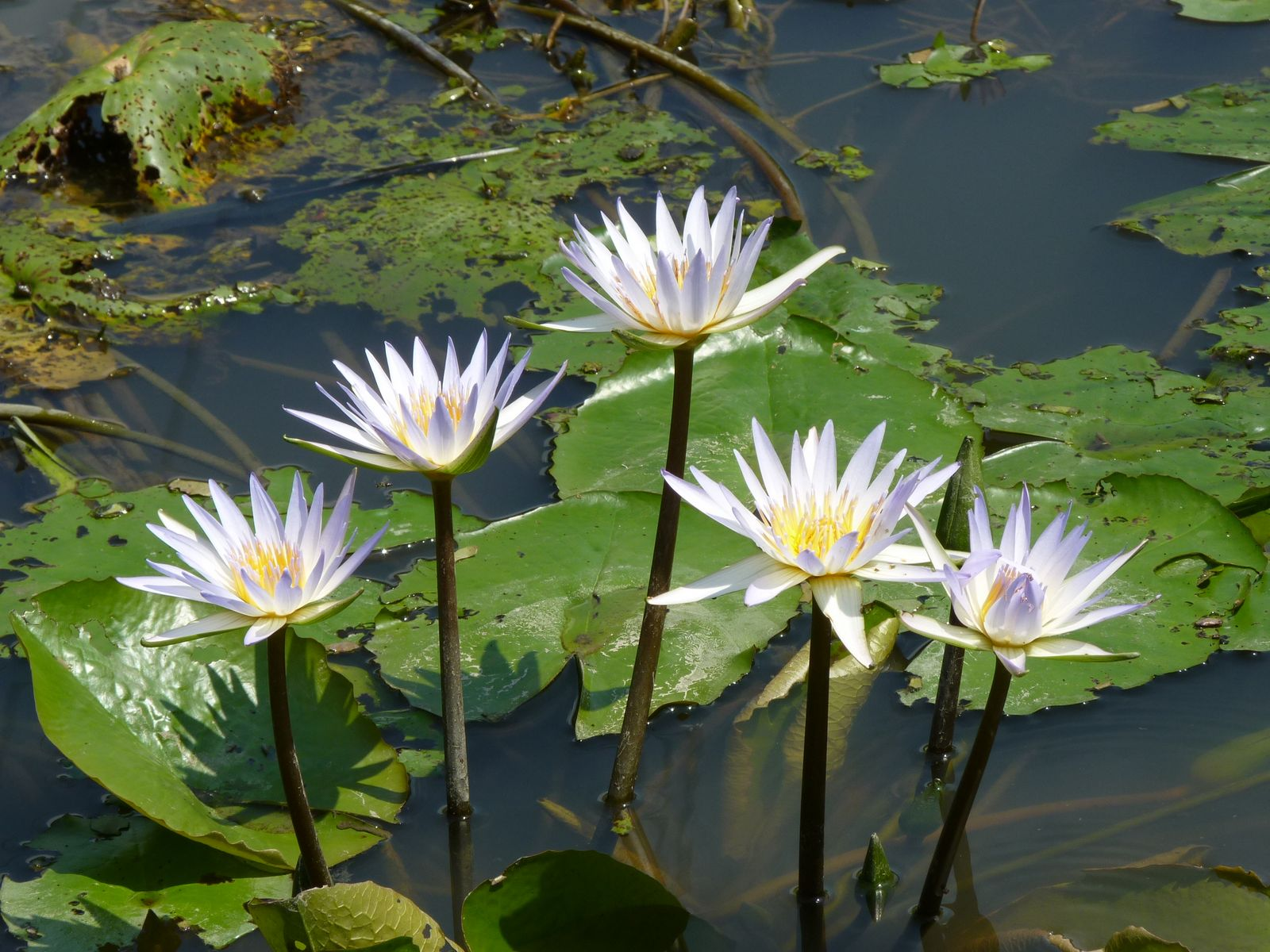
- Nymphaea nouchali

Scientific classification
- Kingdom: Plantae
- Clade: Tracheophytes
- Clade: Angiosperms
- Order: Nymphaeales
- Family: Nymphaeaceae; Salisb.

Genera
- Extant genera: Barclaya; Euryale; Nuphar; Nymphaea; Victoria; Fossil genera: †Allenbya; †Barclayopsis; †Jaguariba; †Notonuphar; †Nuphaea; †Microvictoria; †Monetianthus; †Ploufolia?; †Susiea

Synonyms
- Barclayaceae; Euryalaceae; Nupharaceae; Nympheaceae

= Nymphaeaceae =

Nymphaeaceae Temporal range: 130–0 Ma Early Cretaceous – Recent

Family of plants

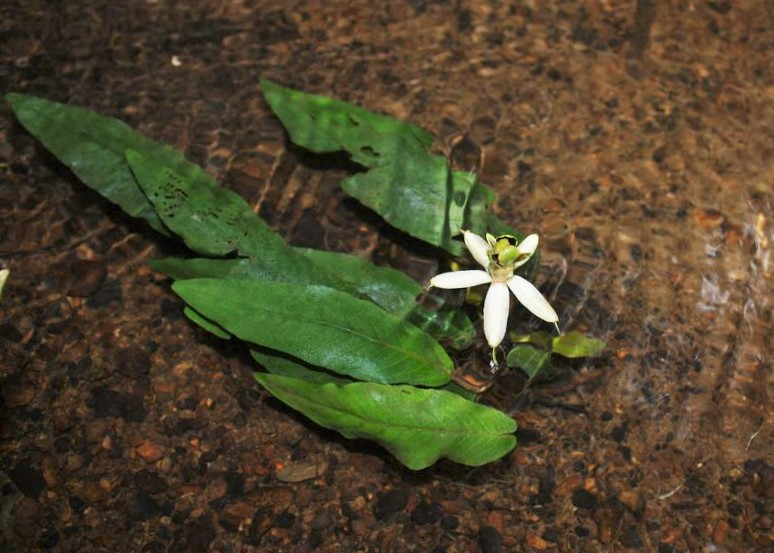
Flowering Barclaya longifolia specimen, Thailand

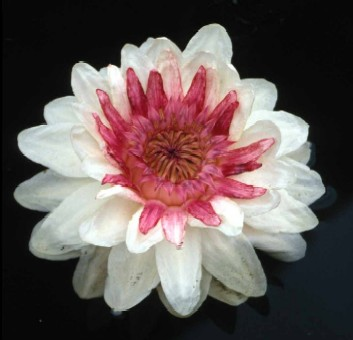
Flower of Victoria cruziana, Santa Cruz water lily

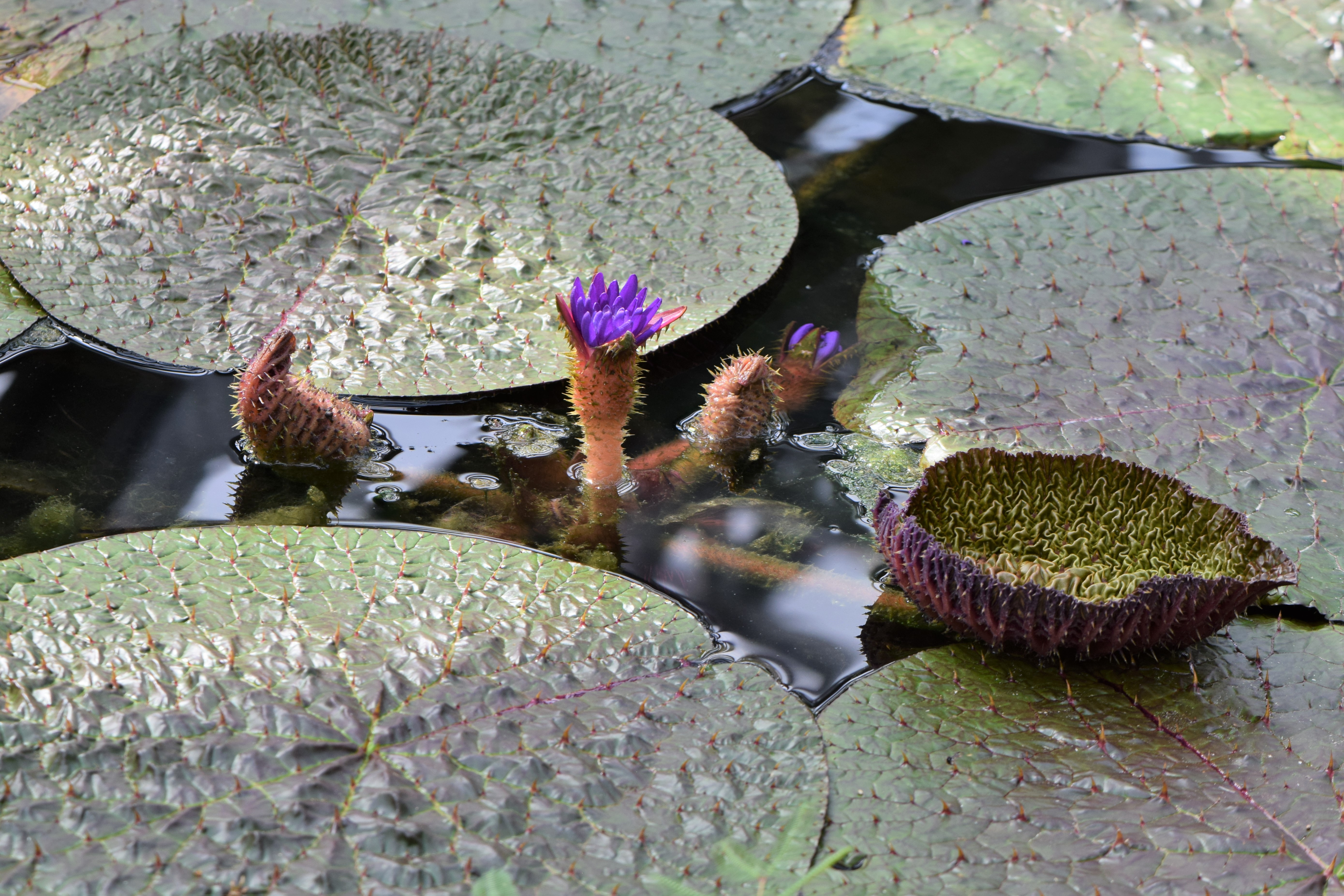
Flowering Euryale ferox specimen cultivated in the Botanischer Garten Berlin-Dahlem, Germany

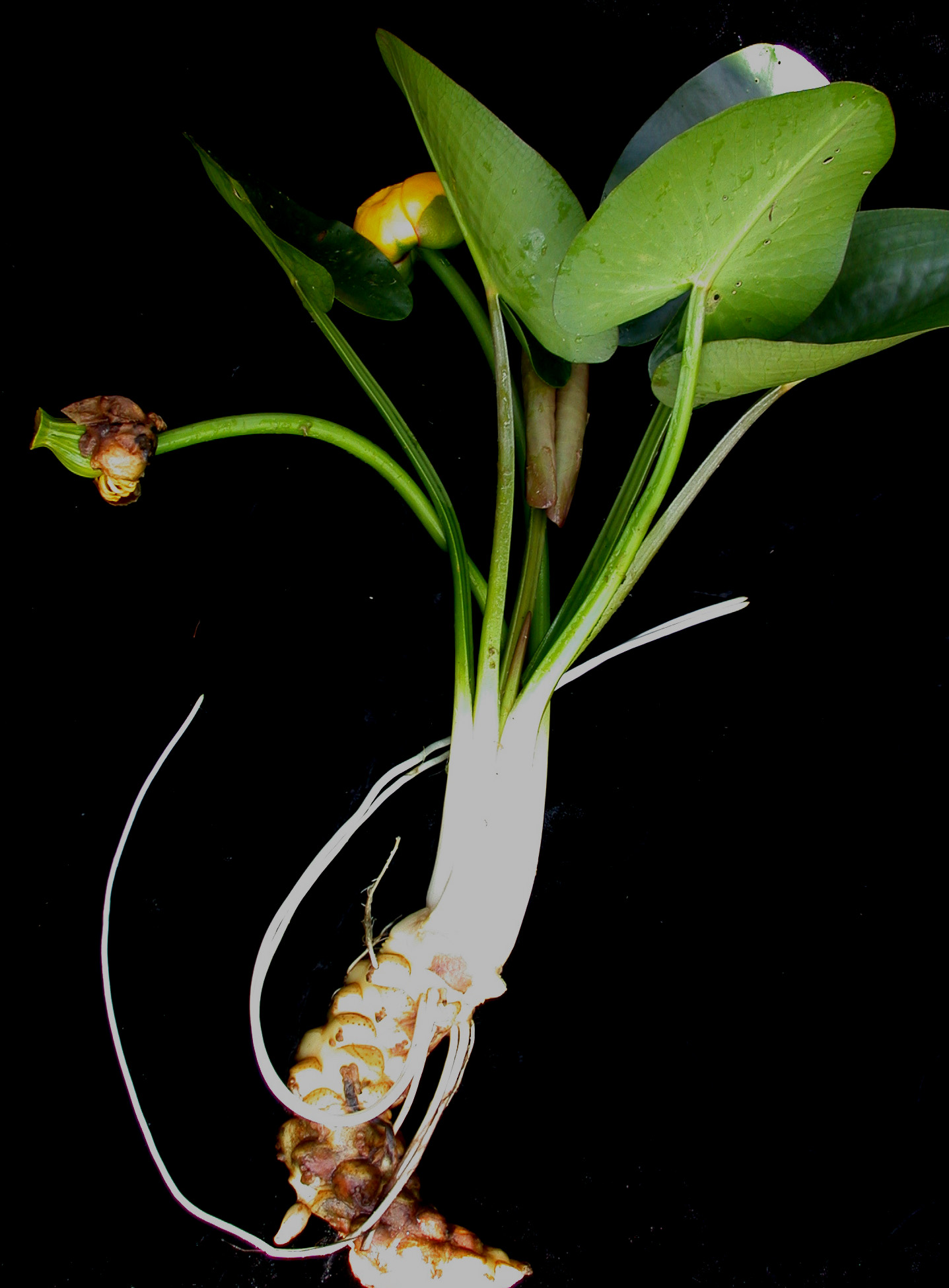
Flowering and fruiting Nuphar variegata specimen

Nymphaeaceae (/ˌnɪmfiˈeɪsi.iː, -ˌaɪ/) is a family of flowering plants, commonly called water lilies. They live as rhizomatous aquatic herbs in temperate and tropical climates around the world. The family contains five genera with about 70 known species. Water lilies are rooted in soil in bodies of water, with leaves and flowers floating on or rising from the surface. Leaves are oval and heart-shaped in Barclaya. Leaves are round, with a radial notch in Nymphaea and Nuphar, but fully circular in Victoria and Euryale.

Water lilies are a well-studied family of plants because their large flowers with multiple unspecialized parts were initially considered to represent the floral pattern of the earliest flowering plants. Later genetic studies confirmed their evolutionary position as basal angiosperms. Analyses of floral morphology and molecular characteristics and comparisons with a sister taxon, the family Cabombaceae, indicate, however, that the flowers of extant water lilies with the most floral parts are more derived than the genera with fewer floral parts. Genera with more floral parts, Nuphar, Nymphaea, Victoria, have a beetle pollination syndrome, while genera with fewer parts are pollinated by flies or bees, or are self- or wind-pollinated. Thus, the large number of relatively unspecialized floral organs in the Nymphaeaceae is not an ancestral condition for the clade.

== Description ==
=== Vegetative characteristics ===
The Nymphaeaceae are annual or perennial, aquatic, rhizomatous herbs. The family is further characterized by scattered vascular bundles in the stems, and frequent presence of latex, usually with distinct, stellate-branched sclereids projecting into the air canals. Hairs are simple, usually producing mucilage (slime).

Leaves are alternate and spiral, opposite or occasionally whorled, simple, peltate or nearly so, entire to toothed or dissected, short to long petiolate, with blade submerged, floating or emergent, with palmate to pinnate venation. Stipules are either present or absent.

=== Generative characteristics ===
Flowers are solitary, bisexual, radial, with a long pedicel and usually floating or raised above the surface of the water, with girdling vascular bundles in receptacle. Some species are protogynous and primarily cross-pollinated, but because male and female stages overlap during the second day of flowering, and because it is self-compatible, self-fertilization is possible. Female and male parts of the flower are usually active at different times, to facilitate cross-pollination, although this is just one of several reproductive strategies used by these plants.

There are 4–12 sepals, which are distinct to connate, imbricate, and often petallike. Petals lacking or 8 to numerous, inconspicuous to showy, often intergrading with stamens. Stamens are 3 to numerous, the innermost sometimes represented by staminodes. Filaments are distinct, free or adnate to petaloid staminodes, slender and well differentiated from anthers to laminar and poorly differentiated from anthers; pollen grains usually monosulcate or lacking apertures. Carpels are 3 to numerous, distinct or connate.

The fruit is an aggregate of nuts, a berry, or an irregularly dehiscent fleshy spongy capsule. Seeds are often arillate, more or less lacking endosperm.

== Taxonomy ==
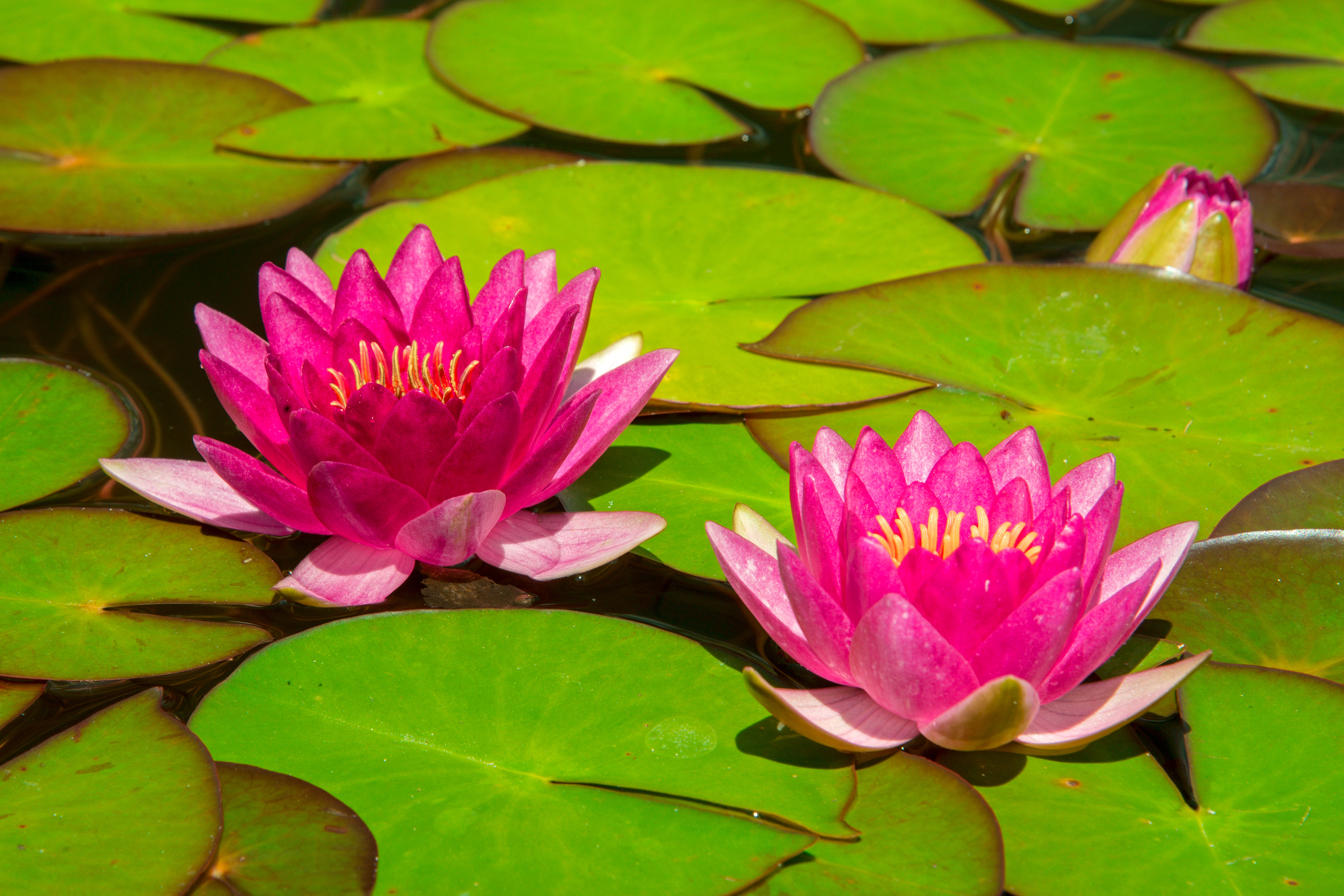
Water lilies in Ontario, Canada

Nymphaeaceae has been investigated systematically for decades because botanists considered their floral morphology to represent one of the earliest groups of angiosperms. Modern genetic analyses by the Angiosperm Phylogeny Group researchers has confirmed its basal position among flowering plants. In addition, the Nymphaeaceae are more genetically diverse and geographically dispersed than other basal angiosperms. Nymphaeaceae is placed in the order Nymphaeales, which is the second diverging group of angiosperms after Amborella in the most widely accepted flowering plant classification system, APG IV system.

- Nymphaeaceae
  - - - - - Victoria
          - Euryale
        - Nymphaea
      - Ondinea
    - Barclaya
  - Nuphar

Nymphaeaceae is a small family of three to six genera: Barclaya, Euryale, Nuphar, Nymphaea, Ondinea, and Victoria. The genus Barclaya is sometimes given rank as its own family, Barclayaceae, on the basis of an extended perianth tube (combined sepals and petals) arising from the top of the ovary and by stamens that are joined in the base. However, molecular phylogenetic work includes it in Nymphaeaceae. The genus Ondinea has recently been shown to be a morphologically aberrant species of Nymphaea, and is now included in this genus. The genera Euryale, of far east Asia, and Victoria, from South America, are closely related despite their geographic distance, but their relationship toward Nymphaea need further studies.

The sacred lotus was once thought to be a water lily, but is now recognized to be a highly modified eudicot in its own family Nelumbonaceae of the order Proteales.

=== Fossils ===
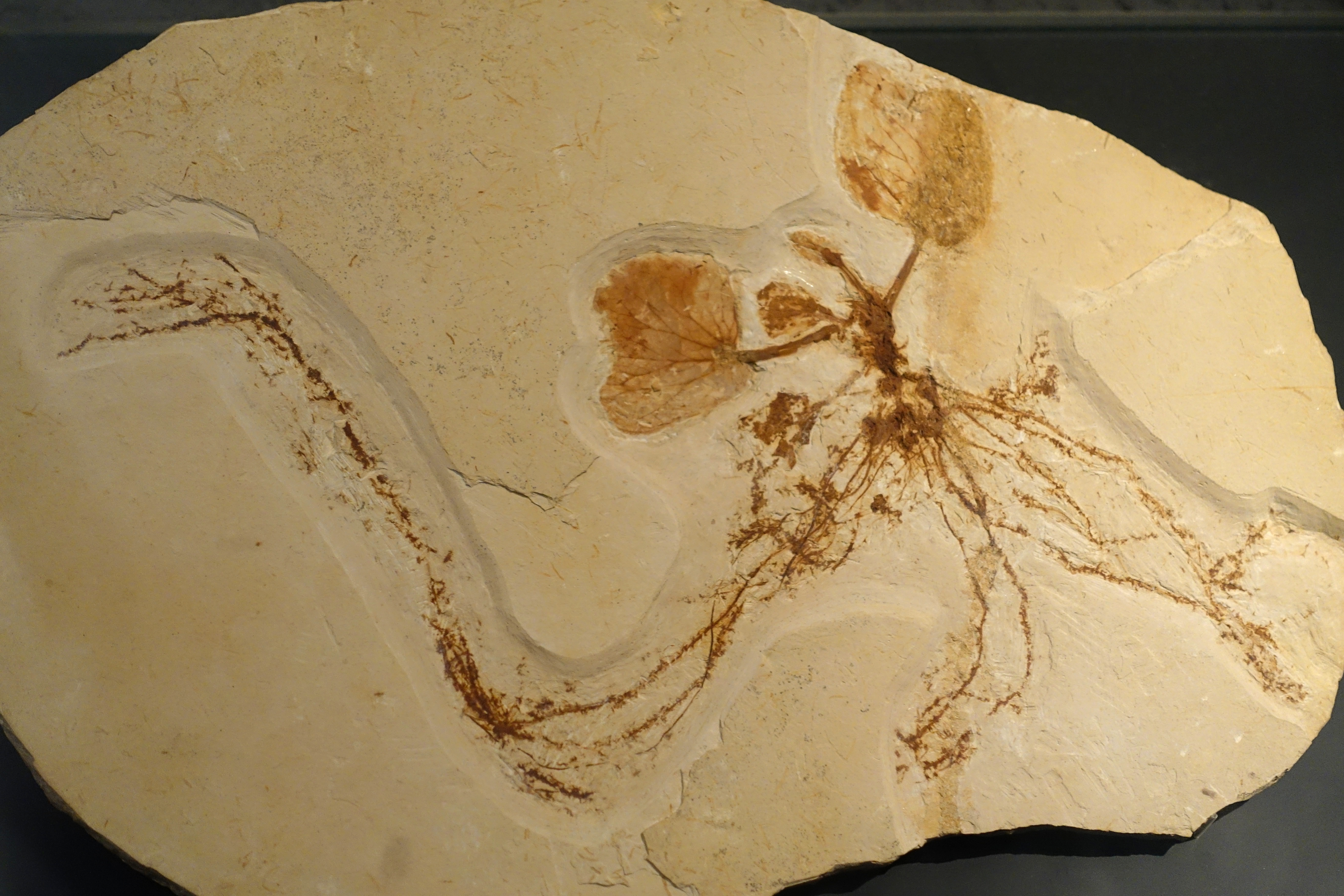
Fossil of Jaguariba wiersemana

Several fossil species are known, including Cretaceous representatives of Nymphaea, as well as fossil genera such as Jaguariba from the Cretaceous of Brazil, Allenbya from the Ypresian of British Columbia, Notonuphar from the Eocene of Antarctica, Nuphaea from the Eocene of Germany, Susiea from the Late Paleocene Almont Flora of North Dakota, USA, and Barclayopsis from the Maastrichtian of Eisleben, Germany.

== Invasiveness ==
The beautiful nature of water lilies has led to their widespread use as ornamental plants. The Mexican waterlily, native to the Gulf Coast of North America, is planted throughout the continent. It has escaped from cultivation and become invasive in some areas, such as California's San Joaquin Valley. It can infest slow-moving bodies of water and is difficult to eradicate. Populations can be controlled by cutting top growth. Herbicides can also be used to control populations using glyphosate and fluridone.

== Culture ==
The water lily is the national flower of Bangladesh, Iran, and Sri Lanka. The Emblem of Bangladesh contains a lily floating on water. It is also the birth flower for the month of July.

The Nymphaeaceae, which is also called Nilufar Abi in Persian, can be seen in many reliefs of the Achaemenid period (552 BC) such as the statue of Anahita in the Persepolis. Lotus flower was included in Kaveh the blacksmith's Derafsh and later as the flag of the Sasanian Empire Derafsh Kaviani. Today, it is known as the symbol of Iranians Solar Hijri Calendar.

Lily pads, also known as Seeblätter, are a charge in Northern European heraldry, often coloured red (gules), and appear on the flag of Friesland and the coat of arms of Denmark (in the latter case often replaced by red hearts).

The water lily has a special place in Sangam literature and Tamil poetics, where it is considered symbolic of the grief of separation; it is considered to evoke imagery of the sunset, the seashore, and the shark.

=== Heraldry ===
National Emblem of Bangladesh (1972–present)

The emblem of surgeon and obstetrician to Napoleon, Baron Antoine Dubois (1756–1837).

Personal coat of arms of Cyril Newall, 1st Baron Newall (1946)

Coat of arms of Montederramo, Ourense.

=== In visual arts ===
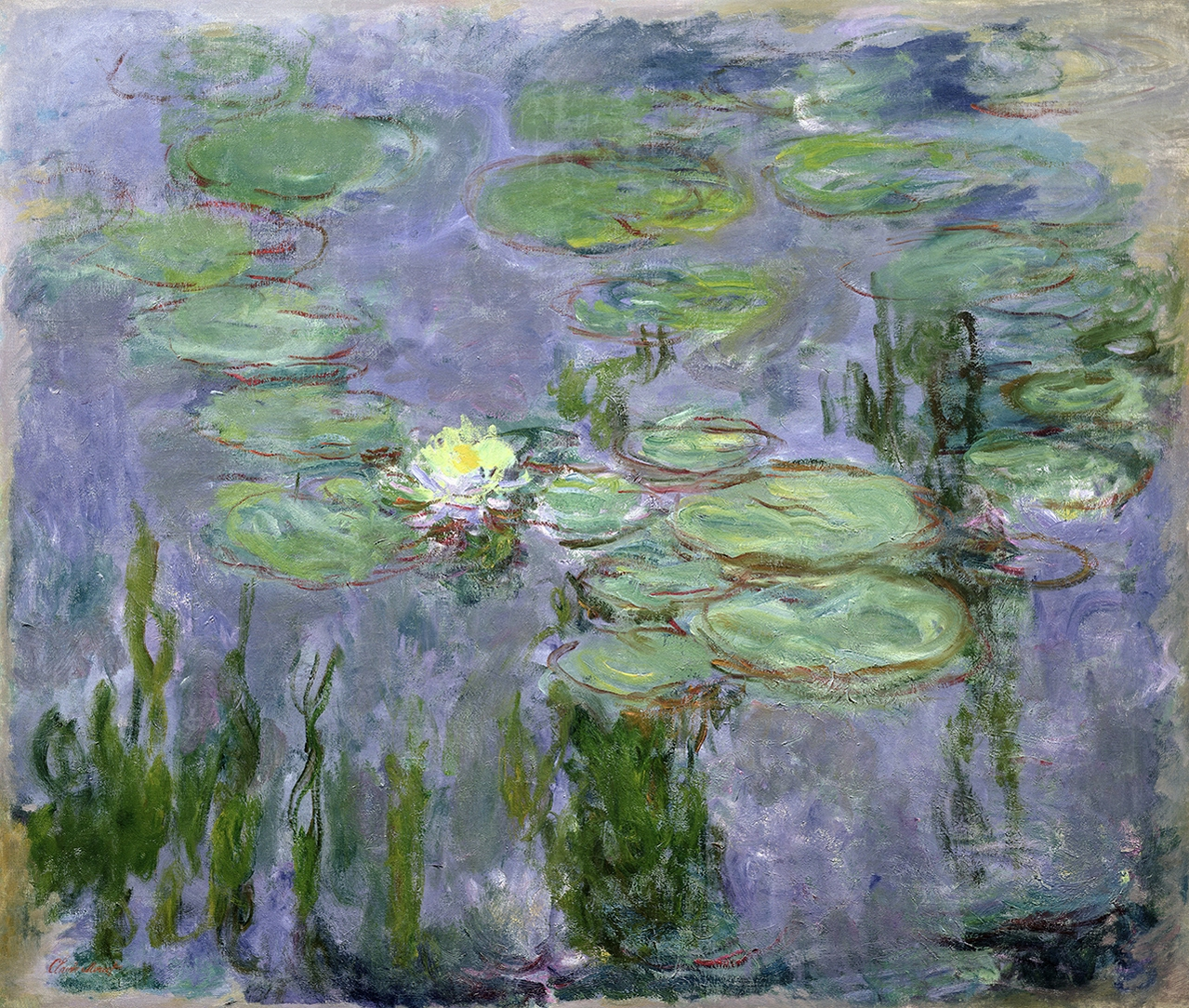
Nymphéas, Monnet, 1915, Musée Marmottan Monet.

Water lilies were depicted by the French artist Claude Monet (1840–1926) in a series of paintings.

=== Maya ===
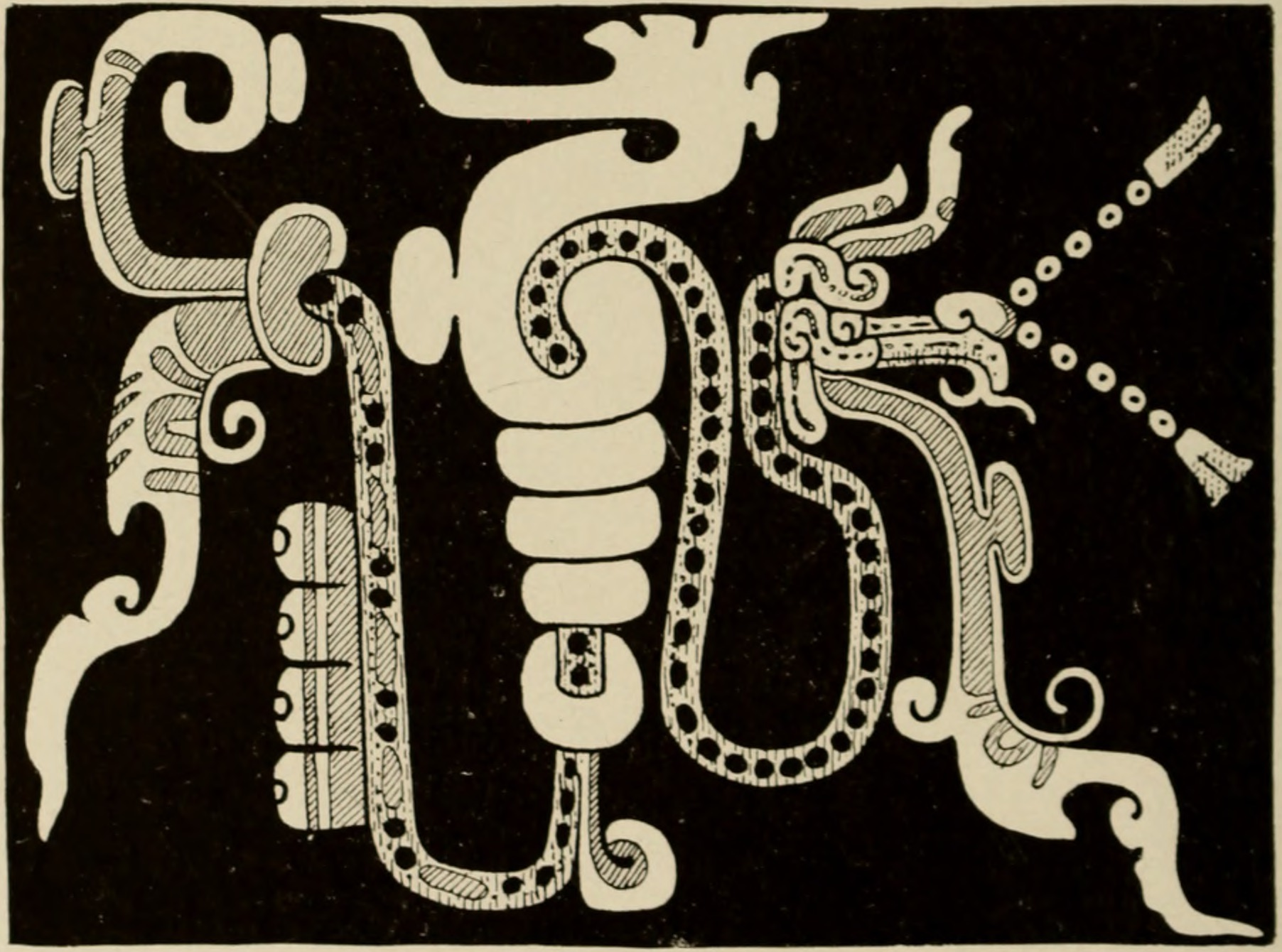
Maya iconography with water lilies

The main job of the Maya rulers during pre-Columbian Mesoamerica was to obtain clean and drinkable water for their citizens during both the wet and dry seasons. Their success in accomplishing this is what allowed them to grow their polity by attracting dry-season laborers. They did this by constructing water systems such as reservoirs, wetland reclamation, and dams and channels to capture and store rainwater. With their knowledge of the wetland biosphere, they transformed artificial reservoirs into wetland biospheres. One way that they tested whether the water systems were working properly was if the Nymphaeaceae were thriving. Water lilies became a visual sign of water cleanliness, so the Maya elite began to associate themselves with the flowers.

The Maya began to use water lily iconography depicted on stelae, monumental architecture, murals, and in hieroglyphic writing. Even in Maya settlements like Palenque, where the main water supplies were springs and flowing streams (places where water lilies cannot grow), the flowers were prevalent in their iconographic records. Aristocrats and religious figures wore masks and/or headdresses during celebratory events that had water lilies and/or water lily symbols to appear like gods. There is also evidence that water lilies were used as cultural entheogenic. Some interpretations of ritual scenes drawn out by the Maya have been blood being extracted from perforated body parts. However, more close examinations show that this is instead a liquid flowing directly from water lily flowers that were on the heads of certain gods. It is likely that the Maya ingested these plants to create a non-ordinary state of consciousness, which makes sense because there is a class of opiate alkaloids in Nymphaeaceae. Overall, these examples show just how important this specific form of water symbolism was throughout the Maya region.

== Gallery ==
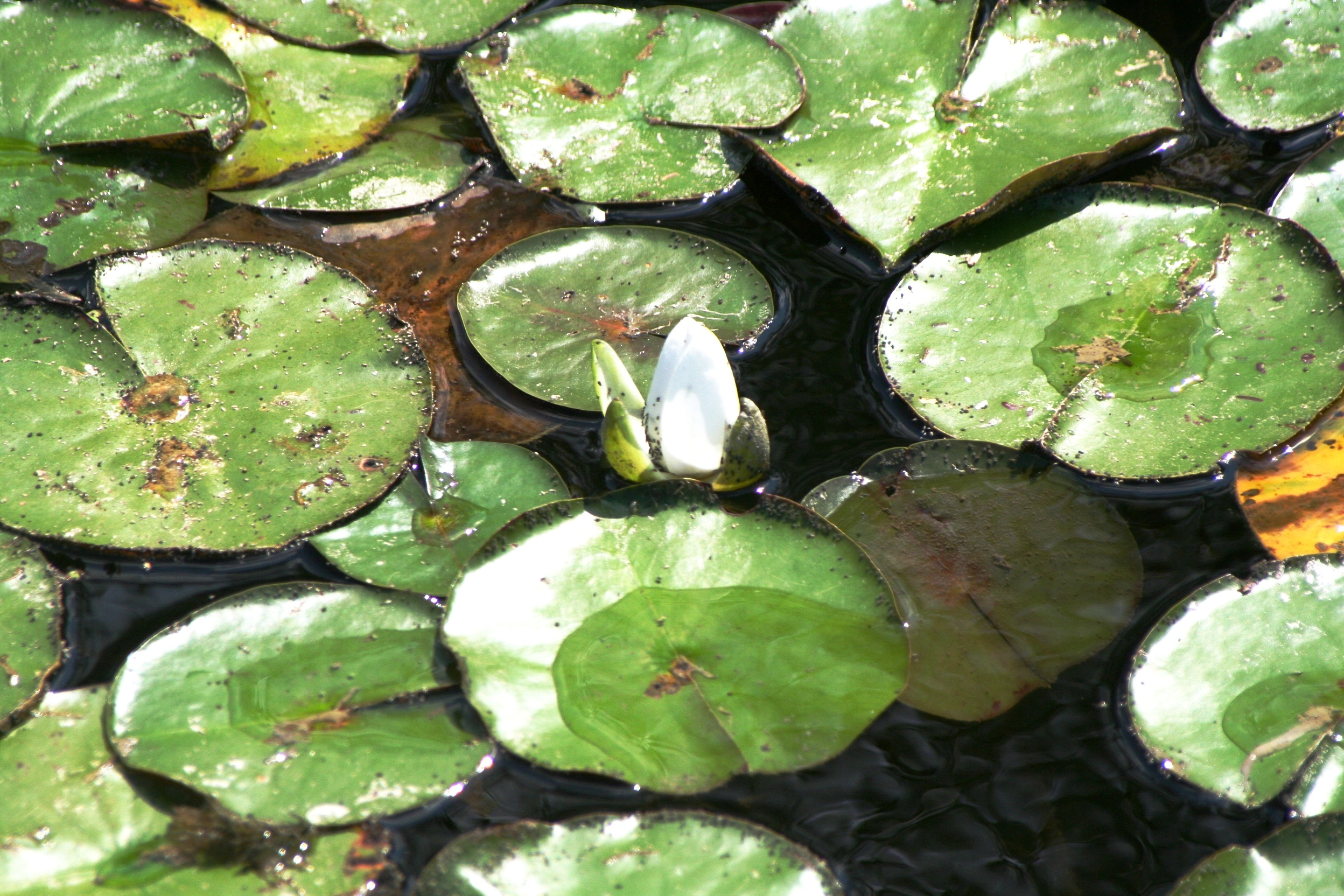
Lily pads floating in a lake in Toronto, Canada

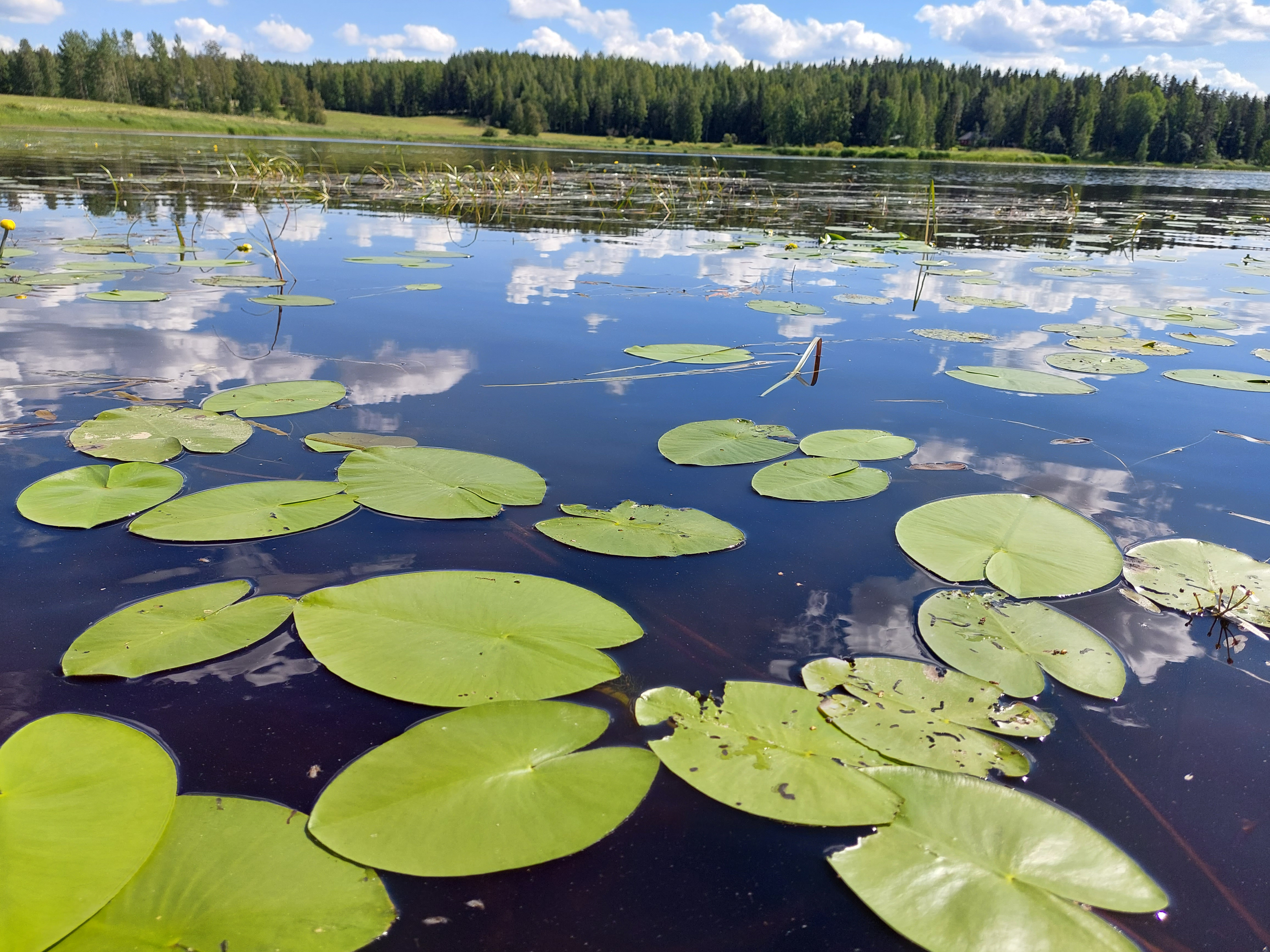
Lily pads floating on Matkusjoki River in Iisalmi, Finland

Water lily at Sambalpur

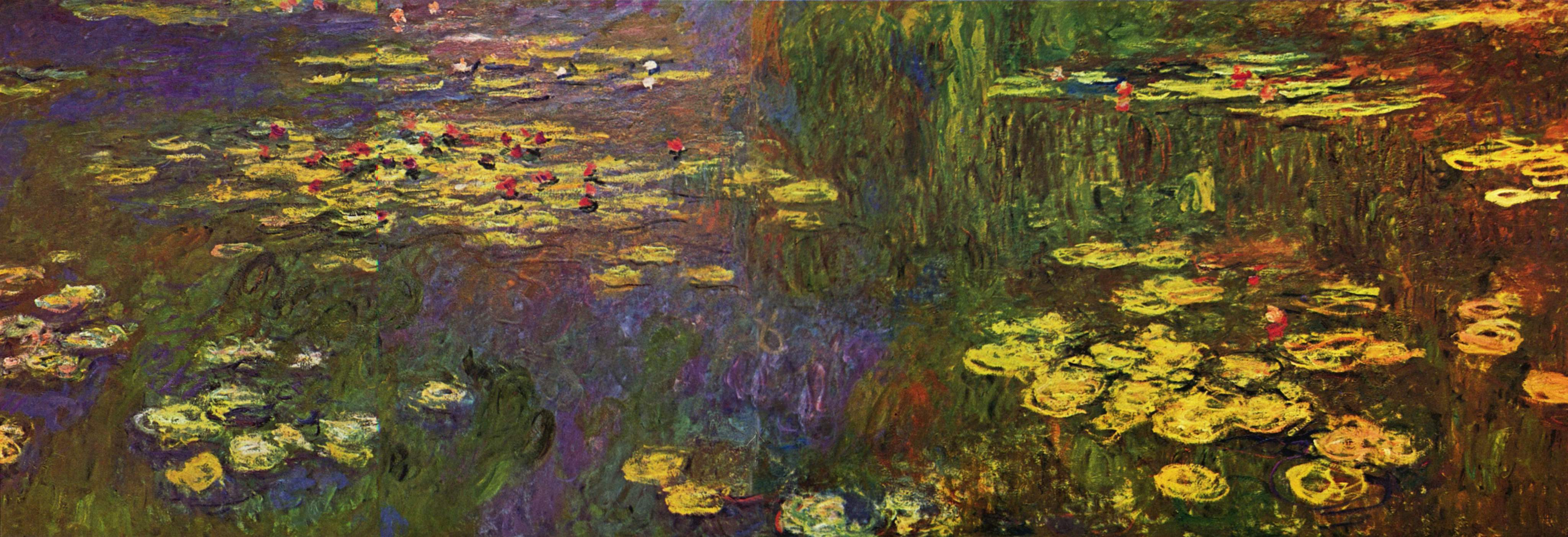
Water Lilies, 1920-1926, Musée de l'Orangerie

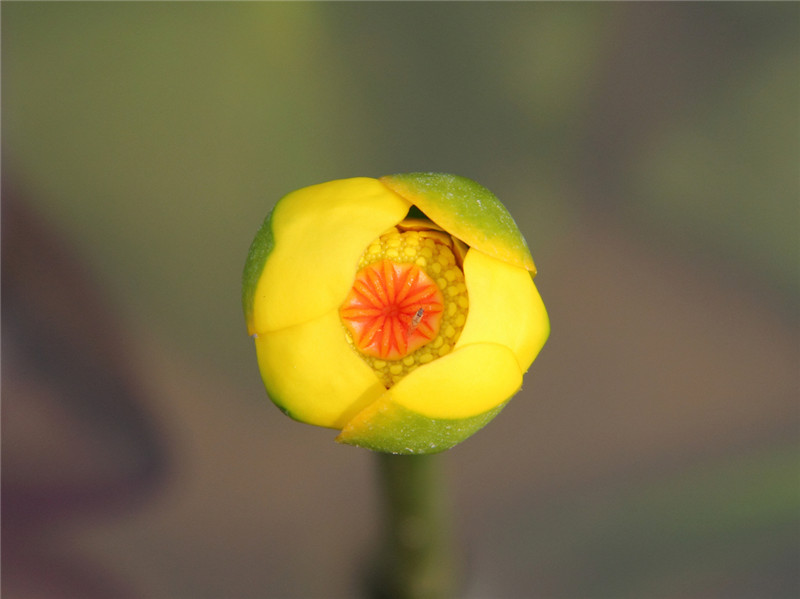
Nuphar pumila 2014 in China

Time-lapse video of a water lily blooming

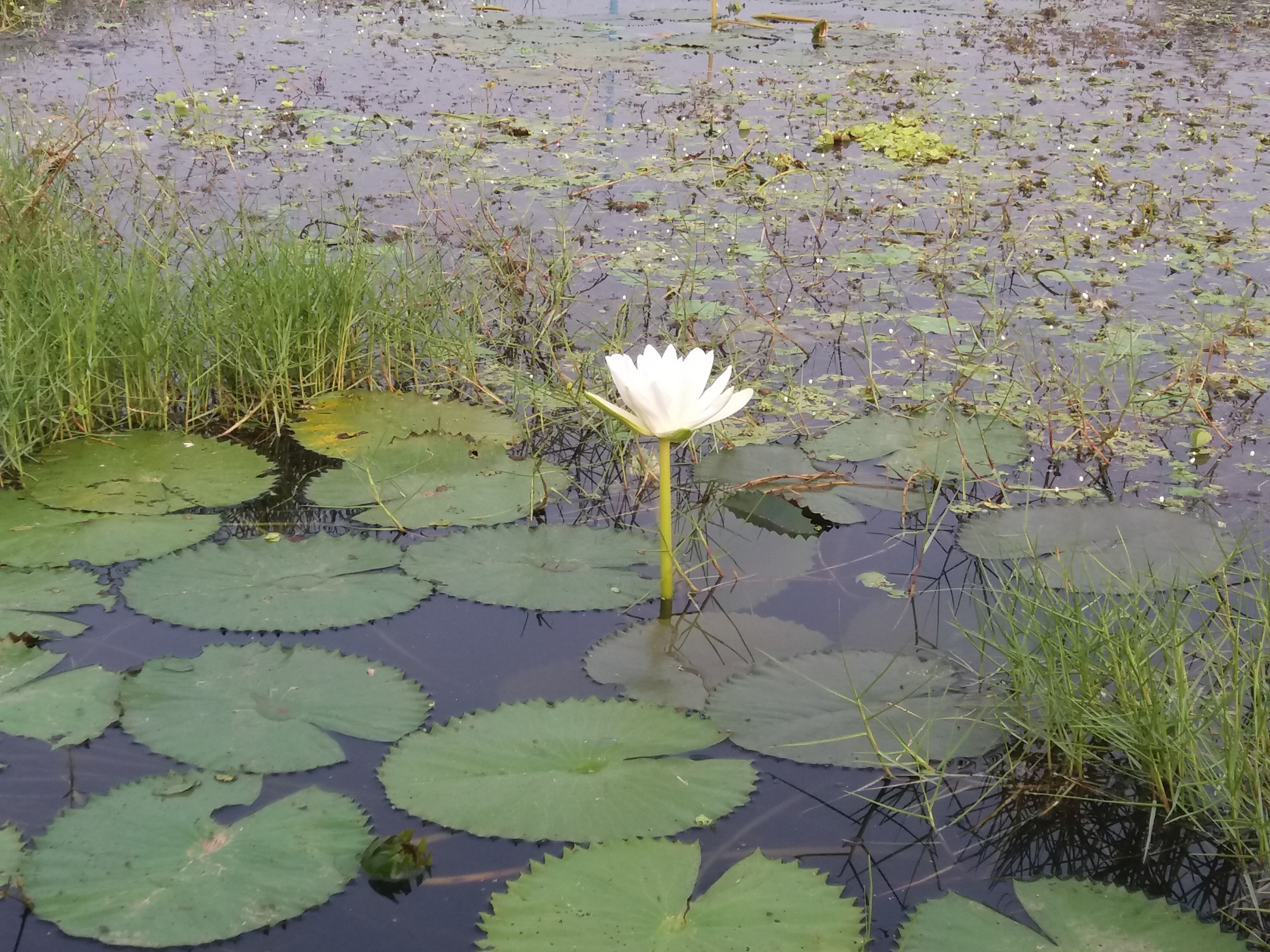
Water lily blooming in Sankarpur of West Bengal

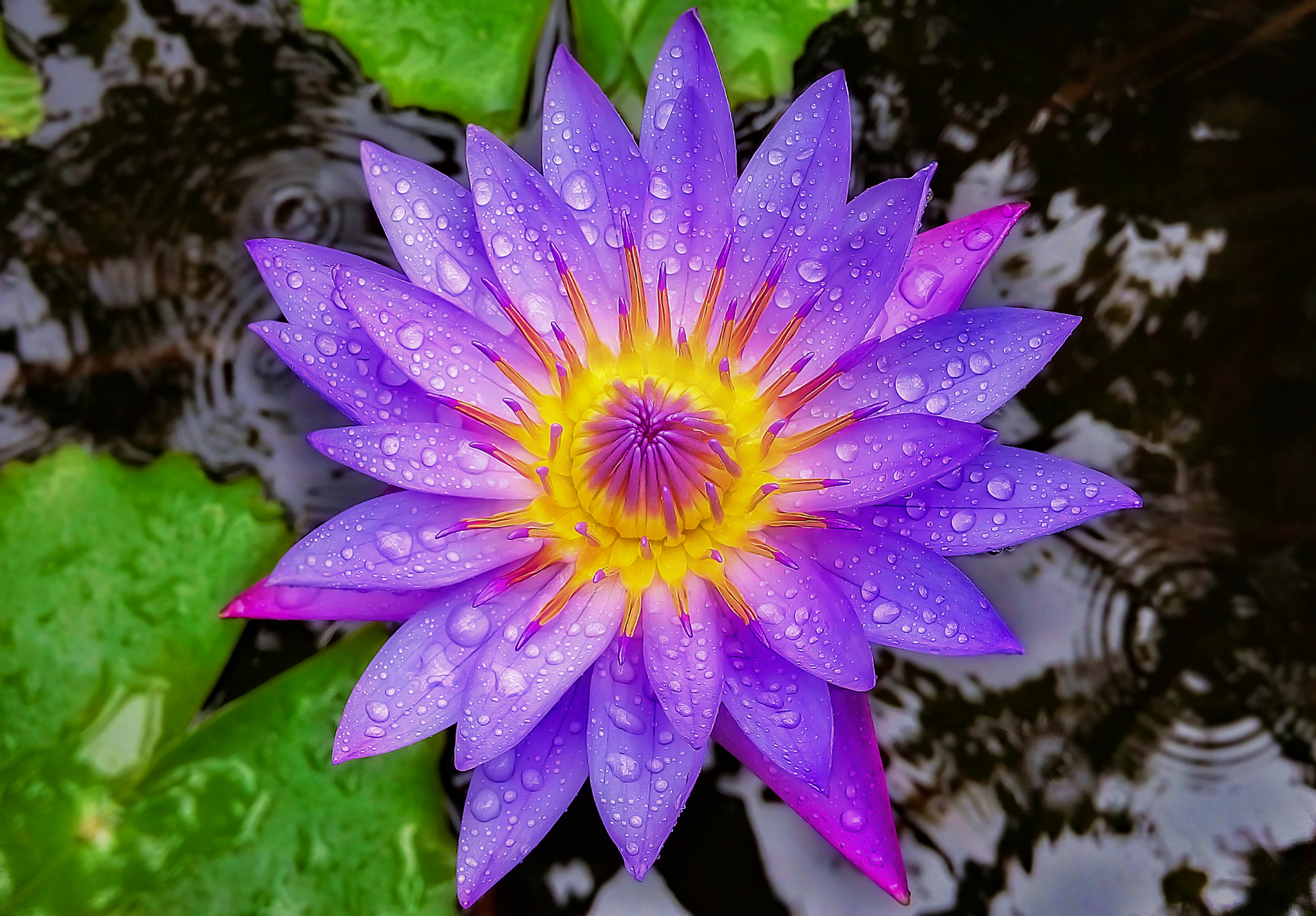
Blue water lily of Bangladesh

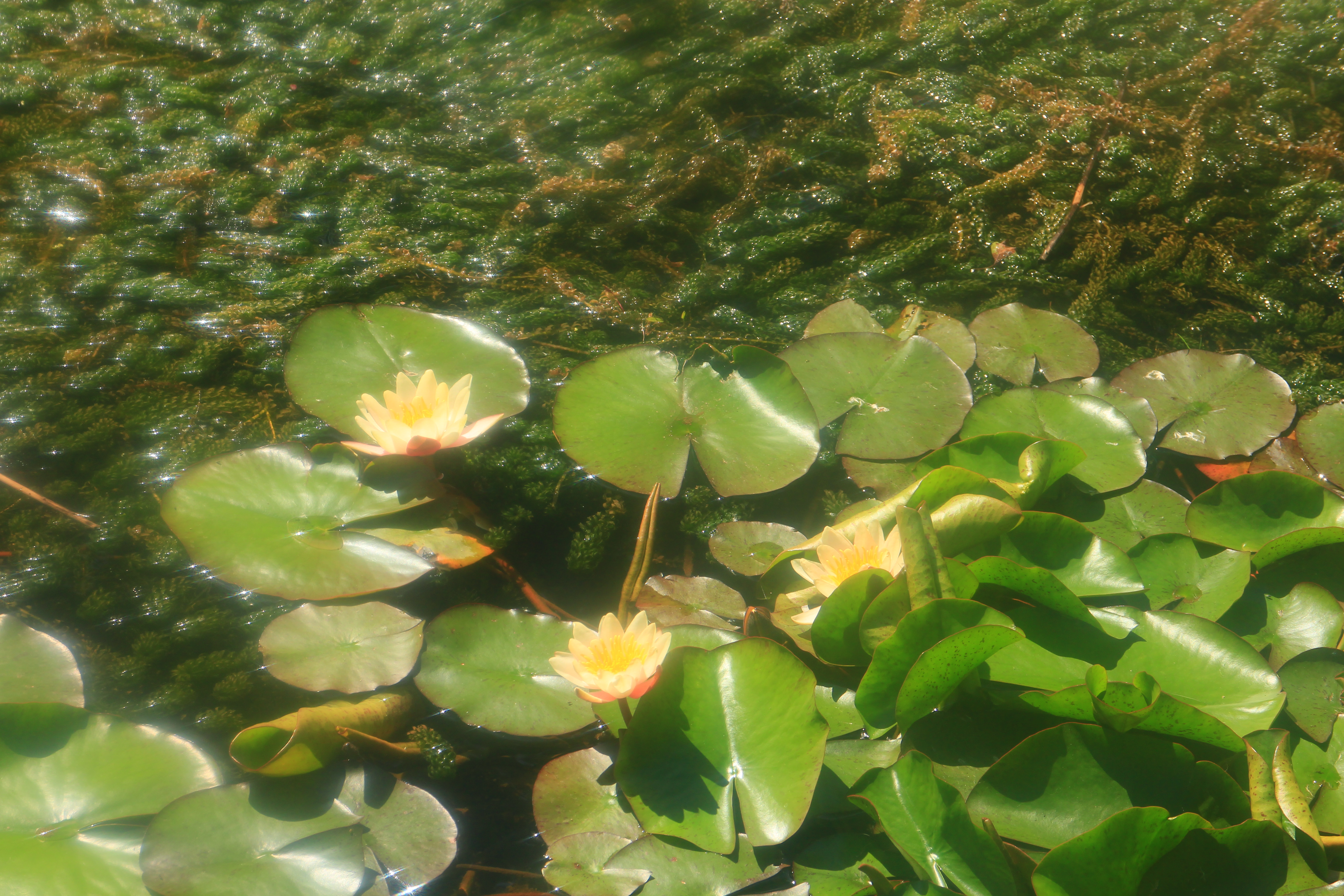
Yellow water lilies in Wales, 2021

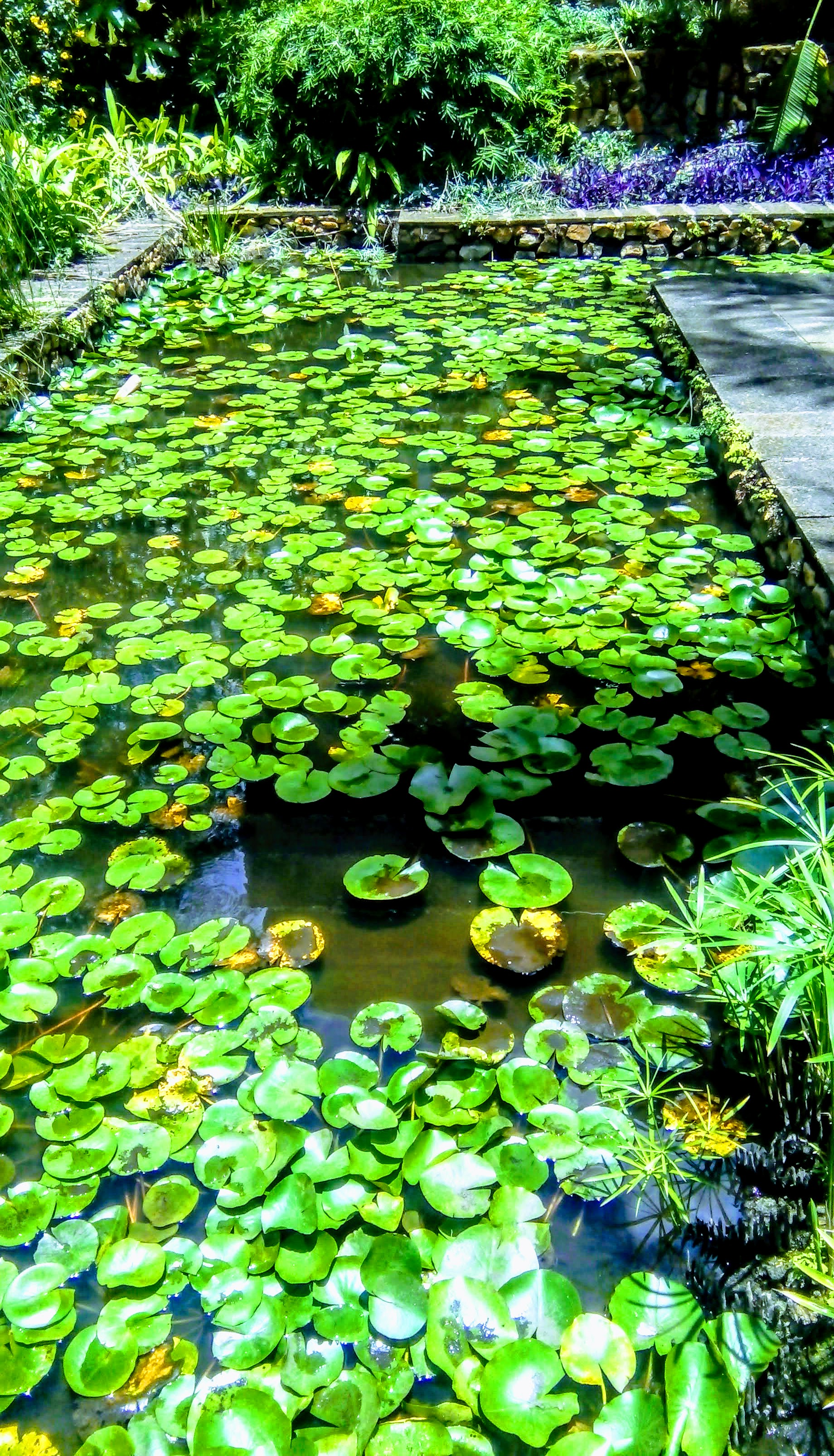
Water lilies in Nairobi, Kenya

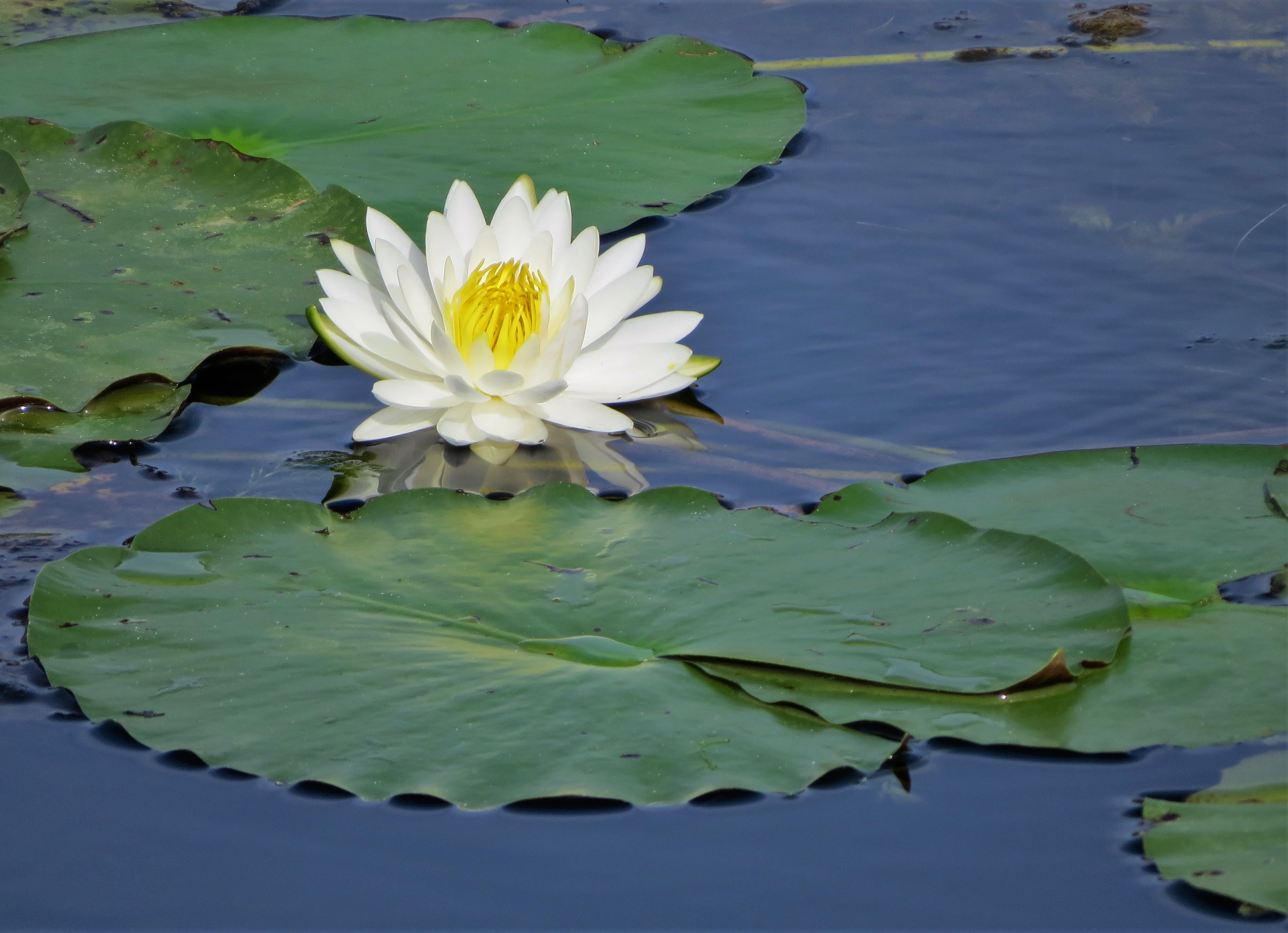
White Water Lily

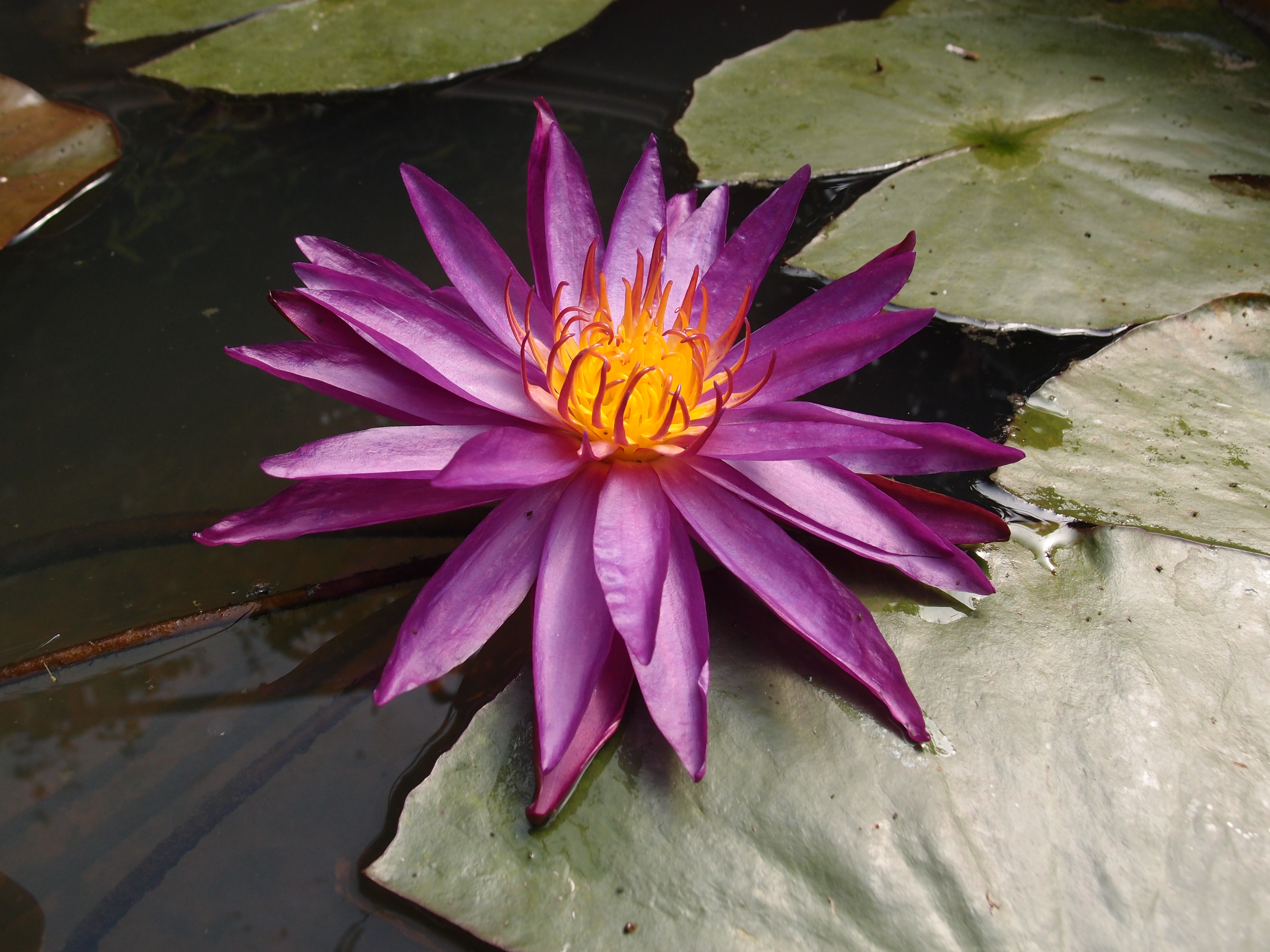
Nymphaea 'Detective Erika' in the jungle garden in France

== See also ==
- List of plants known as lily
- Nelumbo
- Pamplemousses Botanical Garden, famous for its giant water lilies
