= Yangzhong Puffer Fish =

- Year: 2013
- Medium: Bronze sculpture
- Subject: Puffer fish
- Location: Jiangsu Province, China; 32.1973°N 119.8277°E

The Yangzhong Puffer Fish, also known as the Puffer Fish Tower, is a 295 ft (90 m) long bronze statue in the shape of the puffer fish. Weighing 2,300 tons and reportedly costing $11 million, this statue sits on the banks of the Yangtze River in Yangzhong, Jiangsu, China. Work on this project was completed in 2013. Yangzhong is a centre for pufferfish aquaculture and cuisine.

As of 2013 it was the largest steel-framework sculpture in China, and perhaps the entire world.

== See also ==
- Wahpper, a catfish sculpture in the United States
