= Nuphaea =

Nuphaea Temporal range: 48.2 Ma Eocene

Scientific classification
- Kingdom: Plantae
- Clade: Tracheophytes
- Clade: Angiosperms
- Order: Nymphaeales
- Family: Nymphaeaceae
- Genus: †Nuphaea; Gee et David W. Taylor
- Species: †N. engelhardtii

Binomial name
- †Nuphaea engelhardtii Gee et David W. Taylor

Species of aquatic plant

Nuphaea engelhardtii was a species of aquatic plant, which occurred in the Eocene period of Germany.

== Description ==
=== Vegetative characteristics ===
Nuphaea engelhardtii was an aquatic plant with petiolate, macrophyllous, simple, ovate leaves with an entire margin. The base of the lamina is cordate. The leaves have a prominent medial vein.

== Taxonomy ==
=== Publication ===
It was published by Carole T. Gee and David Winship Taylor in 2019.

=== Type specimen ===
The type specimen was collected by Hermann Engelhardt in the Messel Pit, Hessen, Germany.

=== Position within Nymphaeales ===
It is placed within the family Nymphaeaceae.

== Etymology ==
The generic name Nuphaea reflects the intermediate position of the genus between the genera Nuphar and Nymphaea. The specific epithet engelhardtii honours the German paleobotanist Hermann Engelhardt (1839–1918).

== Ecology ==
=== Habitat ===
It grew at the edges of the Messel lake.
