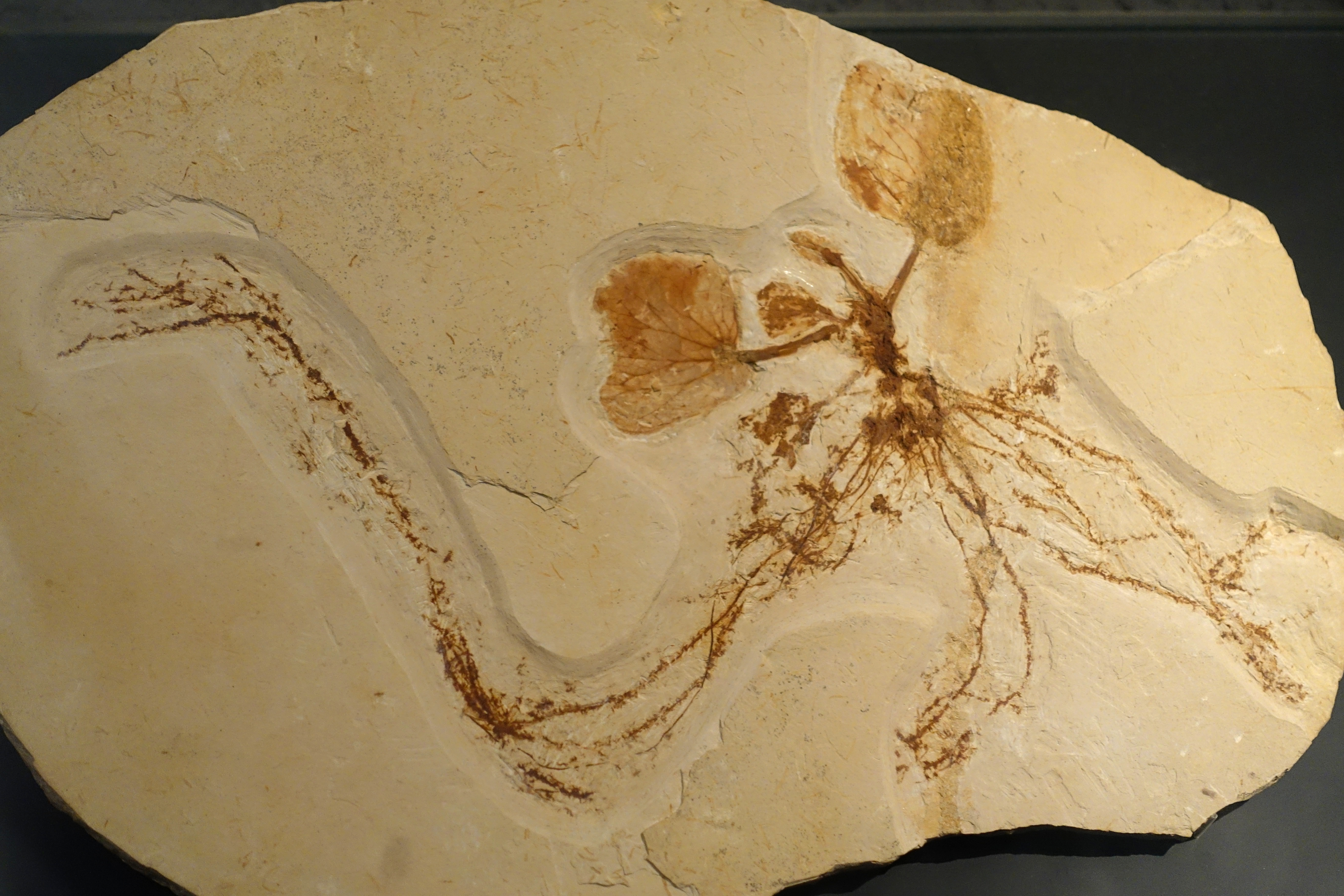
- Jaguariba wiersemana

Scientific classification
- Kingdom: Plantae
- Clade: Tracheophytes
- Clade: Angiosperms
- Order: Nymphaeales
- Family: Nymphaeaceae
- Genus: Jaguariba; Coiffard, B.A.R. Mohr & Bernardes-de-Oliveira
- Species: †J. wiersemana

Binomial name
- †Jaguariba wiersemana Coiffard, B.A.R. Mohr & Bernardes-de-Oliveira

= Jaguariba =

Jaguariba Temporal range: 145–100.5 Ma Early Cretaceous

Species of aquatic plant

Jaguariba wiersemana was a species of herbaceous, rhizomatous, aquatic plant, which occurred in the early Cretaceous period of Northern Gondwana.

== Description ==
=== Vegetative characteristics ===
Jaguariba wiersemana was an aquatic herbaceous plant with up to 15 mm wide rhizomes and up to 1.5 mm wide adventitious roots. The petiolate, alternately arranged, simple leaves had elliptic-ovate, 16-53 mm long, and 19-69 mm wide leaf blades. The petioles were 42-118 mm long, and 2-6 mm wide. The leaf venation was actinodromous.

== Taxonomy ==
=== Publication ===
It was first described by Clément Coiffard, Barbara Adelheid Rosina Mohr, and Mary Elizabeth Cerruti Bernardes-de-Oliveira in 2013.

=== Type specimen ===
The holotype is kept in the Museum für Naturkunde, Berlin. The type locality is Nova Olinda, Brazil.

=== Position within Nymphaeales ===
It is placed within the family Nymphaeaceae.

== Etymology ==
The generic name Jaguariba is derived from Rio Jaguaribe in Ceará, Brazil. The specific epithet wiersemana honours John Harry Wiersema.
