= Jim Pederson (American football) =

American football player (1907–1978)

No. 11, 17
- Position: Back

Personal information
- Born: October 19, 1907; Harvey, North Dakota, U.S.
- Died: August 14, 1978 (aged 70); Pawtucket, Rhode Island, U.S.
- Listed height: 5 ft 9 in (1.75 m)
- Listed weight: 189 lb (86 kg)

Career information
- High school: Willmar (Willmar, Minnesota)
- College: Augsburg

Career history
- Minneapolis Red Jackets (1930); Frankford Yellow Jackets (1930–1931); Chicago Bears (1932)
- Stats at Pro Football Reference

James Palmer Pederson (October 19, 1907 – August 14, 1978) was an American professional football back who played three seasons in the National Football League (NFL) with the Minneapolis Red Jackets, Frankford Yellow Jackets and Chicago Bears. He played college football and basketball at Augsburg College.

== Early life and college ==
James Palmer Pederson was born on October 19, 1907, in Harvey, North Dakota. He attended Willmar High School in Willmar, Minnesota.

Pederson played college football and basketball at Augsburg College.

== Professional career ==
Pederson played in seven games, starting five, for the Minneapolis Red Jackets of the National Football League (NFL) in 1930.

Pederson finished the 1930 NFL season by playing in four games (three starts) with Frankford Yellow Jackets. He played in all eight games, starting seven, for the Yellow Jackets in 1931. Frankford finished the 1931 season with a 1–6–1 record.

Pederson appeared in one game for the Chicago Bears of the NFL in 1932, rushing once for two yards.

== Coaching career ==
Pederson was the head football coach at Augsburg from 1933 to 1934, accumulating an overall record of 0–10. He was also the athletic director at Augsburg from April 1933 to May 1938, and the school's basketball coach from 1934 to 1936. He was inducted into the Augsburg Athletic Hall of Fame in 1973 and the Minnesota Football Coaches Association Hall of Fame in 1976.

== Personal life ==
Pederson died on August 14, 1978, in Pawtucket, Rhode Island.

== Head coaching record ==
=== Football ===
Year	Team	Overall	Conference	Standing	Bowl/playoffs
Augsburg Auggies (Minnesota Intercollegiate Athletic Conference) (1933–1934)
1933	Augsburg	0–5	0–5	9th	
1934	Augsburg	0–5	0–5	9th	
Augsburg:		0–10	0–10		
Total:		0–10			
