= Yangzhong =

Yangzhong 扬中市
- County-level city
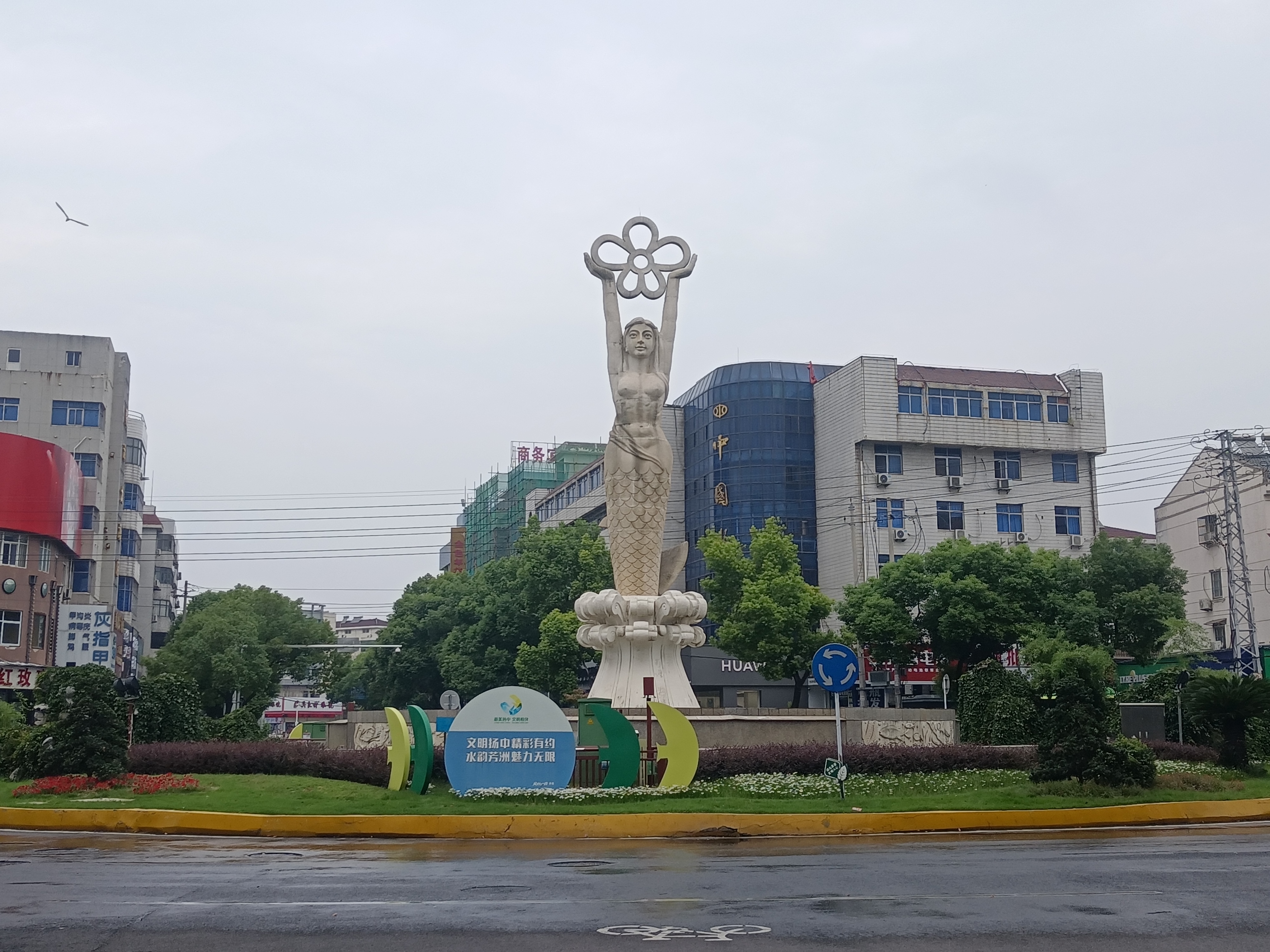

- Location in Jiangsu
- Coordinates: 32°14′13″N 119°48′54″E
- Country: People's Republic of China
- Province: Jiangsu
- Prefecture-level city: Zhenjiang

Area
  - Total: 332 km^{2} (128 sq mi)
  - Land: 228 km^{2} (88 sq mi)
  - Water: 104 km^{2} (40 sq mi)

Population
  - Total: 343,900
  - Density: 1,510/km^{2} (3,910/sq mi)
- Time zone: UTC+8 (China Standard)
- Postal code: 212200

Yangzhong (simplified Chinese: 扬中; traditional Chinese: 揚中; pinyin: Yángzhōng; lit. 'Yang[tze] middle') is a county-level city under the administration of Zhenjiang, Jiangsu province, China. It is the easternmost county-level division of Zhenjiang City.

== History ==
There were only several smaller shoals in the area of present-day Yangzhong during the Eastern Jin. As time went on, they enlarged and merged into an elongated shoal by Tang dynasty, which was called Xiaozhou (小洲; literally: "Small shoal") in Song dynasty. It was renamed Xinzhou (新洲) and then Ximinzhou (細民洲) during Ming dynasty, and was designated Taipingzhou (太平洲) in Qing dynasty.

In 1904, the imperial court decided to establish a subprefecture named after Taiping. In 1911, it was promoted to a county. Since there is a namesake in Anhui. The county was renamed Yangzhong, the abbreviation of "揚子江中" which means "(the shoal is) in the Yangtze River".

=== Overview ===
- In 1938, the Japanese army captured the county, then it was governed by the pro-Japanese collaborators.
- In 1939, the Jiangnan Counter-Japanese Volunteers' Army attacked the county, then the Nationalist Government controlled it.
- In 1940, the Japanese army recaptured the county.
- In July 1945, the force of CPC overthrew the puppet county government, but the Nationalist Government controlled the county in December.
- On 22 April 1949, the PLA captured the county.
- In 1994, the county was turned into a county-level city.

== Administrative divisions ==
At present, Yangzhong City has 5 towns and 1 other.

5 towns

- Xinba (新坝镇)
- Sanmao (三茅镇)
- Youfang (油坊镇)
- Baqiao (八桥镇)
- Xilaiqiao (西来桥镇)

1 other

- Yangzhong Economic Development Zone (扬中经济开发区)

== Climate ==
Climate data for Yangzhong, elevation 3 m (9.8 ft), (1991–2020 normals, extremes 1981–present)
Month	Jan	Feb	Mar	Apr	May	Jun	Jul	Aug	Sep	Oct	Nov	Dec	Year
Record high °C (°F)	21.0 (69.8)	26.0 (78.8)	33.7 (92.7)	33.2 (91.8)	35.6 (96.1)	37.5 (99.5)	38.5 (101.3)	38.6 (101.5)	37.5 (99.5)	32.6 (90.7)	28.9 (84.0)	22.4 (72.3)	38.6 (101.5)
Mean daily maximum °C (°F)	7.1 (44.8)	9.6 (49.3)	14.4 (57.9)	20.6 (69.1)	26.1 (79.0)	29.0 (84.2)	32.0 (89.6)	31.3 (88.3)	27.5 (81.5)	22.6 (72.7)	16.5 (61.7)	9.8 (49.6)	20.5 (69.0)
Daily mean °C (°F)	3.2 (37.8)	5.3 (41.5)	9.7 (49.5)	15.5 (59.9)	21.0 (69.8)	24.7 (76.5)	28.2 (82.8)	27.7 (81.9)	23.5 (74.3)	18.1 (64.6)	12.0 (53.6)	5.6 (42.1)	16.2 (61.2)
Mean daily minimum °C (°F)	0.3 (32.5)	2.0 (35.6)	5.8 (42.4)	11.1 (52.0)	16.7 (62.1)	21.4 (70.5)	25.2 (77.4)	24.8 (76.6)	20.3 (68.5)	14.4 (57.9)	8.4 (47.1)	2.4 (36.3)	12.7 (54.9)
Record low °C (°F)	−9.0 (15.8)	−9.0 (15.8)	−5.1 (22.8)	−0.4 (31.3)	5.4 (41.7)	12.7 (54.9)	18.6 (65.5)	17.5 (63.5)	8.9 (48.0)	1.5 (34.7)	−3.6 (25.5)	−11.2 (11.8)	−11.2 (11.8)
Average precipitation mm (inches)	52.0 (2.05)	49.3 (1.94)	76.8 (3.02)	69.4 (2.73)	89.1 (3.51)	173.9 (6.85)	200.0 (7.87)	167.2 (6.58)	78.4 (3.09)	55.5 (2.19)	54.8 (2.16)	37.7 (1.48)	1,104.1 (43.47)
Average precipitation days (≥ 0.1 mm)	8.7	9.0	10.4	9.5	10.3	11.2	13.0	12.2	8.8	7.4	8.4	7.3	116.2
Average snowy days	3.1	2.4	0.8	0.1	0	0	0	0	0	0	0.2	1.1	7.7
Average relative humidity (%)	73	73	71	71	71	76	80	81	79	74	73	71	74
Mean monthly sunshine hours	132.6	130.5	160.1	185.3	195.8	152.8	193.2	204.4	175.7	174.3	148.2	145.0	1,997.9
Percentage possible sunshine	42	42	43	48	46	36	45	50	48	50	47	47	45
Source: China Meteorological Administration all-time January high

== Culture ==
Yangzhong is famous for its pufferfish aquaculture and cuisine. It is also home to a 2,300 ton giant bronze pufferfish sculpture. Each spring the city hosts a pufferfish food festival, which in 2018 attracted over 850,000 tourists.

== Parks ==
- Yangzhong Land Park
