= Barclayopsis =

Barclayopsis Temporal range: Maastrichtian–Paleocene

Scientific classification
- Kingdom: Plantae
- Clade: Tracheophytes
- Clade: Angiosperms
- Order: Nymphaeales
- Family: Nymphaeaceae
- Genus: †Barclayopsis; Erv. Knobl. & Mai
- Species: †B. urceolata

Binomial name
- †Barclayopsis urceolata Erv. Knobl. & Mai

Fossil species of aquatic plant

Barclayopsis urceolata is a fossil species of the family Nymphaeaceae from the Maastrichtian and Paleocene of Eisleben, Germany.

== Description ==
The oval to rounded, 2–3 mm wide seed has a up to 0.15 mm thick, two-layered testa.

== Taxonomy ==
It was published by Ervin Knobloch and Dieter Hans Mai in 1984.

=== Etymology ===
The specific epithet urceolata means urceolate, or jug-shaped.
