= Yangzhong Land Park =

Park in Yangzhong, China

Yangzhong Land Park (Chinese: 扬中国土公园) is a park in Yangzhong, China. The park is a tourist attraction, which includes leisure activities and entertainment.

== Location ==
The park is located downstream of the Yangtze River downstream, on the second largest island.

== Features ==
The design of the park reflects a water motif, and the garden borders a large pond shaped like a map of China. On the shore is a pavilion, a 100-meter corridor, and a rock garden. An exhibition displays farming tools and equipment. Visitors can fish in the pond, which contains many different Yangtze river fish species.
