= KHND =

- Harvey, North Dakota; United States
- Frequency: 1470 kHz
- Branding: The Mix

Programming
- Format: Adult contemporary
- Affiliations: Fox News Radio

Ownership
- Owner: Three Way Broadcasting, Inc.

History
- Call sign meaning: Harvey, ND

Technical information
- Licensing authority: FCC
- Facility ID: 53309
- Class: D
- Power: 1,000 watts day 161 watts night
- Transmitter coordinates: 47°45′23″N 99°55′06″W
- Translator: 99.5 K258DT (Harvey)

Links
- Public license information: Public file; LMS
- Webcast: Listen Live
- Website: www.khnd1470.com

KHND (1470 AM) is a radio station licensed to serve Harvey, North Dakota. The station is owned by Three Way Broadcasting, Inc. It airs an adult contemporary music format.

The station was assigned the KHND call letters by the Federal Communications Commission.
