= Harvey Power Plant =

- U.S. National Register of Historic Places
- Location within North Dakota Location within the United States
- Location: SE corner of US 52 Bus. and Judy Blvd., Harvey, North Dakota
- Coordinates: 47°45′56″N 99°55′17″W
- Built: 1930
- NRHP reference No.: 100005273
- Added to NRHP: June 5, 2020

The Harvey Power Plant, a former power plant in Harvey, North Dakota, was listed on the National Register of Historic Places in 2020.

It was built in 1930 and served Harvey and much of Wells County with electric power until 1954. It was the city's first and only power plant.

Its nomination for National Register listing was considered by the North Dakota State Historic Preservation Review Board, located in Bismarck, at its April 24, 2020 meeting via web conference. It was officially listed on June 5, 2020.

A webpage of Rosin Preservation states, as of February 2021, that:

This former Harvey power plant is being converted into a mental health “oasis” to serve this rural region of North Dakota. Once renovated, the building will serve as a physical symbol and metaphor for the mental and emotional healing offered within its walls.
