= Harvey, North Dakota =

City in North Dakota, United States

- City
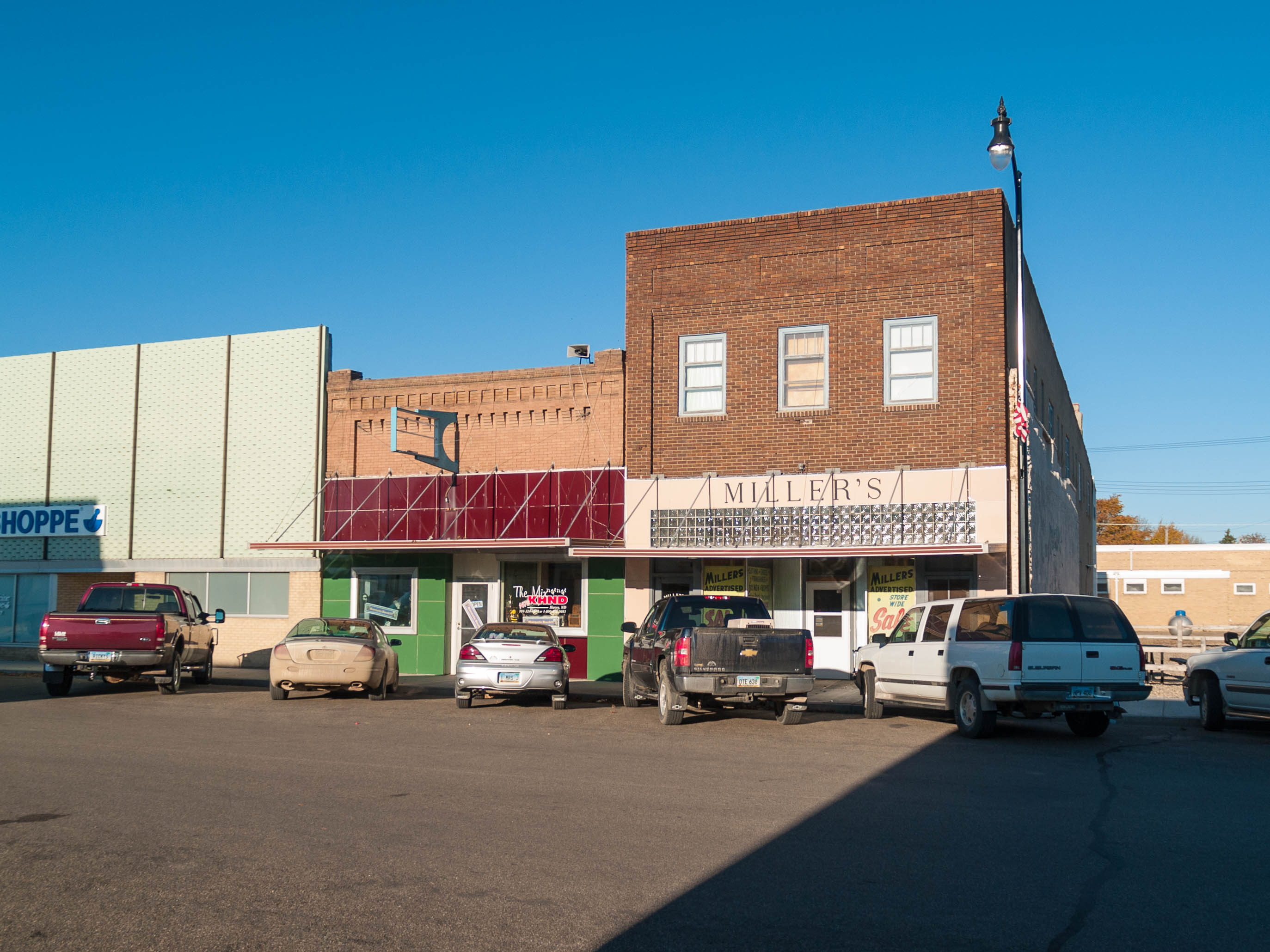
- Business district of Harvey

- Logo
- Nickname: "Gateway to the Lonetree Wildlife Management Area"
- Motto(s): "A Century of Community Pride & Spirit" "Not Just A Place...It's An Experience!"
- Location of Harvey, North Dakota
- Coordinates: 47°46′07″N 99°55′52″W
- Country: United States
- State: North Dakota
- County: Wells
- Founded: 1893

Government
  - Type: Mayor-Council Government
  - Body: Harvey City Council
  - Mayor: Dean Klier (Nonpartisan)

Area
  - Total: 1.80 sq mi (4.65 km^{2})
  - Land: 1.80 sq mi (4.65 km^{2})
  - Water: 0 sq mi (0.00 km^{2})
- Elevation: 1,598 ft (487 m)

Population (2020)
  - Total: 1,650
  - Estimate (2022): 1,621
  - Density: 918.5/sq mi (354.64/km^{2})
- Time zone: UTC–6 (Central (CST))
  - Summer (DST): UTC–5 (CDT)
- ZIP Code: 58341
- Area code: 701
- FIPS code: 38-35900
- GNIS feature ID: 1036083
- Highways: US 52, US 52 Bus., ND 3, ND 91
- Website: harveynd.com

Harvey is a city in Wells County, North Dakota, United States. The population was 1,650 at the 2020 census. Harvey was founded in 1893 as a division point by the Soo Line Railway. Harvey is believed to have been named for a director of the Soo Line Railway, Col. Scott William Harvey of Minneapolis, Minnesota.

== Geography ==
According to the United States Census Bureau, the city has a total area of 1.88 square miles (4.87 km^{2}), all land.

== Demographics ==
Historical population
Census	Pop.	Note	%±
1910	1,443		—
1920	1,590		10.2%
1930	2,157		35.7%
1940	1,851		−14.2%
1950	2,337		26.3%
1960	2,365		1.2%
1970	2,361		−0.2%
1980	2,527		7.0%
1990	2,263		−10.4%
2000	1,989		−12.1%
2010	1,783		−10.4%
2020	1,650		−7.5%
2022 (est.)	1,621		−1.8%
U.S. Decennial Census; 2020 Census

=== 2010 census ===
As of the census of 2010, there were 1,783 people, 824 households, and 476 families living in the city. The population density was 948.4 inhabitants per square mile (366.2/km^{2}). There were 997 housing units at an average density of 530.3 per square mile (204.7/km^{2}). The racial makeup of the city was 98.5% White, 0.1% African American, 0.6% Native American, 0.1% Pacific Islander, 0.1% from other races, and 0.7% from two or more races. Hispanic or Latino of any race were 1.0% of the population.

There were 824 households, of which 20.1% had children under the age of 18 living with them, 47.6% were married couples living together, 7.3% had a female householder with no husband present, 2.9% had a male householder with no wife present, and 42.2% were non-families. Of all households, 39.6% were made up of individuals, and 21.5% had someone living alone who was 65 years of age or older. The average household size was 2.03 and the average family size was 2.68.

The median age in the city was 51.5 years; 18.7% of residents were under the age of 18; 4.8% were between the ages of 18 and 24; 17.9% were from 25 to 44; 26.5% were from 45 to 64; and 32.2% were 65 years of age or older. The gender makeup of the city was 45.5% male and 54.5% female.

=== 2000 census ===
As of the census of 2000, there were 1,989 people, 926 households, and 529 families living in the city. The population density was 1,031.8 inhabitants per square mile (398.4/km^{2}). There were 1,056 housing units at an average density of 547.8 per square mile (211.5/km^{2}). The racial makeup of the city was 99.20% White, 0.50% Native American, 0.15% Asian, 0.05% from other races, and 0.10% from two or more races. Hispanic or Latino of any race were 0.50% of the population.

There were 926 households, out of which 21.5% had children under the age of 18 living with them, 49.6% were married couples living together, 5.7% had a female householder with no husband present, and 42.8% were non-families. Of all households 40.7% were made up of individuals, and 24.3% had someone living alone who was 65 years of age or older. The average household size was 2.03 and the average family size was 2.73.

In the city, the population was spread out, with 19.3% under the age of 18, 4.9% from 18 to 24, 21.0% from 25 to 44, 23.1% from 45 to 64, and 31.7% who were 65 years of age or older. The median age was 49 years. For every 100 females, there were 84.5 males. For every 100 females age 18 and over, there were 79.0 males.

The median income for a household in the city was $33,017, and the median income for a family was $45,250. Males had a median income of $31,429 versus $16,534 for females. The per capita income for the city was $21,477. About 6.6% of families and 12.0% of the population were below the poverty line, including 8.2% of those under age 18 and 24.4% of those age 65 or over.

== Radio ==
- KHND AM 1470, owned and operated by Three Way Broadcasting.

== Education ==
Harvey Public Schools operates public schools.

== Climate ==
This climatic region is typified by large seasonal temperature differences, with warm to hot (and often humid) summers and cold (sometimes severely cold) winters. According to the Köppen Climate Classification system, Harvey has a humid continental climate, abbreviated "Dfb" on climate maps.

Climate data for Harvey, North Dakota (1991–2020 normals, extremes 1979–present)
Month	Jan	Feb	Mar	Apr	May	Jun	Jul	Aug	Sep	Oct	Nov	Dec	Year
Record high °F (°C)	58 (14)	61 (16)	74 (23)	91 (33)	97 (36)	103 (39)	107 (42)	105 (41)	103 (39)	90 (32)	78 (26)	60 (16)	107 (42)
Mean daily maximum °F (°C)	16.9 (−8.4)	21.7 (−5.7)	34.6 (1.4)	51.9 (11.1)	66.3 (19.1)	75.0 (23.9)	80.5 (26.9)	79.6 (26.4)	70.5 (21.4)	54.1 (12.3)	35.7 (2.1)	21.9 (−5.6)	50.7 (10.4)
Daily mean °F (°C)	7.6 (−13.6)	11.7 (−11.3)	24.9 (−3.9)	40.4 (4.7)	54.1 (12.3)	63.9 (17.7)	68.7 (20.4)	66.6 (19.2)	57.5 (14.2)	42.4 (5.8)	26.1 (−3.3)	13.2 (−10.4)	39.8 (4.3)
Mean daily minimum °F (°C)	−1.8 (−18.8)	1.8 (−16.8)	15.1 (−9.4)	28.9 (−1.7)	42.0 (5.6)	52.9 (11.6)	56.9 (13.8)	53.7 (12.1)	44.5 (6.9)	30.8 (−0.7)	16.4 (−8.7)	4.4 (−15.3)	28.8 (−1.8)
Record low °F (°C)	−40 (−40)	−41 (−41)	−29 (−34)	−7 (−22)	16 (−9)	34 (1)	40 (4)	32 (0)	23 (−5)	−1 (−18)	−22 (−30)	−33 (−36)	−41 (−41)
Average precipitation inches (mm)	0.41 (10)	0.41 (10)	0.73 (19)	1.07 (27)	2.69 (68)	3.62 (92)	3.14 (80)	2.34 (59)	1.84 (47)	1.41 (36)	0.69 (18)	0.90 (23)	19.25 (489)
Source: NOAA

== Notable people ==
- John T. Davies, Minnesota state senator and jurist
- Ivan Dmitri (1900–1968), artist, best known for etching the Spirit of St. Louis
- Michael Forest, actor and voice personality
- Patrick E. Haggerty, co-founder of Texas Instruments
- Jud Heathcote, college basketball coach at Michigan State and Montana
- Jim Pederson, football player

== See also ==
- Harvey Power Plant
- Media in Minot, North Dakota
- Mighty Og
- North Dakota Highway 91—Shortest Highway in the Nation
