= Harvey Public Schools =

Public school district in North Dakota

Harvey Public School District #38, also known as Harvey Public Schools or Harvey 38 is a school district based in Harvey, North Dakota.

Its schools are Harvey Elementary School and Harvey High School.
