= Salem Sue =

Giant fiberglass-made cow sculpture located in United States

Coordinates: 46°51′10″N 101°25′34″W

- The World's Largest Holstein Cow
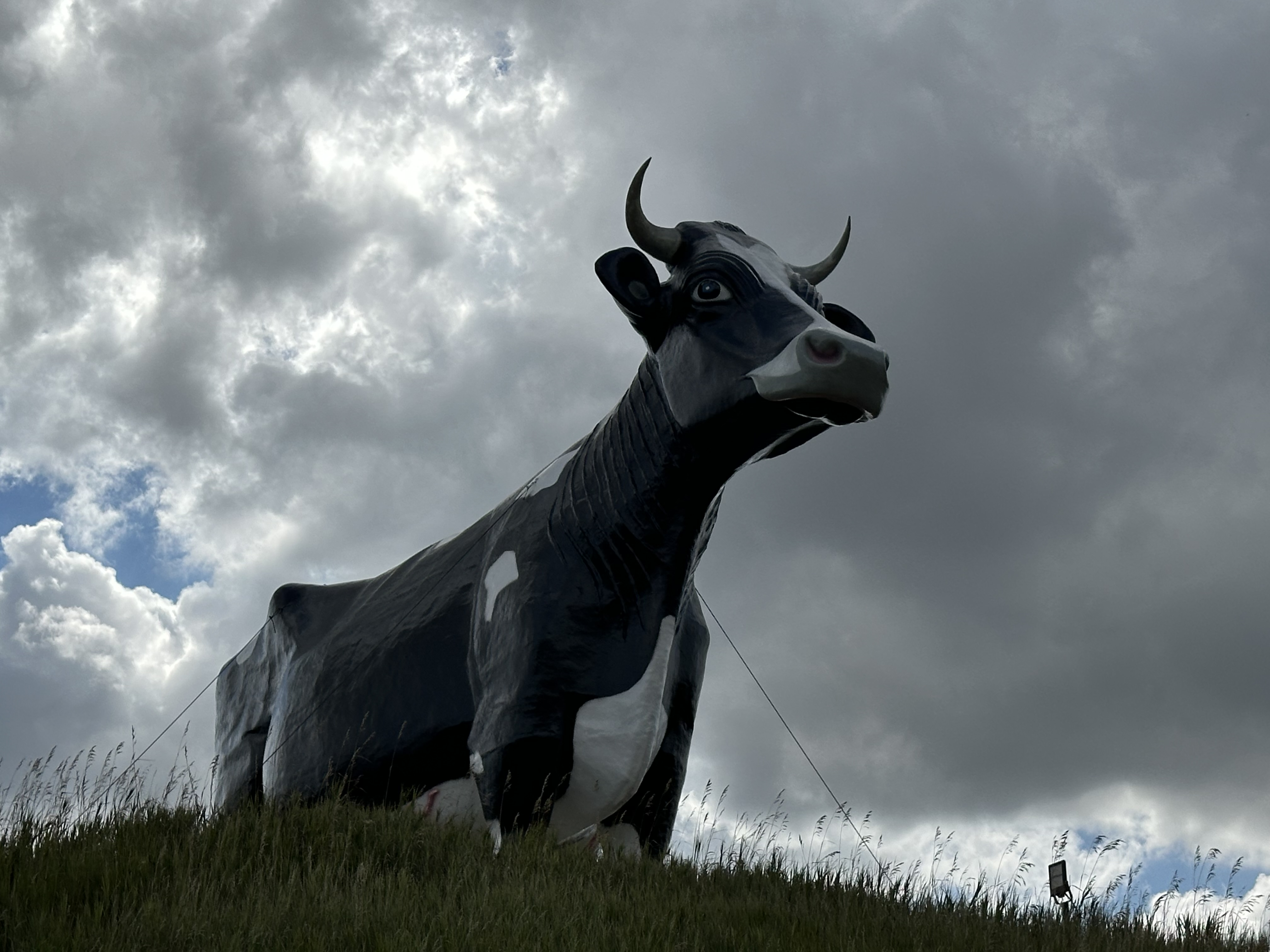
- Salem Sue, stands along I-94 in New Salem, 30 miles (48 km) west of Bismarck, North Dakota.
- Artist: Dave Oswald
- Year: 1974
- Dimensions: 50 feet (15 m) long x 38 feet (12 m) high
- Weight: 12,000 pounds (5,400 kg)

Salem Sue (or The World's Largest Holstein Cow) is a giant fiberglass Holstein cow sculpture located in New Salem, North Dakota, United States. Salem Sue was built in 1974 for $40,000, by donations from local farmers and residents, and was sponsored by the New Salem Lions Club in honor of the local dairy farming industry. The artist was Dave Oswald, who is also known for designing the world's largest catfish, which sits in Wahpeton, North Dakota. The cow, which is hollow, was constructed by Sculpture Mfg. Co in La Crosse, Wisconsin and then transported in 3 parts before being put together. The statue stands 38 feet (12 m) high and 50 feet (15 m) long and weighs about 12,000 pounds (5,400 kg). It sits on School Hill near Interstate 94 off exit 127 S and can be viewed for several miles.

Salem Sue was the second giant roadside animal sculpture built in North Dakota, after the world's largest buffalo was erected in Jamestown, North Dakota in 1959.

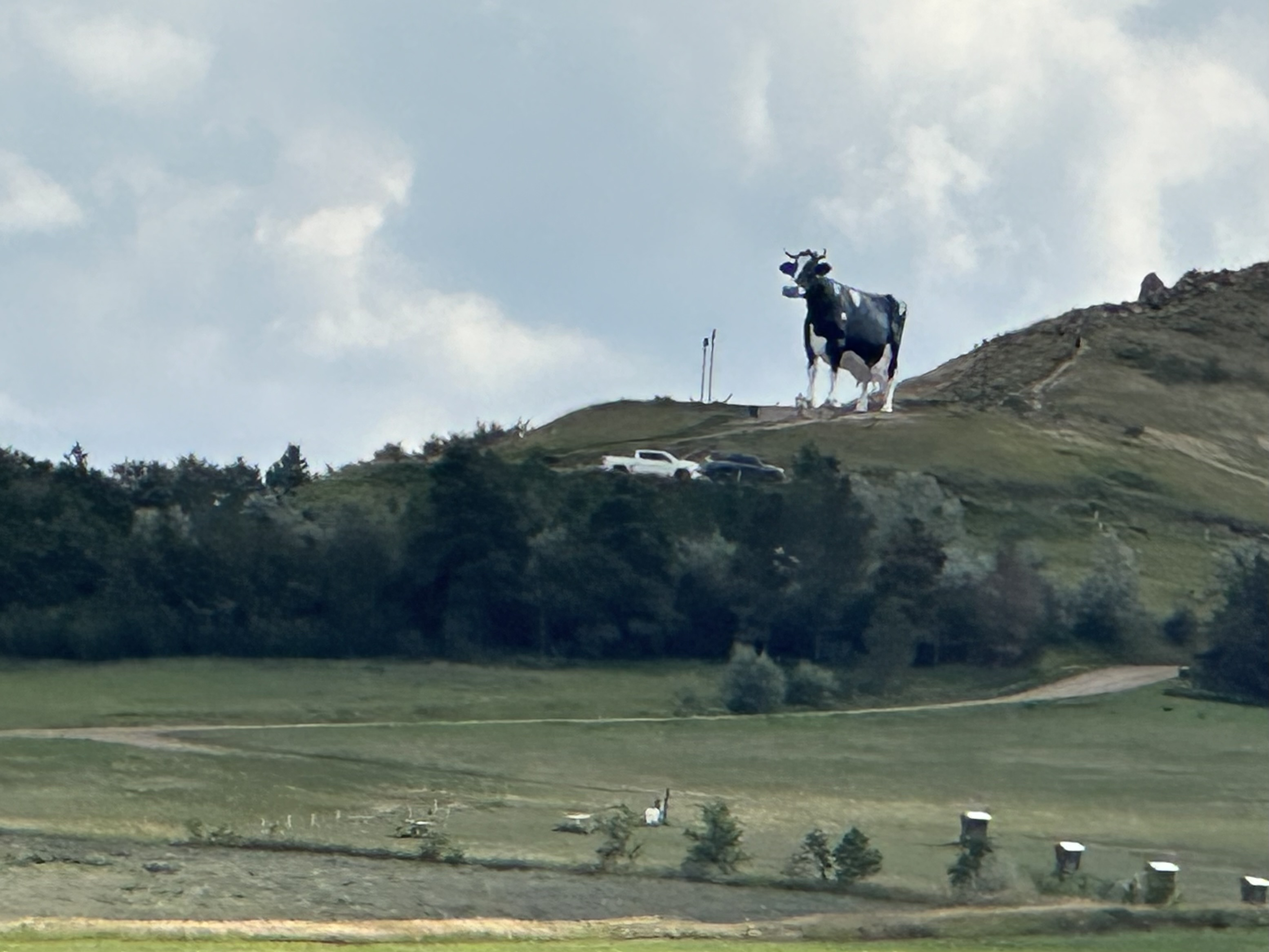
Salem Sue as seen from highway I-94.

A road leads up to the base of the statue, where one may view the surrounding terrain. Although it is free to visit, an at-will donation bin, shaped like a milk can, sits at the bottom of the hill to help maintain the property and re-paint the cow as needed.

A brochure available at the nearby gas station contains the "Ballad of the Holstein" to the tune of "Joy to the World":

We've got the world's largest Holstein cow, that looks across our fields.

Her presence shows that New Salem grows

with milk-producers' yields, with milk-producers' yields, with milk-producers' yields.

The genus of fossil plant †Susiea Taylor, DeVore & Pigg was named after Salem Sue.

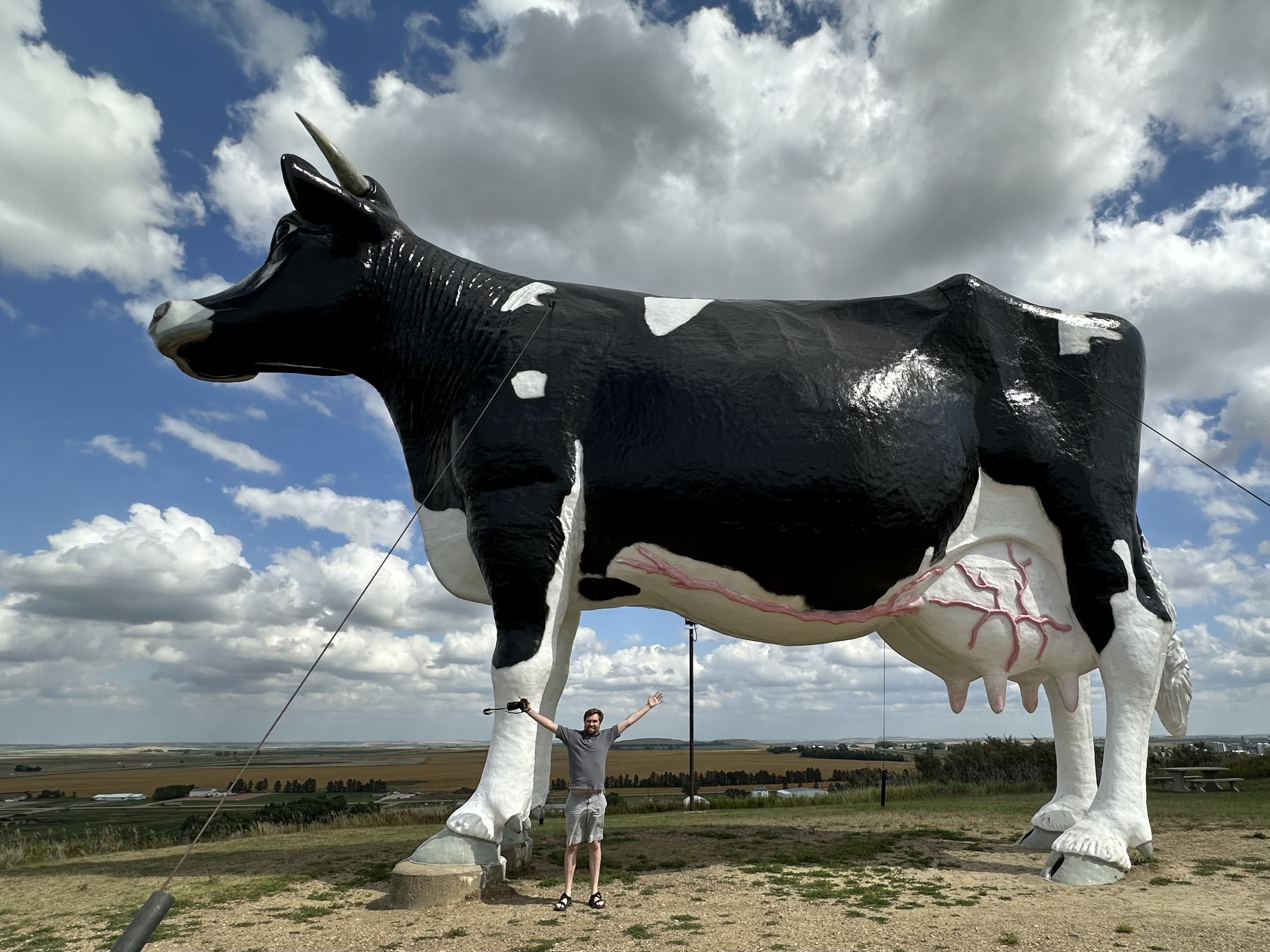
The size of Salem Sue.
