= New Salem, North Dakota =

- City
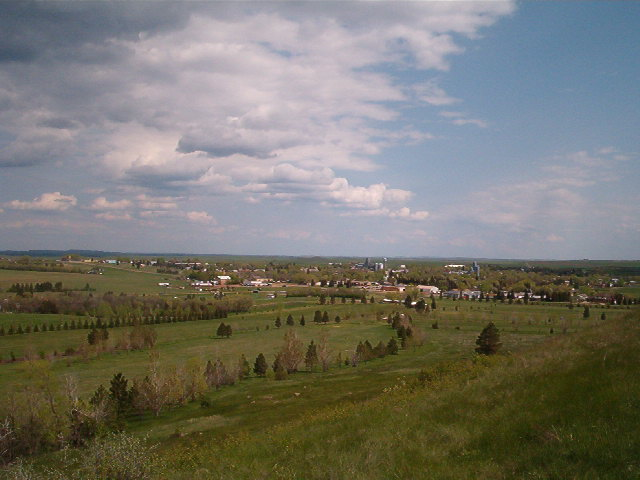
- New Salem, North Dakota

- Logo
- Motto: Building Family, Building Business, Building Future
- Location of New Salem, North Dakota
- Coordinates: 46°50′35″N 101°25′04″W
- Country: United States
- State: North Dakota
- County: Morton
- Founded: 1883

Government
  - Mayor: Josh Gaebe

Area
  - Total: 1.40 sq mi (3.62 km^{2})
  - Land: 1.39 sq mi (3.59 km^{2})
  - Water: 0.012 sq mi (0.03 km^{2})
- Elevation: 2,162 ft (659 m)

Population (2020)
  - Total: 973
  - Estimate (2025): 1,158
  - Density: 702.7/sq mi (271.31/km^{2})
- Time zone: UTC-6 (Central (CST))
  - Summer (DST): UTC-5 (CDT)
- ZIP code: 58563
- Area code: 701
- FIPS code: 38-56700
- GNIS feature ID: 1036183
- Website: newsalem-nd.com

New Salem is a city in Morton County, North Dakota, United States. It is part of the "Bismarck, North Dakota Metropolitan Statistical Area" or "Bismarck-Mandan". New Salem is approximately 24 miles west of Mandan and 31 miles west of Bismarck. The population was 973 at the 2020 census, and was estimated to be 1,158 in 2025. New Salem was founded in 1883.

== History ==
New Salem began in April 1882 when John Christiansen hopped off a westbound freight train. The only sign of civilization he saw were the train tracks behind him and the belongings he brought. Soon after his arrival a Colonization Bureau out of Chicago sent settlers to the area and gave the colony its independence for $600. A church, land office, lumber yard, drugstore, and general store were soon built, and by the end of 1883, the town was ready for Great Plains living.

== Geography ==
According to the United States Census Bureau, the city has a total area of 1.47 square miles (3.81 km^{2}), of which, 1.46 square miles (3.78 km^{2}) is land and 0.01 square miles (0.03 km^{2}) is water.

New Salem is one mile south of Interstate 94.

=== Climate ===
Climate data for New Salem 5NW, North Dakota (1991–2020 normals, extremes 1893–present)
Month	Jan	Feb	Mar	Apr	May	Jun	Jul	Aug	Sep	Oct	Nov	Dec	Year
Record high °F (°C)	62 (17)	68 (20)	85 (29)	92 (33)	105 (41)	110 (43)	119 (48)	108 (42)	106 (41)	96 (36)	82 (28)	66 (19)	119 (48)
Mean daily maximum °F (°C)	21.2 (−6.0)	26.2 (−3.2)	38.6 (3.7)	53.6 (12.0)	66.1 (18.9)	75.4 (24.1)	82.6 (28.1)	82.2 (27.9)	72.4 (22.4)	55.9 (13.3)	39.1 (3.9)	26.0 (−3.3)	53.3 (11.8)
Daily mean °F (°C)	11.5 (−11.4)	16.0 (−8.9)	28.1 (−2.2)	41.3 (5.2)	53.4 (11.9)	63.0 (17.2)	69.3 (20.7)	68.1 (20.1)	58.6 (14.8)	43.6 (6.4)	28.6 (−1.9)	16.5 (−8.6)	41.5 (5.3)
Mean daily minimum °F (°C)	1.8 (−16.8)	5.8 (−14.6)	17.6 (−8.0)	29.0 (−1.7)	40.6 (4.8)	50.6 (10.3)	55.9 (13.3)	54.1 (12.3)	44.8 (7.1)	31.3 (−0.4)	18.1 (−7.7)	7.0 (−13.9)	29.7 (−1.3)
Record low °F (°C)	−43 (−42)	−41 (−41)	−30 (−34)	−14 (−26)	10 (−12)	24 (−4)	32 (0)	30 (−1)	10 (−12)	−10 (−23)	−26 (−32)	−40 (−40)	−43 (−42)
Average precipitation inches (mm)	0.38 (9.7)	0.43 (11)	0.71 (18)	1.50 (38)	2.66 (68)	3.45 (88)	2.83 (72)	2.16 (55)	1.73 (44)	1.38 (35)	0.58 (15)	0.52 (13)	18.33 (466)
Average snowfall inches (cm)	6.8 (17)	6.5 (17)	7.6 (19)	5.0 (13)	0.8 (2.0)	0.0 (0.0)	0.0 (0.0)	0.0 (0.0)	0.0 (0.0)	3.2 (8.1)	5.7 (14)	8.9 (23)	44.5 (113)
Average precipitation days (≥ 0.01 in)	5.9	6.4	7.0	7.7	10.8	11.7	10.0	8.2	7.5	7.6	5.8	6.9	95.5
Average snowy days (≥ 0.1 in)	7.9	8.1	6.0	2.7	0.5	0.0	0.0	0.0	0.1	2.1	5.3	8.4	41.1
Source: NOAA

== Demographics ==
Historical population
Census	Pop.	Note	%±
1900	229		—
1910	621		171.2%
1920	711		14.5%
1930	804		13.1%
1940	875		8.8%
1950	942		7.7%
1960	986		4.7%
1970	943		−4.4%
1980	1,081		14.6%
1990	909		−15.9%
2000	938		3.2%
2010	946		0.9%
2020	973		2.9%
2023 (est.)	1,027		5.5%
U.S. Decennial Census; 2020 Census

=== 2010 census ===
As of the census of 2010, there were 946 people, 404 households, and 241 families residing in the city. The population density was 647.9 inhabitants per square mile (250.2/km^{2}). There were 449 housing units at an average density of 307.5 per square mile (118.7/km^{2}). The racial makeup of the city was 96.4% White, 2.3% Native American, 0.1% Asian, 0.1% from other races, and 1.1% from two or more races. Hispanic or Latino of any race were 1.2% of the population.

There were 404 households, of which 25.0% had children under the age of 18 living with them, 50.0% were married couples living together, 5.9% had a female householder with no husband present, 3.7% had a male householder with no wife present, and 40.3% were non-families. 36.6% of all households were made up of individuals, and 20.1% had someone living alone who was 65 years of age or older. The average household size was 2.18 and the average family size was 2.83.

The median age in the city was 48.2 years. 20.9% of residents were under the age of 18; 5.2% were between the ages of 18 and 24; 19.9% were from 25 to 44; 24.2% were from 45 to 64; and 29.7% were 65 years of age or older. The gender makeup of the city was 47.5% male and 52.5% female.

=== 2000 census ===
As of the census of 2000, there were 938 people, 411 households, and 246 families residing in the city. The population density was 649.0 inhabitants per square mile (250.6/km^{2}). There were 448 housing units at an average density of 310.0 per square mile (119.7/km^{2}). The racial makeup of the city was 97.23% White, 1.71% Native American, and 1.07% from two or more races.

There were 411 households, out of which 21.4% had children under the age of 18 living with them, 54.3% were married couples living together, 4.4% had a female householder with no husband present, and 40.1% were non-families. 38.7% of all households were made up of individuals, and 25.8% had someone living alone who was 65 years of age or older. The average household size was 2.14 and the average family size was 2.83.

In the city, the population was spread out, with 21.1% under the age of 18, 2.9% from 18 to 24, 21.0% from 25 to 44, 20.6% from 45 to 64, and 34.4% who were 65 years of age or older. The median age was 49 years. For every 100 females, there were 85.0 males. For every 100 females age 18 and over, there were 81.4 males.

The median income for a household in the city was $26,848, and the median income for a family was $36,761. Males had a median income of $27,446 versus $19,091 for females. The per capita income for the city was $16,514. About 9.4% of families and 9.2% of the population were below the poverty line, including 5.2% of those under age 18 and 20.9% of those age 65 or over.

== Government ==
New Salem is a mayor-council style of government, which one mayor and six council members. The mayor is Josh Gaebe. The at-large council members are Delton Kautzman, Chad Goetzfridt, Perrin Goetzfridt, Corey Lausch, Darrell Itrich, and Josh Gaebe. The town also has a parks board, planning and zoning committee, and building inspector.

On June 3, 2024, New Salem’s sitting mayor, Lynette Fitterer, died of natural causes. Following her death, Josh Gaebe filled the position.

== Education ==
It is served by the New Salem-Almont School District.

== Sites of interest ==
- Salem Sue, the world's largest Holstein cow
