= Cabomba haynesii =

- Secure (NatureServe)

Scientific classification
- Kingdom: Plantae
- Clade: Tracheophytes
- Clade: Angiosperms
- Order: Nymphaeales
- Family: Cabombaceae
- Genus: Cabomba
- Species: C. haynesii

Binomial name
- Cabomba haynesii Wiersema

Synonyms
- Cabomba piauhiensis f. albida Fassett

Species of aquatic plant

Cabomba haynesii is a species of aquatic plant in the family Cabombaceae native to the Caribbean, Central America, and South America.

== Description ==
=== Vegetative characteristics ===
Cabomba haynesii is an aquatic, rhizomatous, long-stemmed herb with both submerged and floating leaves. The pilose, green to red stems with red papillae at the nodes have two vascular bundles. The dissected, oppositely arranged, petiolate, submerged leaves are 0.5-0.9 cm long, and 1.4-1.8 cm wide. The glabrous petiole is 0.5-0.8 mm long.

=== Generative characteristics ===
The pinkish-purple to white, 1–1.5 cm wide flowers with 1.5-1.8 cm long pedicels float on the water surface, or extend beyond it. The base of the petals is auriculate. The flowers have 3 (5) stamens and (1–) 2 (–3) carpels. The oblong to ovoid seeds are 1.8-2.5 mm long, and 1-2 mm wide.

== Taxonomy ==
It was first described as Cabomba piauhiensis f. albida Fassett by Norman Carter Fassett in 1953. Later, it was described as the new species Cabomba haynesii Wiersema by John Harry Wiersema in 1989. The type specimen was collected by J. Steiner, C. von Chong, and H. Kennedy in the Chagres River in Gamboa, Panama on the 8th of February 1973.

== Hybridisation ==
It has been speculated that Cabomba haynesii may be a result of a hybridisation event involving Cabomba palaeformis and Cabomba furcata.

== Etymology ==
The specific epithet haynesii honours Robert R. Haynes.

== Ecology ==
=== Habitat ===
In Brazil, it is found in seasonally flooded lagoons, or in temporary or permanent standing bodies of water. It can occur in slightly brackish water.

== Conservattion ==
The NatureServe conservation status is G5 Secure.
