= Cabomba caroliniana var. pulcherrima =

- Herbarium specimen of Cabomba caroliniana var. pulcherrima

Scientific classification
- Kingdom: Plantae
- Clade: Tracheophytes
- Clade: Angiosperms
- Order: Nymphaeales
- Family: Cabombaceae
- Genus: Cabomba
- Species: C. caroliniana
- Variety: C. c. var. pulcherrima

Trinomial name
- Cabomba caroliniana var. pulcherrima R.M.Harper

Synonyms
- Cabomba pulcherrima (R. M. Harper) Fassett

Species of aquatic plant

Cabomba caroliniana var. pulcherrima is a species of perennial aquatic herb in the family Cabombaceae native to the American states Florida, South Carolina, North Carolina, and Georgia.

== Description ==
=== Vegetative characteristics ===
Cabomba caroliniana var. pulcherrima is a perennial aquatic herb with reddish-purple, 1 m long stems. Both floating and submerged leaves are produced. The submerged leaves are dark-coloured and have narrow segments. The peltate floating leaves are 1.5–3 mm wide.

=== Generative characteristics ===
The purple flowers are 7–10 mm long. The gynoecium consists of 3–4 carpels.

=== Cytology ===
The chromosome count is 2n = c. 78.

== Taxonomy ==
It was described by Roland McMillan Harper in 1903. The type specimen was collected by Harper in Georgia, USA on the 13th of August 1901. It was elevated to the species Cabomba pulcherrima (R.M.Harper) Fassett by Norman Carter Fassett in 1953, but this is widely not accepted. One source regards it as a synonym of Cabomba caroliniana var. caroliniana, others regard it as a synonym of Cabomba caroliniana, and some accepted the variety as a separate taxon. Its validity needs further investigation and it has been speculated the purple colouration may be a result of environmental conditions, such as warm water conditions. The colour also is diminished in low light conditions.

=== Etymology ===
The varietal name pulcherrima from the Latin pulcher means most beautiful.

== Distribution and habitat ==
It occurs in the American states Florida, South and North Carolina, and Georgia, where it occurs at low altitudes.
