= Cabomba caroliniana var. flavida =

Scientific classification
- Kingdom: Plantae
- Clade: Tracheophytes
- Clade: Angiosperms
- Order: Nymphaeales
- Family: Cabombaceae
- Genus: Cabomba
- Species: C. caroliniana
- Variety: C. c. var. flavida

Trinomial name
- Cabomba caroliniana var. flavida Morgaard

Species of aquatic plant

Cabomba caroliniana var. flavida is a species of aquatic herb native to Argentina, Brazil, and Paraguay.

== Description ==
=== Vegetative characteristics ===
Cabomba caroliniana var. flavida is an aquatic herb with green or sometimes reddish brown shoots.

=== Generative characteristics ===
The pale yellow flower is 6–15 mm wide, and 6–12 mm long. The androecium consists of 6 stamens. The gynoecium consists of 3 carpels. The oblong-elliptic seeds are 1.2–1.5 mm wide, and 2–3 mm long.

=== Cytology ===
The chromosome count is 2n = 39, c. 78.

== Taxonomy ==
It was described by Marian Ørgaard in 1991. The type specimen was collected by L.Z. Adhumada, A. Shinini, and S.G. Tressens in Corrientes, Argentina. One source treats it as a synonym of Cabomba caroliniana, but it is accepted by other sources.

=== Etymology ===
The varietal name flavida from the Latin flavum means yellow.

== Distribution and habitat ==
It occurs in Paraguay (Central, San Pedro), Argentina (Corrientes, Santa Fe), and Brazil (Paraná, Rio Grande do Sul, Santa Catarina).

== Conservation ==
It is endangered.

== Cultivation ==
It may find use as an aquarium plant. Cabomba caroliniana var. flavida has been found in cultivation under the name Cabomba australis. It shows less vigorous or invasive growth than Cabomba caroliniana var. caroliniana.
