= Cabomba grandis =

Cabomba grandis Temporal range: Paleocene

Scientific classification
- Kingdom: Plantae
- Clade: Tracheophytes
- Clade: Angiosperms
- Order: Nymphaeales
- Family: Cabombaceae
- Genus: Cabomba
- Species: †C. grandis

Binomial name
- †Cabomba grandis Newb.

Fossil species of aquatic plant

Cabomba grandis is a fossil species of aquatic plant in the family Cabombaceae.

== Description ==
The cylindrical, smooth stems bear opposite, finely divided, dichotomously forked leaves.

== Taxonomy ==
It was published by John Strong Newberry in 1883.

=== Etymology ===
The specific epithet grandis means big or large. Compared to Cabomba gracilis, which was found in the same locality, it is significantly larger.
