= Cabomba schwartzii =

Scientific classification
- Kingdom: Plantae
- Clade: Tracheophytes
- Clade: Angiosperms
- Order: Nymphaeales
- Family: Cabombaceae
- Genus: Cabomba
- Species: C. schwartzii

Binomial name
- Cabomba schwartzii Rataj
- Cabomba schwartzii is endemic to North Brazil

Species of aquatic plant

Cabomba schwartzii is a species of aquatic plant in the family Cabombaceae endemic to North Brazil.

== Description ==
=== Vegetative characteristics ===
Cabomba schwartzii is an aquatic herb. The length of the stems depends on the water level. The stems have two vascular bundles. The elliptical or orbicular, peltate, petiolate floating leaves are 1.5—3.8 cm long, and 1.0—2.5 cm wide. The adaxial leaf surface is purple. The petiole is 1—3 cm long.

=== Generative characteristics ===
The yellow flowers emerge above the water surface. The 2-3 sepals are 6.0–8.0 mm long, and 2.5–3.0 mm wide. The 2-3 petals are 6.5–8.0 mm long, and 2.5–3.0 mm wide. The androecium consists of 2, 3, 4, 5, or 6 stamens. The gynoecium consists of 1, or 2 carpels. The seeds are 1.5–2.2 mm long, and 1–1.2 mm wide.

== Taxonomy ==
Cabomba schwartzii Rataj was published by Karel Rataj in 1977. It was then treated as a synonym of Cabomba aquatica Aubl. by Marian Ørgaard in 1991. It was reestablished by Barbosa et al. in 2018. The type specimen was collected by T. W. Schwartz in Igarapé do Aduja, Rio Itu, Rio Negro, Brazil.

== Ecology ==
=== Habitat ===
It occurs sympatrically with Cabomba furcata, Nymphaea, Utricularia, and Mayaca.

=== Pollination ===
Flies and bees visit the flowers of Cabomba schwartzii.
