= Hickory Hills Lake (Lunenburg, Massachusetts) =

- Dickinson Reservoir
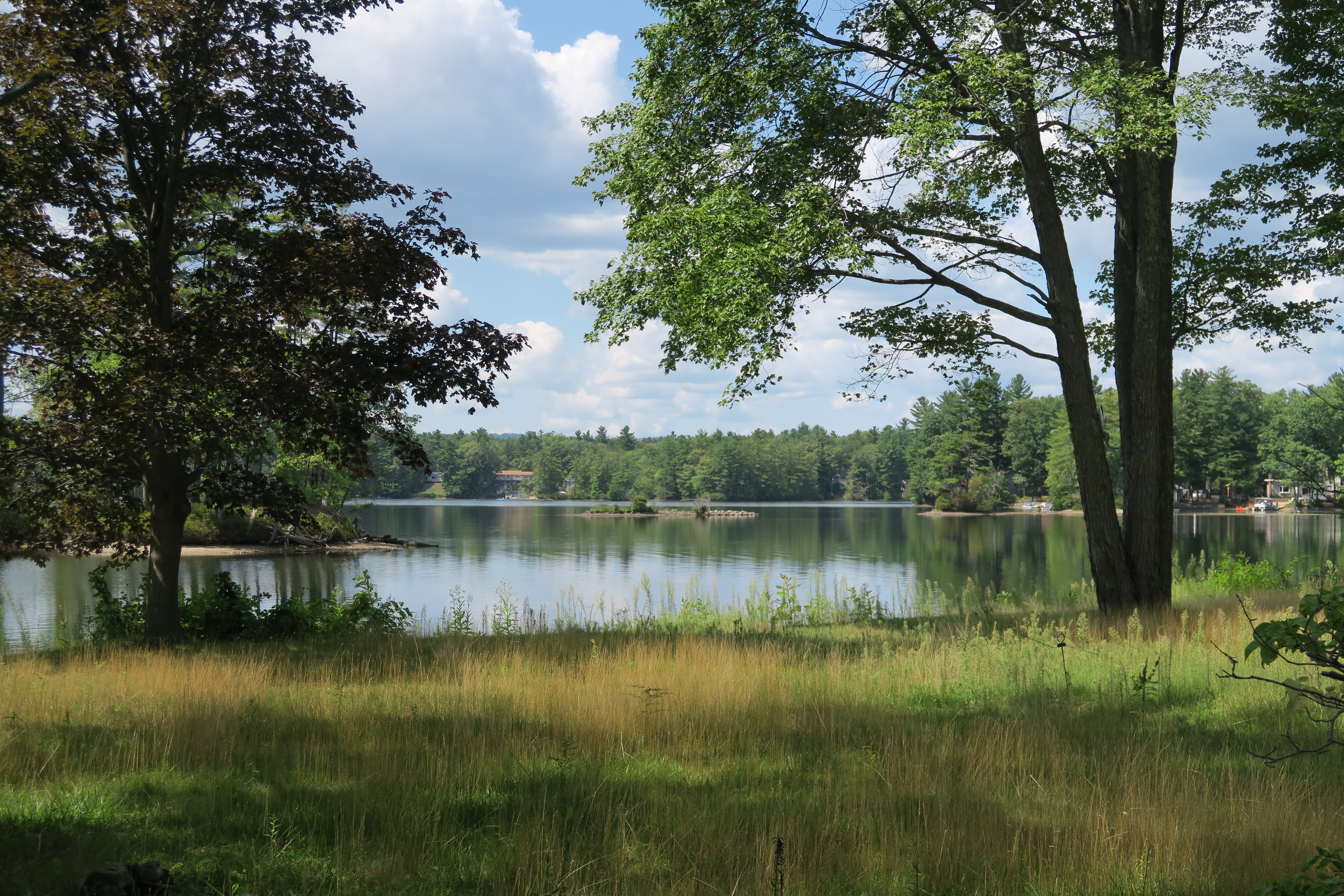

- Location within Massachusetts Location within the United States
- Location: Worcester County, Massachusetts, U.S.
- Coordinates: 42°36′40″N 71°42′25″W
- Type: Reservoir
- Basin countries: United States
- Surface area: 319 acres (129 ha)
- Average depth: 12 ft (3.7 m)
- Max. depth: 20 ft (6.1 m)
- Surface elevation: 367 ft (112 m)
- Dam: Hickory Hills Lake Dam
- Islands: several
- Settlements: Lunenburg

Hickory Hills Lake is the largest private lake in Massachusetts, located in the town of Lunenburg in Worcester County.

== History ==
Prior to 1925, Hickory Hills Lake was just a swampy area along Mulpus Brook. Charles P. Dickinson owned the land and prepared to turn the area into his own private lake. In the summer of 1925 he had all of the trees cleared so that the area could be constructed into an earthen dike. By 1926 the dike began to fill with water, creating the Dickinson Reservoir.

Dickinson died in 1935 leaving the lake to his son Arnold Dickinson. He went on to sell the lake and much of the surrounding property to the Hickory Hills Lake Corporation which consisted of a small group of incorporators. Al Bowron was among the incorporators and took the initiative in building the lake community by draining the lake and building new roads on the property.

After Al Bowron's death in 1971, his son Scott followed in his father's footsteps by taking over management of the lake community. The community had struggled and needed much attention to bring it back to its original condition. Despite great efforts, Scott found it difficult to expedite maintenance of Hickory Hills' community and went on to put the lake up for sale in 1978. This drove a group of residents to join together and form the Hickory Hills Landowners, Inc. They went ahead to buy all of Hickory Hills Lake and the community surrounding it. From here on out the residents of the Hickory Hills were to band together and hold responsibility over their own community.

== Lake ==
The lake is 319 acres (129 ha) in area with an average depth of 12 feet (3.7 m) and a maximum depth of 20 feet (6.1 m). It is owned by Hickory Hills Landowners, Inc. who own the three beaches and surrounding property. The three beaches are for public use of any residents of the HHLI. There are many different species of fish, including largemouth bass, smallmouth bass, chain pickerel, yellow perch, brown bullhead, golden shiner, sunfish, and bluegill.

== Boating ==
There is a boat docking area permitted for use by any of residents who do not own lakefront property by issue of boat stickers and identification cards. The boats permitted for use on the lake are: kayaks, canoes, sailboats, electric motored boats, and power boats. There are horsepower and speed restrictions for motored boats of no more than 8HP and a limit of 9.9HP for pontoon boats. Jet Skis and water skiing are not permitted. Hickory Hills has an annual boat parade on July 4th.

== Issues ==
In January 2009 the Board of Directors approved the formation of a Lake Management group to evaluate every aspect of the lake's environment and identify any issues that could affect the quality and health of the lake. As of 2012 the group has identified a handful of problems including erosion problems along the shorelines and many of the islands. Most recently, an invasive weed species of Fanwort has been detected in two locations of the main lake.
