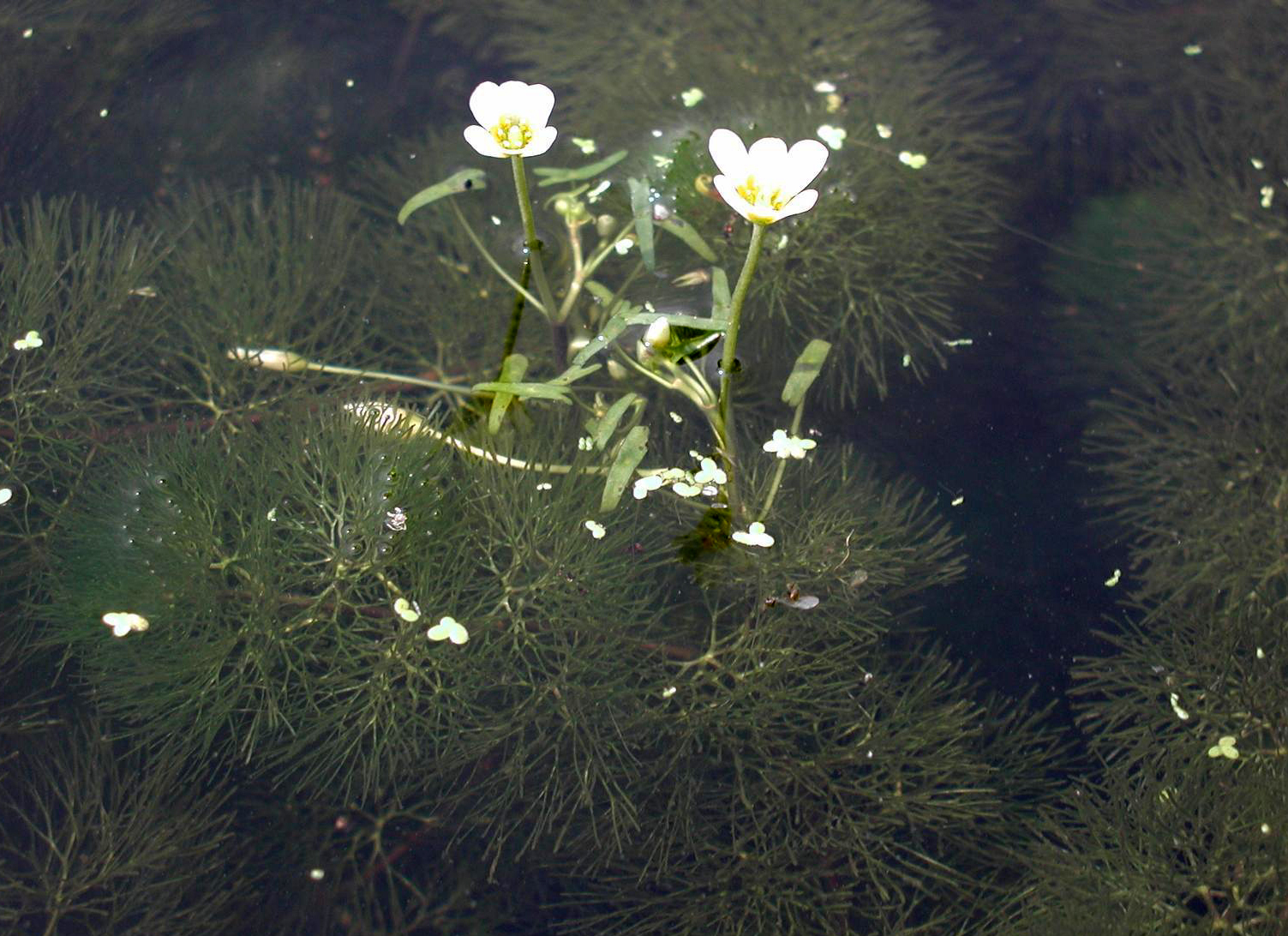

Scientific classification
- Kingdom: Plantae
- Clade: Tracheophytes
- Clade: Angiosperms
- Order: Nymphaeales
- Family: Cabombaceae
- Genus: Cabomba
- Species: C. caroliniana A.Gray
- Variety: C. c. var. caroliniana

Trinomial name
- Cabomba caroliniana var. caroliniana

Synonyms
- Cabomba australis Speg.; Cabomba caroliniana var. paucipartita Ramsh. & Florsch.

= Cabomba caroliniana var. caroliniana =

Species of aquatic plant

Cabomba caroliniana var. caroliniana is a variety of the species Cabomba caroliniana in the family Cabombaceae native to the regions spanning from central and eastern USA to northeast Mexico, and Brazil to Central Argentina.

== Description ==
=== Vegetative characteristics ===
Cabomba caroliniana var. caroliniana is an aquatic, perennial herb with green to reddish brown, branched, up to 10 m long, and 1–2 mm wide stems. The petiolate, fan-shaped, dichotomously or trichotomously divided submerged leaves with slim, linear lamina segments are 6–7 cm wide. The relatively few, narrowly elliptic, peltate, green floating leaves are 5–20 mm long, and 1–3 mm wide. Floating leaves may be absent entirely.

=== Generative characteristics ===
The solitary, pedicellate, white, 6–15 mm wide flowers float on the water surface, or extend 2–4 cm above it. The flowers have three white or cream, obovate to elliptic, 5–12 mm long, and 2–7 mm wide sepals. The three white or cream, elliptic-obovate petals are 4–12 mm long, and 2–5 mm wide. The androecium consists of 6 stamens with 4 mm long filaments. The gynoecium consists of 2–4 carpels. The fruit with a recurved pedicel bears ellipsoid-oblong to ovate, 1.5–3 mm long, and 1–1.5 mm wide seeds.

=== Cytology ===
The chromosome count is 2n = ca. 78, ca. 104.

== Taxonomy ==
It is an autonym. Some sources regard the variety Cabomba caroliniana var. pulcherrima as synonymous to Cabomba caroliniana var. caroliniana.

=== Etymology ===
The varietal name caroliniana means from the Carolinas.

== Distribution and habitat ==
It is native to Argentina, Bolivia, Brazil, Mexico, Paraguay, Uruguay, and the USA. It has been introduced to Australia, Austria, China, Germany, India, Japan, Korea, Malaysia, the Netherlands, New Caledonia, New Zealand, Poland, Romania, Serbia, Sri Lanka, Sweden, Thailand, and the UK.

== Ecology ==
The flowers are insect-pollinated.

== Cultivation ==
It is cultivated as an ornamental plant in aquaria and in ponds.
