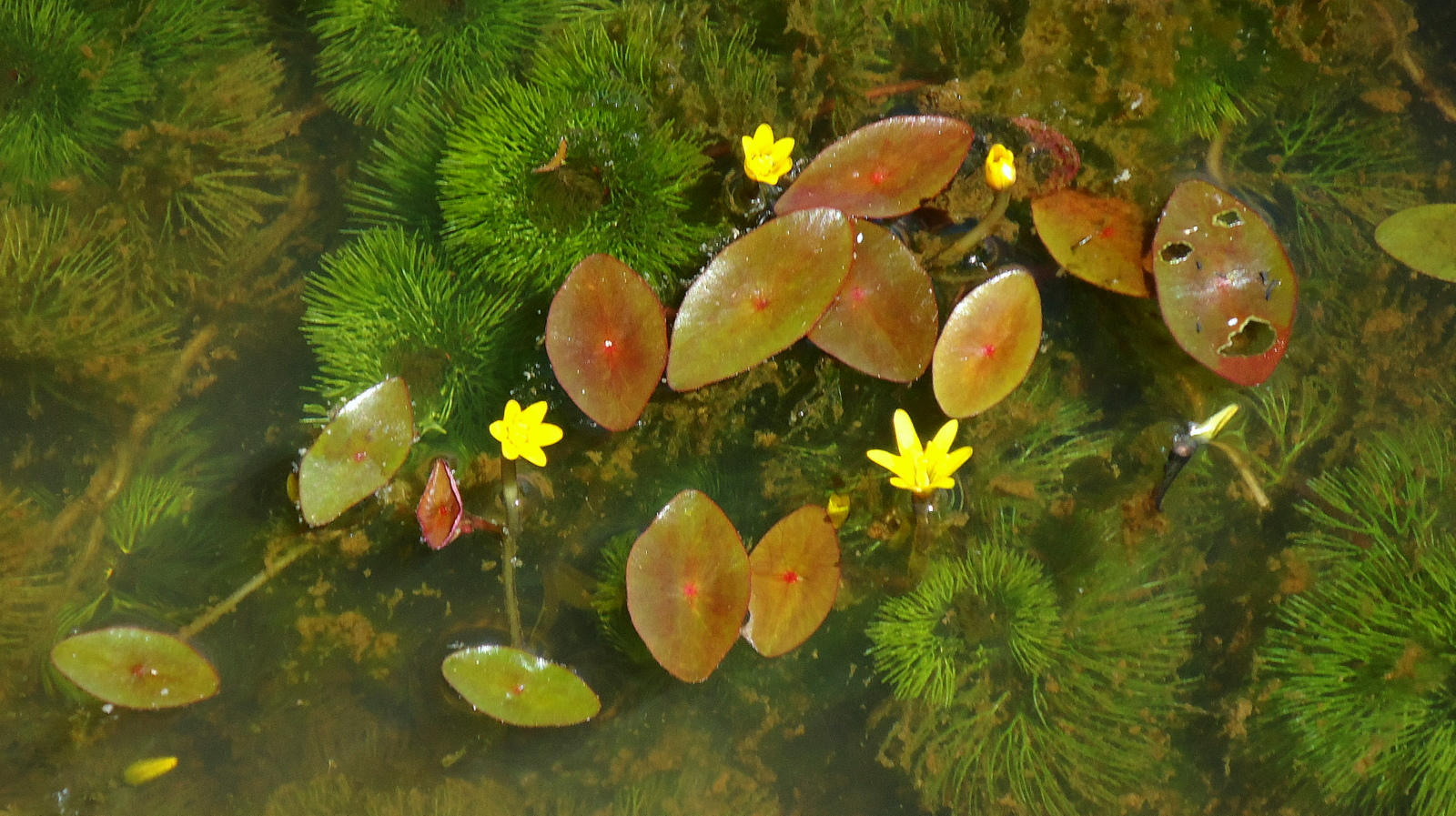

Scientific classification
- Kingdom: Plantae
- Clade: Tracheophytes
- Clade: Angiosperms
- Order: Nymphaeales
- Family: Cabombaceae
- Genus: Cabomba
- Species: C. aquatica

Binomial name
- Cabomba aquatica Aubl.

Synonyms
- List: Cabomba aubletii Michx.; Nectris aquatica (Aubl.) J.F.Gmel.; Nectris peltata Pursh

= Cabomba aquatica =

Species of aquatic plant

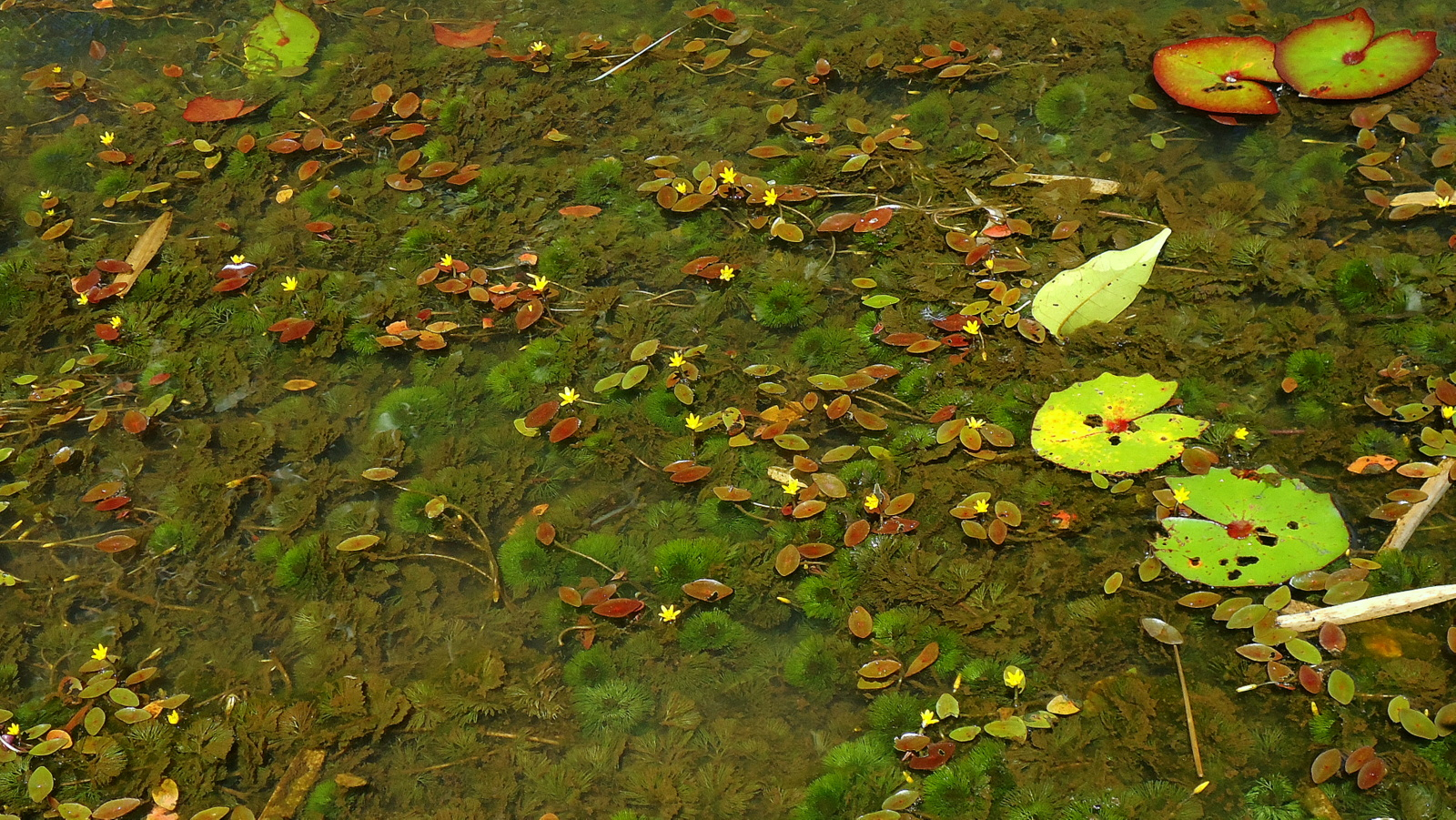
Cabomba aquatica growing sympatrically with Nymphaea rudgeana

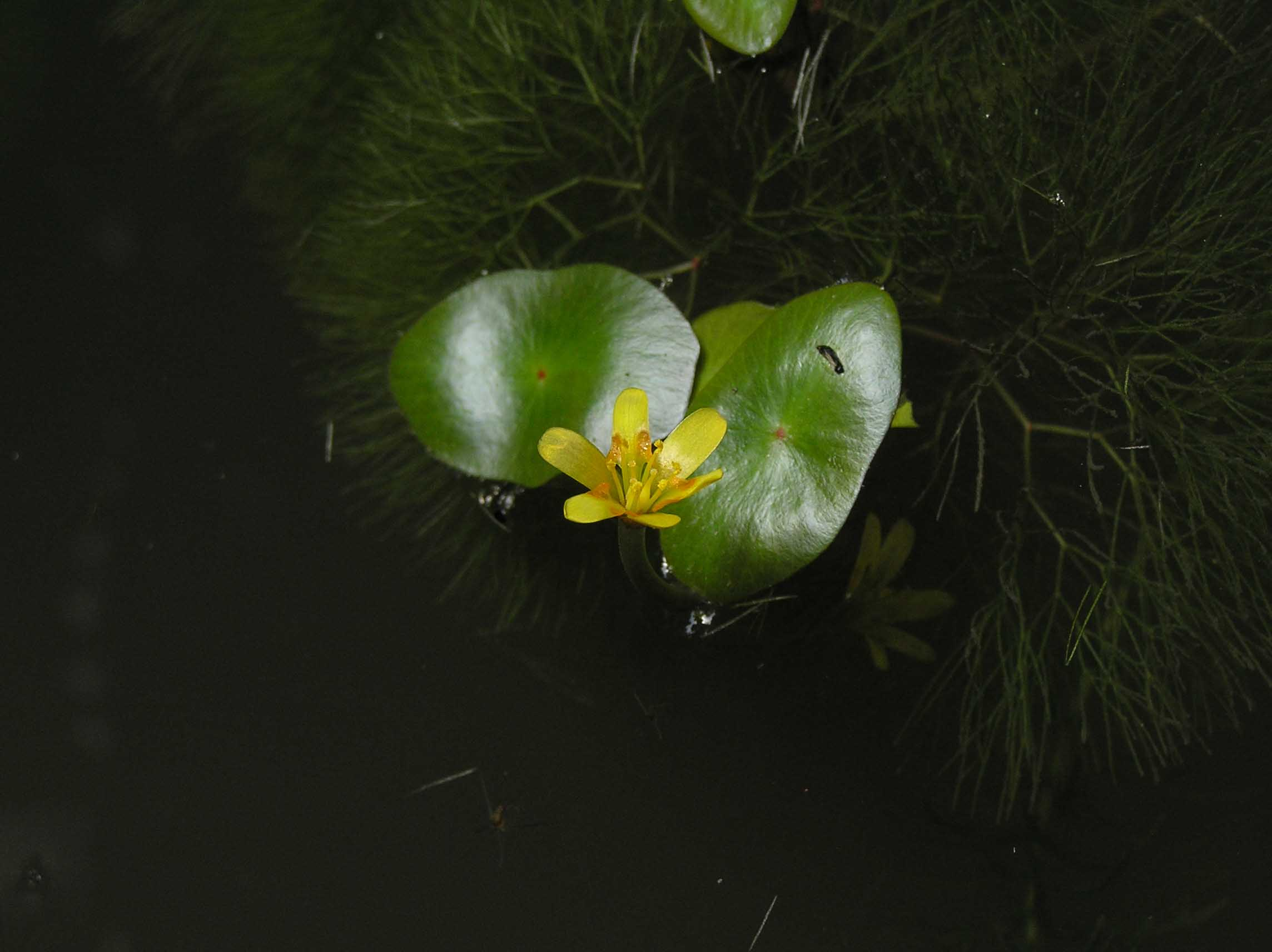
Detail of peltate floating leaves and flower

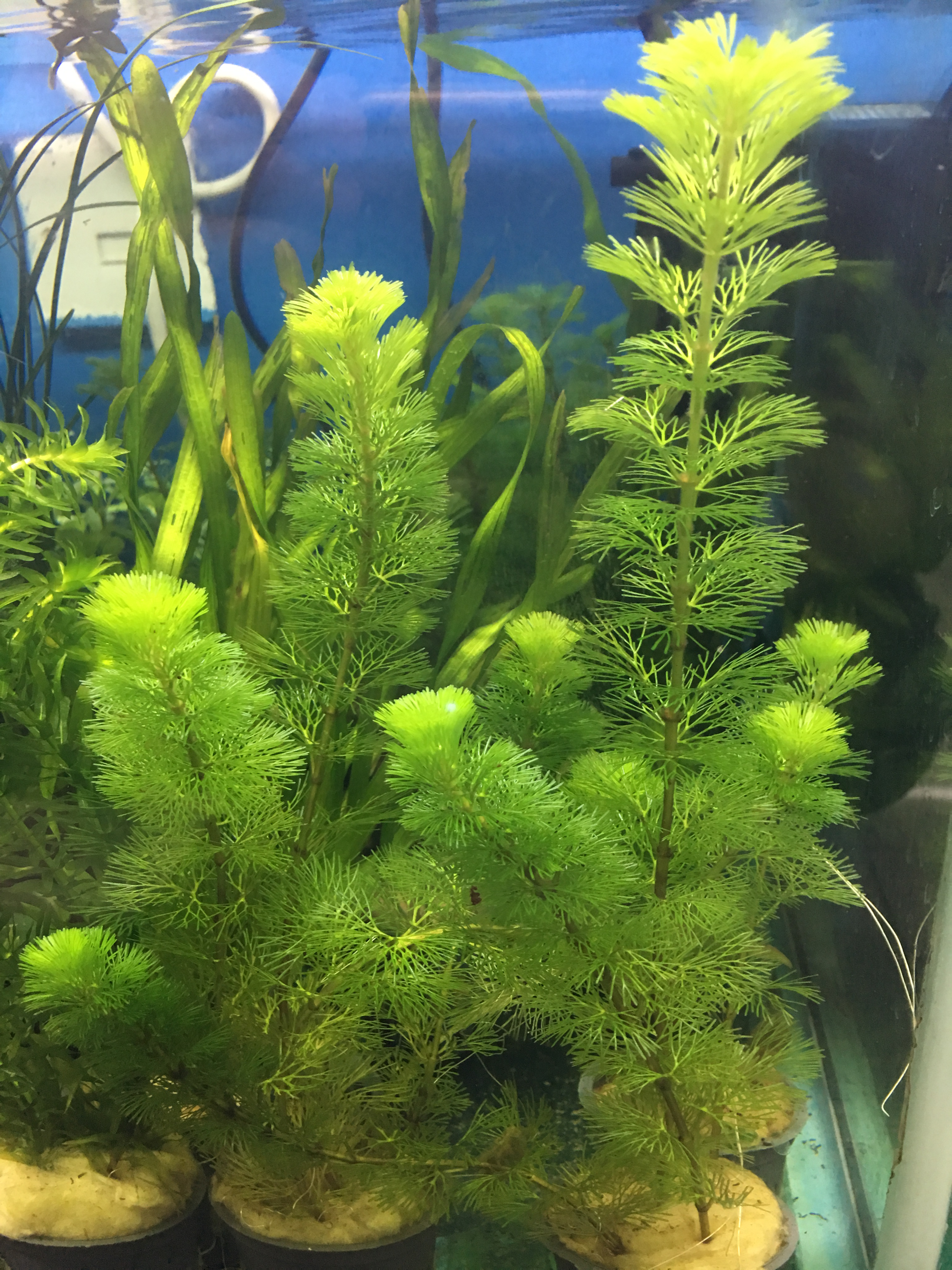
In an aquarium

Cabomba aquatica is a rhizomatous, perennial, aquatic herb in the family Cabombaceae native to South America. It occurs in fresh standing water or in lakes and rivers with slight currents.

== Description ==
=== Vegetative characteristics ===
Cabomba aquatica is a rhizomatous, perennial, aquatic herb with green to red, up to 1.5 m long stems. Both submerged and floating leaves are produced. The finely divided, reniform, 4–5 cm long, and 6 cm wide submerged leaves are trichotomously branched. The orbicular to broadly elliptic floating leaves, which are produced towards the apex of the shoot, with an entire margin are 5–20 mm long, and 4–15 mm wide. The petiole is 9.0–55.0 mm long.

=== Generative characteristics ===
The golden yellow, solitary, bisexual, diurnal, incompletely protogynous, nectariferous, 0.5–1.1 cm wide flower extends beyond the water surface. It has 3(–4) 3.7–3.8 mm long, and 1.4–2.1 mm wide sepals. The androecium consists of (3–)6 bright yellow stamens with 2.5–4 mm long filaments. The very large, elongate, monosulcate pollen grains are 71.8–88.3 μm long, and 38.9–48.4 μm wide. The gynoecium consists of 2–3(–4) carpels. Each fruit bears a single oval, black, 2–3.5 mm long, and 1.5–2.5 mm wide seed. The fruit develops underwater.

=== Cytology ===
The chromosome count is 2n = 52. The chloroplast genome of Cabomba aquatica is 159487 bp long.

== Taxonomy ==
It was published by Jean Baptiste Christophore Fusée Aublet in 1775. It is the type species of its genus.

=== Etymology ===
The specific epithet aquatica means growing in or near water.

=== Relationship with Cabomba schwartzii ===
The controversial species Cabomba schwartzii is often included in Cabomba aquatica, but it may represent a separate species. Cabomba schwartzii reportedly differs from Cabomba aquatica in the number of floral organs, yet this may be attributed to intraspecific variation.

== Distribution ==
It is native to the North of South America, namely Bolivia, Brazil, Colombia, French Guiana, Guyana, Peru, Suriname, and Venezuela. It has been introduced to Bangladesh and Malaysia.

== Ecology ==
=== Pollination ===
The flowers are pollinated by bees, wasps, and flies.

=== Habitat ===
It occurs in stagnant or flowing water in ponds, floodplains, lakes, creeks, and swamps in bright light conditions.

== Use ==
=== Aquarium ===
It is used as an aquarium plant, but it is difficult to cultivate. It requires a high light intensity, soft, slightly acidic water, and temperatures of 18–26 °C. Algae can be a challenge in cultivation by covering submerged leaves and damaging the plant. Likewise, it may be harmed by fish in the aquarium, or too strong water currents.

=== Model organism ===
It has been explored to use Cabomba aquatica as a potential model organism for studies of early angiosperm evolution.
