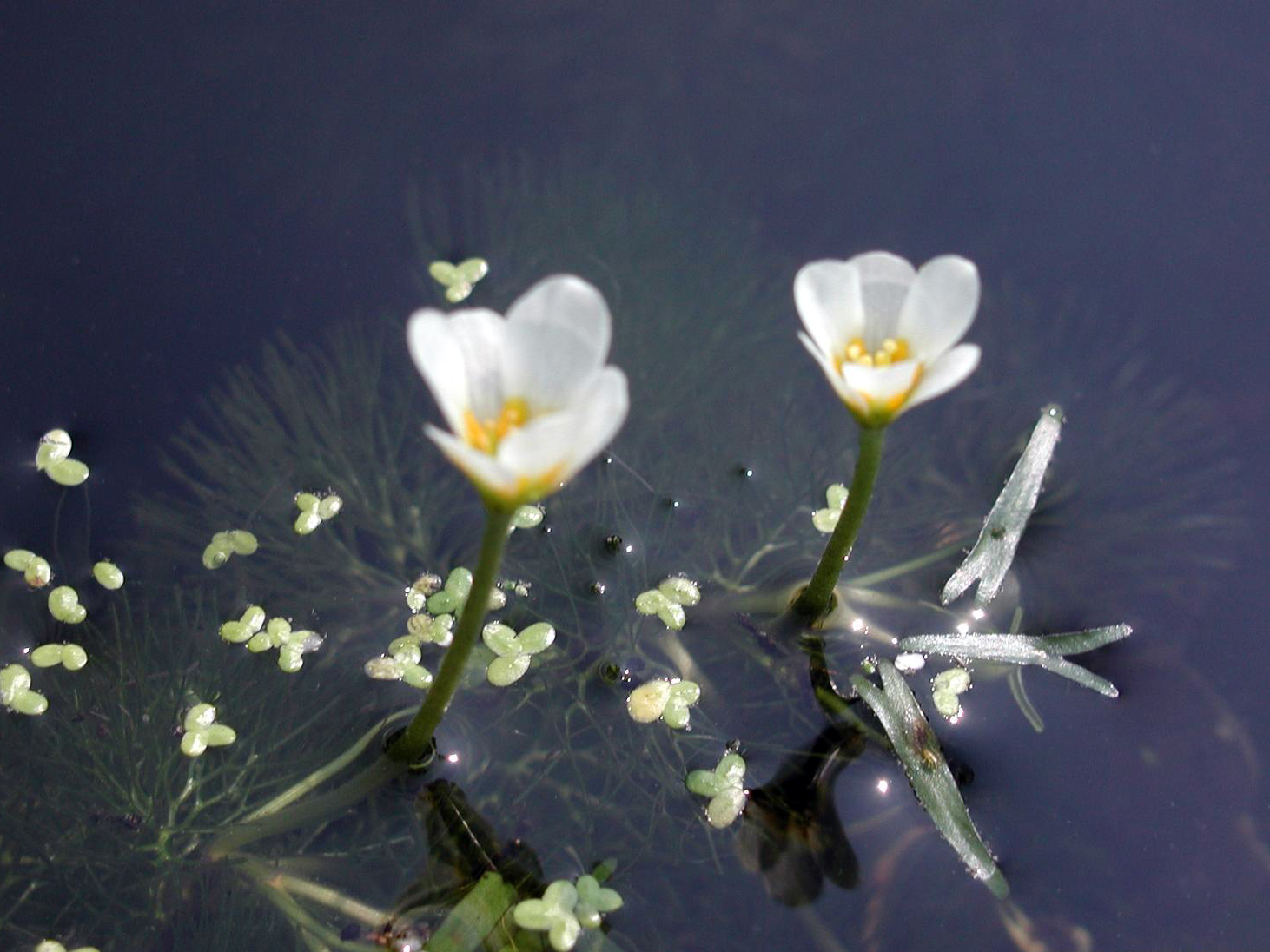
- The flowers and floating leaves
- Secure (NatureServe)

Scientific classification
- Kingdom: Plantae
- Clade: Tracheophytes
- Clade: Angiosperms
- Order: Nymphaeales
- Family: Cabombaceae
- Genus: Cabomba
- Species: C. caroliniana

Binomial name
- Cabomba caroliniana A.Gray

Varieties
- See here

Synonyms
- Nectris caroliniana (A.Gray) Steud.

= Cabomba caroliniana =

Species of aquatic plant

Cabomba caroliniana, commonly known as Carolina fanwort, is a rhizomatous, aquatic, perennial herb native to North and South America. Having been a popular aquarium plant, it has been exported around the world and has become an invasive species in Europe and Australia.

== Description ==
Cabomba caroliniana is a rhizomatous, perennial, aquatic herb. The stems are green, up to 1.5 metres (5 ft) long, and 1–2 millimetres (1/32–3/32 in) wide. The floating leaves are 0.6–3 centimetres (1/4–1 1/4 in) long and 1–4 mm wide.

The flower is 0.6–1.5 cm wide and floats on the water surface or extends beyond it. The sepals are white, 5–12 mm (1/4–1/2 in) long and 2–7 mm wide while the petals are white, 4–12 mm long and 2–5 mm wide. The androecium consists of (3–4–)6 stamens. The gynoecium consists of 2–3 carpels. The fruit is 8–8.7 mm long, 2.1–2.3 mm wide, and bears ovoid to oblong seeds, which are 1.5–3 mm long and 1–2.2 mm wide.

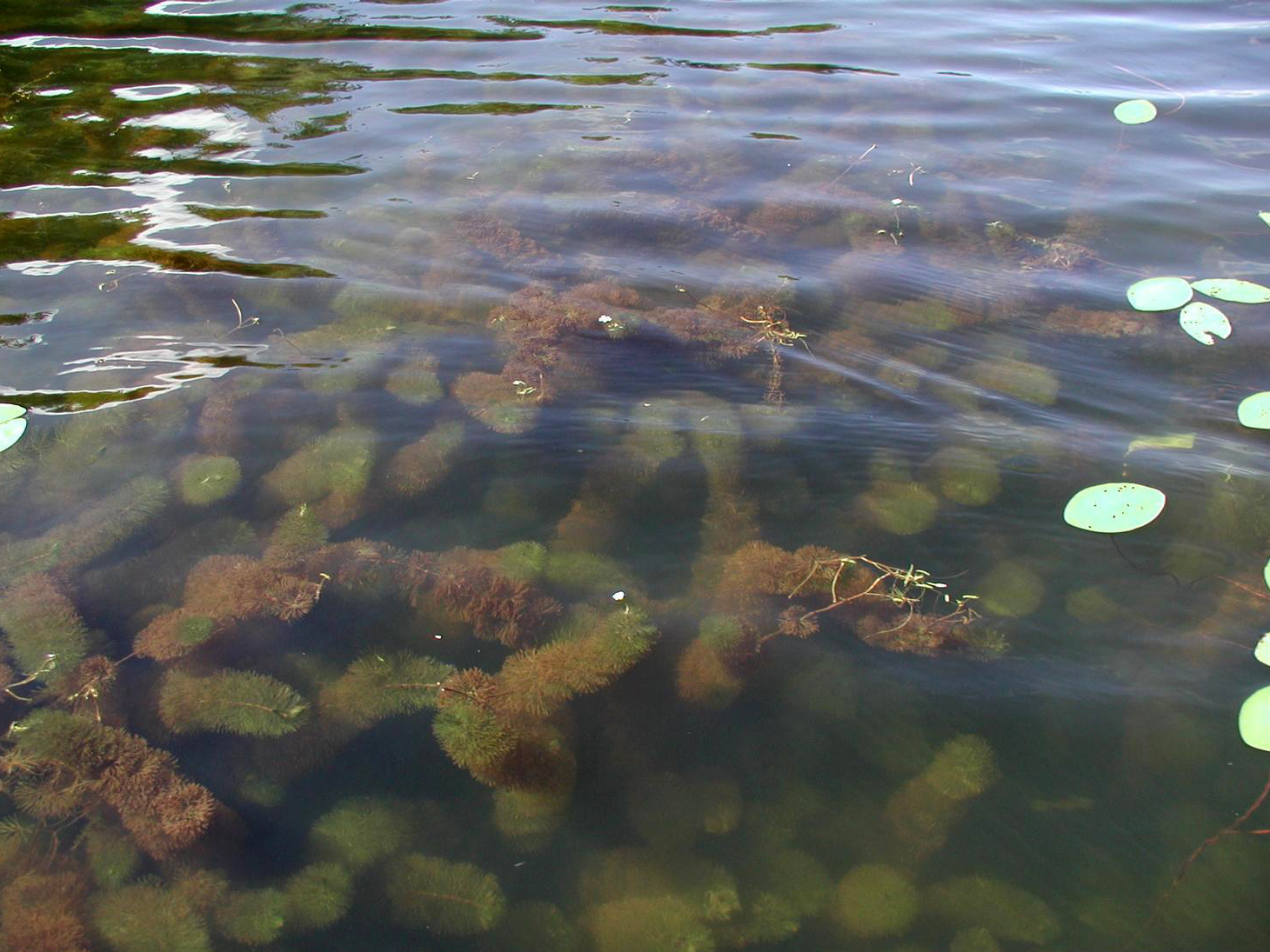
Submerged green and reddish-brown shoots

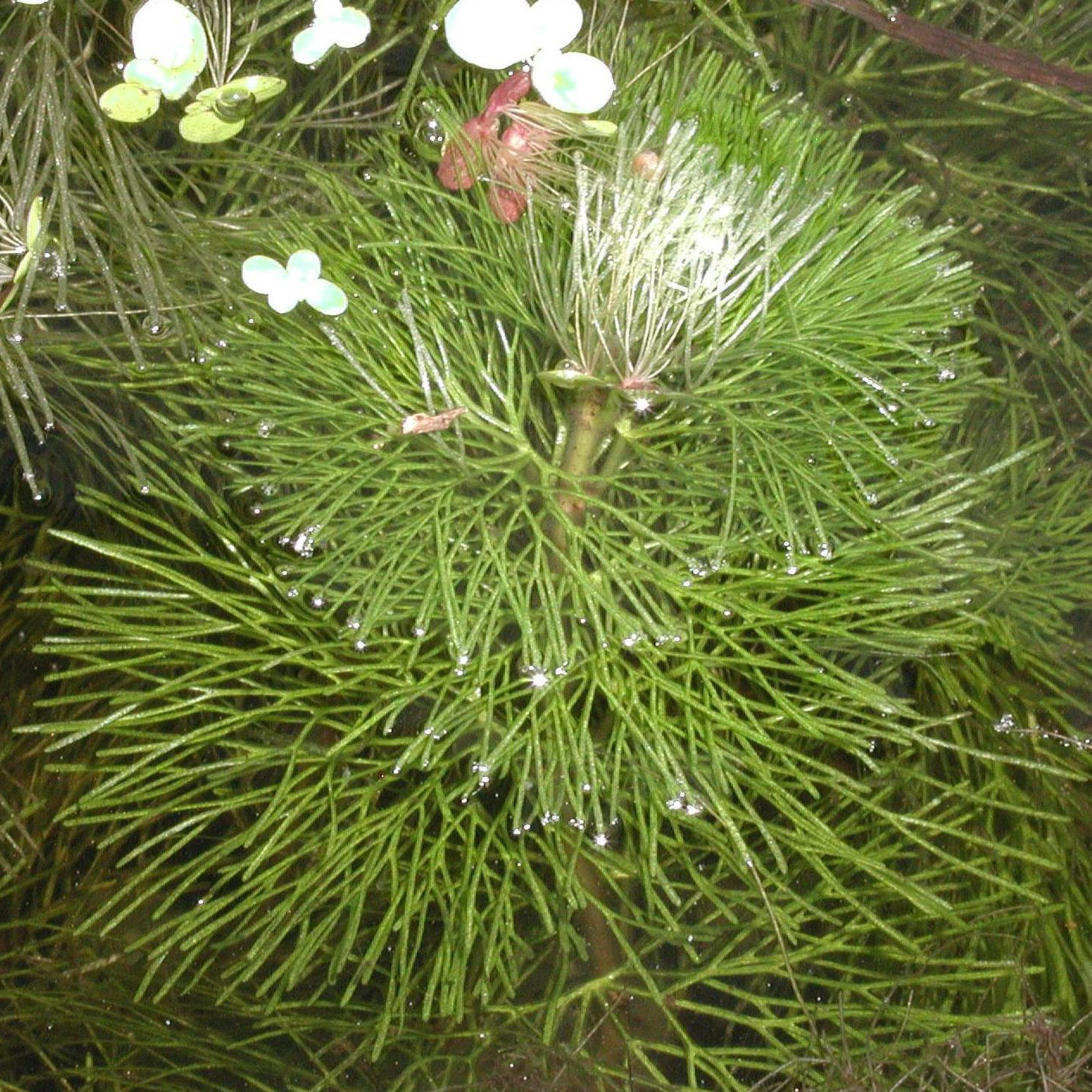
Leaves protruding above the surface

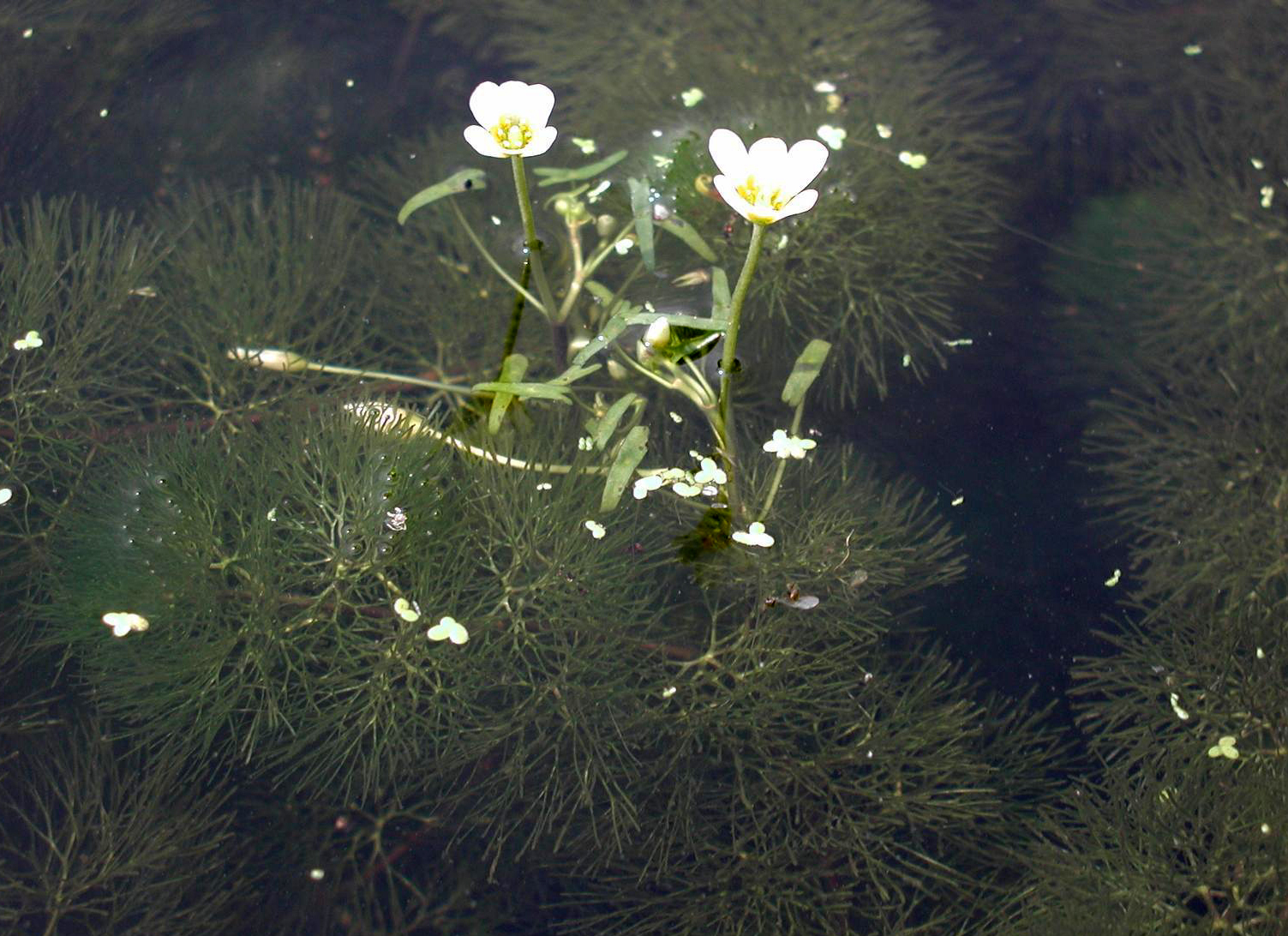
Submerged leaves and protruding flowers

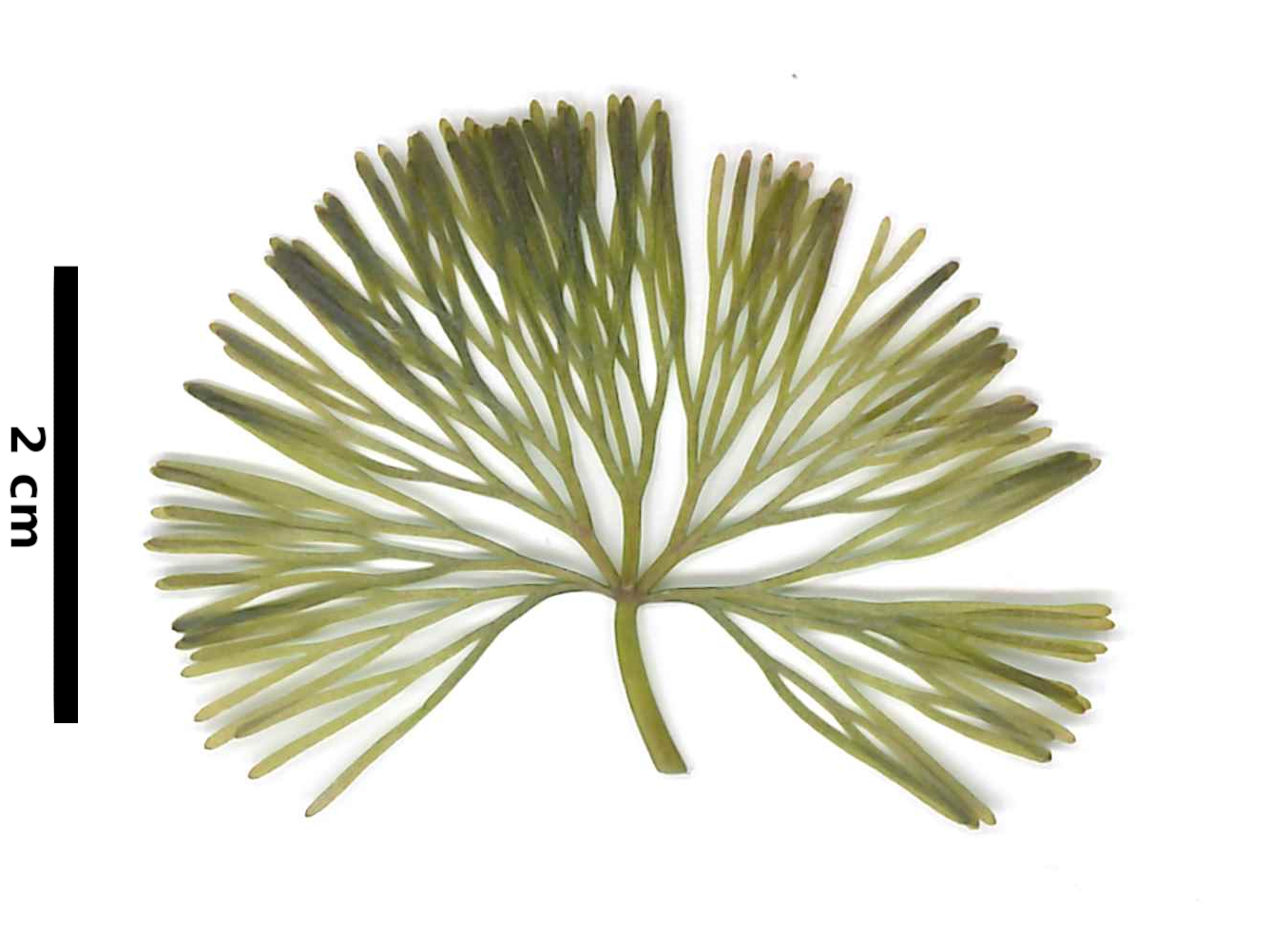
Leaf with scale bar

=== Cytology ===
The chromosome count is 2n = 26, 78, 104. The chloroplast genome is 164057 bp or 160177 bp long.

=== Similar species ===
Limnophila sessiliflora is similar but has whirls of three or more leaves instead of opposite pairs.

== Taxonomy ==
The species was first described by Asa Gray in 1837.

=== Varieties ===
It has three varieties:

- Cabomba caroliniana var. caroliniana
- Cabomba caroliniana var. flavida Morgaard
- Cabomba caroliniana var. pulcherrima R.M.Harper

== Common names ==
Cabomba caroliniana is commonly called Carolina fanwort, Carolina water shield, green cabomba, fanwort, fish grass, Washington grass, Washington plant, common cabomba, Washington plant, and watershield.

== Distribution ==
The species is native to southeastern South America (southern Brazil, Paraguay, Uruguay, and northeastern Argentina), and the East and West Coasts of the United States. Outside of its natural range, it has been introduced to China, Austria, Germany, Great Britain, India, Japan, Korea, Malaysia, Netherlands, New Caledonia, New Zealand, Poland, Romania, Sri Lanka, Sweden, and Thailand.

== Ecology ==
Large numbers of plants are sent from Florida to the rest of the U.S. for commercial use. Fanwort is also grown commercially in Asia for export to Europe and other parts of the world. Small-scale, local cultivation occurs in some areas, and aquarists are probably responsible for some introductions.

This species grows rooted in the mud of stagnant to slow-flowing water, including streams, smaller rivers, lakes, ponds, sloughs, and ditches. In some states in the U.S., it is now regarded as a weed. Fanwort stems become brittle in late summer, which causes the plant to break apart, facilitating its distribution and invasion of new water bodies. It produces by seed, but vegetative reproduction seems to be its main vehicle for spreading to new waters. Growth of 50 mm (2 in) a day has been reported in Lake Macdonald in Queensland, Australia.

Use in the aquarium trade has led to some species being introduced to other parts of the world, such as Australia, where Cabomba caroliniana it is a nationally declared weed. Having arrived in 1967, it spread rapidly in waterways and out-competed native plants, threatening water supplies, especially along the eastern side of the continent. It is a weed of national significance in Australia.

It is also on the list of invasive alien species of concern in the European Union. The latter implies that the species cannot be traded nor commercialised. The EU forbids trading and selling of the plant and requires people possessing it before the regulation went into force to take appropriate measures to prevent it from spreading.

=== Control measures ===
As of July 2023 a trial is under way to control the weed by introducing a tiny South American beetle, Hydrotimetes natans, or Cabomba weevil, into Lake Macdonald and Lake Kurwongbah in Queensland. The species is being bred in a nursery at Kurwongbah, with a view to national introduction for biological control of the weed. The larvae of the weevil damage the plant by tunnelling through its stems, breaking them down and causing fungal infections which hinder their ability to reproduce. It has been found that only the insect mostly feeds on Cabomba, and does not affect any native plants.

== Conservation ==
The NatureServe conservation status is G5 Secure.
