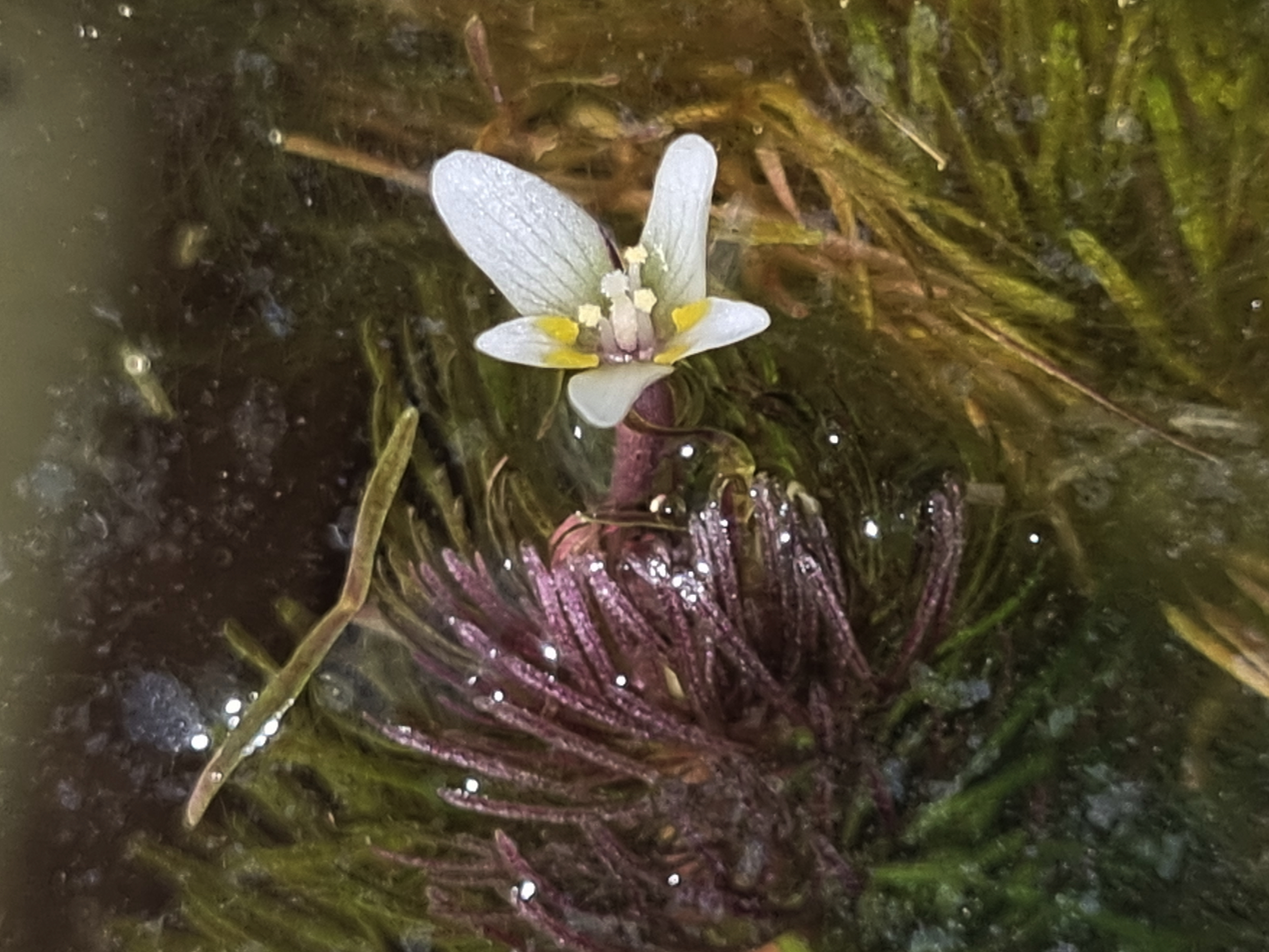
- Flowering Cabomba palaeformis with submerged leaves and one floating leaf

Scientific classification
- Kingdom: Plantae
- Clade: Tracheophytes
- Clade: Angiosperms
- Order: Nymphaeales
- Family: Cabombaceae
- Genus: Cabomba
- Species: C. palaeformis

Binomial name
- Cabomba palaeformis Fassett

= Cabomba palaeformis =

Species of aquatic plant

Cabomba palaeformis is a species of aquatic plant in the family Cabombaceae native to Mexico and Central America.

== Description ==
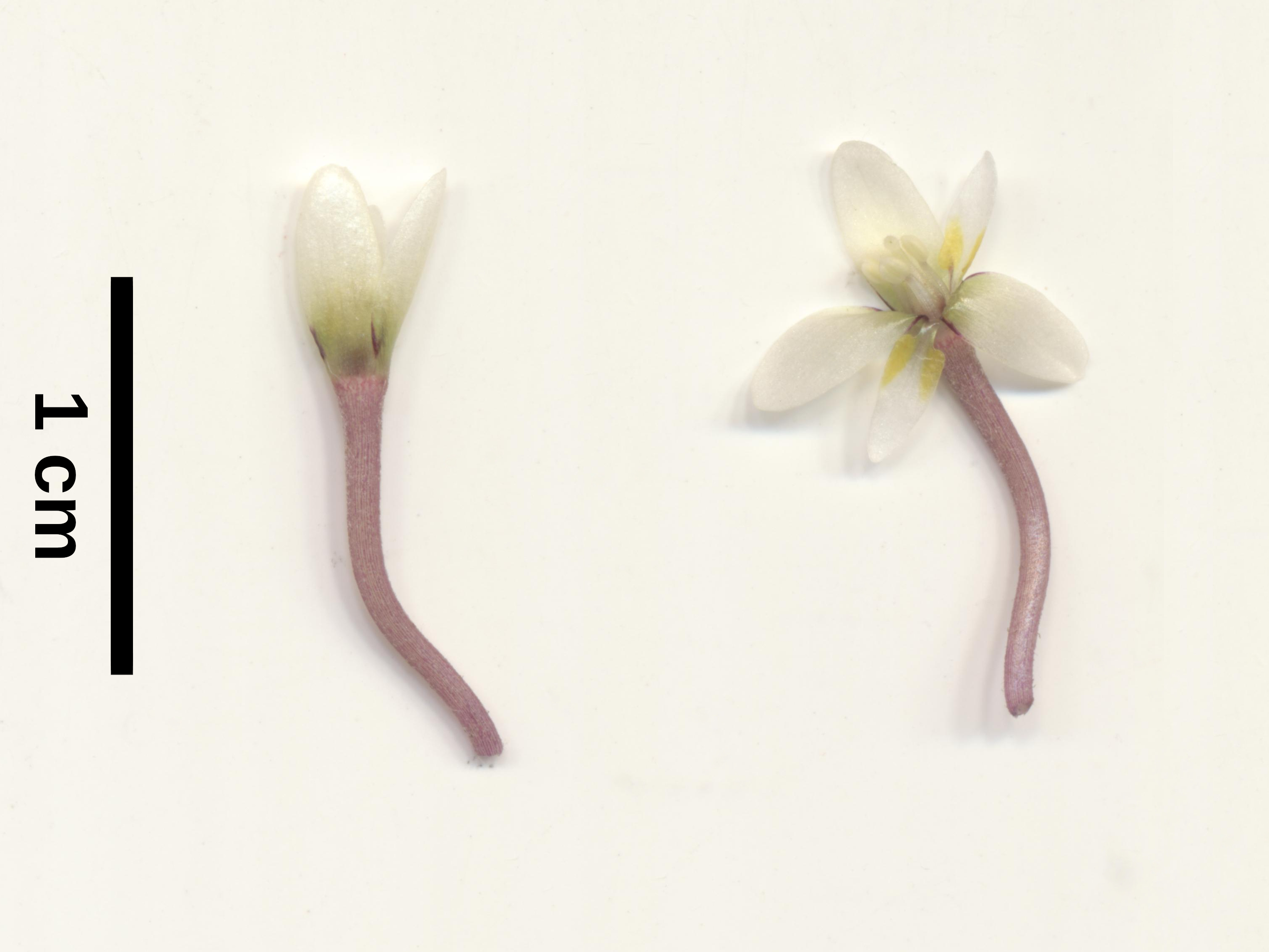
Cabomba palaeformis flower with scale bar (1 cm)

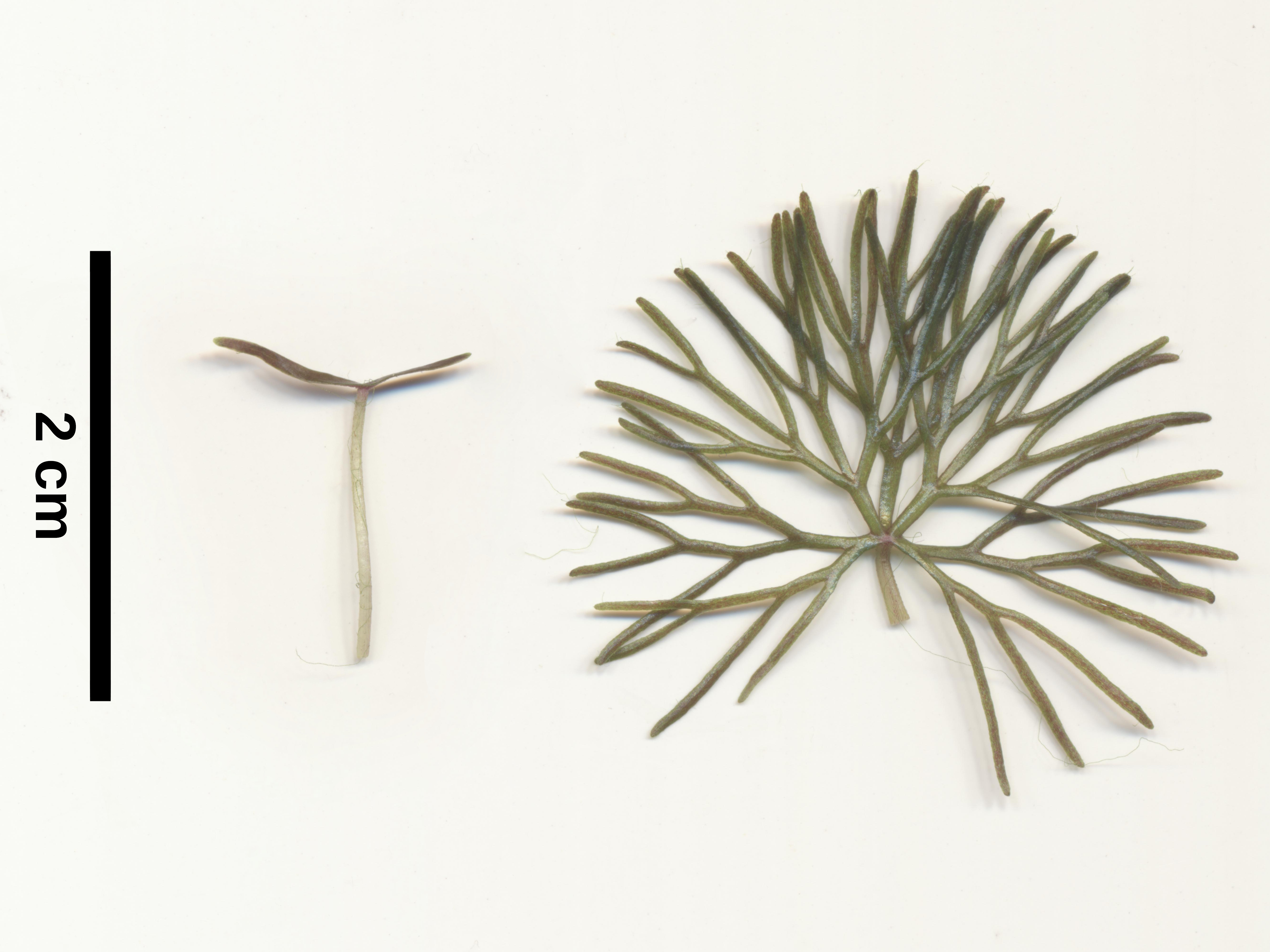
Floating (left) and submerged (right) leaves of Cabomba palaeformis with scale bar (2 cm)

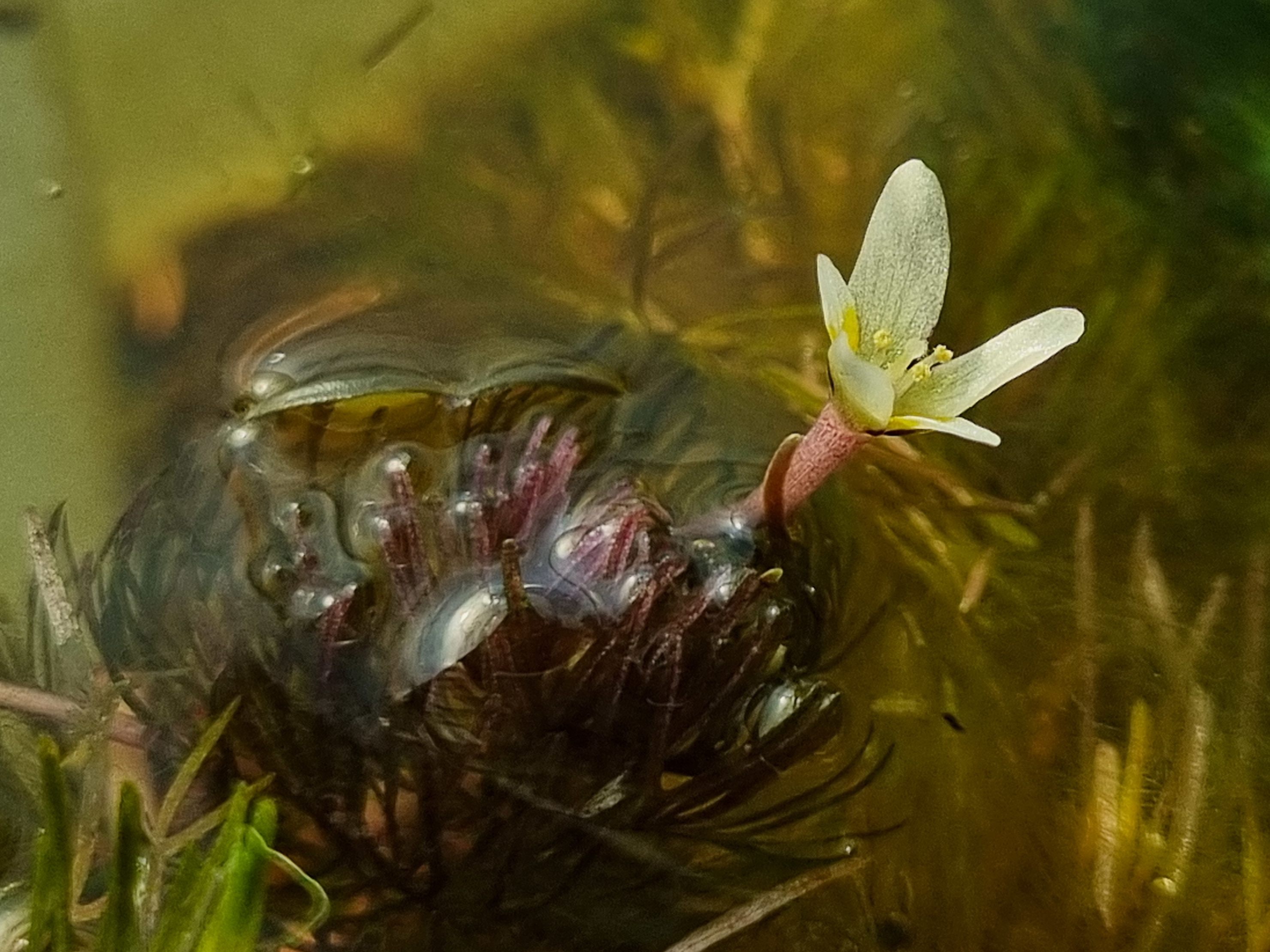
Flowering Cabomba palaeformis with submerged leaves and one floating leaf

=== Vegetative characteristics ===
Cabomba palaeformis is an aquatic herb. The divided submerged leaves display purple spotting and red striations. The linear floating leaves are 11 mm long, and 1.4 mm wide.

=== Generative characteristics ===
The 6-8 mm long flowers are white with occasional yellow or purple colouration at the petal base. The pollen grains have striate and perforate ornamentations. The gynoecium consists of a single carpel.

=== Cytology ===
The chromosome count is 2n = 26.

== Taxonomy ==
Cabomba palaeformis Fassett was first published by Norman Carter Fassett in 1953. The type specimen was collected in Tampico, Mexico by Palmer in April 1910.

== Ecology ==
=== Habitat ===
It occurs in shallow lakes, canals, and freshwater lagoons. It provides shelter to aquatic invertebrates and fish.

== As an aquarium plant ==
It is rarely cultivated, yet grows easily under bright conditions in hard water. It tolerates various conditions in cultivation.
