= John Walter Thomson =

Scottish-born American botanist and lichenologist (1913–2009)

- Born: July 9, 1913; Cockenzie, Scotland
- Died: February 20, 2009 (aged 95); Mount Horeb, Wisconsin
- Education: Columbia University; University of Wisconsin
- Scientific career
- Fields: Botany
- Workplaces: University of Wisconsin
- Thesis: Relic Prairie Areas in Central Wisconsin
- Doctoral advisor: Norman C. Fassett
- Doctoral students: William P. Jordan; Bill Culberson; Mason Hale
- Author abbrev. (botany): J.W.Thomson

John Walter Thomson Jr. (1913–2009) was a Scottish-born American botanist and lichenologist, sometimes referred to as the "Dean of North American Lichens".

== Biography ==
When he was eight years old, Thomson moved with his family to the U.S.A. In 1935 he graduated from Columbia University with a bachelor's degree, majoring in botany and zoology. At the University of Wisconsin–Madison (UW Madison) he graduated in botany with a master's degree in 1937 and a Ph.D. in 1939. After receiving his Ph.D., he worked as a naturalist at Manhattan's American Museum of Natural History and taught at Brooklyn College until 1942. During WW II, he taught topics in military aviation and meteorology from 1942 to 1944 for the U.S. Army Air Corps at Superior State Teachers College (now named the University of Wisconsin–Superior). In 1944 he became a faculty member of the department of botany at University of Wisconsin–Madison, retiring there in 1984 as professor emeritus. In retirement, he continued to work almost daily at the Madison campus until he was about 88 years old.

Thomson taught for many summers at the University of Minnesota's Itasca Biological Station and Laboratories campus, which is located on Lake Itasca. He collected lichens not only in the Arctic and in Wisconsin, but also in a number of other U.S. states, including "California, Florida, Indiana, Oklahoma, New York, Pennsylvania, and Washington". He was the author or coauthor of over 100 scientific articles. He accumulated a herbarium of lichens, which gave the Wisconsin State Herbarium at UW Madison perhaps the world's best lichen collection of North American and Arctic material. Thomson issued two exsiccatae, namely Lichenes Wisconsinenses exsiccati (1946–1960) and Lichenes Arctici (1960–1966).

In 1937 in Madison, Wisconsin, Thomson married the botanist and conservationist Olive Sherman. Upon his death he was survived by his widow, three sons, a daughter, and seven grandchildren. Another son, Douglas E. Thomson, M.D., died in 1978 at age 34. As a memorial to Douglas their dead son, John and Olive Thomson gave money to The Nature Conservancy for land acquisition, leading to the establishment of the Thomson Memorial Prairie, which consists of 323 acres (131 ha) of remnant dry prairie. Dennis Thomson and his wife Joan Schurch Thomson donated land to the nonprofit conservation organization The Prairie Enthusiasts, which created the 193-acre preserve (78 ha) named Schurch-Thomson Prairie.

== Awards and honors ==
- 1958–1959 — President of the American Bryological and Lichenological Society
- 1985 — Henry Allan Gleason Award of the New York Botanical Garden
- 1985 — Gulf Oil Conservation Award jointly given to John and Olive Thomson for their environmental activity
- 1992 — Acharius Medal of the International Association for Lichenology
- 1998 — Festschrift held in honor of Thomson's 85th birthday with published volume Lichenographia Thomsoniana (1998)
- 2010 — John Thomson Research Award established by the Botanical Club of Wisconsin

== Selected publications ==
=== Articles ===
- Thomson, John W. (1942). "The Lichen Genus Cladonia in Wisconsin". The American Midland Naturalist. 27 (3): 696–709. doi:10.2307/2420920. JSTOR 2420920.
- Thomson, John W. (1955). "Lichens of Arctic America. II. Additions to Records of Lichen Distribution in the Canadian Eastern Arctic". The Bryologist. 58 (3): 246–259. doi:10.1639/0007-2745(1955)58[246:LOAAIA]2.0.CO;2. JSTOR 3239914.
- Thomson, John W. (1960). "Agrestic cyphellata, a New Genus and Species of Lichen in the Usneaceae". The Bryologist. 63 (4): 246–250. doi:10.1639/0007-2745(1960)63[246:ACANGA]2.0.CO;2. JSTOR 3240565.
- Thomson, John W. (1967). "The Lichen Genus Baeomyces in North America North of Mexico". The Bryologist. 70 (3): 285–298. doi:10.1639/0007-2745(1967)70[285:TLGBIN]2.0.CO;2. JSTOR 3241088.
- Thomson, J. W.; Iltis, H. H. (1968). "A Fog-Induced Lichen Community in the Coastal Desert of Southern Peru". The Bryologist. 71 (1): 31–34. doi:10.1639/0007-2745(1968)71[31:AFLCIT]2.0.CO;2. JSTOR 3240649.
- Barrett, Paul E.; Thomson, John W. (1975). "Lichens from a High Arctic Coastal Lowland, Devon Island, N.W.T.". The Bryologist. 78 (2): 160–167. doi:10.2307/3242046. JSTOR 3242046.
- Thomson, J. W.; Bird, C. D. (1978). "The lichen genus Dactylina in North America". Canadian Journal of Botany. 56 (14): 1602–1624. doi:10.1139/b78-190.
- Moser, Thomas J.; Nash, Thomas H.; Thomson, John W. (1979). "Lichens of Anaktuvuk Pass, Alaska, with Emphasis on the Impact of Caribou Grazing". The Bryologist. 82 (3): 393–408. doi:10.2307/3242215. JSTOR 3242215.
- Thomson, Norman F.; Thomson, John W. (1984). "Spore Ornamentation in the Lichen Genus Solorina". The Bryologist. 87 (2): 151–153. doi:10.2307/3243122. JSTOR 3243122.
- Thomson, John W. (1987). "The Lichen Genera Catapyrenium and Placidiopsis in North America". The Bryologist. 90 (1): 27–39. doi:10.2307/3243269. JSTOR 3243269.
- Thomson, John W. (1991). "The Lichen Genus Staurothele in North America". The Bryologist. 94 (4): 351–367. doi:10.2307/3243824. JSTOR 3243824.
- Talbot, Stephen S.; Talbot, Sandra Looman; Thomson, John W. (1992). "Lichens of Tuxedni Wilderness Area, Alaska". The Bryologist. 95 (1): 20–30. doi:10.2307/3243780. JSTOR 3243780.
- Thomson, J (1995). "The distribution of Arctic lichens and thoughts concerning their origin". The Lichenologist. 27: 411–416. Bibcode:1995ThLic..27R.411T. doi:10.1016/S0024-2829(05)80002-7. ISSN 0024-2829.
- Talbot, S. S.; Thomson, J. W.; Schofield, W. B. (2007). "Lichens from Tetlin National Wildlife Refuge and vicinity, east-central Alaska". The Bryologist. 110 (1): 74–91. doi:10.1639/0007-2745(2007)110[74:LFTNWR]2.0.CO;2.

=== Books and monographs ===
- Thomson, John Walter (1963). The Lichen Genus Physcia in North America. J. Cramer. ISBN 9783768254076.
- —— (1967). The Lichen Genus Cladonia in North America. University of Toronto Press. ISBN 9780802014863.
- —— (1979). Lichens of the Alaskan Arctic Slope. University of Toronto Press. ISBN 9780802054289.
- —— (1984). American Arctic Lichens: The macrolichens. Columbia University Press. ISBN 9780231058889.
- —— (1984). American Arctic Lichens: The microlichens. Univ of Wisconsin Press. ISBN 9780299134600.
- —— (2003). Lichens of Wisconsin. Madison: Wisconsin State Herbarium. ISBN 0972739300; 386 pages

== See also ==
- Category:Taxa named by John Walter Thomson
