= Cabomba pitonii =

Cabomba pitonii Temporal range: Selandian

Scientific classification
- Kingdom: Plantae
- Clade: Tracheophytes
- Clade: Angiosperms
- Order: Nymphaeales
- Family: Cabombaceae
- Genus: Cabomba
- Species: †C. pitonii

Binomial name
- †Cabomba pitonii Laurent & Marty

Fossil species of aquatic plant

Cabomba pitonii is an extinct species of aquatic plant in the family Cabombaceae known from Menat, Puy-de-Dôme, France.

== Description ==
The species had submerged leaves.

== Taxonomy ==
The species was described by Louis Laurent and Pierre Marty in 1940. The original spelling was Cabomba pitoni. The type specimen was collected in Menat, Puy-de-Dôme, France. It has been dated either to the Eocene, or to the Paleocene (Selandian).
