= Cabomba inermis =

Cabomba inermis Temporal range: Selandian

Scientific classification (disputed)
- Kingdom: Plantae
- Clade: Tracheophytes
- Clade: Angiosperms
- Order: Nymphaeales
- Family: Cabombaceae
- Genus: Cabomba
- Species: †C. inermis

Binomial name
- †Cabomba inermis (Newb.) Hollick

Fossil species of aquatic plant

Cabomba inermis is a controversial fossil species of aquatic plant in the family Cabombaceae. The fossil has also been attributed to several other genera.

== Description ==
The leaves are dissected. The fossil may also be interpreted as roots.

== Taxonomy ==
It was first published as Psilotum inerme Newb. by John Strong Newberry in 1868. It was moved to the genus Cabomba Aubl. as Cabomba inermis (Newb.) Hollick by Arthur Hollick in 1899. Alternatively, it was placed in the genus Psilotites Münster as Psilotites inermis (Newb.) Schimp. by Wilhelm Philippe Schimper in 1874. The fossils may also be interpreted as roots of the genus Quereuxia Krysht., and may be assigned to the species Quereuxia angulata (NEWBERRY) Kryshtofovich.

=== Etymology ===
The specific epithet inermis means unarmed.
