= Cabomba gracilis =

Cabomba gracilis Temporal range: Paleocene

Scientific classification
- Kingdom: Plantae
- Clade: Tracheophytes
- Clade: Angiosperms
- Order: Nymphaeales
- Family: Cabombaceae
- Genus: Cabomba
- Species: †C. gracilis

Binomial name
- †Cabomba gracilis Newb.

Fossil species of aquatic plant

Cabomba gracilis is a fossil species of aquatic plant in the family Cabombaceae.

== Description ==
The slender, smooth stems bear opposite, dichotomously branched submerged leaves with linear or filiform segments.

== Taxonomy ==
It was published by John Strong Newberry in 1883. The fossil was collected by Dr. Hayden in Fort Union, North Dakota, USA.

=== Etymology ===
The specific epithet gracilis means graceful.
