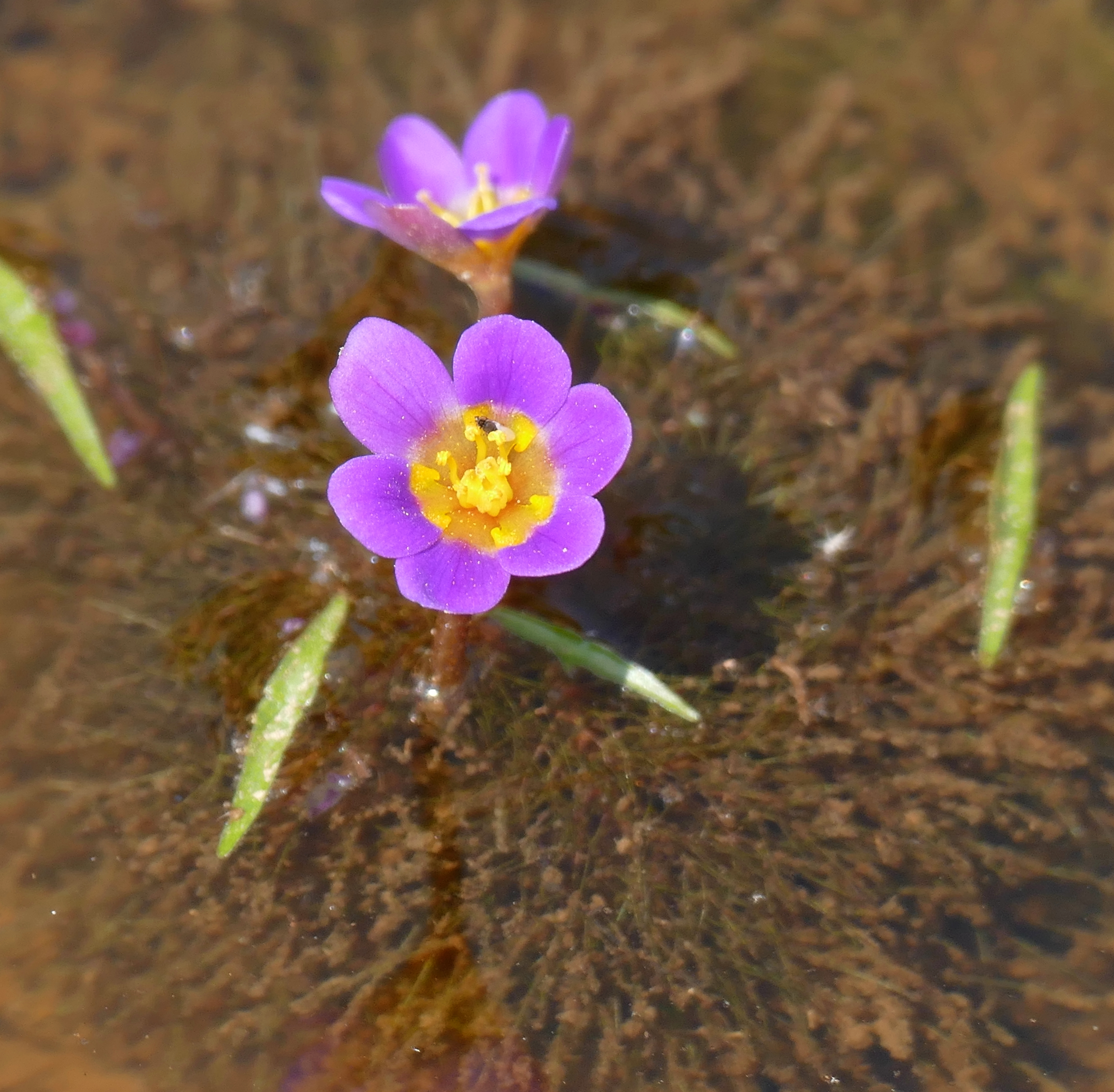
- Flowers

Scientific classification
- Kingdom: Plantae
- Clade: Tracheophytes
- Clade: Angiosperms
- Order: Nymphaeales
- Family: Cabombaceae
- Genus: Cabomba
- Species: C. furcata

Binomial name
- Cabomba furcata Schult. & Schult.f.

Synonyms
- List: Nectris furcata (Schult. & Schult.f.) Leandro ex Steud.; Cabomba piauhiensis Gardner; Cabomba pubescens Ule; Cabomba warmingii Casp.

= Cabomba furcata =

Species of aquatic plant

Cabomba furcata, also known as red cabomba and forked fanwort, is a rhizomatous, perennial, aquatic herb in the family Cabombaceae native to tropical America. It is used as an aquarium plant.

== Description ==
=== Vegetative characteristics ===
Cabomba furcata is a rhizomatous, perennial, aquatic herb. Both submerged and floating leaves are produced. The mostly whorled, dark purple submerged leaves are dichotomously or trichotomously branched.

=== Generative characteristics ===
The bisexual, purple, 5–10 mm long, and 6–12 mm wide flowers have 2–5.5 cm long pedicels.

=== Cytology ===
The chromosome count is 2n = 52. The chloroplast genome of Cabomba furcata is 160271 bp long.

== Taxonomy ==
It was published by Josef August Schultes and Julius Hermann Schultes in 1830. The lectotype specimen, which was collected by Leandro do Sacramento in 1821, was designated in 1991 by Marian Ørgaard.

=== Etymology ===
The specific epithet furcata means forked.

== Ecology ==
=== Habitat ===
It occurs in freshwater lagoons, ponds, streams, lakes, and floodplains.

== Cultivation ==
This is used as an aquarium plant. Carbon dioxide addition is usually necessary, mostly because this plant requires high light and regular fertilization for optimal growth.

== As an invasive species ==
Cabomba furcata has been reported as an invasive species in Kerala, India, in the Kalutara district of Sri Lanka, in Chini Lake, Malaysia, and Taiwan. Its active stem propagation prevents light from penetrating the surface of water. It suffocates the water bodies, economically and ecologically hindering the growth of native aquatic plants and freshwater fish. Red cabomba requires huge quantity of oxygen, resulting in decline of biodiversity and water quality.
