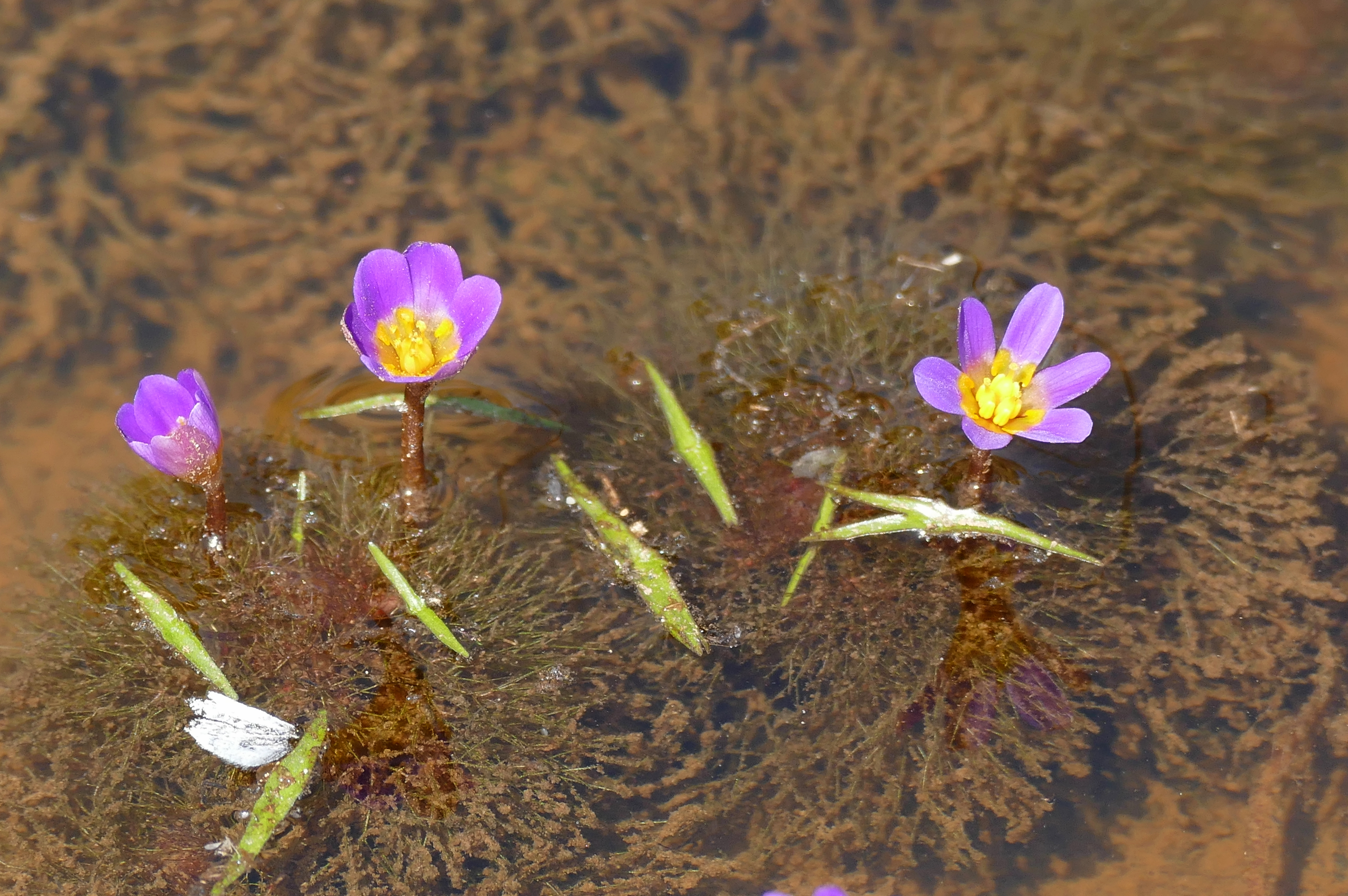
- Cabomba furcata with flowers, floating leaves, and submerged leaves

Scientific classification
- Kingdom: Plantae
- Clade: Tracheophytes
- Clade: Angiosperms
- Order: Nymphaeales
- Family: Cabombaceae
- Genus: Cabomba; Aubl.

Type species
- Cabomba aquatica Aublet

Species
- See text

Synonyms
- Nectris Schreb.; Villarsia Neck.

= Cabomba =

Genus of aquatic plants

Cabomba is a genus of perennial, rhizomatous, aquatic herbs in the family Cabombaceae native to tropical and subtropical America. It has divided submerged leaves in the shape of a fan (hence the vernacular name fanwort) and is much favoured by aquarists as an ornamental and oxygenating plant for fish tanks. One species, Cabomba caroliniana, is a nationally declared weed in Australia, where it has choked up waterways after escaping from aquaria.

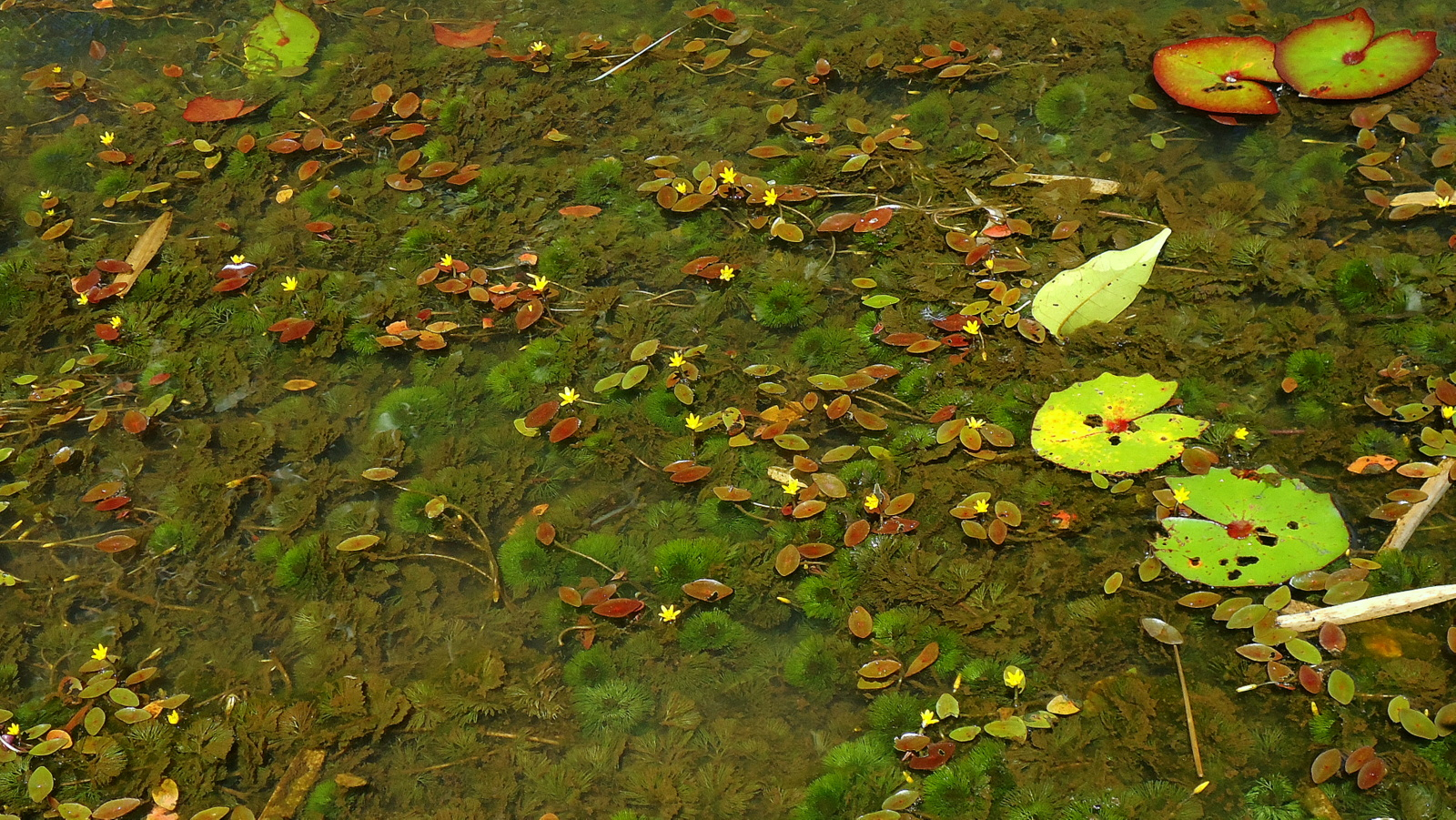
Cabomba aquatica growing sympatrically with Nymphaea rudgeana

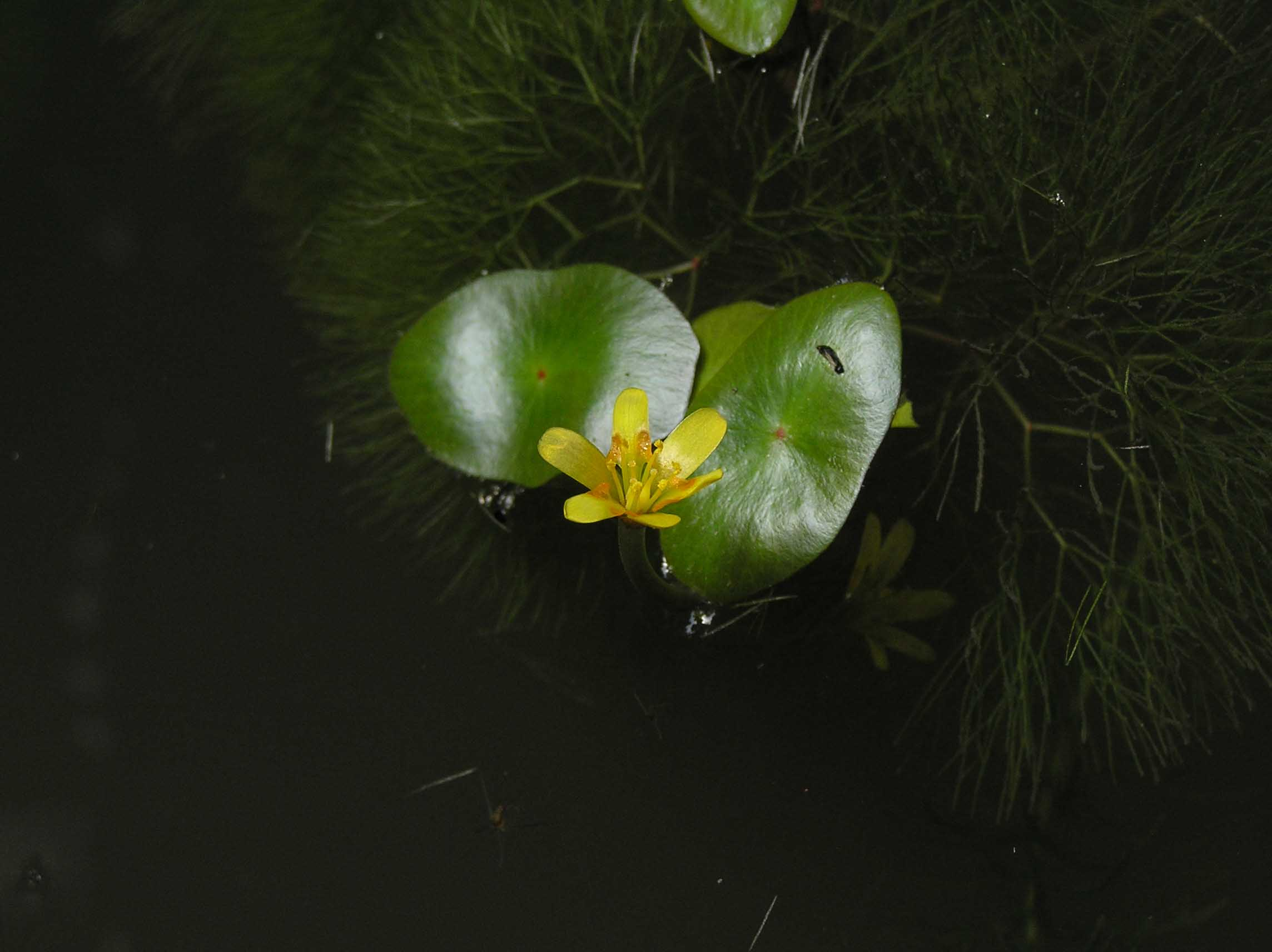
Detail of peltate floating leaves and flower of Cabomba aquatica

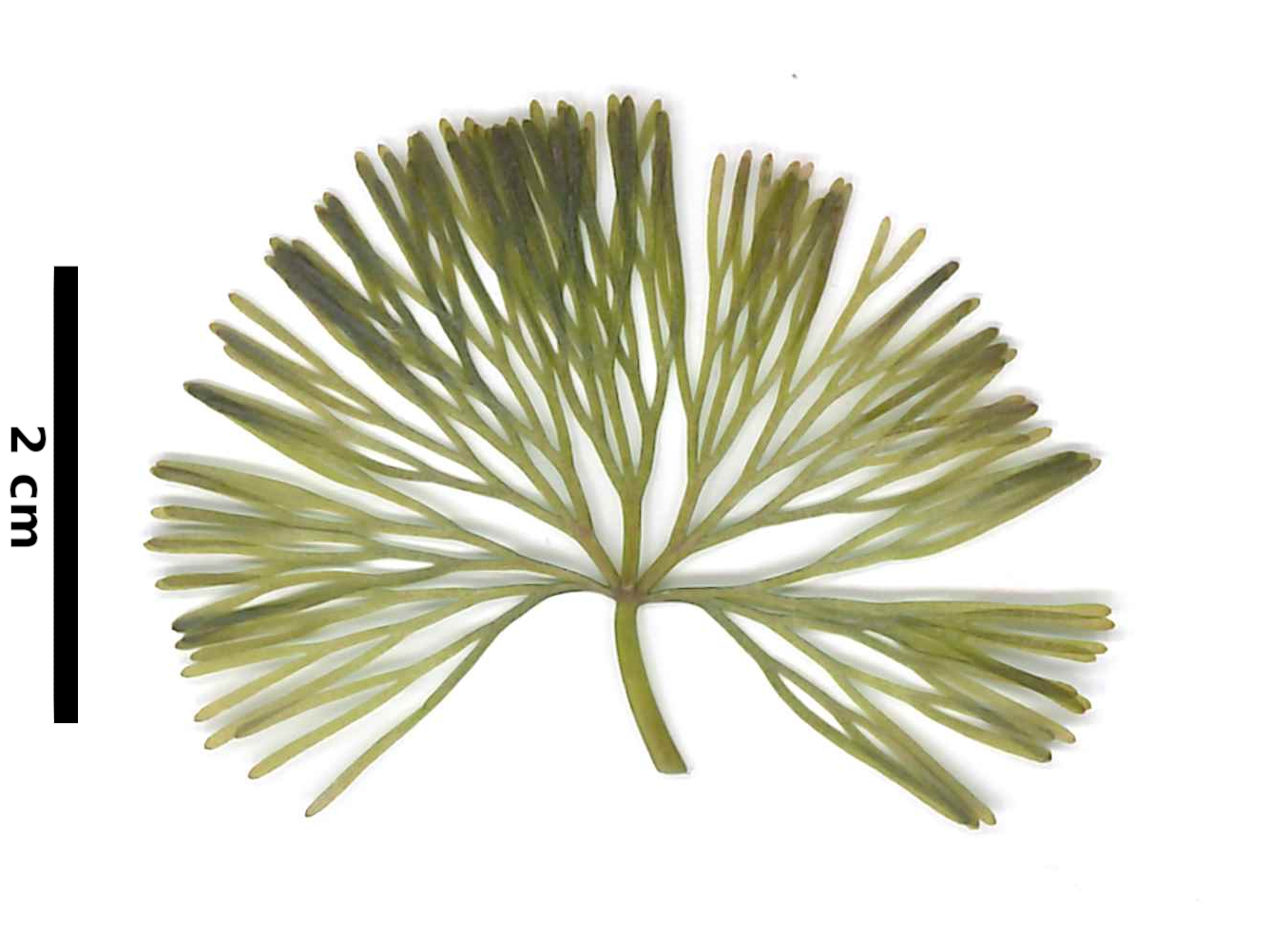
Submerged leaf of Cabomba caroliniana A.Gray with scale bar (2 cm) on a white background

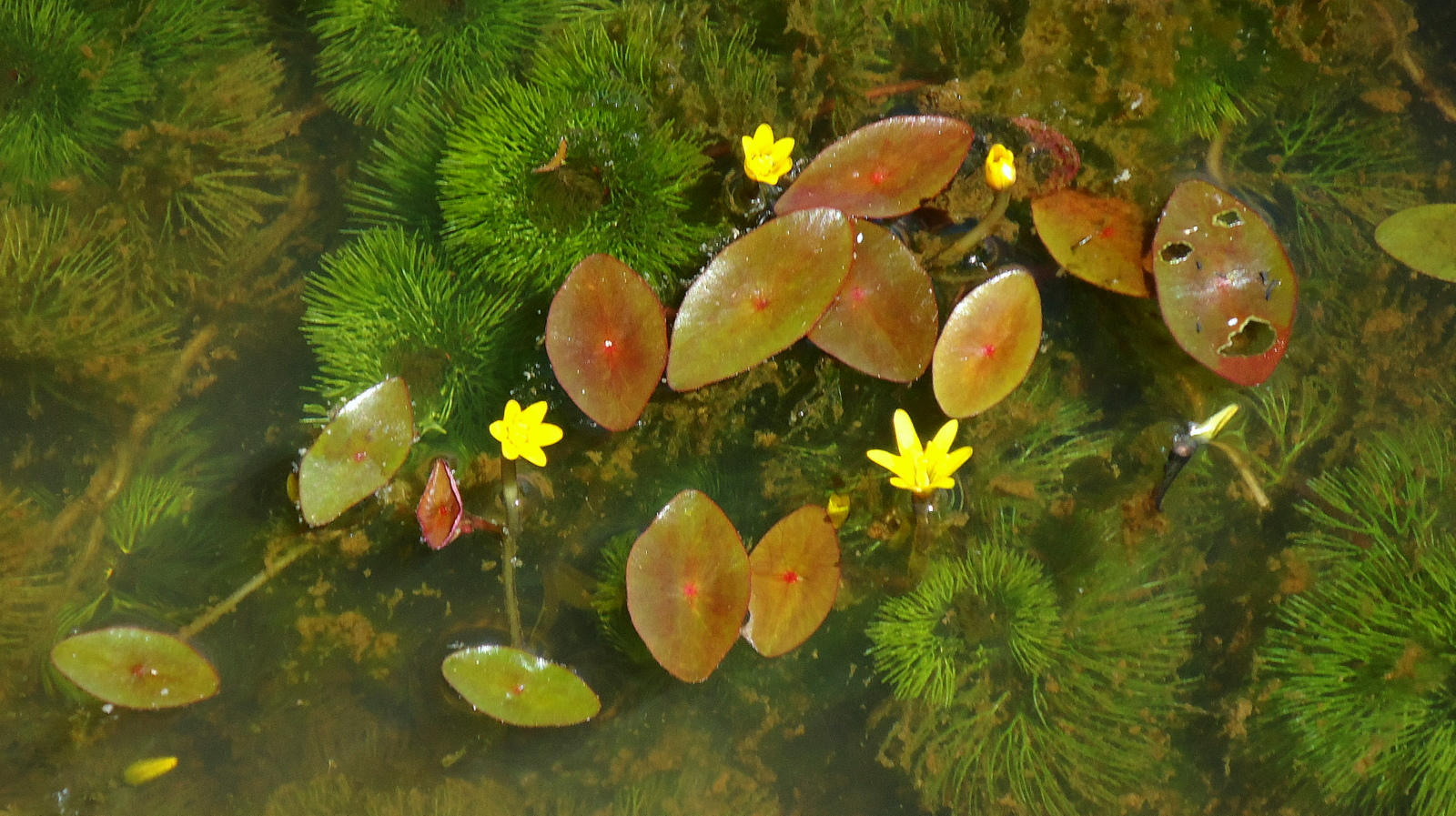
Cabomba aquatica Aubl.

== Description ==
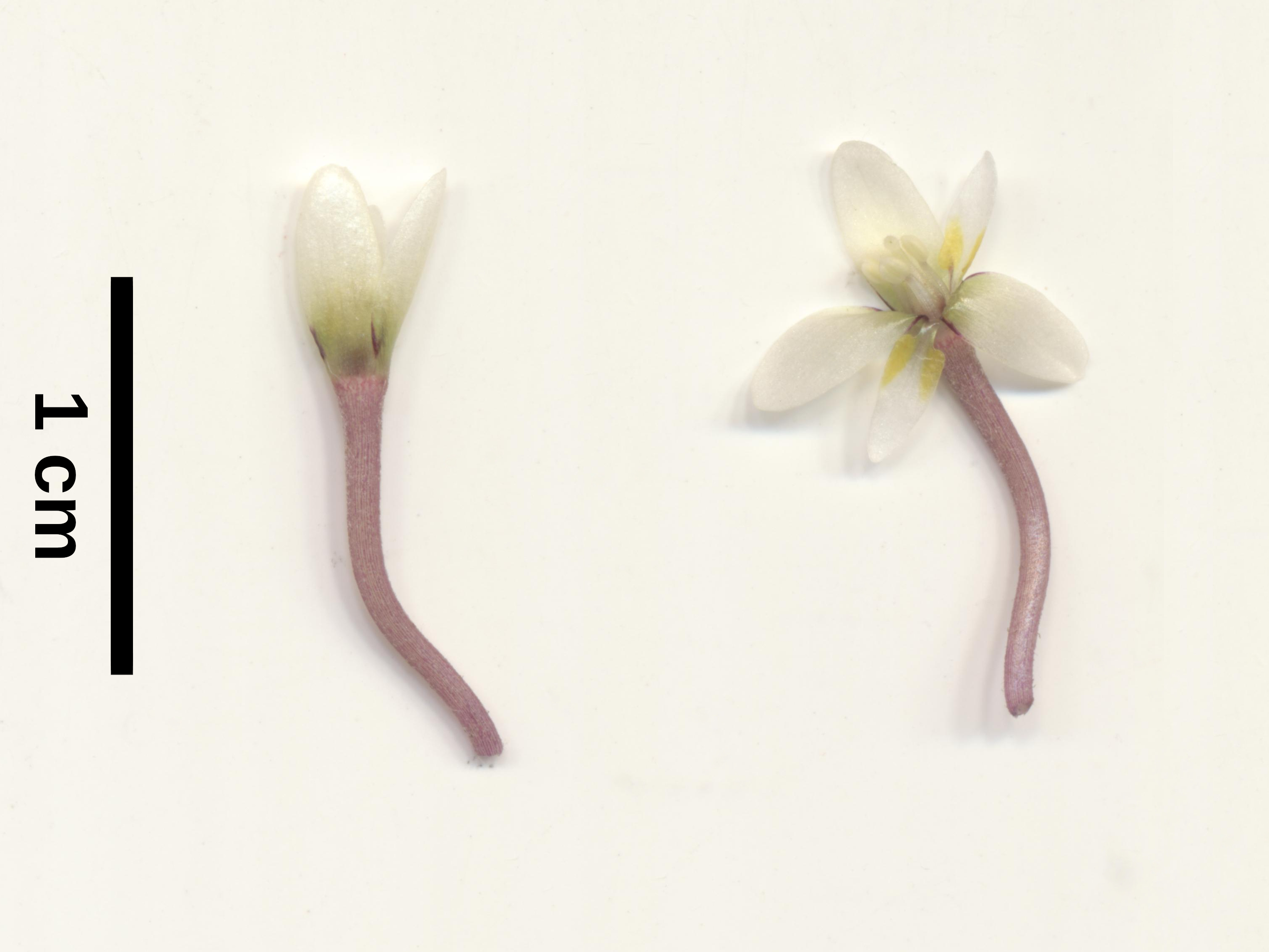
Cabomba palaeformis flower with scale bar (1 cm)

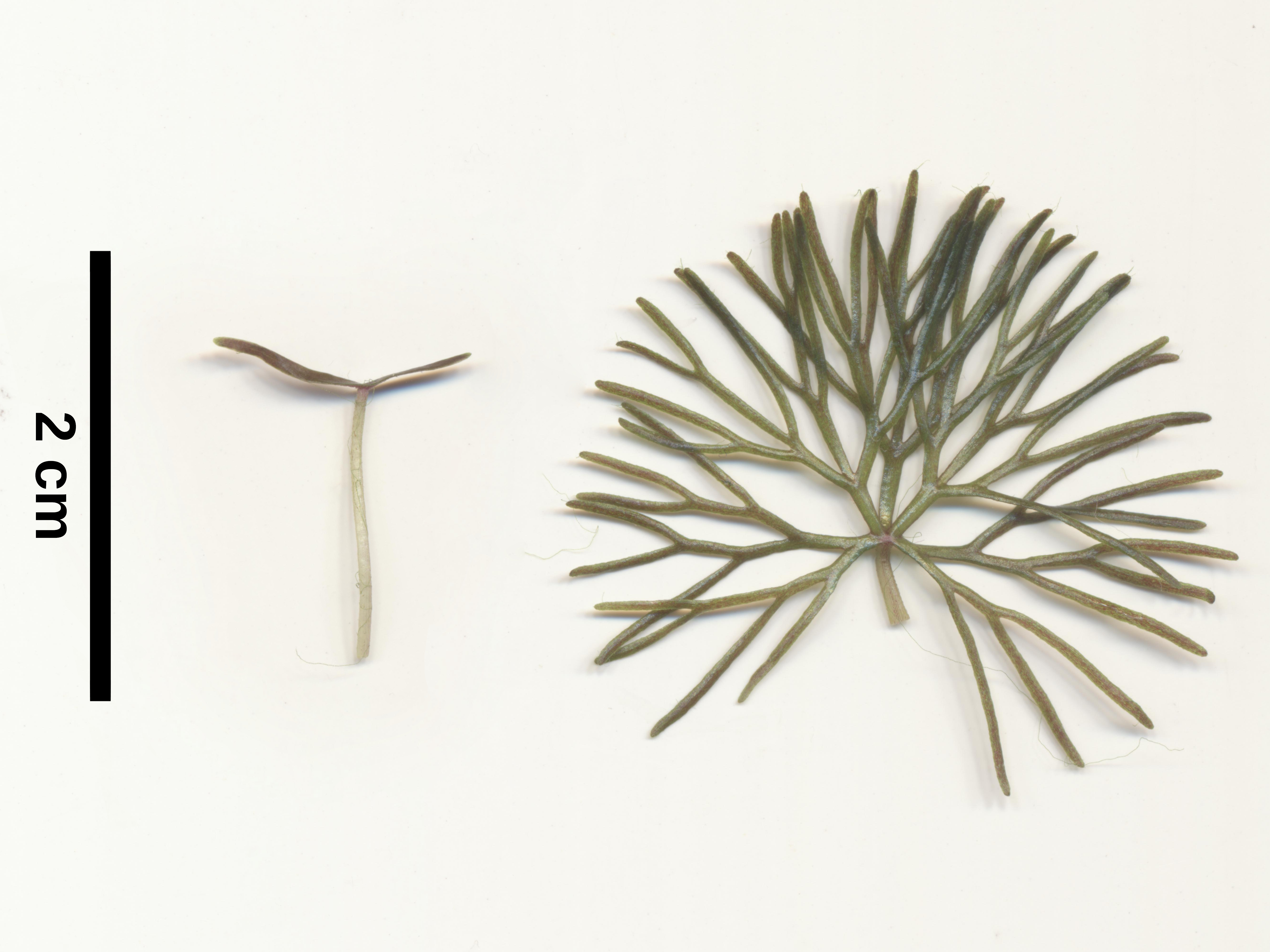
Floating (left) and submerged (right) leaves of Cabomba palaeformis with scale bar (2 cm)

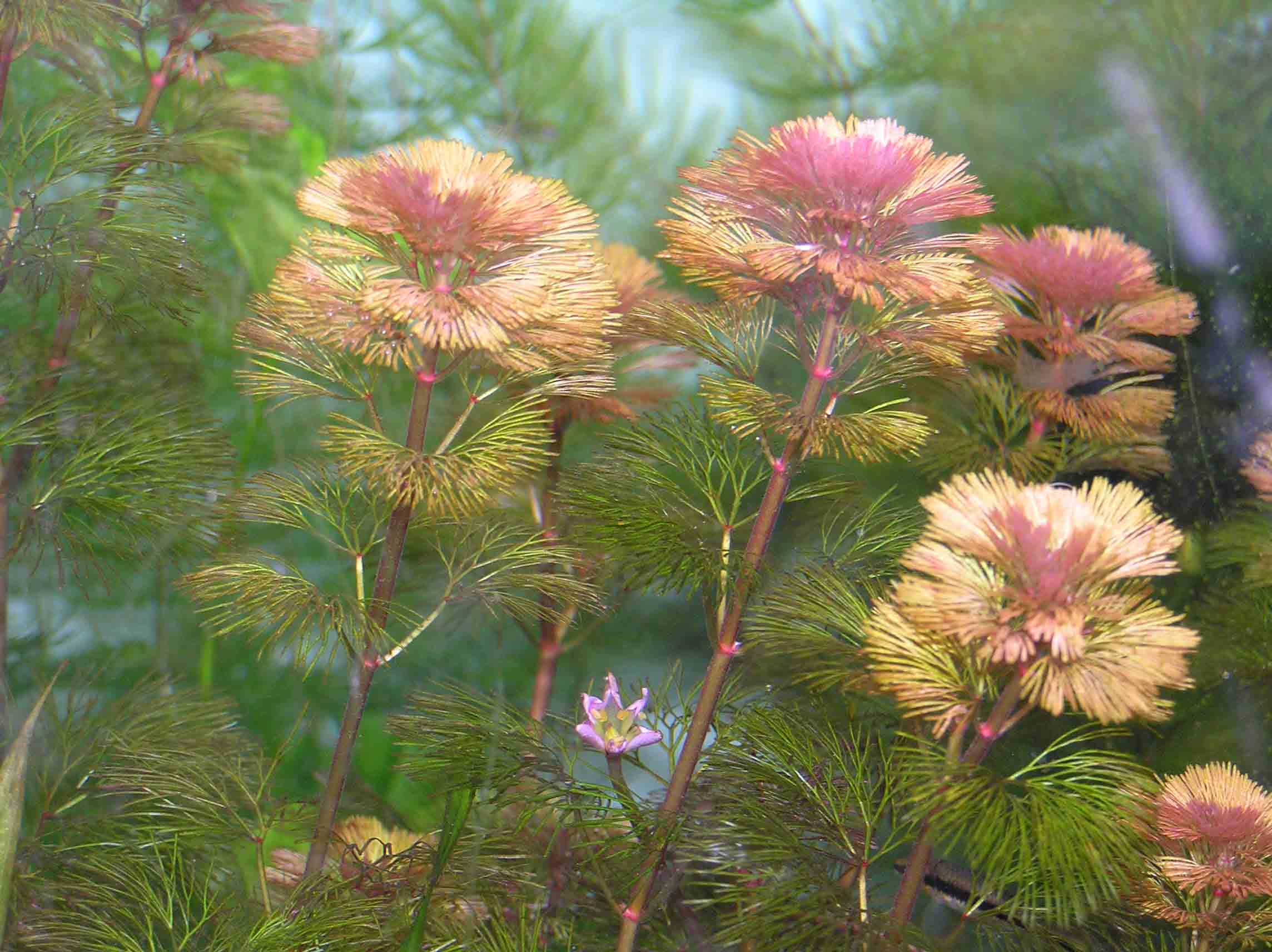
Submerged stems of Cabomba furcata

=== Vegetative characteristics ===
Cabomba are perennial, rhizomatous, aquatic herbs with short, brown rhizomes. The roots, which are formed on the lower nodes of the stems, are delicate, brown to white, and branched. The long, cylindrical, flexible, delicate, branched or unbranched stems are 2–4 mm wide, and up to 4 m long. Both floating and submerged leaves are present, but only few floating leaves are produced, and they may be absent entirely. The submerged leaves are divided into 3–7 dichotomously or trichotomously branched parts. The floating leaves are inconspicuous.

=== Generative characteristics ===
The solitary, hermaphrodite, pedicellate, chasmogamous, scentless, actinomorphic, white, yellow, or purple, trimerous or rarely di- and tetramerous flowers extend beyond the water surface. The petals are oval-shaped, and are usually about 2.0 cm (0.79 in) across when fully developed. The petals are unlike the sepals in that the former have two yellow ear-shaped nectaries at the base. Petals may also have purplish edges. Flowers are protogynous, having primarily female sexual structures on the first day of appearance and then switching to male on the second and subsequent days. Pollination occurs above the waterline. Principal pollinators are flies and other small flying insects.

=== Cytology ===
Various chromosome counts have been observed in Cabomba: 2n = 26, 39, 52, 78, 104.

== Taxonomy ==
It was published by Jean Baptiste Christophore Fusée Aublet in 1775. The type species is Cabomba aquatica Aubl.

=== Species ===
The genus Cabomba Aubl. consists of six extant species:

- Cabomba aquatica Aubl. (fanwort)
- Cabomba caroliniana A. Gray (green cabomba)
- Cabomba furcata Schult. & Schult.f. (red cabomba)
- Cabomba haynesii Wiersema
- Cabomba palaeformis Fassett
- Cabomba schwartzii Rataj

And four fossil species:

- Cabomba gracilis Newb.
- Cabomba grandis Newb.
- Cabomba inermis (Newb.) Hollick
- Cabomba pitonii L. Laurent & Marty

=== Putative hybridisation ===
It has been speculated, that Cabomba haynesii may be a result of a hybridisation event involving Cabomba palaeformis and Cabomba furcata.

=== Etymology ===
The generic name Cabomba may be derived from an aboriginal name of the plant in Guyana.

== Distribution ==
It is native to tropical and subtropical America, and the centre of diversity is Brazil.

== Ecology ==
=== Pollination ===
The flowers are pollinated by flies and bees.

=== Habitat ===
Cabomba occurs in ponds, floodplains, swamps, and creeks.

== Cabomba as an aquarium plant ==
Cabomba species are popular aquarium plants. Cabomba caroliniana is easily cultivated and is tolerant of various substrates and temperatures. However, in dimly lit conditions the leaves grow small and the internodes of the stems elongate. By contrast, Cabomba furcata is considered to be difficult to cultivate in the aquarium, as it requires soft, acid water and a high light intensity.

== Invasive species ==
Use in the aquarium trade has led to some species being introduced to other parts of the world, such as Australia, where Cabomba caroliniana it is a nationally declared weed. Having arrived in 1967, it spread rapidly in waterways and out-competed native plants, threatening water supplies, especially along the eastern side of the continent. In Australia, Cabomba caroliniana has been targeted by both chemical, and biological control. Herbicide treatment is effective, yet also damages the remaining aquatic flora and fauna. The cabomba weevil (Hydrotimetes natans) is introduced to waterways as a means of biological control of Cabomba caroliniana. They consume the plant's tips and inflict significant harm when present in large quantities. Larvae burrow within the stems and result in substantial damage to the main stem due to tissue necrosis.

Likewise, Cabomba furcata has become an invasive species in Kerala, India, in the Kalutara district of Sri Lanka, in Chini Lake, Malaysia, and Taiwan. Its presence leads to a decline of water quality and biodiversity.
