= Norman Carter Fassett =

American botanist

- Born: March 27, 1900; Ware, Massachusetts
- Died: September 14, 1954 (aged 54); Boothbay Harbor, Maine
- Education: Harvard University
- Scientific career
- Fields: Botany
- Workplaces: University of Wisconsin
- Doctoral advisor: Merritt Lyndon Fernald
- Doctoral students: Lloyd Herbert Shinners; John W. Thomson
- Author abbrev. (botany): Fassett

Norman Carter Fassett (March 27, 1900 – September 14, 1954) was an American botanist and professor, known as an expert on the aquatic flora of Wisconsin.

== Career ==
Fassett was born in Ware, Massachusetts. He studied at Harvard University, eventually earning his Ph.D. in 1925. That year, he was appointed an instructor of botany at the University of Wisconsin. By 1944, he had advanced to full professor and was curator of the university herbarium. Under his direction, the herbarium grew from a size of 96,000 specimens to 380,000 specimens. Fassett personally collected over 28,000. From 1948 to 1949, he was chair of the botany department.

Fassett participated in the Colombian Cinchona Mission, where he was part of a group searching for and studying Cinchona trees during World War II. He later participated in research expeditions in Guatemala, El Salvador, and Nicaragua.

From 1945 to 1950, Fassett served as chairman of the Natural Areas Committee of the Wisconsin Department of Natural Resources. He led the effort to establish Parfrey's Glen as a scientific research area.

Fassett was a founding member of the American Society of Plant Taxonomists in 1935, and served as the president of the organization for the year preceding his death. He died of a brain tumor in Boothbay Harbor, Maine on September 14, 1954.

== Publications ==
Fassett authored over 100 professional papers, mostly concerning the flora of North America.

Norman C. Fasset authored the book "A Manual of Aquatic Plants". SBN:299-01450-9; LC 57-6593

Published by The University of Wisconsin Press in 1940. Shortly before his death Dr. Fassett arranged for a revised edition of this book. Eugene C. Ogden handled the revision and attempted to bring the book more inline with present-day (1956) nomenclature.

== Eponyms ==
Several species were named in honor of Fassett, including:

- Callitriche fassettii Schotsman, 1966
- Elatine fassettiana Steyerm., 1952
- Eleocharis fassettii S.González & P.M.Peterson, 2008
- Tillandsia fassettii L.B.Sm., 1955
