= Barclaya motleyi =

Conservation status
- Data Deficient (IUCN 3.1)

Scientific classification
- Kingdom: Plantae
- Clade: Tracheophytes
- Clade: Angiosperms
- Order: Nymphaeales
- Family: Nymphaeaceae
- Genus: Barclaya
- Species: B. motleyi

Binomial name
- Barclaya motleyi Hook.f.

Synonyms
- Hydrostemma motleyi (Hook.f.) Mabb.; Barclaya hirta (Kurz ex Teijsm. & Binn.) Miq.; Barclaya kunstleri (King) Ridl.; Barclaya motleyi var. kunstleri King; Hydrostemma kunstleri (King) B.C.Stone; Nymphaea hirta Kurz ex Teijsm. & Binn.

Species of perennial aquatic plant

Barclaya motleyi is a species of perennial aquatic plant native to the region spanning from Thailand to Western Malesia, and New Guinea.

== Description ==
=== Vegetative characteristics ===
Barclaya motleyi is an aquatic, stoloniferous plant with 2–6 cm long rhizomes. The round to ovate, petiolate leaves are 4–8 cm wide.

=== Generative characteristics ===
The nocturnal flowers are 6–8 cm wide. They have 20-35 anthers. The gynoecium consists of 7-9 carpels. The stigmatic cup has 7-9 carpellary appendages. The round, 1.5 cm wide fruit bears echinate, ellipsoid, 1 mm long, and 0.5 mm wide seeds. The floral fragrance has been describes as pungent and solvent like.

=== Cytology ===
The chromosome count is 2n = 36.

== Reproduction ==
=== Vegetative reproduction ===
It is stoloniferous.

=== Generative reproduction ===
The flowers are emergent and chasmogamous. Autogamy can occur in Barclaya motleyi. The fruits ripen within 4–5 months.

== Taxonomy ==
It was first described by Joseph Dalton Hooker in 1860. The type specimen was collected by James Motley in Bangarmassing, Kalimantan, Indonesia between 1857 and 1858.

=== Species delimitation ===
Barclaya kunstleri was believed to be synonymous with Barclaya motleyi, but is now believed to be a separate species. It had also been previously treated as Barclaya motleyi var. kunstleri King and it is still regarded as a synonym of Barclaya motleyi by other sources. Likewise, Barclaya hirta is regarded as a synonym of Barclaya motleyi, but is accepted as a separate species by others.

=== Putative hybridisation ===
It has been speculated, that Barclaya kunstleri may be a result of hybridisation of Barclaya motleyi and Barclaya longifolia.

=== Etymology ===
The specific epithet motleyi honours James Motley, who discovered this species, and sent preserved specimens to England. Motley had chosen the specific epithet rotundifolia, but after he and his family were killed, Joseph Dalton Hooker decided to name it in honour of its deceased discoverer.

== Conservation ==
The IUCN conservation status is data deficient (DD). It faces threats from habitat destruction for agriculture or development, dam construction, potential collection pressure, and pollution. A newer study categories it as least concern (LC).

== Ecology ==
=== Habitat ===
Barclaya motleyi occurs in shallow streams with silt or sandy substrates in rainforests, rubber plantations, and urban environments.

=== Pollination ===
A field observation during the duration of three weeks failed to identify any pollinators.

== Cultivation ==
It is used in the aquarium trade. It can be cultivated in muddy, acid, fertile soils at temperatures of 22-26 °C.
