= Garasbahia =

Garasbahia Temporal range: 100.5–93.9 Ma Cenomanian, Late Cretaceous

Scientific classification
- Kingdom: Plantae
- Clade: Tracheophytes
- Clade: Angiosperms
- Order: Nymphaeales
- Family: Cabombaceae
- Genus: †Garasbahia; Krassilov et Bacchia
- Species: †G. flexuosa

Binomial name
- †Garasbahia flexuosa Krassilov et Bacchia

Fossil species of aquatic plant

Garasbahia flexuosa is a fossil species of aquatic plant, which occurred in the lower Cretaceous period of Morocco.

== Description ==
=== Vegetative characteristics ===
Garasbahia flexuosa is a rhizomatous, aquatic plant with slim, branching, elongate stems. The elliptical to orbicular, peltate leaves have an entire margin.

== Taxonomy ==
=== Publication ===
It was first published by Valentine A. Krassilov and Flavio Bacchia in 2013.

=== Type specimen ===
The type specimen was collected from Gara Sbaa Hill, southeastern Morocco.

=== Position within Nymphaeales ===
It is placed in the family Cabombaceae.

== Etymology ==
The generic name Garasbahia is derived from the type locality Gara Sbah, Morocco. The specific epithet flexuosa means flexible.
