= Brasenites =

Brasenites Temporal range: 145–100.5 Ma Early Cretaceous

Scientific classification
- Kingdom: Plantae
- Clade: Embryophytes
- Clade: Tracheophytes
- Clade: Angiosperms
- Order: Nymphaeales
- Family: Cabombaceae
- Genus: †Brasenites; Wang et Dilcher
- Species: †B. k. krasseri

Binomial name
- †Brasenites kansense, krasseri Wang et Dilcher

Species of aquatic plant

Brasenites kansense was a species of aquatic plant, which occurred in the Early Cretaceous of the United States of America and Late Cretaceous of Europe.

== Description ==
=== Vegetative characteristics ===
Brasenites kansense has suborbicular to orbicular, petiolate, peltate leaves with entire margins. The orbicular leaves are 6–8 cm wide, and the suborbicular leaves are 7.5-12.2 cm long, and 6–10.1 cm wide. The leaf venation is actinodromous.

== Taxonomy ==
=== Publication ===
It was published by Hongshan Wang and David L. Dilcher in 2006.

=== Type specimen ===
The type specimen was collected in Barton County, Kansas, USA.

=== Position within Nymphaeales ===
It is placed in the family Cabombaceae.

== Etymology ==
The generic name Brasenites expresses an association to the genus Brasenia. The specific epithet kansense refers to Kansas, USA.
