= Barclaya panchorensis =

Scientific classification
- Kingdom: Plantae
- Clade: Tracheophytes
- Clade: Angiosperms
- Order: Nymphaeales
- Family: Nymphaeaceae
- Genus: Barclaya
- Species: B. panchorensis

Binomial name
- Barclaya panchorensis Komala
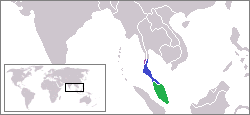
- Barclaya panchorensis is endemic to peninsular Malaysia

Species of perennial aquatic plant

Barclaya panchorensis is a species of perennial aquatic plant endemic to Peninsular Malaysia.

== Description ==
=== Vegetative characteristics ===
Barclaya panchorensis is an aquatic plant with stoloniferous, 2–4 cm long, and 0.5 cm wide rhizomes. The slender stolons are up to 40 cm long. The coriaceous, green, petiolate, cordate to circular leaves are 3–5 cm wide. The pubescent or glabrous, green petioles are 5–10 cm long.

=== Generative characteristics ===
The nocturnal, 5 cm wide flowers are attached to pubescent to glabrous, 10–15 cm long peduncles. The flowers have staminodes, and 20-30 anthers. The gynoecium consists of 8-10 carpels. The globose,1 cm wide fruit bears ellipsoid, echinate, 1 mm long, and 0.5 mm wide seeds.

=== Cytology ===
The diploid chromosome count is 2n= 36.

== Reproduction ==
=== Vegetative reproduction ===
It can reproduce vegetatively through the formation of stolons.

=== Generative reproduction ===
Autogamy can occur in Barclaya panchorensis.

== Taxonomy ==
It was first described by Thirumalai Komala in 2022. The type specimen was collected in Taman Negeri Bukit Panchor, Malaysia on the 26th of May 2015.

=== Etymology ===
The specific epithet panchorensis references the type locality Taman Negeri Bukit Panchor.

== Conservation ==
It is classified as data deficient (DD).

== Ecology ==
=== Habitat ===
It occurs in swamps and streams beneath tropical forest. It occurs sympatrically with Cryptocoryne elliptica Hook.f.
