= Barclaya wellyi =

Scientific classification
- Kingdom: Plantae
- Clade: Tracheophytes
- Clade: Angiosperms
- Order: Nymphaeales
- Family: Nymphaeaceae
- Genus: Barclaya
- Species: B. wellyi

Binomial name
- Barclaya wellyi Wongso, Ipor & N.Jacobsen
- Barclaya wellyi is endemic to Sumatra, Indonesia

Species of perennial aquatic plant

Barclaya wellyi is a species of perennial aquatic plant native to Sumatra, Indonesia.

== Description ==
=== Vegetative characteristics ===
Barclaya wellyi is an aquatic plant with 2–5 cm long, 1 cm wide, stoloniferous, villous rhizomes. The 10-15 petiolate, cordate leaves are 6–10 cm long, and 6–10 cm wide. The petioles are 10–20 cm long.

=== Generative characteristics ===
The nocturnal, 4 cm wide flowers are attached to 5–20 cm long peduncles. The outer tepals are 3 cm long. The four inner tepals are 1.5 cm long. Staminodes and fertile stamina are present. The flowers have 20-30 anthers. The stigmatic cup has 9 carpellary appendages. The ellipsoid fruit bears 2 mm long, spiny, ellipsoid, dark brown seeds.

=== Cytology ===
The diploid chromosome count is 2n= 36.

== Reproduction ==
=== Vegetative reproduction ===
It can reproduce vegetatively through the formation of stolons.

== Taxonomy ==
It was first described by Suwidji Wongso, Isa Ipor, and Niels Jacobsen in 2022. The type specimen was collected by Suwidji Wongso in Sumatra, Indonesia on the 27th of May 2021. Material had been collected earlier from the type location, but it was only later recognised to be distinct.

=== Etymology ===
The specific epithet wellyi honours Mr. Welly Yansen.

== Conservation ==
It is classified as data deficient (DD) under the IUCN criteria.

== Ecology ==
=== Habitat ===
It is only known from the type location, where it occurs beneath an old rubber plantation close to an oil palm plantation. The habitat is characterised by acid waters at water temperatures of 29 °C. It occurs sympatrically with Cryptocoryne minima Ridl.
