= Barclaya rugosa =

Scientific classification
- Kingdom: Plantae
- Clade: Tracheophytes
- Clade: Angiosperms
- Order: Nymphaeales
- Family: Nymphaeaceae
- Genus: Barclaya
- Species: B. rugosa

Binomial name
- Barclaya rugosa Sofiman Othman & N.Jacobsen
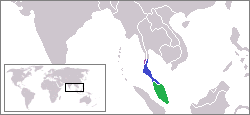
- Barclaya rugosa is endemic to peninsular Malaysia

Species of perennial aquatic plant

Barclaya rugosa is a species of perennial aquatic plant endemic to peninsular Malaysia.

== Description ==
=== Vegetative characteristics ===
Barclaya rugosa is an aquatic plant with densely villous, 2–8 cm long, and 1–2 cm wide rhizomes. The rugose, cordate, bright green, petiolate, leaves are 8–17 cm long, and 8–16 cm wide. The green petioles are 5–15 cm long.

=== Generative characteristics ===
The 5-6 cm wide diurnal flowers are attached to 10-15 cm long peduncles. The flowers have 40–50 anthers. The gynoecium consists of 9 carpels. The globose, 2 cm wide fruit bears ellipsoid, spiny, 2 mm long seeds. The floral fragrance has been characterised as pungent, fermenting, and as smelling of rotten meat.

=== Cytology ===
The diploid chromosome count is 2n= 36.

== Reproduction ==
=== Vegetative reproduction ===
Stolons have not been observed.

=== Generative reproduction ===
The flowers are day blooming.

== Taxonomy ==
It was first described by Sofiman Othman and Niels Jacobsen in 2022. The type specimen has been collected in West Malaysia on the 16th of August 1966.

=== Etymology ===
The specific epithet rugosa refers to the rugose leaves.

== Conservation ==
It is classified as least concern (LC) under the IUCN criteria.

== Ecology ==
=== Habitat ===
It occurs in shadid habitats with streams, temporary pools, and marshy areas. Seedlings can grow submerged, but mature plants suffer under fully submerged conditions. They are genuinely emergent.

=== Pollination ===
It may be pollinated by flies.
