= Barclaya rotundifolia =

Scientific classification
- Kingdom: Plantae
- Clade: Tracheophytes
- Clade: Angiosperms
- Order: Nymphaeales
- Family: Nymphaeaceae
- Genus: Barclaya
- Species: B. rotundifolia

Binomial name
- Barclaya rotundifolia M.Hotta

Species of perennial aquatic plant

Barclaya rotundifolia is a species of perennial aquatic plant native peninsular Malaysia, and Borneo.

== Description ==
=== Vegetative characteristics ===
Barclaya rotundifolia is an aquatic plant with stoloniferous, short, and thick rhizomes. The stolons are 2 mm wide. The green, rounded leaves are 4-7 cm wide.

=== Generative characteristics ===
The nocturnal, 5 cm wide flowers are attached to 5-10 cm long peduncles. The flowers have 30-50 anthers. The gynoecium consists of 10-12 carpels. The globose, 1 cm wide fruit bears echinate, brown, ellipsoid, 2 mm long seeds.

=== Cytology ===
The diploid chromosome count is 2n= 36.

== Reproduction ==
=== Vegetative reproduction ===
It can reproduce vegetatively through the formation of stolons.

== Taxonomy ==
It was first described by Mitsuru Hotta in 1966. The type specimen was collected by Mitsuru Hotta in Sungai Beangang, Bintulu, Sarawak, Malaysia, on the 23rd of November 1963.

=== Etymology ===
The specific epithet rotundifolia, from the Latin rotundus and folium, means round-leaved.

== Conservation ==
It is classified as data deficient (DD).

== Ecology ==
=== Habitat ===
It occurs in streams, and pools beneath tropical forest. It can grow in a submerged or emerged state.
