= Scutifolium =

Scutifolium Temporal range: 145–100.5 Ma Early Cretaceous

Scientific classification
- Kingdom: Plantae
- Clade: Tracheophytes
- Clade: Angiosperms
- Order: Nymphaeales
- Family: Cabombaceae
- Genus: †Scutifolium; Taylor, Brenner & Basha
- Species: †S. jordanicum

Binomial name
- †Scutifolium jordanicum Taylor, Brenner & Basha

Species of aquatic plant

Scutifolium jordanicum was a species of aquatic plant, which occurred in the lower Cretaceous period of Jordan.

== Description ==
=== Vegetative characteristics ===
The petiolate, symmetrical, microphyllous, elliptical leaves of Scutifolium jordanicum are 22-51 mm long, and 19-37 mm wide.

== Taxonomy ==
=== Publication ===
It was published by David Winship Taylor, Gilbert J. Brenner, and Sa’d Hasan Basha in 2008.

=== Type specimen ===
The type specimen was collected in Mahis, Jordan.

=== Position within Nymphaeales ===
It is placed in the family Cabombaceae.

== Etymology ==
The generic name Scutifolium is derived from the Latin scutum meaning shield and folium meaning leaf. The specific epithet jordanicum means "from Jordan".
