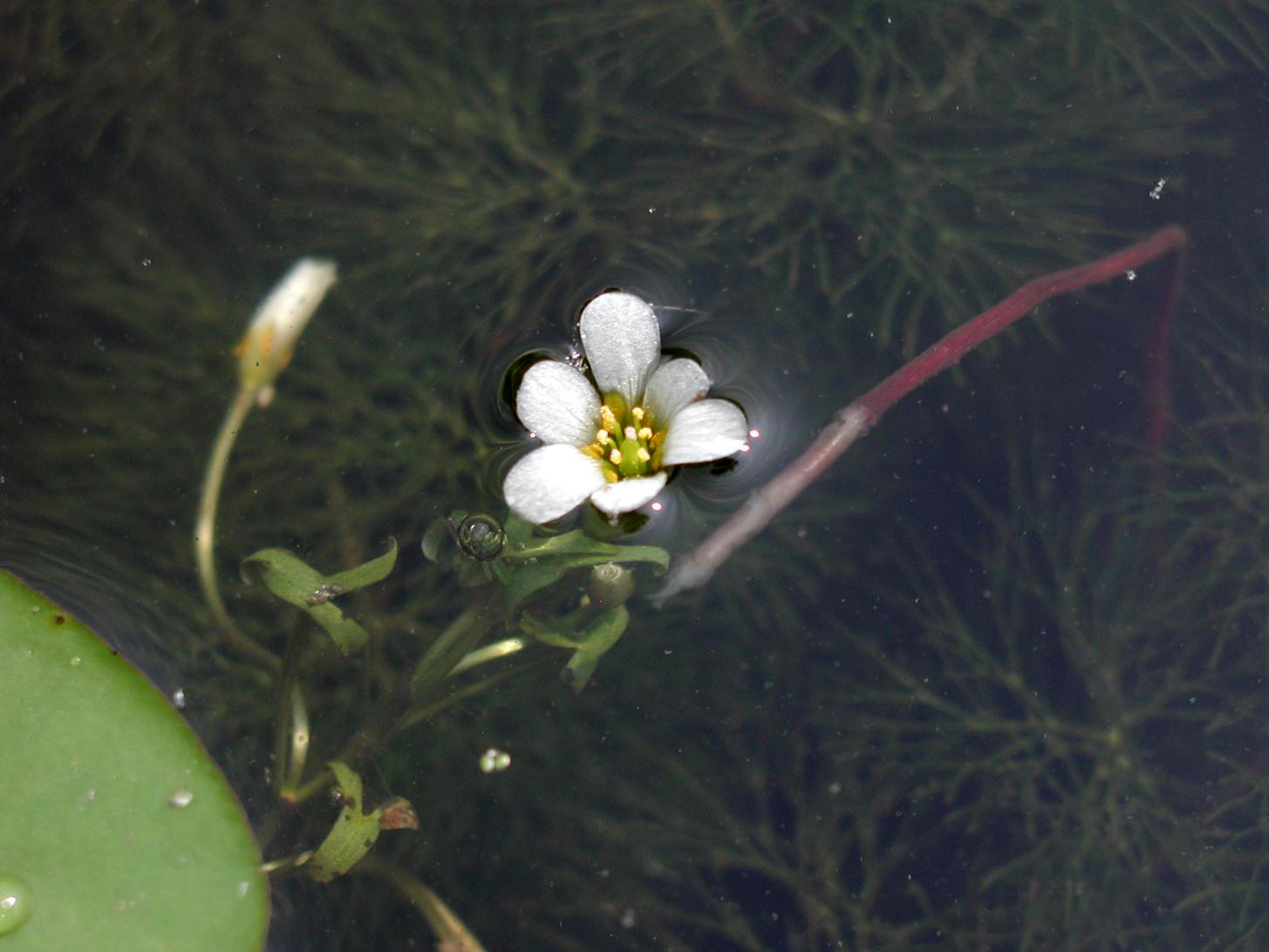
- Flowering Cabomba caroliniana
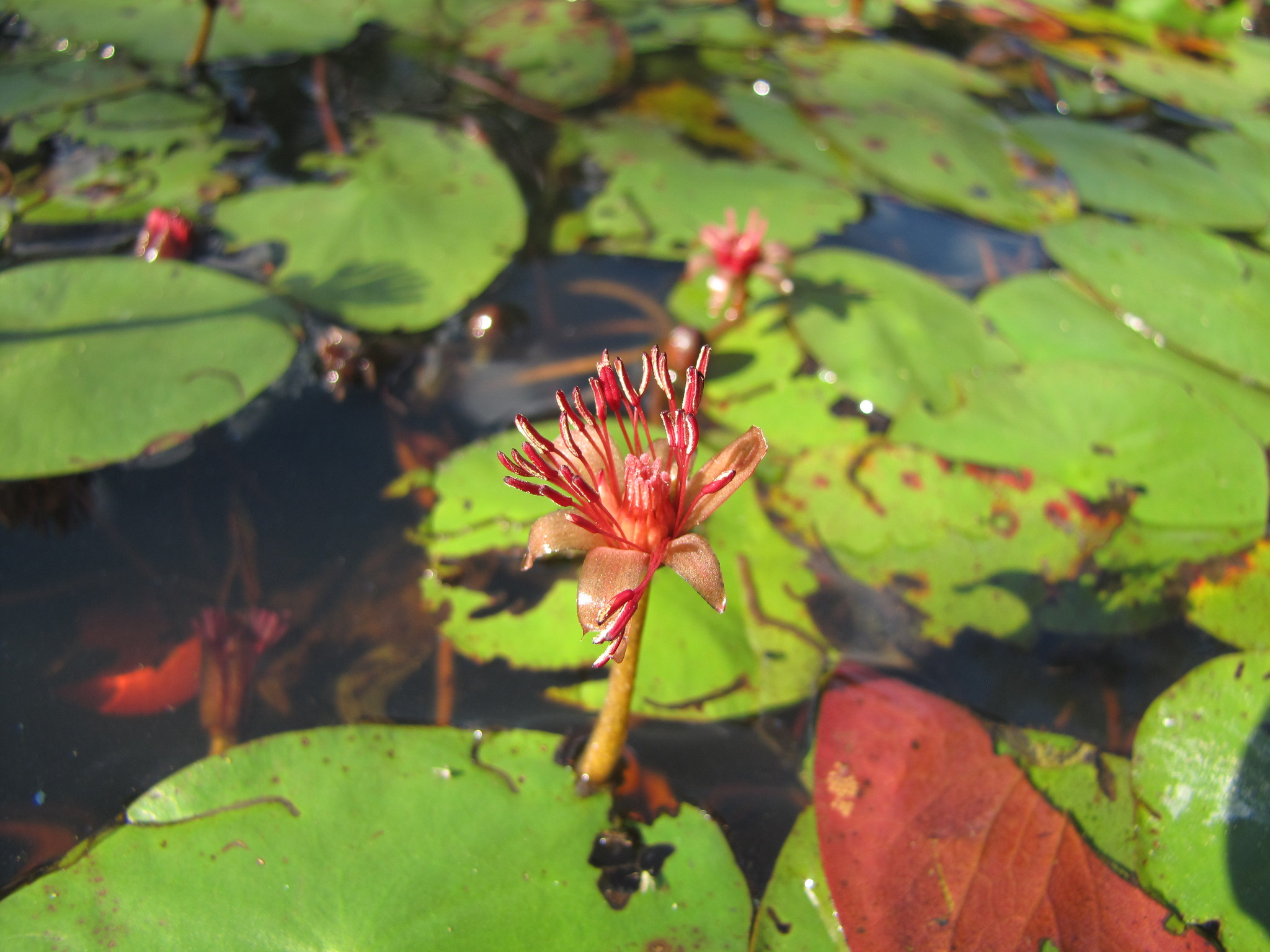
- Flowering Brasenia schreberi

Scientific classification
- Kingdom: Plantae
- Clade: Tracheophytes
- Clade: Angiosperms
- Order: Nymphaeales
- Family: Cabombaceae; Rich. ex A.Rich.

Type genus
- Cabomba Aubl.

Genera
- Brasenia Schreb.; Cabomba Aubl.; †Pluricarpellatia Mohr et al.; †Scutifolium David W.Taylor, G.J.Brenner et S.H.Basha; †Brasenites Wang et Dilcher; †Garasbahia Krassilov et Bacchia

Synonyms
- Hydropeltidaceae (DC.) Dumort.

= Cabombaceae =

Cabombaceae Temporal range: 115–0 Ma (likely) Mid-Cretaceous–Present

Family of flowering plants

The Cabombaceae are a family of aquatic, herbaceous flowering plants. A common name for its species is water shield. The family is recognised as distinct in the Angiosperm Phylogeny Group IV system (2016). The family consists of two genera of aquatic plants, Brasenia and Cabomba, totalling six species.

== Description ==
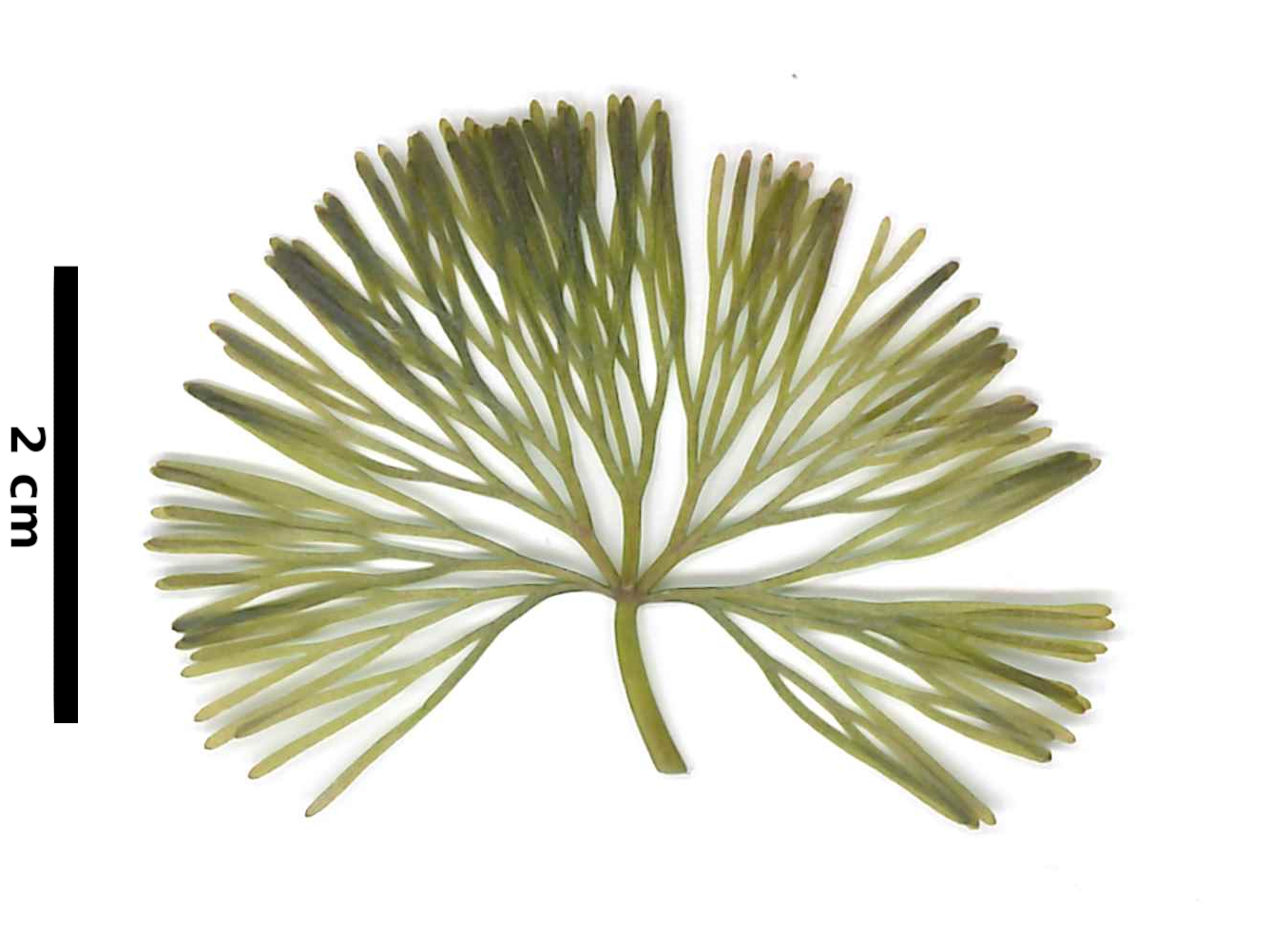
Submerged leaf of Cabomba caroliniana A.Gray with scale bar (2 cm) on a white background

=== Vegetative characteristics ===
Cabombaceae are perennial, rhizomatous, aquatic herbs with slender, branched rhizomes and adventitious roots. The leaves are whorled, alternate, or opposite. Both floating and submerged leaves are produced.

=== Generative characteristics ===
The solitary, pedunculate, bisexual, chasmogamous, actinomorphic, inodorous flowers float on the water surface or extend beyond it. The gynoecium consists of (1–)2–18 free carpels. The indehiscent, follicle-like or achene-like fruit bears 1–3 seeds.

== Distribution ==
The Cabombaceae are all aquatic, living in still or slow-moving waters of temperate and tropical North and South America, Europe, Asia, Africa, and Australia. Although found on all continents but Antarctica, the plants tend to grow in relatively restricted ranges.

== Fossil record ==
The family has an extensive fossil record from the Cretaceous with plants that exhibit affinities to either the Cabombaceae or Nymphaeaceae occurring in the Early Cretaceous.

One such likely Cretaceous member is the genus Pluricarpellatia, found in rocks 115 million years old in what is now Brazil. Scutifolium jordanicum David W.Taylor, G.J.Brenner et S.H.Basha has been described from the Lower Cretaceous of Jordan. Garasbahia flexuosa Krassilov et Bachia has been described from the mid-Cretaceous of Morocco.

== Taxonomy ==
=== Publication ===
The family Cabombaceae Rich. ex A.Rich. was first published in 1822 by Louis Claude Richard, but initial description did not satisfy the requirements for valid publications. The family then was validated by Achille Richard.

=== Taxonomic history ===
The APG system of 1998 included this family in the water lily family Nymphaeaceae, as did the APG II system, of 2003 (optionally). The APG III and APG IV systems of classification separated the family Cabombaceae from the family Nymphaeaceae. The family is part of the order Nymphaeales, which is one of the most basal flowering plant lineages.
