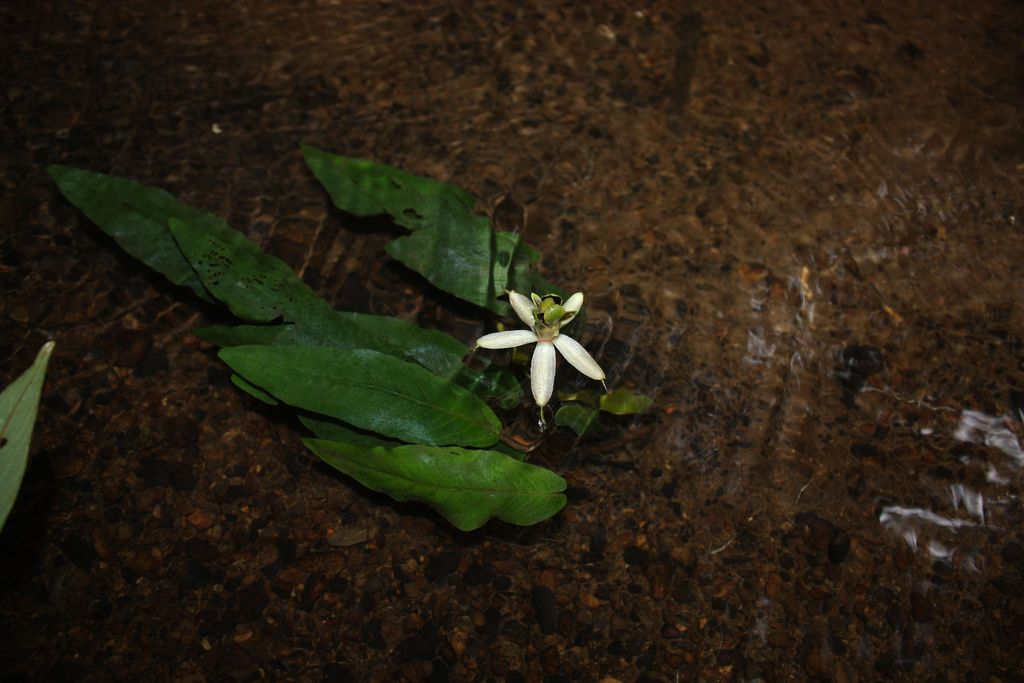
- Barclaya longifolia in its natural habitat Thailand with emergent chasmogamous flower

Conservation status
- Least Concern (IUCN 3.1)

Scientific classification
- Kingdom: Plantae
- Clade: Tracheophytes
- Clade: Angiosperms
- Order: Nymphaeales
- Family: Nymphaeaceae
- Genus: Barclaya
- Species: B. longifolia

Binomial name
- Barclaya longifolia Wall.

Synonyms
- Hydrostemma longifolium (Wall.) Mabb.; Barclaya oblonga Wall.; Barclaya pierreana Thorel ex Gagnep.

= Barclaya longifolia =

Species of perennial aquatic plant

Barclaya longifolia is a species of perennial aquatic plant native to the region of Indo-China to Northwest Peninsular Malaysia.

== Description ==
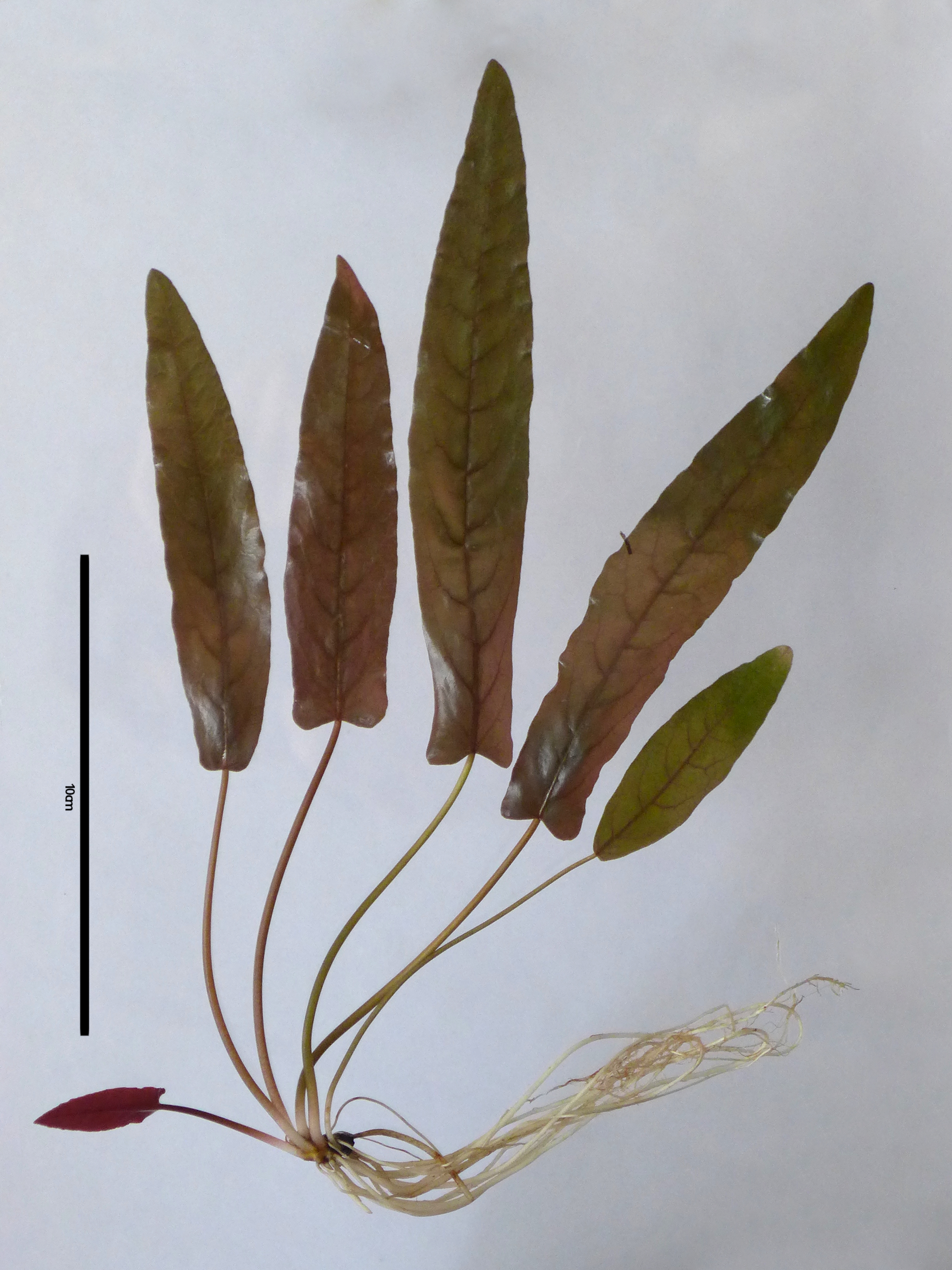
Young Barclaya longifolia Wall. specimen with scale bar (10 cm)

=== Vegetative characteristics ===
Barclaya longifolia is a submerged, perennial, aquatic herb with ovoid, tuberous, stoloniferous, 2-3 cm long, and 0.5-1.5 cm wide rhizomes. The linear-lanceolate, 12-30 cm long and 2-5 cm wide leaves with an obtuse apex, and a cordate base have an undulate margin. The abaxial leaf surface displays red colouration. The petioles are 6-25 cm long.

=== Generative characteristics ===
The submerged and cleistogamous, or emerged and chasmogamous, 4-6 cm wide flowers are attached to 5-30 cm long peduncles with numerous trichomes. The sepals are 1.5-2.5 cm long, and 0.5-0.6 cm wide. The syncarpous, inferior gynoecium consists of 8-14 carpels. The globose, reddish green to whitish, 1-2 cm wide fruit bears 1mm long, and 0.5 mm wide, echinate, brownish red, globose seeds without an arillus.

=== Cytology ===
The diploid chromosome count is 2n = 36. The chloroplast genome is 158359 bp long.

== Reproduction ==
=== Vegetative reproduction ===
The rhizomes are stoloniferous.

=== Generative reproduction ===
Barclaya longifolia can produce autogamous, submerged, cleistogamous flowers, as well as emergent chasmogamous flowers.

== Taxonomy ==
It was first described by Nathaniel Wallich in 1827. It is the type species of its genus. The type specimen was collected by Wallich in Rangoon, Myanmar in August 1826.

=== Etymology ===
The specific epithet (longifolia) is derived from the Latin words longus meaning "long" and folium meaning "leaf".

== Conservation ==
The IUCN conservation status is least concern (LC). It may be endangered in Peninsular Malaysia. In India, it is a rare species.

== Ecology ==
=== Habitat ===
It occurs in quickly flowing rivers, streams, and stagnant pools. Disturbance of the substrate by wild boar may be beneficial for the establishment of Barclaya longifolia seedlings in their natural habitat.

== Use ==
In Laos, Barclaya longifolia is used for its edible leaves.

== Cultivation ==
It is a popular aquarium plant. It can be easily cultivated in a mixture of pH-neutral, loamy and mineral soils at temperatures of 26-29°C.
