= Monetianthus =

Monetianthus Temporal range: Early Cretaceous (Aptian-Albian)

Scientific classification
- Kingdom: Plantae
- Clade: Tracheophytes
- Clade: Angiosperms
- Order: Nymphaeales
- Family: Nymphaeaceae
- Genus: †Monetianthus; Friis et al.
- Species: †M. mirus

Binomial name
- †Monetianthus mirus Friis et al.

Species of aquatic plant

Monetianthus mirus was a species of fossil plant, which occurred in the early Cretaceous period of Portugal.

== Description ==
=== Generative characteristics ===
Monetianthus mirus had small, bisexual, actinomorphic flowers with 9-10 tepals. The androecium consists of 20 stamens. The pollen grains are monocolpate and reticulate. The gynoecium consists of 12 syncarpous carpels. The ovules are anatropous.

== Taxonomy ==
=== Publication ===
It was published by Else Marie Friis, Kaj Raunsgaard Pedersen, Maria von Balthazar, Guido W. Grimm, and Peter Robert Crane in 2009.

=== Type specimen ===
The type specimen was collected in Vale de Agua in western Portugal.

=== Position within Nymphaeales ===
It is placed in the family Nymphaeaceae. Alternatively, it has been proposed to include this genus in a newly described family Monetianthaceae Doweld.

== Etymology ==
The generic name Monetianthus honours Claude Monet. The specific epithet mirus, from the Latin mirus, means wonderful, remarkable, or extraordinary.
