= Barclaya hirta =

Scientific classification
- Kingdom: Plantae
- Clade: Tracheophytes
- Clade: Angiosperms
- Order: Nymphaeales
- Family: Nymphaeaceae
- Genus: Barclaya
- Species: B. hirta

Binomial name
- Barclaya hirta (Kurz ex Teijsm. & Binn.) Miq.
- Barclaya hirta is endemic to Sumatra, Indonesia

Synonyms
- Nymphaea hirta Kurz ex Teijsm. & Binn.

Species of perennial aquatic plant

Barclaya hirta is a species of aquatic plant endemic to Sumatra, Indonesia.

== Description ==
=== Vegetative characteristics ===
Barclaya hirta is an aquatic plant with villous, stoloniferous, slim, 2–5 cm long, and 0.5–1 cm wide rhizomes. The 10-15 petiolate, rounded to ovate leaves with an obtuse apex are 5–10 cm long, and 4–8 cm wide. The petioles are 5–20 cm long. The leaves exhibit brownish pubescence.

=== Generative characteristics ===
The nocturnal, 4 cm wide flower is attached to a 5–20 cm long peduncle. The outer tepals are 2.5–3 cm long, and the 6-8 inner tepals are 2 cm long. The androecium consists of 30-40 stamens. The stigmatic cup has 7-9 carpellary appendages. Fruits were not observed.

=== Cytology ===
The diploid chromosome count is 2n = 36.

== Reproduction ==
=== Vegetative reproduction ===
It can reproduce vegetatively through the formation of stolons.

=== Generative reproduction ===
The flowers are likely nocturnal.

== Taxonomy ==
It was first described as Nymphaea hirta Kurz ex Teijsm. & Binn. by Wilhelm Sulpiz Kurz but validly published by Johannes Elias Teijsmann and Simon Binnendijk in 1864. Later, it was transferred to the genus Barclaya Wall. as Barclaya hirta (Kurz ex Teijsm. & Binn.) Miq. by Friedrich Anton Wilhelm Miquel in 1870. The type specimen was collected by Johannes Elias Teijsmann in Sumatra, Indonesia.

=== Etymology ===
The specific epithet hirta, from the Latin hirtus, means hairy.

== Conservation ==
It is classified as data deficient (DD) under the IUCN criteria.

== Ecology ==
=== Habitat ===
It occurs in small streams.
