= Barclaya kunstleri =

Scientific classification
- Kingdom: Plantae
- Clade: Tracheophytes
- Clade: Angiosperms
- Order: Nymphaeales
- Family: Nymphaeaceae
- Genus: Barclaya
- Species: B. kunstleri

Binomial name
- Barclaya kunstleri (King) Ridl.

Synonyms
- Hydrostemma kunstleri (King) B.C.Stone; Barclaya motleyi var. kunstleri King

Species of perennial aquatic plant

Barclaya kunstleri is a species of aquatic plant native to Peninsular Malaysia, and Singapore.

== Description ==
=== Vegetative characteristics ===
Barclaya kunstleri is an aquatic plant with slim, stoloniferous, villous, 2–4 cm long, and 0.5 cm wide rhizomes. The stolons can exceed 50 cm in length. The petiolate, ovate to circular, bright green leaves are 5–10 cm long and 6–10 cm wide. The green, pubescent to glabrous petioles are 5–10 cm long.

=== Generative characteristics ===
The nocturnal, 5–6 cm wide flowers are attached to 10–20 cm long peduncles. The outer tepals are 2.5–3.0 cm long, and the 3-4 inner tepals are 1 cm long. The flowers have 20-30 anthers. The stigmatic cup has 8-10 carpellary appendages. The globose to elongate, 1 cm long fruit bears echinate, ellipsoid, 1 mm long, and 0.5 mm wide seeds.

=== Cytology ===
The diploid chromosome count is 2n = 36. The chloroplast genome is 160051 bp long.

== Reproduction ==
=== Vegetative reproduction ===
It can reproduce vegetatively through the formation of stolons.

== Taxonomy ==
It was first described as Barclaya motleyi var. kunstleri King by George King in 1889. Later, it was elevated to the status of a separate species Barclaya kunstleri (King) Ridl. by Henry Nicholas Ridley in 1922. The type specimen was collected by Hermann H. Kunstler (1837-1887) in West Malaysia in July 1885.

=== Classification status ===
The status of this species is disputed. It is rejected by some, but accepted by others.

=== Etymology ===
The specific epithet kunstleri honours Hermann H. Kunstler, who worked for George King as a plant collector in Perak, Malaysia and collected the type specimen.

== Conservation ==
It is classified as data deficient (DD) under the IUCN criteria.

== Ecology ==
=== Habitat ===
It occurs in small mountain streams with sandy, or muddy substrates.
