= Pluricarpellatia =

Pluricarpellatia Temporal range: 145–100.5 Ma Early Cretaceous

Scientific classification
- Kingdom: Plantae
- Clade: Tracheophytes
- Clade: Angiosperms
- Order: Nymphaeales
- Family: Cabombaceae
- Genus: †Pluricarpellatia; B. Mohr, Bernardes-de-Oliveira & David W. Taylor
- Species: †P. peltata

Binomial name
- †Pluricarpellatia peltata B. Mohr, Bernardes-de-Oliveira & David W. Taylor

Species of aquatic plant

Pluricarpellatia peltata was a species of herbaceous aquatic plant, which occurred in the early Cretaceous period of Brazil.

== Description ==
=== Vegetative characteristics ===
Pluricarpellatia peltata was an aquatic, rhizomatous, herbaceous plant with 5 mm wide rhizomes and 0.3-1.3 mm wide roots. The plant could exceed 25 cm in length. The thin, petiolate leaves have a smooth margin. The petioles were 5 cm long, and 3 mm wide.

=== Generative characteristics ===
The pedunculate, 2 cm wide flowers had up to 17 cm long peduncles. The gynoecium consists of 6-12 carpels.

== Taxonomy ==
=== Publication ===
It was published by Barbara Adelheid Rosina Mohr, Mary Elizabeth Bernardes de Oliveira and David Winship Taylor in 2008.

=== Type specimen ===
The type specimen was collected by Barbara Adelheid Rosina Mohr, Mary Elizabeth Bernardes de Oliveira and David Winship Taylor South of Nova Olinda, Brazil in the Crato Formation of the Araripe Basin. It is stored in the Natural History Museum, Berlin, Germany.

=== Position within Nymphaeales ===
It was likely a basal member of the family Cabombaceae.

== Etymology ==
The generic name Pluricarpellatia references the many carpels present in the flowers. The specific epithet peltata refers to the peltate leaves.
