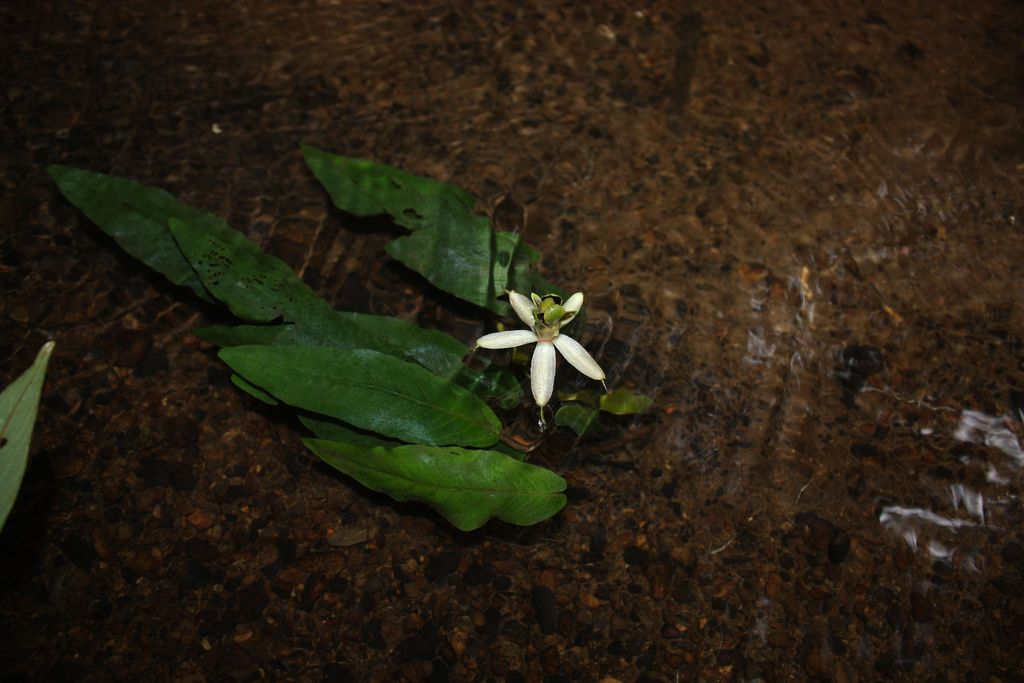

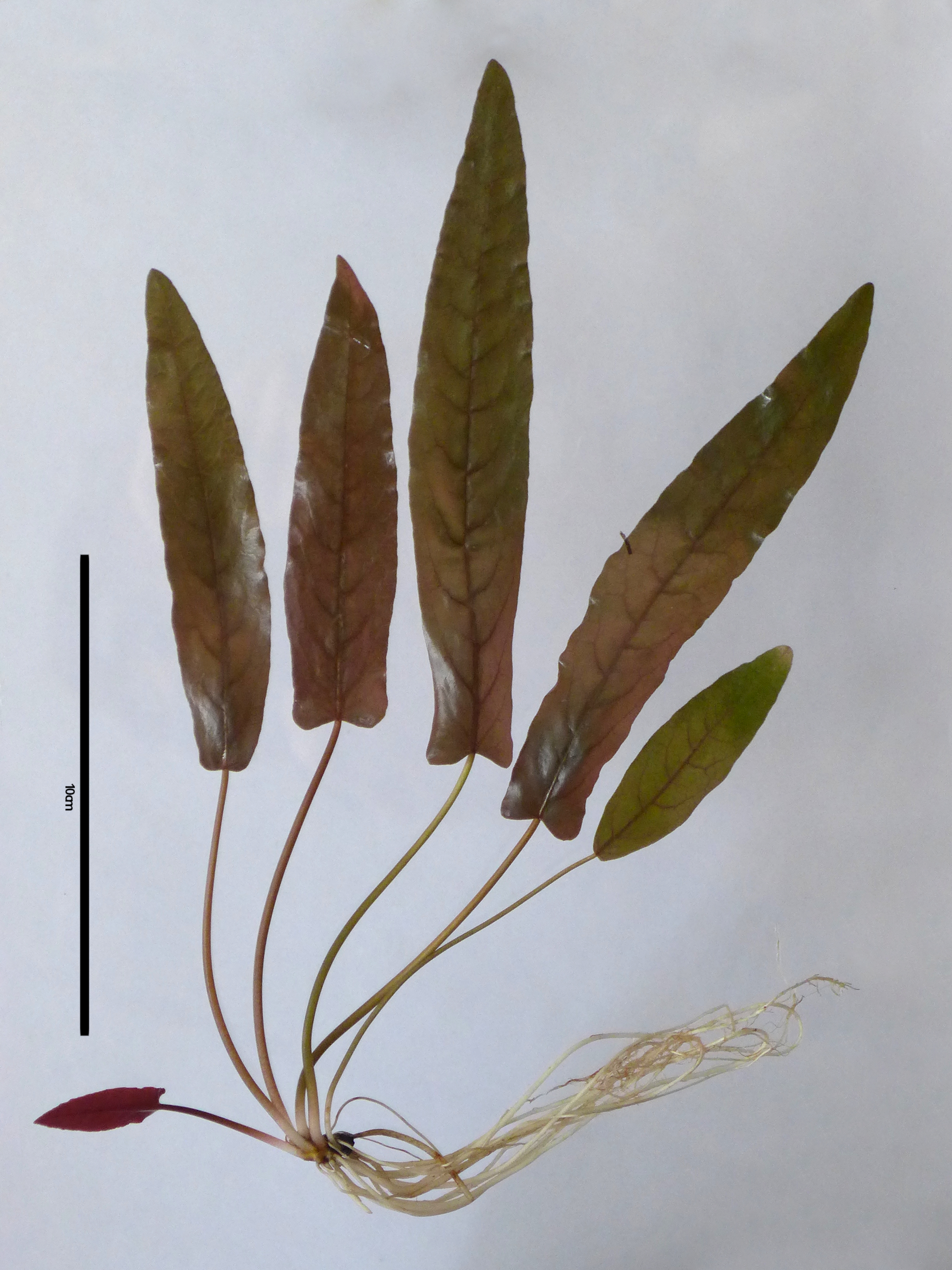
- Barclaya longifolia

Scientific classification
- Kingdom: Plantae
- Clade: Tracheophytes
- Clade: Angiosperms
- Order: Nymphaeales
- Family: Nymphaeaceae
- Genus: Barclaya; Wall.

Type species
- Barclaya longifolia Wall.

Synonyms
- Hydrostemma Wall. ex Taylor & Phillips

= Barclaya =

Genus of aquatic plants

Barclaya is a genus of eight species of flowering plants of the family Nymphaeaceae. Barclaya are aquatic plants native to tropical Asia. The genus was named in honour of the American-born English brewer and patron of science Robert Barclay.

== Description ==
=== Vegetative characteristics ===
Its species are perennial, aquatic, rhizomatous herbs with slender, horizontal, villous-pubescent, creeping or tuberous, often stoloniferous rhizomes. The petiolate leaves are mostly submerged and do not float on the water surface. The linear, oblong, or suborbicular lamina with a cordate base has an entire margin.

=== Generative characteristics ===
The solitary, pedunculate, sumberged or emerged, bisexual, often cleistogamous flowers have 4–5 hypogynous outer tepals, and 8–20 inner tepals, which are basally fused to a tube. The gynoecium consists of 7–12 fused carpels with curved stigmatic appendages. The globular, irregularly dehiscent 1.0–1.5(–2.0) cm wide fruit, which is enclosed in persistent sepals and petals, bears globose, echinate seeds.

=== Cytology ===
The diploid chromosome count is 2n = 36.

== Taxonomy ==
The genus Barclaya Wall. was first published by Nathaniel Wallich in 1827 with Barclaya longifolia Wall. as the type species. Though Hydrostemma is a name that is older than the name Barclaya, having been published 6 months earlier, the name Barclaya has been "conserved" as it was deemed being much better known than Hydrostemma.

=== Species ===
Flower	Species	Distribution
	Barclaya hirta (Kurz ex Teijsm. & Binn.) Miq.	Indonesia, Sumatera
	Barclaya kunstleri (King) Ridl.	Peninsular Malaysia and Singapore
	Barclaya longifolia Wall.	India, Andaman Islands, Myanmar, Thailand, Laos, Cambodia, Vietnam, and Peninsular Malaysia
	Barclaya motleyi Hook.f.	Thailand, peninsular Malaysia, Sumatera, Riau Islands, Sarawak, Kalimantan, Papua, and Papua New Guinea
	Barclaya panchorensis Komala	Malaya Peninsula
	Barclaya rotundifolia M.Hotta	Sarawak, Johore, Malaysia
	Barclaya rugosa Sofiman Othman & N.Jacobsen	Malaya Peninsula
	Barclaya wellyi Wongso, Ipor & N.Jacobsen	Sumatra

=== Rejected classification ===
The separate family Barclayaceae H.L.Li was published in 1955. It has been believed to be separate, due to the extended perianth tube (combined sepals and petals) arising from the top of the ovary and by stamens that are joined basally. However, morphological and genetic studies support the position of Barclaya in the family Nymphaeaceae. A separate order Barclayales Doweld was proposed in 2001.

The accepted placement of Barclaya is within the family Nymphaeaceae of the order Nymphaeales.

== Habitat ==
Within tropical rainforests, Barclaya develops alongside streams or at their fringes. The escalating deforestation across Southeast Asia is causing the habitats to become clouded, endangering Barclaya.

== Conservation ==
The IUCN conservation status of Barclaya longifolia is least concern (LC). The IUCN conservation status of Barclaya motleyi is data deficient (DD).

== Use ==
In Laos, Barclaya longifolia is used for its edible leaves.

== Cultivation ==
Barclaya longifolia is a popular aquarium plant. Under high light conditions the attractive, upright foliage displays green colouration. Under lower light conditions brownish foliage is produced. It easily sets seed in cultivation, if pollen is deposited on the stigma.
