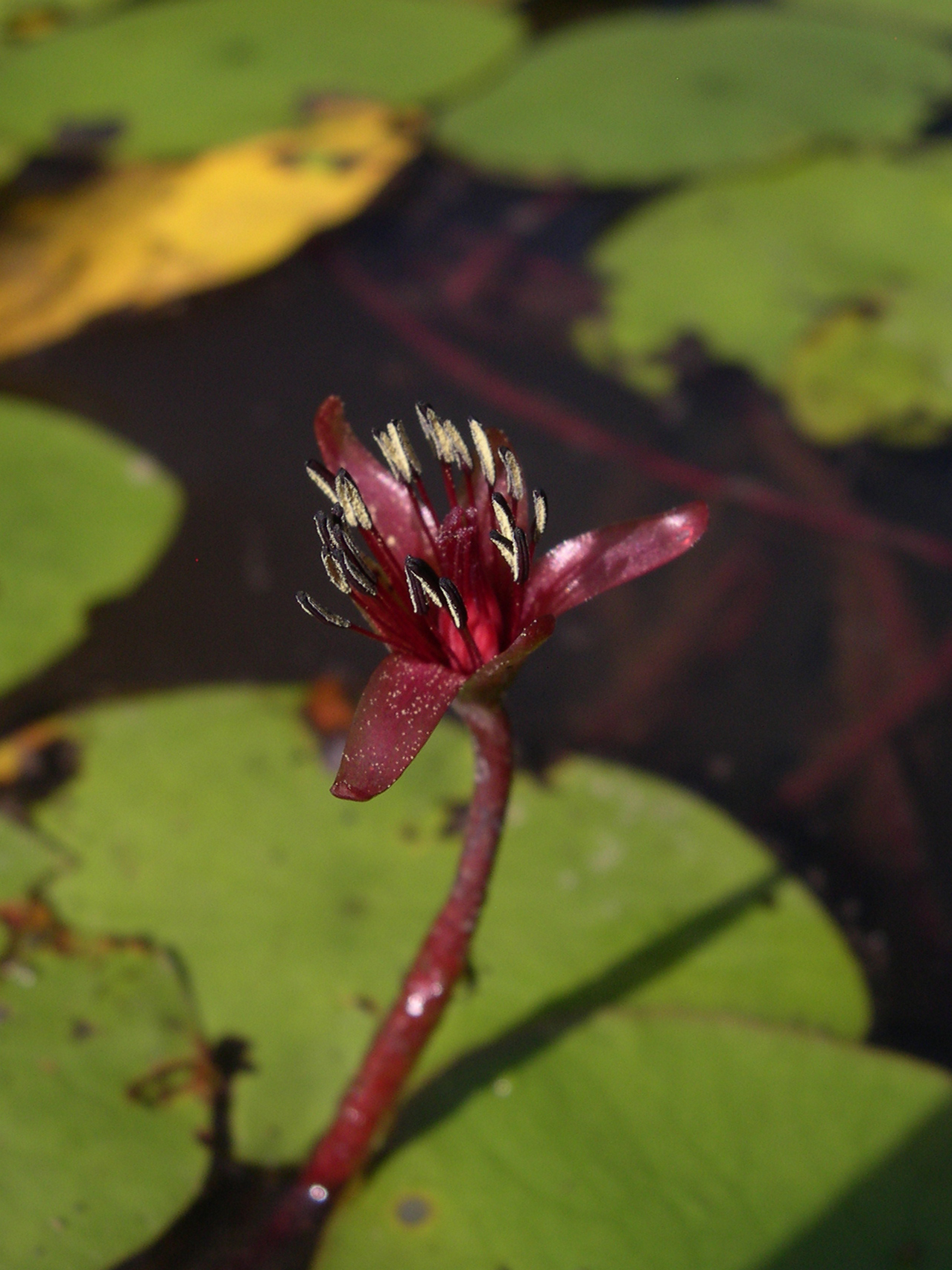

Conservation status
- Least Concern (IUCN 3.1)

- Secure (NatureServe)

Scientific classification
- Kingdom: Plantae
- Clade: Embryophytes
- Clade: Tracheophytes
- Clade: Spermatophytes
- Clade: Angiosperms
- Order: Nymphaeales
- Family: Cabombaceae
- Genus: Brasenia; Schreb.
- Species: B. schreberi

Binomial name
- Brasenia schreberi J.F.Gmel.

Synonyms
- Barteria Welw.; Brasenia hydropeltis Muhl.; Brasenia nymphoides Baill.; Brasenia purpurea (Michx.) Casp.; Brasenia pelta Casp.

= Brasenia =

Genus of aquatic plants

Brasenia is a genus belonging to the family Cabombaceae, consisting of one species, Brasenia schreberi, commonly known as watershield. It is widely distributed in North America, the West Indies, northern South America (Venezuela, Guyana), eastern Asia (China, Japan, Korea, Primorye), Australia, the Indian subcontinent, and parts of Africa.

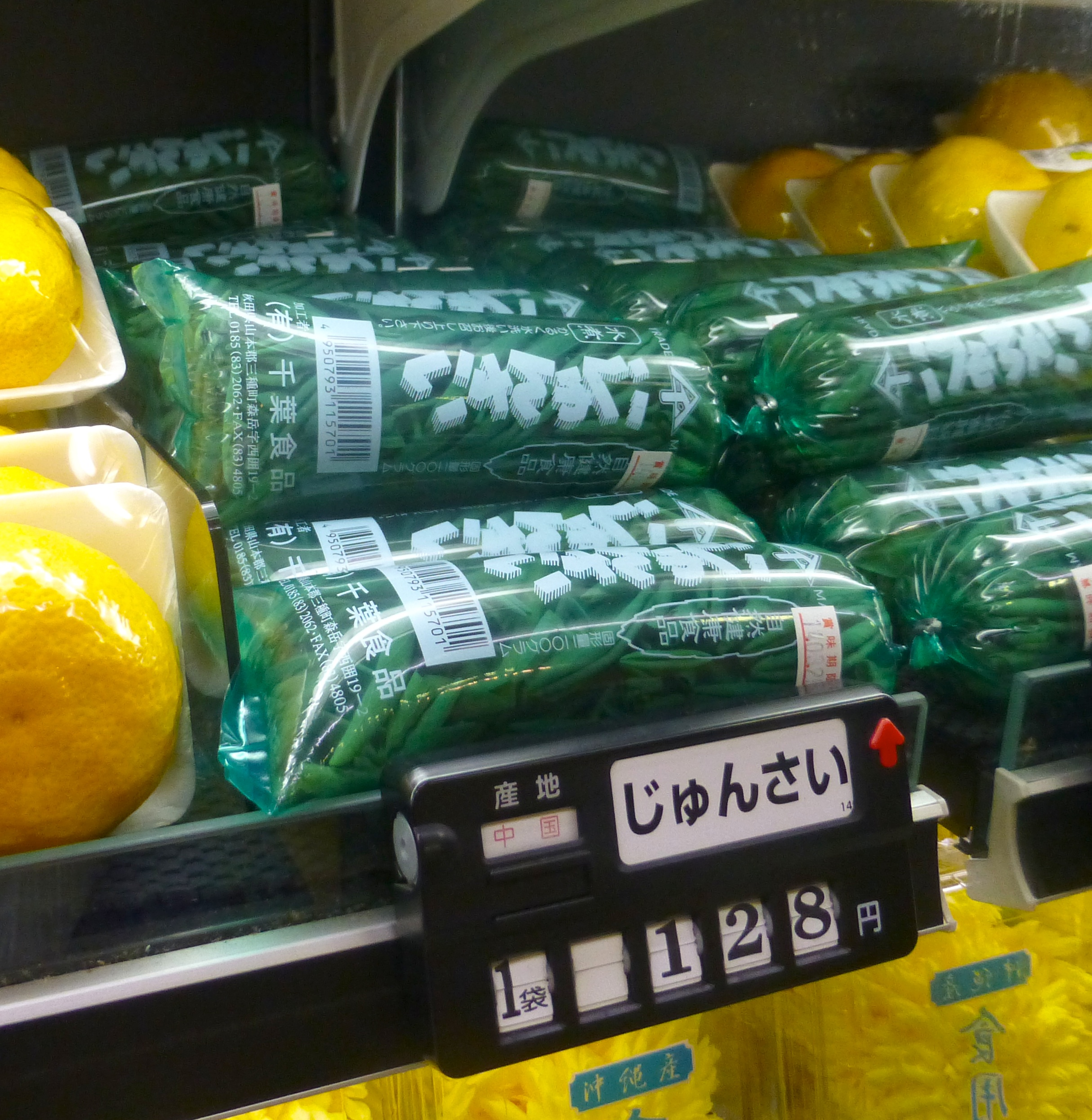
For sale in a Japanese supermarket, 2014

Brasenia is a perennial aquatic plant with floating, peltate leaves and rhizomatous stems. It is identified by its bright green leaves, small purple flowers that bloom from June through September, and a thick mucilage that covers all of the underwater organs, including the underside of the leaves, stems, and developing buds. This mucilage may be an anti-herbivore defence trait, perhaps to deter snail grazing. It grows in shallow water of lakes, rivers and beaver ponds, particularly those with somewhat acidic water.

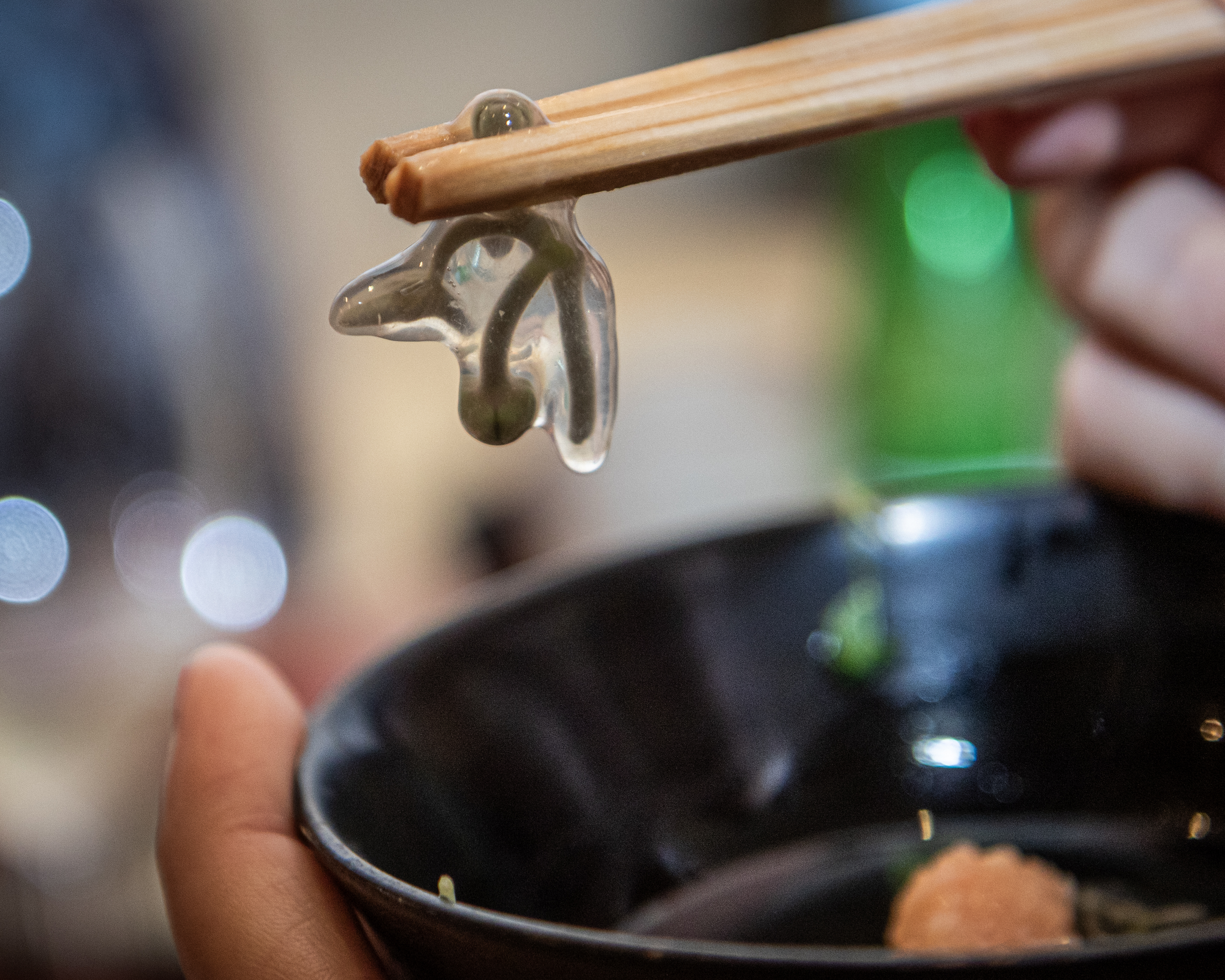
Junsai with visible mucilage.

== Characteristics ==
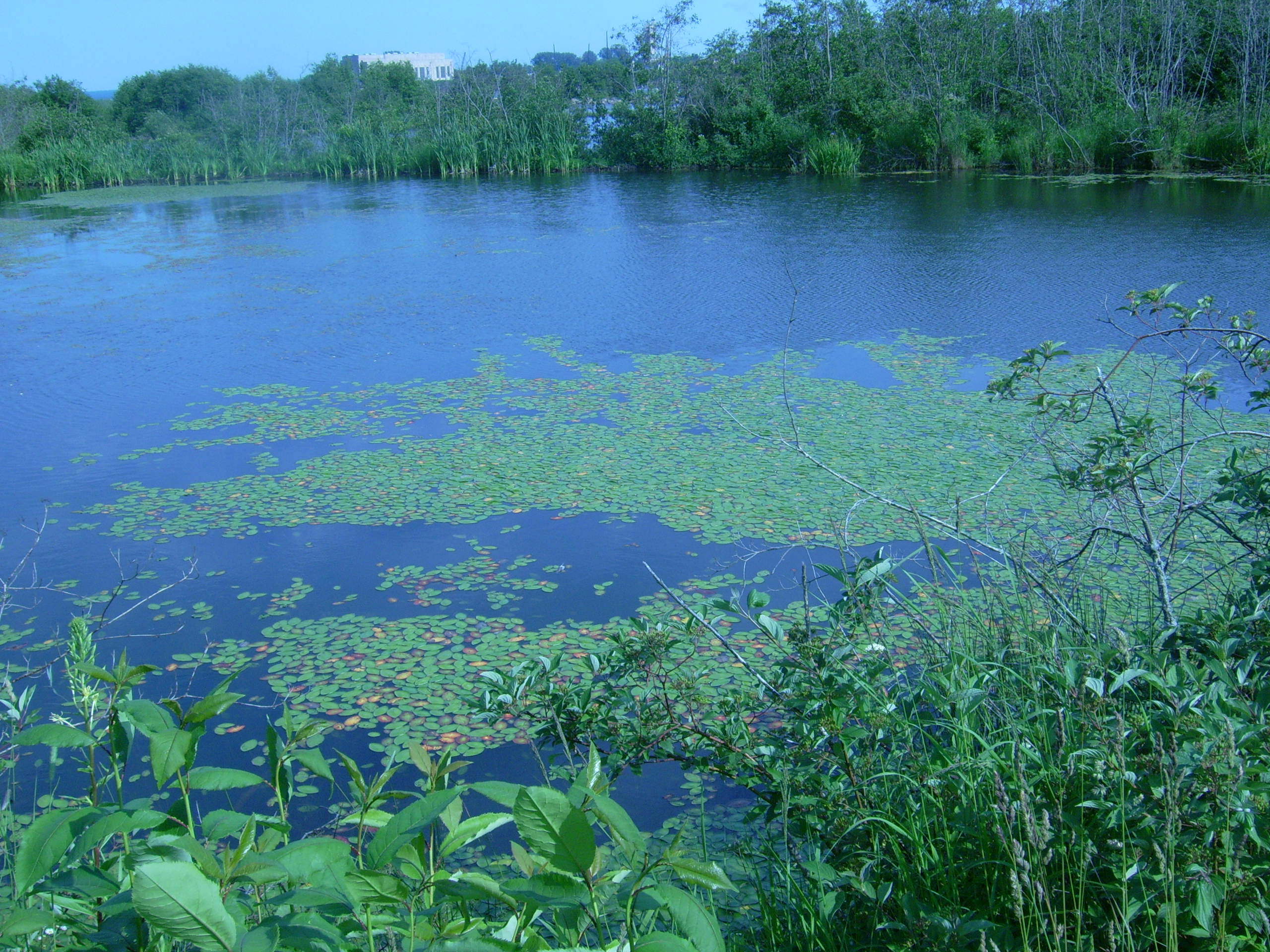
Ponds along Attikamek Trail at Sault Ste. Marie Canal

Brasenia exhibits wind pollination. The flowers have a two-day blooming period. On the first day, the functionally female, or pistillate flower, extends above the surface of the water and exposes the receptive stigmas. The flower then recedes below the water surface and on the following day emerges as a functionally male, or staminate flower. It is elevated higher than on the previous day and the anther-bearing filaments are extended beyond the female carpels. The anthers dehisce, releasing the pollen, and the flower is then withdrawn below the water where the fruit develops.

== Cytology ==
The chloroplast genome is 158951 base pairs (bp) long. The mitochondrial genome is composed of six parts ranging from 110220 bp to 628257 bp in size. The complete mitogenome is 1.49 mega–base-pair (Mb) long. The nuclear genome is 1170.4 Mb long.

== Uses ==
Brasenia is cultivated as a vegetable in China (where it is known as chúncài 莼菜) and where it is used in Hangzhou in the well-known local speciality "West Lake Water Shield Soup" and in Japan.

The mucilage it produces has been found to have anti-algal and anti-bacterial properties that may be useful as a natural weed control.

== History ==
Species of Brasenia occurred during the interglacial of Europe, but like many other aquatic plant species and genera, it does not occur there now.

== Name ==
Brasenia schreberi has the common name watershield.

The genus may commemorate the surgeon and Moravian missionary Christoph Brasen (1738-1774), who was the first superintendent of the Moravian mission at Nain in Labrador.

== Conservation ==
It is classified as least concern (LC) by The IUCN Red List. It is classified as vulnerable (VU) in South Korea. The NatureServe conservation status is G5 Secure. Under the Flora and Fauna Guarantee Act 1988, it is categorised as Critically Endangered (CR).

== See also ==
- List of vegetables
