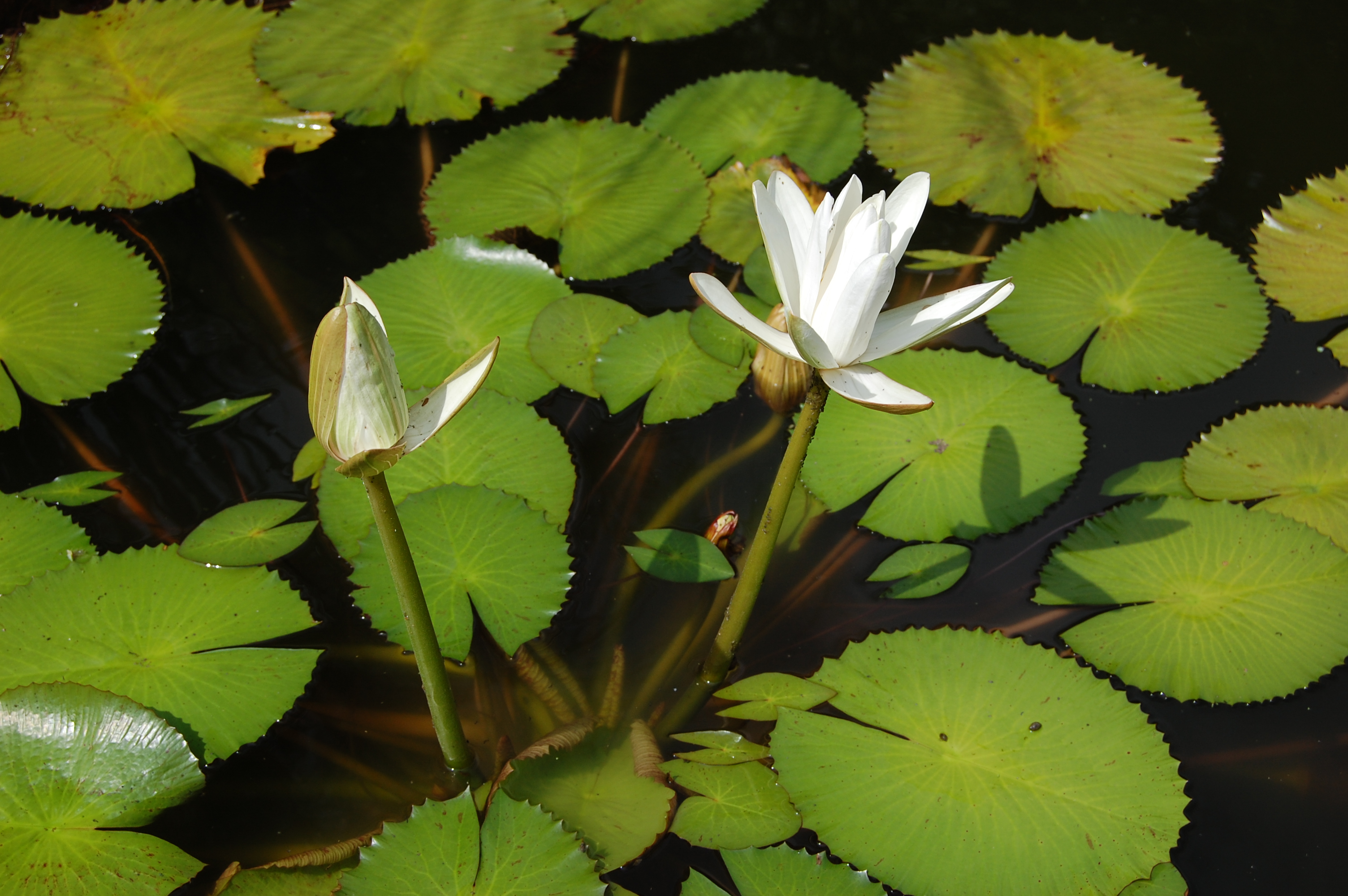
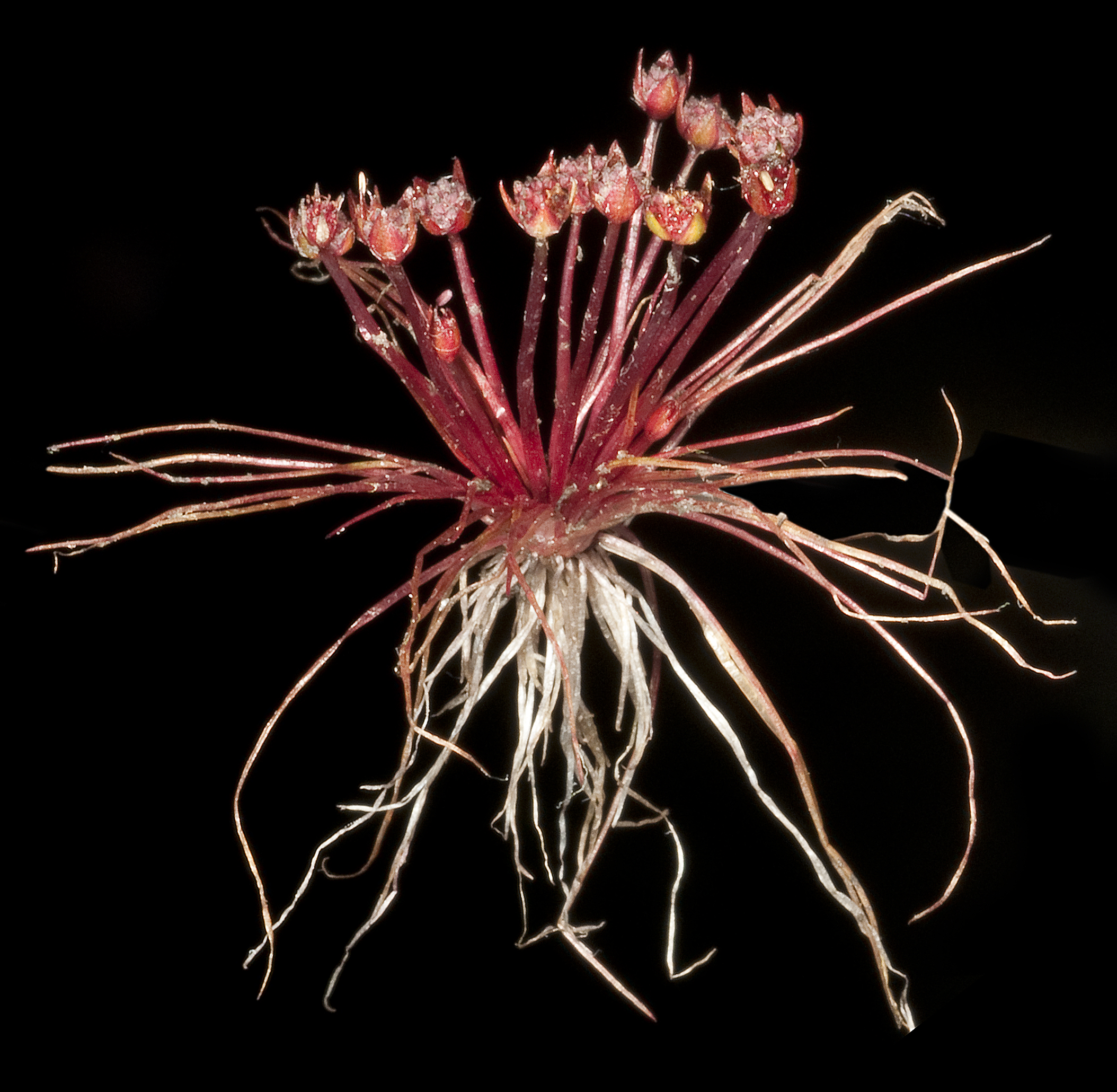
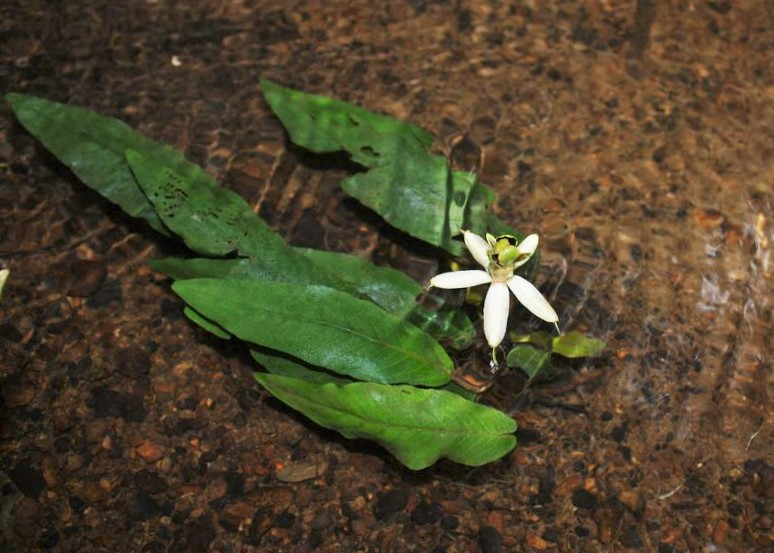
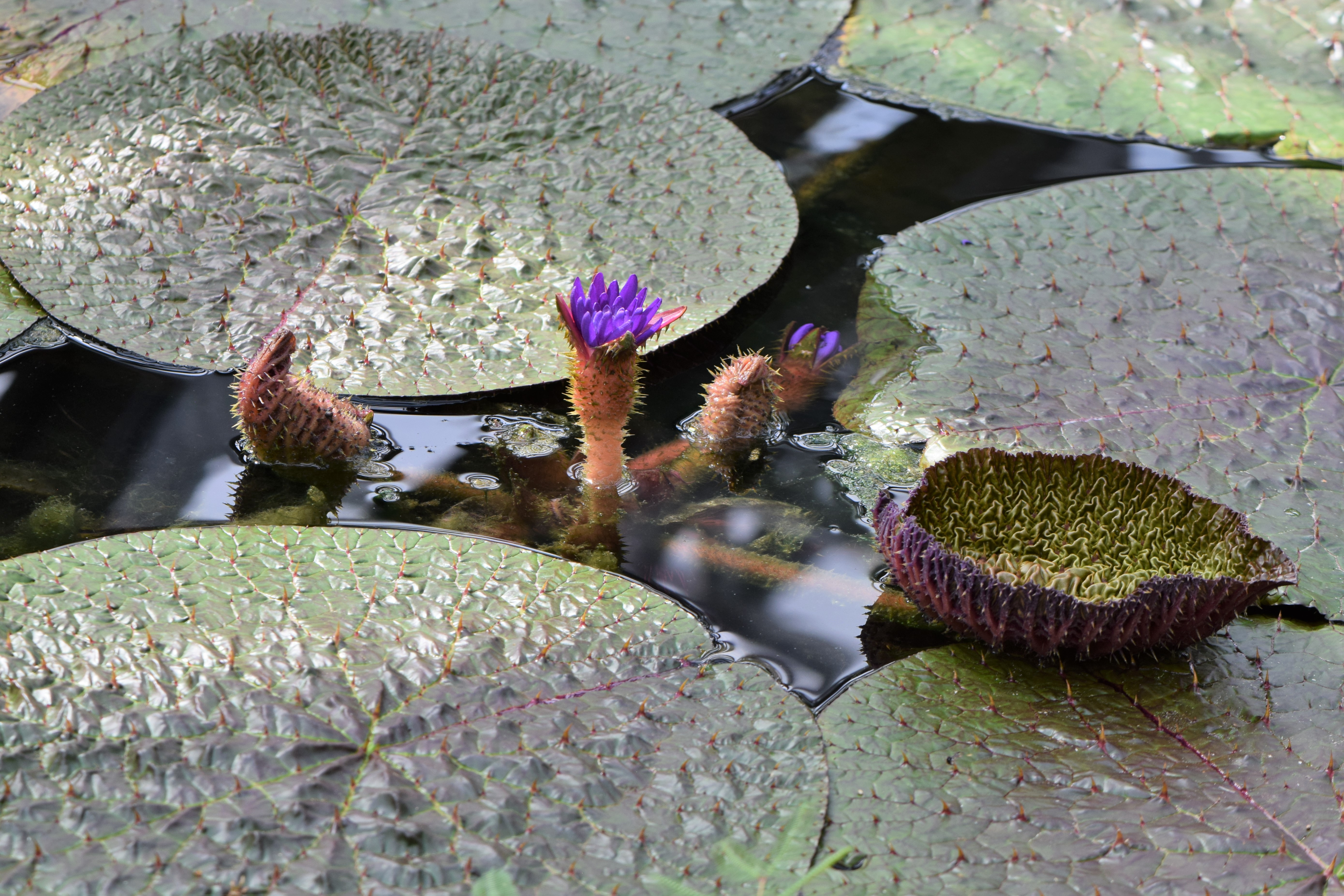
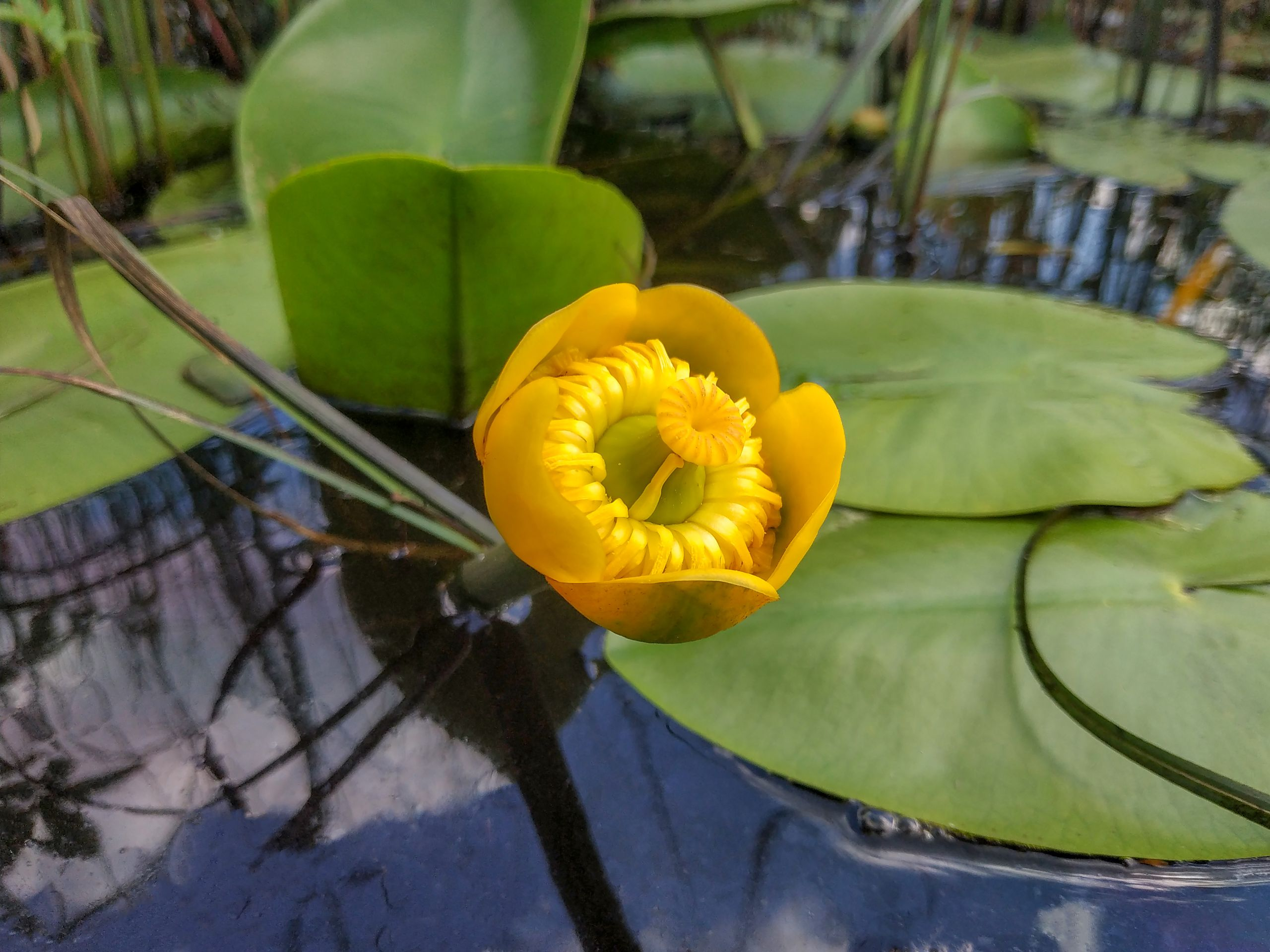
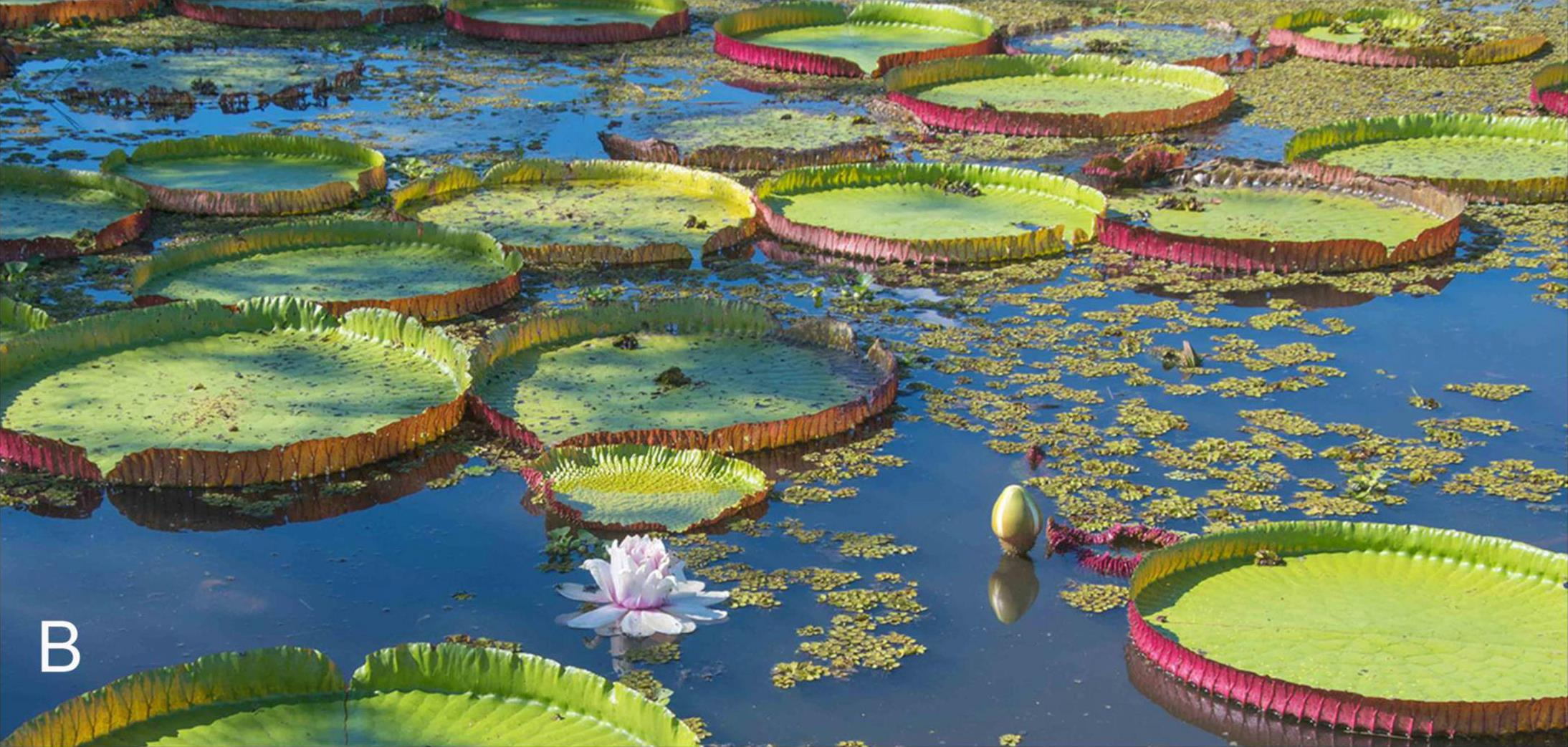
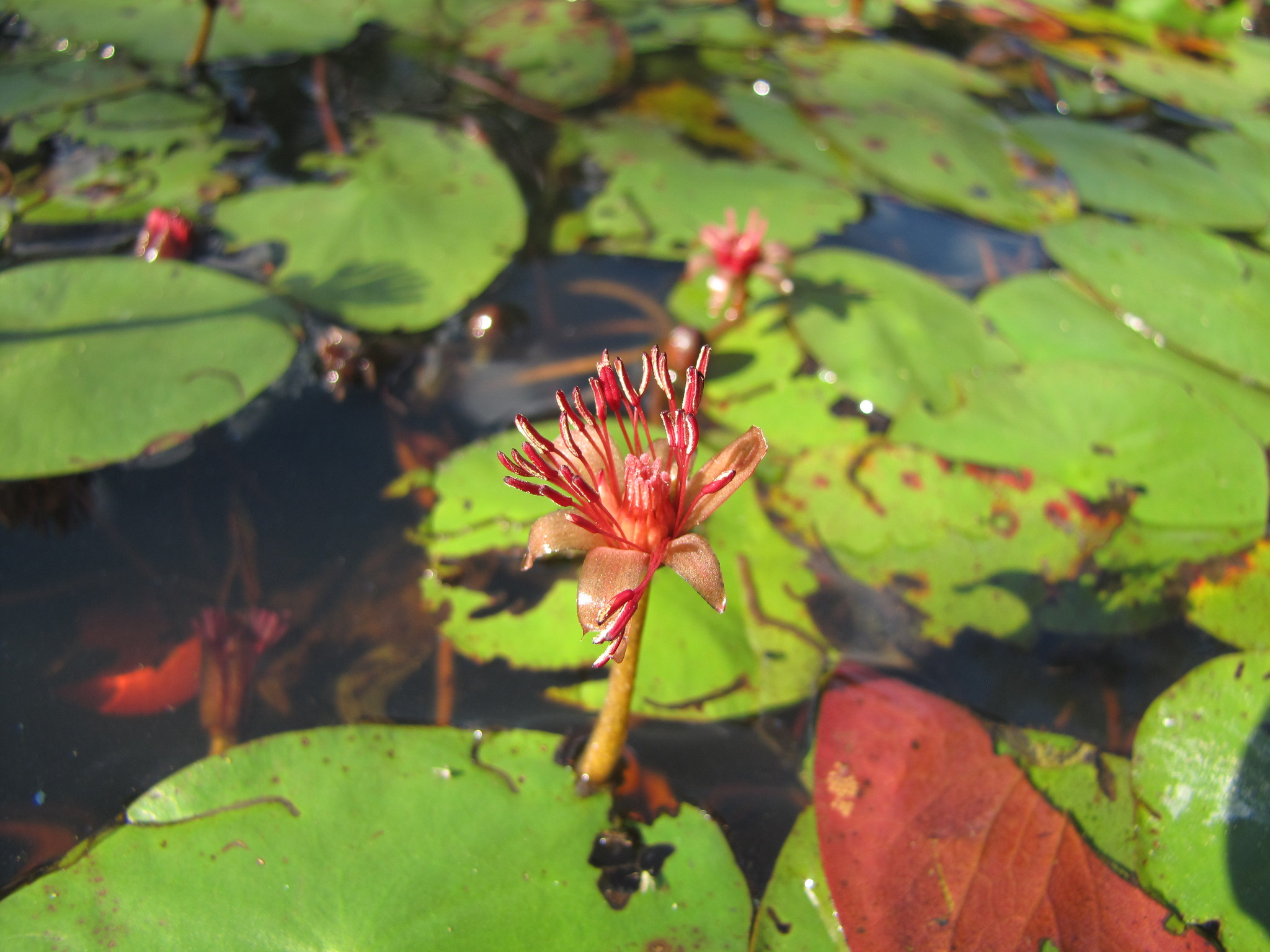
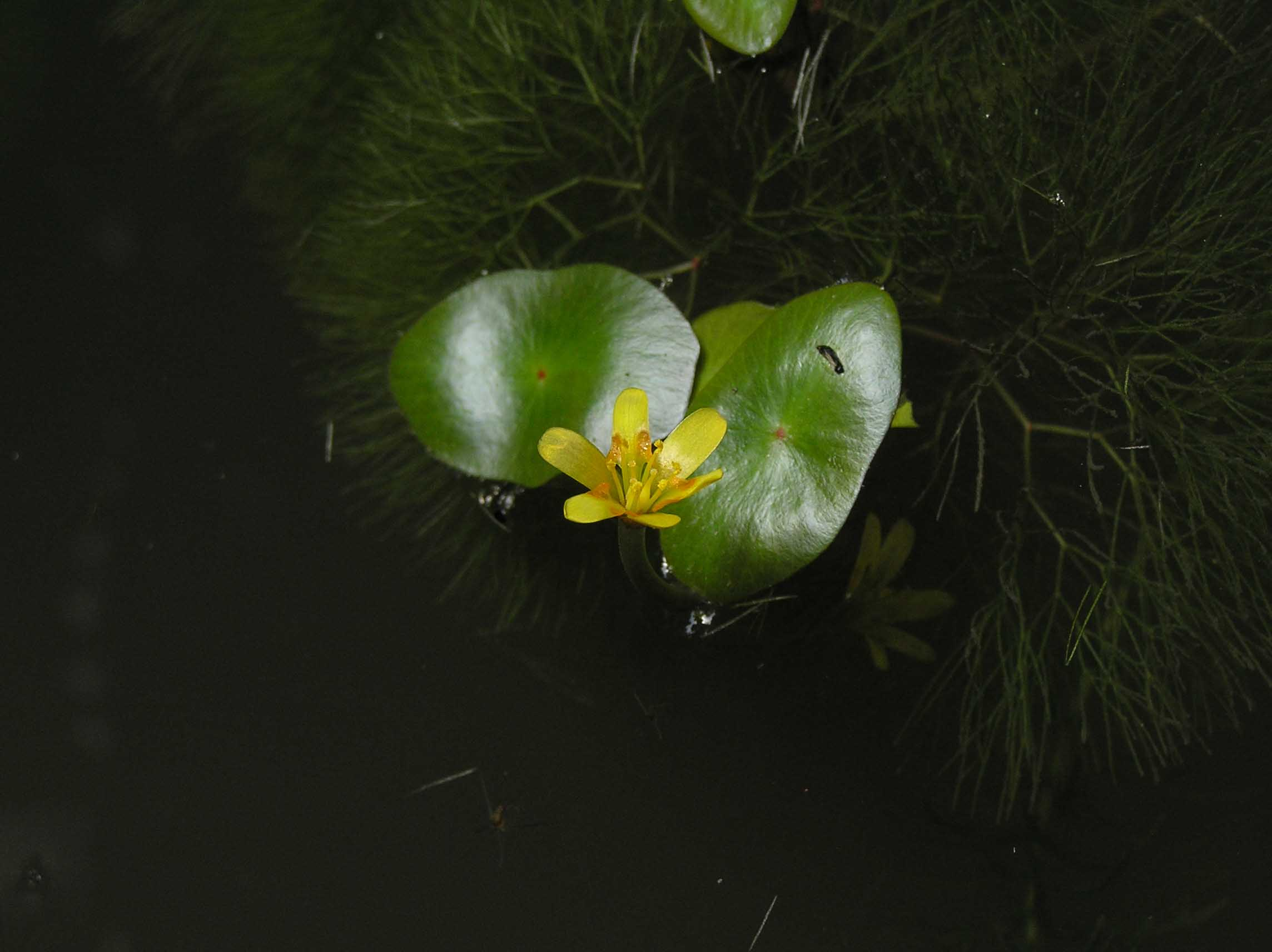
- Nymphaea lotus Trithuria submersa Barclaya longifolia Euryale ferox Nuphar lutea Victoria boliviana Brasenia schreberi Cabomba aquatica

Scientific classification
- Kingdom: Plantae
- Clade: Embryophytes
- Clade: Tracheophytes
- Clade: Angiosperms
- Order: Nymphaeales; Salisb. ex Bercht. & J.Presl

Families
- Cabombaceae Rich. ex A.Rich. Hydatellaceae U.Hamann; Nymphaeaceae Salisb.

Synonyms
- List: Barclayales Doweld; Cabombales Richard; Euryalales H. L. Li; Hydatellales Reveal & Doweld; Hydropeltidales Spenner; Hydatellanae Reveal; Nymphaeanae Reveal; Hydatellidae Doweld; Nymphaeidae Takhtajan; Hydropeltopsida Bartling; Nymphaeopsida Horaninow

= Nymphaeales =

Nymphaeales Temporal range: 130–0 Ma Early Cretaceous - Recent

Order of flowering plants

The Nymphaeales are an order of flowering plants, consisting of three families of aquatic plants, the Hydatellaceae, the Cabombaceae, and the Nymphaeaceae (water lilies). It is one of the three orders of basal angiosperms, an early-diverging grade of flowering plants. At least 10 morphological characters unite the Nymphaeales. One of the traits is the absence of a vascular cambium, which is required to produce both xylem (wood) and phloem, which therefore are missing. Molecular synapomorphies are also known.

The Plant List, created by the Royal Botanic Gardens, Kew and Missouri Botanical Garden recognizes about 70 species in 11 genera within the order, but a phylogenetic study of the genus Nymphaea implies that the number of species could be more than 90. The difference in species numbers is due almost entirely to the difficulty of delineating species in the genus Nymphaea.

Most of the species are rhizomatous aquatic herbs with a broad leaf base and large, showy flowers.

== Description ==
=== Vegetative characteristics ===
Nymphaeales are rhizomatous or tuberous, aquatic or sub-aquatic, annual or perennial herbs. The leaves are submerged, floating, or emerged. The floating leaves are 1 mm to 3.2 m wide.

=== Generative characteristics ===
The plants are bisexual, monoecious or dioecious. The female gametophyte is the Schisandra-type, consisting of four cells.

== Fossils ==
The fossil record consists especially of seeds, but also pollen, stems, leaves, and flowers. It extends back to the Cretaceous. The crown group of the Nymphaeales has been estimated to be about 112 million years old. Some have suggested that this age might be too old.

A basal member of Nymphaeales, Monetianthus, is known from Early Cretaceous Portugal. A fossil member of the Nympheaceae is Jaguariba from the Early Cretaceous of Brazil. Several Cretaceous-age Cabombaceae genera are also known, including Scutifolium from Jordan, Pluricarpellatia from Brazil, and Brasenites from Kansas. The fossil genus Notonuphar, thought to be a close relative of the modern Nuphar, is known from Eocene-aged sediments from Seymour Island, Antarctica. The genus Brasipelta Krassilov has been described from the late Cretaceous of Israel. The aquatic plant fossil Archaefructus from the Early Cretaceous of Liaoning, China possibly also belongs to this group.

== Classification ==
The Nymphaeales currently include three families and about 70 to 90 species.

order Nymphaeales

Cabombaceae
- Brasenia (one species)
- Cabomba (five species)
Hydatellaceae
- Trithuria (12 species)
Nymphaeaceae
- Barclaya (three or four species)
- Euryale (one species)
- Nuphar (10–12 species)
- Nymphaea (35–50 species)
- Victoria (three species)

- Angiosperms
  - Amborella
  - - Nymphaeales
      - Hydatellaceae
      - - - Cabombaceae
          - Nymphaeaceae
    - - Austrobaileyales
      - - - - magnoliids
            - Chloranthales
          - - monocots
            - - Ceratophyllum
              - eudicots

The classification of Nymphaeales and phylogeny within the flowering plants, as of APG III (2009).

This order was not part of the APG II system's 2003 plant classification (unchanged from the APG system of 1998), which instead had a broadly circumscribed family Nymphaeaceae (including Cabombaceae) unplaced in any order. The APG III system did separate the Cabombaceae from the Nymphaeaceae and placed them in the order Nymphaeales together with the Hydatellaceae. The family Hydatellaceae was placed among the monocots in previous systems, but a 2007 study found that the family belongs to the Nymphaeales. In the APG IV system, Hydatellaceae, Cabombaceae and Nymphaeaceae are the three families included in the Nymphaeales.

Some earlier systems, such as Cronquist's system of 1981, often included the Ceratophyllaceae and Nelumbonaceae in the Nymphaeales. Although, the Takhtajan system of 1980 separated the Nelumbonales, the new order was retained alongside the Nymphaeales in the superorder Nymphaeanae.

The Cronquist system placed the Nymphaeales in subclass Magnoliidae, in class Magnoliopsida [=dicotyledons]. In addition, Cronquist included the Ceratophyllaceae and split the family Barclayaceae from the Nymphaeaceae. Under the APG II system, the family Cabombaceae was included within the Nymphaeaceae, but could optionally be recognized separately. As of APG III, the two families are recognized separately.

The Dahlgren system placed the Nymphaeales with the Piperales in superorder Nymphaeanae, within subclass Magnoliideae (dicotyledons). Thorne's 1992 system (and 2000 revision) placed the Nymphaeales as the sole order in the superorder Nymphaeanae within subclass Magnoliideae (=dicotyledons).

Comparison of the Nymphaeales across five systems
APG III system Nymphaeales	Takhtajan system Nymphaeales	Cronquist system Nymphaeales	Dahlgren system Nymphaeales	Thorne system (1992) & (2000) Nymphaeales
Hydatellaceae	among monocots, as Hydatellales			
Cabombaceae	Cabombaceae Brasenia, Cabomba	Cabombaceae Brasenia, Cabomba	Cabombaceae	Cabombaceae Brasenia, Cabomba
Nymphaeaceae	Nymphaeaceae subf. Barclayoideae, Euryaloideae, Nymphaeoideae	Barclayaceae Barclaya	Nymphaeaceae	Nymphaeaceae Barclaya, Euryale, Nuphar, Nymphaea, Ondinea, Victoria
Nymphaeaceae	Nymphaeaceae subf. Barclayoideae, Euryaloideae, Nymphaeoideae	Nymphaeaceae Euryale, Nuphar, Nymphaea, Ondinea, Victoria	Nymphaeaceae	Nymphaeaceae Barclaya, Euryale, Nuphar, Nymphaea, Ondinea, Victoria
sister to eudicot clade	Ceratophyllaceae	Ceratophyllaceae	Ceratophyllaceae	in Ranunculanae
in Proteales	in Nelumbonales	Nelumbonaceae	in Magnolianae	in Ranunculanae
