= Gategourmet =

Swiss company providing food-related services to the travel industry

- Company type: Subsidiary
- Industry: Airline catering
- Headquarters: Glattbrugg, Switzerland
- Area served: Worldwide
- Key people: Christoph Schmitz
- Parent: Gategroup
- Website: gategourmet.com

Gategourmet is a global airline catering brand and a subsidiary of Gategroup. In 2024, it operated at more than 135 airports in 33 countries, providing catering and provisioning services to airlines worldwide.

== History ==
Gategourmet's roots go back to Swissair, the national airline founded in 1931. In 1992, Swissair spun off its catering activities into the new subsidiary called Gategourmet.

Gategourmet expanded internationally during the 1990s, entering the Brazilian market in 1995 and acquiring several catering operations, such as the acquisition of British Airways’ catering operations in 1997. By the end of the 1990s, the company was considered one of the world's leading airline catering companies. At that time, it operated 70 airline kitchens in 23 countries with 14,000 employees working for over 250 airlines. Annual turnover was CHF 1.3 billion. In 1999, Gategourmet purchased the Sydney and Darwin kitchens of Cathay Pacific. At this stage it operated 75 flight kitchens in 25 countries.

Prior to the September 11 attacks and the subsequent bankruptcy of Swissair, the company was valued at approximately CHF 6 billion. The rise of oil prices and collapse in consumer travel damaged airlines, and many of Gategourmet's main customers went bankrupt or barely avoided bankruptcy. The weakness of the airlines affected the industries that cater to or support it. As a result, Gategourmet was compelled to undergo restructuring—a process that soon placed considerable pressure on its workforce. The company was then sold in 2002 to Texas Pacific Group for US$870 million (CHF 1.1 billion).

On 1 March 2007, Texas Pacific Group sold its remaining shares in Gategourmet to Merrill Lynch.

On 27 September 2007, Gategourmet acquired a UK-based group operating under the Fernley and International Aviation Services (IAS) brands. The acquired companies offer services including aircraft cabin cleaning, aircraft washing, de-icing, and toilet and water servicing; security activities such as baggage screening and document verification; airport executive lounges; and passenger services such as wheelchair and unaccompanied minor assistance. Along with Fernley and IAS, the group also includes Specialist Airport Services, European Airport Services and Airfield Services Ltd. The companies operate primarily in the UK, including at London's Heathrow, Gatwick, Stansted and Luton airports, as well as Manchester, Dublin, Cork, Shannon, Liverpool, East Midlands, Biggin Hill and Glasgow. European Airport Services also operates in Amsterdam, Brussels, and several other regional airports in France and the Netherlands. The new range of Gategourmet's aviation special services was renamed Gate Aviation Services.

=== Creation of Gategroup ===
In 2008 the umbrella brand Gategroup was established by Gategourmet. It brought together Gategourmet and ten other subsidiaries (Supplair, Pourshins, deSter, potmstudios, Harmony, eGate Solutions, Performa, Elan, Gate Aviation and Gate Safe) to offer a wider range of aviation services under a single corporate identity. Since then, Gategourmet has been operating as a brand of Gategroup.

=== New developments ===
In 2013, Gategroup expanded into New Zealand through the acquisition of Pacific Flight Catering.

In February 2018, Virgin Australia announced that Gategourmet would become its sole catering provider. The six-year agreement, effective from late June 2018, covers inflight dining and handling for passengers across Asia, Australia, and North America. The same year, Gategourmet acquired the operating assets and customer contracts of SCK Sky Catering Kitchen Group, a company founded in Stuttgart, Germany. Before the acquisition, SCK provided catering services to domestic and international airlines from facilities in Stuttgart, Berlin Tegel, Berlin Schönefeld and Nuremberg.

In February 2019, Gategourmet extended its catering agreement with Delta Air Lines for an additional five years. Under the contract, the company became the exclusive service partner for 45 Delta locations across North America, Latin America, Europe and the Asia-Pacific region. Also in early 2019, Gategourmet entered the Indonesian market by launching catering services at Bali Denpasar International Airport. The company signed a long-term partnership with Angkasa Pura Hotels (APH) to manage and operate an existing APH catering facility at the airport. In November 2019, Gategourmet relocated its Madrid catering operation to a new facility in Coslada, near Madrid–Barajas Airport.

== Structure ==
Gategourmet is the core brand of Gategroup Holding AG, a Switzerland-based airline catering and hospitality services company. Gategroup is owned 50% by Temasek and 50% by the investment company RRJ Capital.

In 2024, Gategourmet operated at more than 135 airports in 33 countries.

== Activities and services ==
Gategourmet provides inflight catering and related services for airlines worldwide. The company operates large-scale kitchen facilities near major airports, including units in North America, Europe, Asia, and Australia. In Canada, for example, Gategourmet runs eight facilities and prepares around 5,000 meals per day at its Calgary site, serving carriers such as Air Canada and WestJet. In the United States, its Washington Dulles kitchen prepares meals for international airlines including United Airlines, British Airways, Air France and Virgin Atlantic.

Menus are developed in cooperation with airline customers and tailored to the requirements of inflight service. Meals are cooked in advance, blast-chilled, and later reheated by cabin crew on board.

Beyond food preparation, Gategourmet also manages the logistics of provisioning aircraft, which involves transporting meals by specialized trucks and ensuring galley equipment, tableware, and other onboard items are cleaned, stocked and delivered to flights on time.

== Food safety ==
=== IFSA ===
Gategourmet is an active member of The International Food Services Association's Government Affairs and Education Committee, which issues the World Food Safety Guidelines for Airline Catering (WFSG). IFSA noted in the 2019 WFSG release: "Food safety has long been recognized by the airline catering industry as a matter of paramount importance and this is reflected in its ongoing commitment to the development of industry guidelines."

=== Needles incident ===
On July 16, 2012, sewing needles were discovered in four different turkey sandwiches on separate Delta Air Lines flights. Each sandwich was distributed by Gategourmet. The flights originated from Schiphol Airport in Amsterdam, Netherlands, to several different U.S. cities, including Atlanta, Minneapolis, and Seattle. The needles were discovered by passengers, including a U.S. Federal Air Marshal. In response to the incident, Delta advised all of their flights leaving Schiphol Airport to stop serving the sandwiches, and an FBI investigation was launched to determine the cause. One passenger was injured, but declined medical attention.

=== FDA inspection ===
In December 2017, the FDA inspected one of Gategourmet's facilities in Erlanger, Kentucky. The FDA found a number of health infractions, including "too numerous to count cockroaches", including live cockroaches in the ovens used to prepare food, as well as broken and filthy equipment. Also, inspectors observed employees cleaning grills with only water and orange juice. In May 2018, the FDA reported that Gategourmet had addressed these concerns.
