= Gategroup =

Swiss company providing food-related services to the travel industry

gategroup
- Type: Private
- Industry: Airline catering
- Headquarters: Glattbrugg, Switzerland
- Area served: Worldwide
- Key people: Christoph Schmitz (CEO); Timo Vättö (Chairman)
- Revenue: CHF 5.2 billion (2024)
- Operating income: CHF 177.8 million (2024)
- Net income: CHF 23 million (2024)
- Number of employees: >45.000
- Parent: RRJ Capital 50%; Temasek 50%
- Subsidiaries: Gategourmet; Servair; DeSter; Gateretail; Gatesolutions; Uqonic
- Website: www.gategroup.com

Gategroup is a Swiss company providing services to the travel industry, including catering, onboard retail, food service provisioning, and food logistics. Gategroup operates more than 200 facilities in over 60 countries. Its head office is in Glattbrugg, Switzerland, near Zurich Airport.

== History ==
=== Beginnings and initial expansion (1992 to 2002) ===
Gategroup has its roots in Swissair catering, from which now-subsidiary Gate Gourmet emerged in 1992. Through a series of mergers and acquisitions, Gategroup has grown into a multibillion-dollar operation. Acquisitions include Aero-Chef, SAS Service Partner, VARIG Kitchens, British Airways Kitchens and Iber-Swiss.

In 1999, Gategroup purchased the Sydney and Darwin kitchens of Cathay Pacific. At this stage it operated 75 flight kitchens in 25 countries.

Prior to the September 11 attacks and the subsequent bankruptcy of Swissair, the company was valued at approximately CHF 6 billion. The rise of oil prices and collapse in consumer travel damaged airlines and many of Gate Gourmet's main customers went bankrupt or barely avoided bankruptcy. The weakness of the airlines affected the industries that cater to or support it. This set the stage for Gate Gourmet requiring a restructuring effort, which soon burdened its employees. The company was then sold in 2002 to Texas Pacific Group for US$870 million.

=== Acquisitions (2007 to 2016) ===
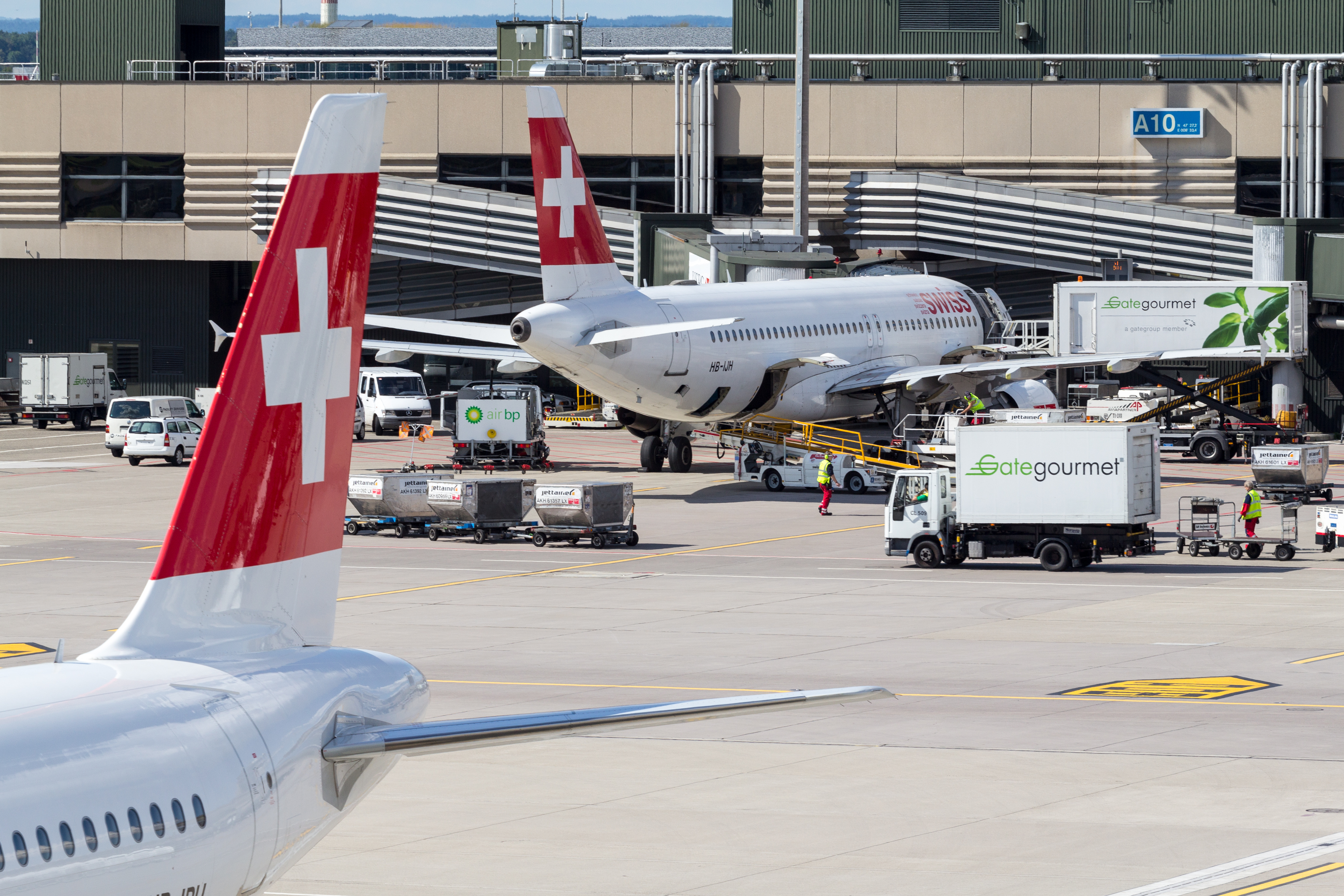
Feeding the birds: GateGourmet at Zurich Airport

On 1 March 2007, Texas Pacific Group sold its remaining shares in Gate Gourmet to Merrill Lynch.

On September 27, 2007, Gate Gourmet acquired a UK-based group operating under the Fernley and International Aviation Services (IAS) brands. The acquired companies offer services including aircraft cabin cleaning, aircraft washing, de-icing and toilet and water servicing; security activities such as baggage screening and document verification; airport executive lounges; and passenger services such as wheelchair and unaccompanied minor assistance. Along with Fernley and IAS, the group also includes Specialist Airport Services, European Airport Services and Airfield Services. The companies operate primarily in the UK, including at London's Heathrow, Gatwick, Stansted and Luton airports, as well as Manchester, Dublin, Cork, Shannon, Liverpool, East Midlands, Biggin Hill and Glasgow. European Airport Services also operates in Amsterdam, Brussels, and several other regional airports in France and the Netherlands. The new range of Gate Gourmet's aviation special services were renamed Gate Aviation Services.

In May 2009, Gategroup was listed on the SIX Swiss Exchange under the ticker GATE. Following its IPO, the company pursued further expansion through acquisitions. In 2010, the company acquired Cara Airline Solutions, the catering business from Cara Operations, thus investing in airline catering services in Canada. This was followed in 2012 by the purchase of two Qantas QCatering flight kitchens in Australia: the Riverside kitchen in Sydney, which served third-party airlines, and the full operation in Cairns. The acquisition excluded Qantas' in-house catering centre at Sydney Airport, now operated by Dnata.

In 2013, Gategroup expanded into New Zealand through the acquisition of Pacific Flight Catering. In February 2016, the company acquired the Swedish travel retail specialist Inflight Service Group (IFS). In March 2016, Gategroup acquired 75% of Cambodia Air Catering Services.

=== Developments from 2016 to the present ===
In April 2016, Chinese conglomerate HNA Group offered to buy Gategroup for CHF 1.4 billion. In the beginning of July 2016, HNA Group declared they had bought 63.6 percent of the voting rights and shares in Gategroup. By October 2016, HNA Group had acquired 96.1 percent of the voting rights and applied for a delisting of the remaining shares in Gategroup. They also informed that they were seeking to acquire 98 percent in order to request for the cancellation of the remaining publicly held shares.

In January 2017, Gategroup acquired control of Servair from Air France, thereby expanding its operations in Africa. Around the same time, Gatgroup was delisted from the SIX Swiss Exchange.

In February 2018, Gategroup co-founded the Airline Catering Association (ACA), which is based in Brussels, Belgium. The company also took over German Sky Catering Kitchen GmbH (SCK).

In July 2018, Temasek and RRJ Capital joined HNA Group as investors in Gategroup. In April 2019, RRJ Capital acquired all remaining shares held by HNA and became the sole owner of Gategroup. Temasek's investment was structured through a mandatory exchangeable bond. In September 2019, Temasek converted the mandatory exchangeable bond to acquire a 50% stake in Gategroup, making Temasek and RRJ co-shareholders.

In December 2019, Gategroup announced an agreement to acquire the European operations of Lufthansa subsidiary LSG Group. The deal included LSG's in-flight catering businesses in Germany, Switzerland, the Netherlands, Belgium, Italy and Spain; its global equipment brand Spirant; the convenience food business Evertaste; train catering and lounge services; and the Ringeltaube retail operations. Gategroup also took over Lufthansa's catering contract at the airline's hubs in Frankfurt and Munich. The transaction was completed on 2 December 2020.

As a result of the COVID-19 pandemic, Gategroup entered a financial crisis due to the massive decline in air traffic. In December 2020, Gategroup worked with SGS to implement global food safety and COVID hygiene standards in all catering facilities. In response to the financial losses, the company initiated a court-approved restructuring under UK law (Part 26A of the Companies Act 2006) in late 2020. To do so, it established a UK-based entity, Gategroup Guarantee Limited, which assumed certain financial obligations of the group. This allowed Gategroup to restructure its debt despite limited participation from bondholders. The High Court of England and Wales approved the plan in March 2021, enabling a five-year extension of existing loan and bond maturities.

In February 2023, Gategroup and Immfly Group entered into a strategic alliance to integrate digital platforms used in cabin services, including systems for crew operations, payments, and in-seat ordering.

== Company structure ==
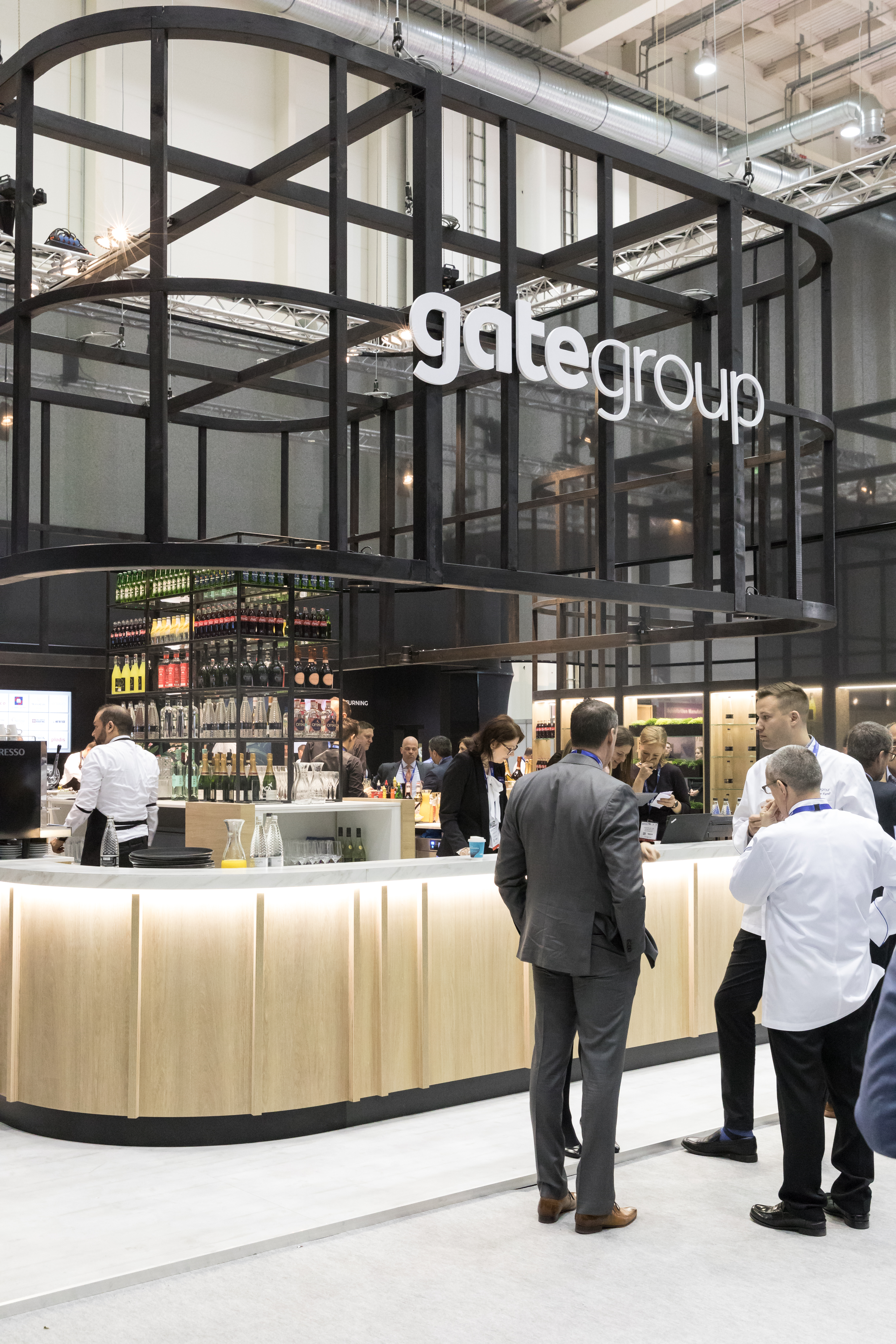
Gategroup exhibit stand at Passenger Experience Week 2018

Gategroup Holding AG is jointly owned by Temasek Holdings (50%) and RRJ Capital (50%), both based in Singapore.

The company is headquartered in Glattbrugg, Switzerland. The Group Executive Management includes Christoph Schmitz (Chief Executive Officer). The Board of Directors is chaired by Timo Vättö.

In 2024, Gategroup operated in over 200 locations and 60 countries. It employed over 45,000 people worldwide and generated total revenues of CHF 5.2 billion and EBITDA of CHF 391 million. The United States business reached the highest part of the revenue with CHF 1.4 billion, followed by Germany with CHF 789 million, France with CHF 645 million and Switzerland with CHF 371 million. The rest was generated in other countries.

== Business activities and subsidiaries ==
Gategroup's operations are structured into two divisions: Aviation Services and Food Solutions. The Aviation Services division covers airline catering, onboard retail operations, and the management of airport lounges. The Food Solutions division includes packaged meals, sandwiches, railway catering, event catering, and the manufacture of food packaging and service equipment. These services are provided to clients in the travel, rail, and foodservice sectors.

As of 2024, Gategroup operates several subsidiaries across different segments of the travel and food service industries:

- Gategourmet is the group's global airline catering brand, employing over 40,000 people. In 2024, it operated at more than 135 airports in 33 countries, providing catering and provisioning services to airlines worldwide.
- Servair operates in France and Africa, providing inflight catering and additional hospitality services. In 2024, Michel Roth was appointed President of the Servair Studio Culinaire, which develops culinary concepts for air travel.
- DeSter designs and manufactures food packaging and serviceware for the aviation, hospitality, and food service sectors.
- Gateretail provides onboard retail programs for airlines and rail operators. In 2024, it served more than 18 customers in 14 countries and supplied retail services on over 1.5 million flights.
- Gatesolutions is a brand for packaged meals, train catering, and event catering. It provides services to European railway operators including TGV Lyria and Iryo.
- Uqonic operates airport lounges and provides catering and hospitality services. In 2024, it managed more than 80 lounges and served over 16 million guests globally.

== Asiana Airlines lawsuit ==
In 2022, Asiana Airlines filed criminal and civil lawsuits against former executives of Gategroup, alleging collusion with former Kumho Asiana Group chairman Park Sam-koo in securing a 30-year exclusive inflight catering contract at a significantly undervalued price in 2016. Asiana claims the deal, worth KRW 133.3 billion, was linked to Gategroup's purchase of bonds and warrants issued to support an affiliated Kumho company. Park was arrested in 2021 over related intra-group transactions and remains on trial. The lawsuits are widely viewed as part of Asiana's efforts to reduce legal and financial risks amid Korean Air's proposed acquisition of the airline. In 2025, Park was sentenced to 2 years and 6 months in prison with 4 years of probation for unfair support of affiliates.
