= Servair =

European airport catering company

- Industry: Airline catering
- Founded: 1971
- Headquarters: Paris Charles de Gaulle Airport; France
- Area served: Worldwide
- Key people: Sébastien Burnier; Guy Zacklad
- Number of employees: >10,000
- Parent: Gategroup
- Website: www.servair.fr

Servair is a French airline catering company. It is a majority-owned subsidiary of the Swiss catering company Gategroup (70%), with Air France being a reference shareholder. Servair has its head office at Paris-Charles de Gaulle Airport.

== History ==
=== Founding and establishment ===
Founded in 1971 as a subsidiary of Air France, the company opened its first catering production facility in 1974 to coincide with the inauguration of Charles de Gaulle Airport.

On March 13, 1974, Servair provided catering for the first time, supplying a TWA Boeing 747 with onboard meals.

In 1987, Servair was selected by SNCF to provide catering services on the TGV-Atlantique high speed rail service. After 11 years, Servair sold its railway catering division to Wagons-Lits, a subsidiary of Accor.

In 1989, Servair started its development in Africa, beginning in Libreville, Gabon.

From 1992, Servair expanded its services to include cleaning and cabin fitting. In 1993, it also introduced special flight services, which encompassed personalised services for Concorde flights as well as presidential flights.

In the following years, Servair continued to expand its range of services and offerings. In 2003, Aeroform was established, later renamed Servair Formation, which provides airport handling training for Servair employees. In 2009, Servair began to broaden its culinary offerings by founding the Servair Culinary Studio, led by Michel Roth from 2024. In 2012, the company introduced services for airport lounge management. Additionally, in 2015, the first Servair operated Burger King was opened.

In 2010, Servair signed a seven-year contract to become catering purchasing advisor for former Italian airline Alitalia.

=== Takeover by Gategroup ===
In early 2016, Air France announced its intention to sell the majority stake in Servair. By January 2017, Gategroup acquired 50% minus one share of Servair, at a company valuation of €237.5 million. This move established Gategroup as the market leader in food-related services to the travel industry and increased its revenue from CHF 3 billion to around CHF 4.4 billion. By acquiring additional shares in 2019, the group increased its stake in Servair to 50.0% plus one share. Following further adjustments to the put option structure, it raised its ownership to 65.0% on May 31, 2021. In 2024, a new agreement and revised option terms led to the purchase of another 5.0%, bringing the Group's total ownership to 70.0% as of December 31, 2024.

In 2018, Servair opened its new production unit in Ghana at Accra International Airport.

In response to the downturn in the airline catering sector during the COVID-19 pandemic, Servair diversified its operations by supplying rations to African military forces.

=== Catering for ISS space mission ===
In 2021, Servair was commissioned by the European Space Agency (ESA) to develop gourmet meals for astronauts aboard the International Space Station (ISS) during the Alpha mission. The project involved cooperation with astronaut Thomas Pesquet and the Technical Center for the Preservation of Agricultural Products (CTCPA). The meals had to meet specific criteria, including a two-year shelf life at room temperature, reduced sodium content, and the absence of alcohol.

=== Expansion of sustainability and the culinary offering ===
By the end of 2022, Air France committed to offering exclusively French meat, dairy products, and eggs, as well as fish from local fisheries and sustainable organic children's menus on its flights departing from Paris, across all cabins. To combat waste, the airline introduced a pre-selection of hot meals in Business Class prior to departure. Additionally, it aimed to eliminate 90% of single-use plastics by early 2023.

In 2024, Servair partnered with la marque du consommateur (the consumer brand) to incorporate consumer-driven products into its offerings. The collaboration begins with UHT milk and is set to expand to other products.

Since February 1, 2024, Air France has been offering its Business customers travelling on its short-haul network a catering offer developed in collaboration with François Adamski, Bocuse d’Or winner and Meilleur Ouvrier de France recipient.

== Company Structure ==
Servair is a subsidiary of Gategroup (70%). The company has several own subsidiaries and production sites in France. Servair has over 30 catering units in 19 countries and maintains a laboratory for quality and food safety. The company is led by Sébastien Burnier, who heads the Southern Europe and Africa region, and Guy Zackland, the General Manager.

== Services ==
The company's primary revenue streams are divided into airport and food services, which operate at an industrial and institutional scale.

The on-board food services include design of meals, food preparations, arrangement of the food on trays, and their delivery to the aircraft. Servair offers over 5,000 different recipes and over 1,000 menus and produces over 120,000 meals every day. Servair also operates several airport lounges, shops, bars and restaurants and cleaning services.

== Awards (Selection) ==
- 2023 and 2024: World Airlines Award, awarded by Skytrax for the first class of Air France.
- 2024 and 2025: Airline Caterer of the Year Africa, awarded by Pax.
- 2025: Top Chef Eurocham Bénin award, presented by Eurocham Bénin in partnership with the French Embassy.
