= Turndown service =

Hotel service: preparing the bed for use

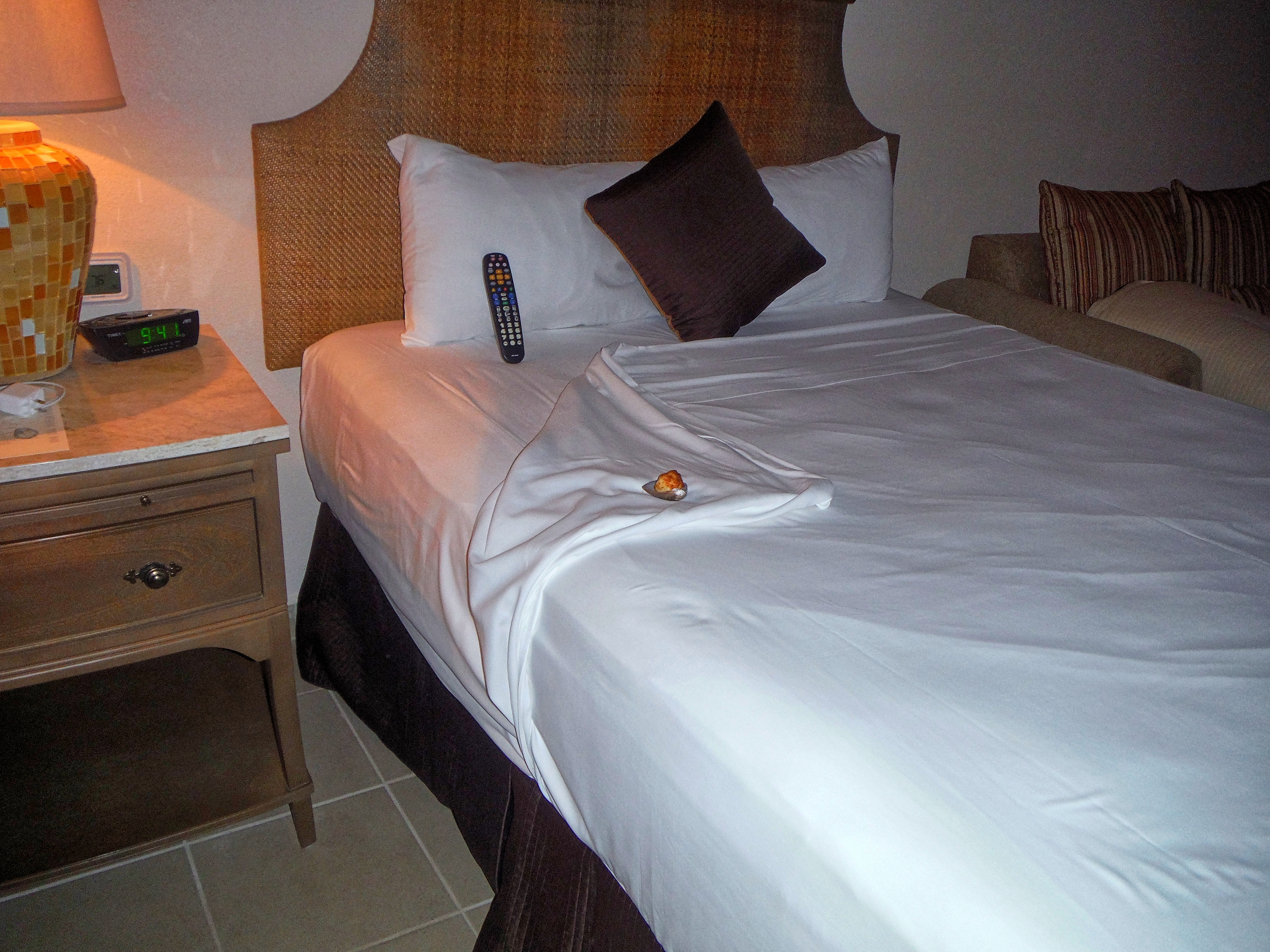
Turndown service in Loreto, Baja California Sur

In the hospitality industry, turndown service is the practice of staff entering a guest's room and "turning down" the bed linen of the bed, preparing the bed for use.

In multiple countries, an item of confectionery such as a chocolate or a mint is sometimes left on top of a pillow on the bed that has been turned down.

Some hotels have more elaborate turndown services, such as bed-time stories for children and cocktails served to couples.
