= Air France =

Flag carrier airline of France

Société Air France, S.A.

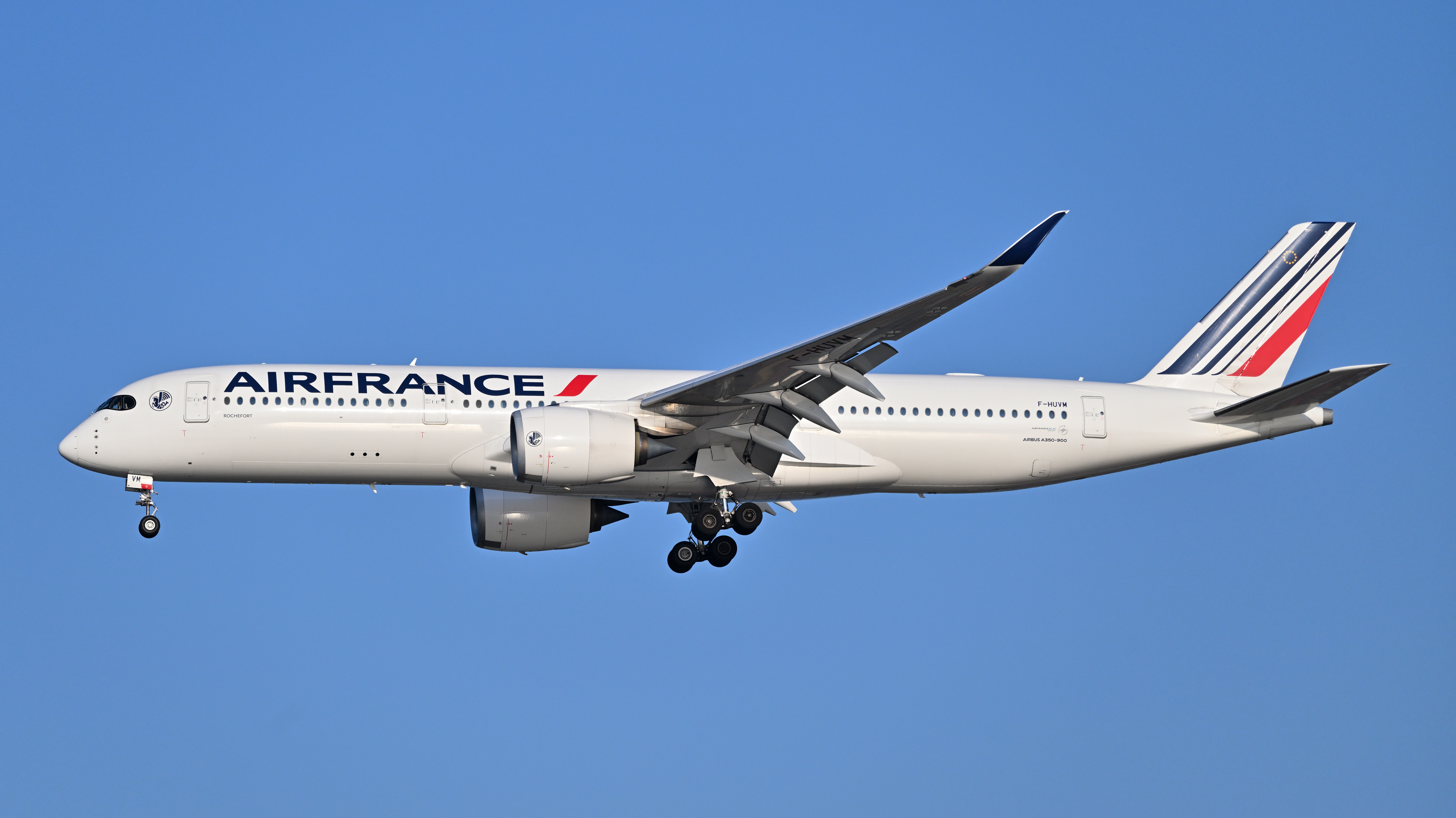
- Air France Airbus A350-900
IATA	ICAO	Call sign
AF	AFR	AIRFRANS
- Founded: 30 August 1933; 93 years ago
- Hubs: Paris–Charles de Gaulle
- Focus cities: Lyon; Marseille; Nice; Toulouse
- Frequent-flyer program: Flying Blue
- Alliance: SkyTeam
- Subsidiaries: Air France Hop; Servair (50.01%); Transavia France (100%)
- Destinations: 184
- Parent company: Air France–KLM
- Headquarters: Roissypôle, CDG Airport, Tremblay-en-France, France
- Key people: Benjamin Smith (Air France–KLM CEO and Air France Chairman); Anne Rigail (Air France CEO)
- Revenue: €20,2 billion (2025)
- Operating income: €1,3 billion (2025)
- Employees: 44,559
- Website: www.airfrance.com

Air France (French pronunciation: [ɛːʁ fʁɑ̃s]; legally Société Air France, S.A.), stylised as AIRFRANCE, is the flag carrier of France. The airline is a subsidiary of the Air France–KLM Group and is one of the founding members of the SkyTeam airline alliance. As of 2013, Air France served 29 destinations in France and operates worldwide scheduled passenger and cargo services to 201 destinations in 78 countries (93 including overseas departments and territories of France) and also carried 46,803,000 passengers in 2019. The airline maintains its global and domestic hub at Charles de Gaulle Airport. Air France's corporate headquarters, previously in Montparnasse, Paris, are located at the Roissypôle complex on the grounds of Charles de Gaulle Airport, north of Paris.

Tracing its origins back to the 1910s, Air France was formed on 30 August 1933 through the merger of five existing airlines in France. During the Cold War, from 1950 until 1990, it was one of the three main Allied scheduled airlines operating in Germany at West Berlin's Tempelhof and Tegel airports. In 1990, it acquired the operations of French domestic carrier Air Inter and international rival UTA – Union de Transports Aériens. It merged with KLM to form Air France–KLM in 2003.

In 2018, Air France and its regional subsidiary Hop carried 51.4 million passengers. Air France operates a mixed fleet of Airbus and Boeing wide-body jets on long-haul routes, and uses Airbus A320 family narrow-body aircraft on short-haul routes. Air France introduced the Airbus A380 on 20 November 2009 with service from Paris to New York. Air France Hop (formerly HOP!) operates the majority of its regional domestic and European scheduled services with a fleet of regional jet aircraft.

== History ==
=== Formation and early years ===
Former Air France logo

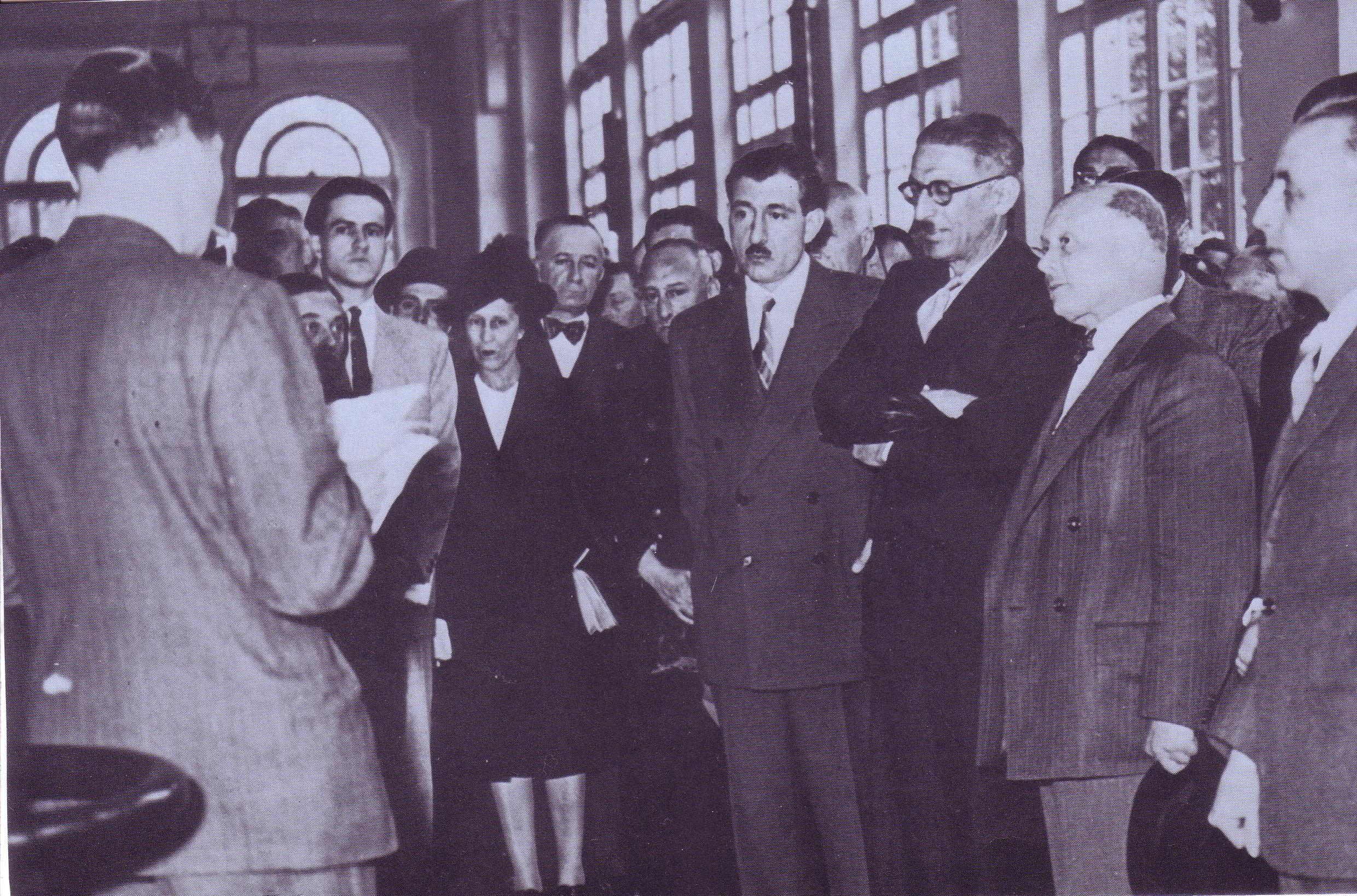
The inauguration of the Aérogare des Invalides on 21 August 1951

The predecessor companies of Air France date back to Compagnie générale transaérienne (CGT), established in 1909, which flew the world's first scheduled passenger-carrying fixed-wing flights within France in 1913. Air France was formed on 30 August 1933 as a merger of five existing airlines: Compagnie Générale Aéropostale, which was founded in 1918 as Société des lignes Latécoère and, in some sources, the earliest lineage of Air France is stated to be 1918; Société Générale des Transports Aériens (SGTA), which was founded in 1919; Compagnie Internationale de Navigation Aérienne (CIDNA), which was founded in 1920; Air Union, which was founded in 1923 and formed from the merger of Compagnie des Messageries Aériennes (CMA), which absorbed CGT, and Grands Express Aériens; and Air Orient, which was founded in 1929. SGTA was the first commercial passenger airline company in France; founded as Lignes Aériennes Farman in 1919, it began a weekly service between Paris and Brussels on 22 March 1919, the world's first international commercial aviation service. Société des lignes Latécoère began airmail services in 1924. These airlines built extensive networks across Europe, to French colonies in North Africa and farther afield prior to their merger into Air France in 1933.

In 1936, Air France added French-built twin engine Potez 62 aircraft to its fleet featuring a two-compartment cabin that could accommodate 14 to 16 passengers. A high-wing monoplane, it had a wooden fuselage with composite coating while the wings were fabric-covered with a metal leading edge. Equipped with Hispano-Suiza V-engines, they were used on routes in Europe, South America and the Far East. Although cruising at only 280 km/h (175 mph), the Potez 62 was a robust and reliable workhorse for Air France and remained in service until the Second World War with one used by the Free French Air Force.

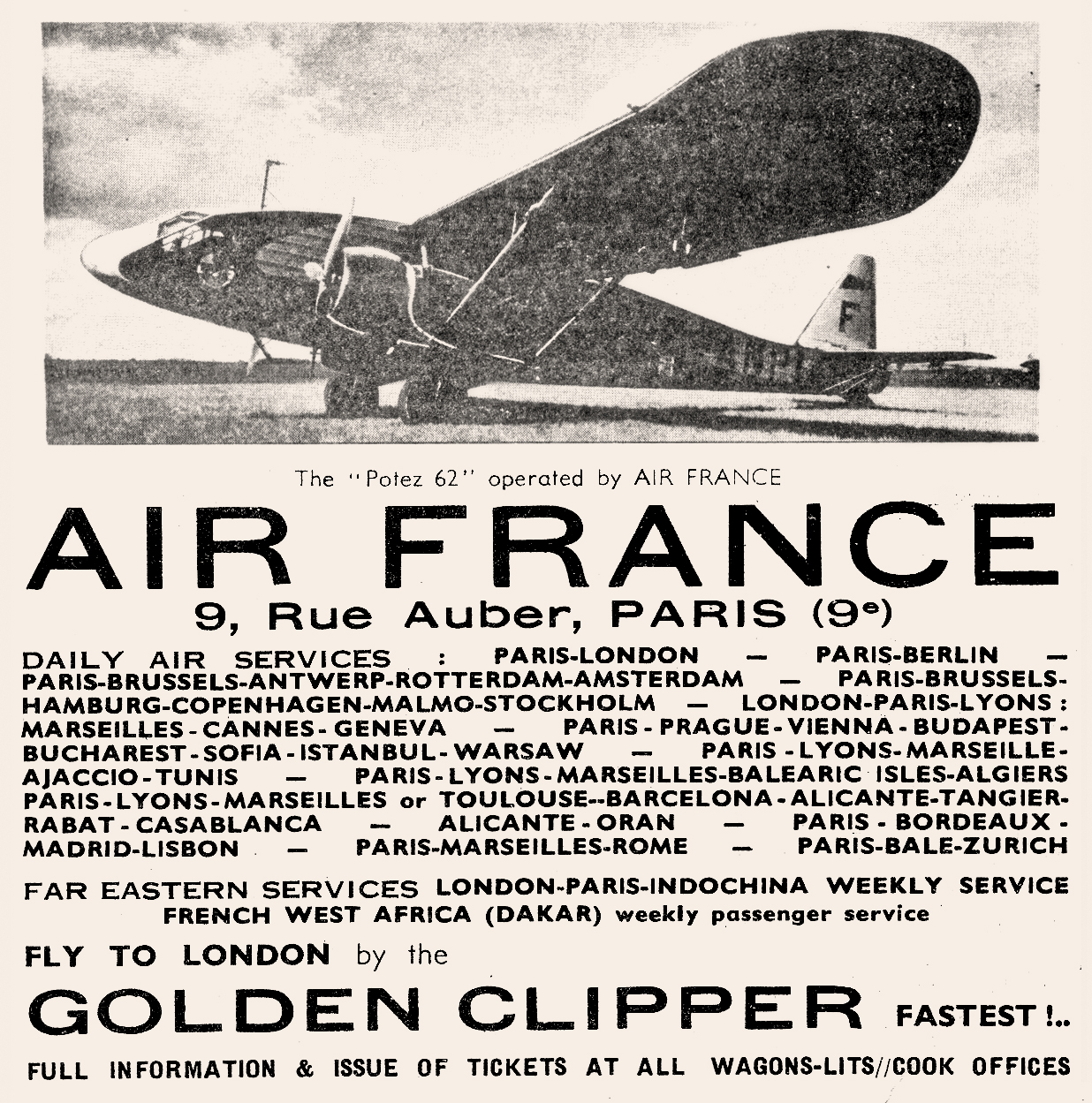
1936 Air France ad for service using Potez 62 twin-engine aircraft

During World War II, Air France moved its operations to Casablanca, Morocco. On 26 June 1945, all of France's air transport companies were nationalised. On 29 December 1945, a decree of the French Government granted Air France the management of the entire French air transport network. Air France recruited its first female flight attendants in 1946. The same year the airline opened its first air terminal at Les Invalides in central Paris. It was linked to Paris Le Bourget Airport, Air France's first operations and engineering base, by coach. At that time the network covered 160,000 km, claimed to be the longest in the world. Société Nationale Air France was set up on 1 January 1946.

European schedules were initially operated by a fleet of Douglas DC-3 aircraft. On 1 July 1946, Air France started direct flights between Paris and New York via refuelling stops at Shannon and Gander. Douglas DC-4 piston-engine airliners covered the route in just under 20 hours. In September 1947, Air France's network stretched east from New York, Fort de France and Buenos Aires to Shanghai.

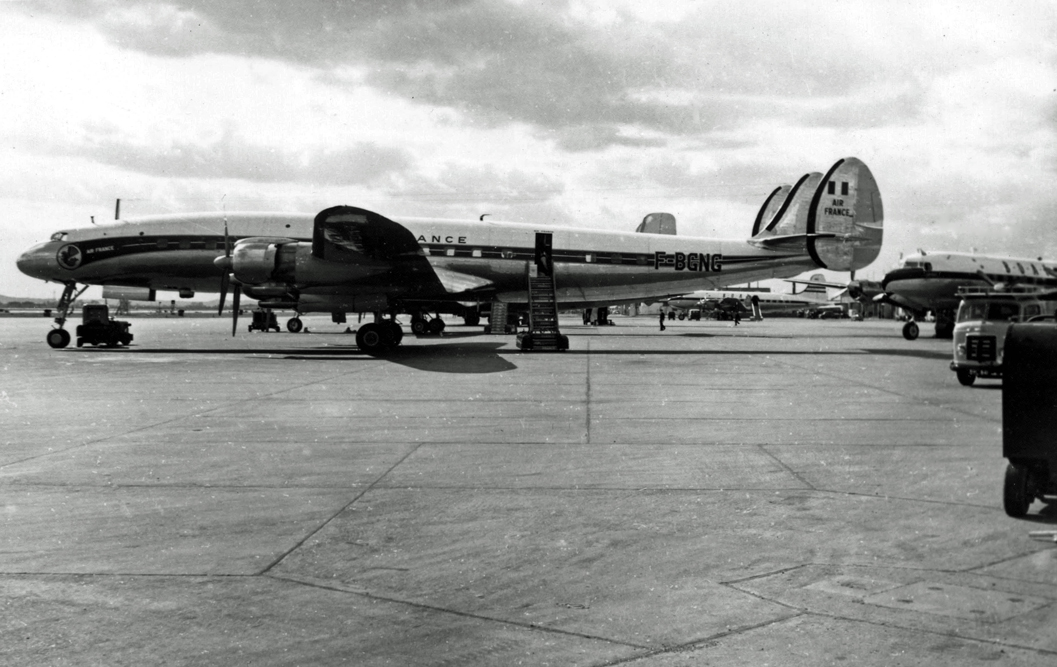
A Lockheed Super Constellation of Air France at Heathrow Airport, 1955

By 1948, Air France operated 130 aircraft, one of the largest fleets in the world. Between 1947 and 1965, the airline operated Lockheed Constellations on passenger and cargo services worldwide. In 1946 and 1948, respectively, the French government authorised the creation of two private airlines: Transports Aériens Internationaux – later Transports Aériens Intercontinentaux – (TAI) and SATI. In 1949, the latter became part of Union Aéromaritime de Transport (UAT), a private French international airline.

Compagnie Nationale Air France was created by act of parliament on 16 June 1948. Initially, the government held 70%. In subsequent years, the French state's direct and indirect shareholdings reached almost 100%. In mid 2002, the state held 54%.

On 4 August 1948, Max Hymans was appointed the president. During his 13-year tenure he would implement modernisation practices centred on the introduction of jet aircraft. In 1949, the company became a co-founder of Société Internationale de Télécommunications Aéronautiques (SITA), an airline telecommunications services company.

=== Jet age reorganisation ===
In 1952, Air France moved its operations and engineering base to the new Orly Airport South terminal. By then the network covered 250,000 km. Air France entered the jet age in August 1953, flying the original, short-lived de Havilland Comet series 1A Paris-Rome-Beirut.

In the mid 1950s, it also operated the Vickers Viscount turboprop, with twelve entering service between May 1953 and August 1954 on the European routes. On 26 September 1953, the government instructed Air France to share long-distance routes with new private airlines. This was followed by the Ministry of Public Works and Transport's imposition of an accord on Air France, Aigle Azur, TAI and UAT, under which some routes to Africa, Asia and the Pacific region were transferred to private carriers.

On 23 February 1960, the Ministry of Public Works and Transport transferred Air France's domestic monopoly to Air Inter. To compensate for the loss of its domestic network Air France was given a stake in Air Inter. The following day Air France was instructed to share African routes with Air Afrique and UAT.

The airline started uninterrupted jet operations in 1960 with the Sud Aviation Caravelle and the Boeing 707; jet airliners cut travel times in half and improved comfort. Air France later became an early Boeing 747 operator and eventually had one of the world's largest Boeing 747 fleets.

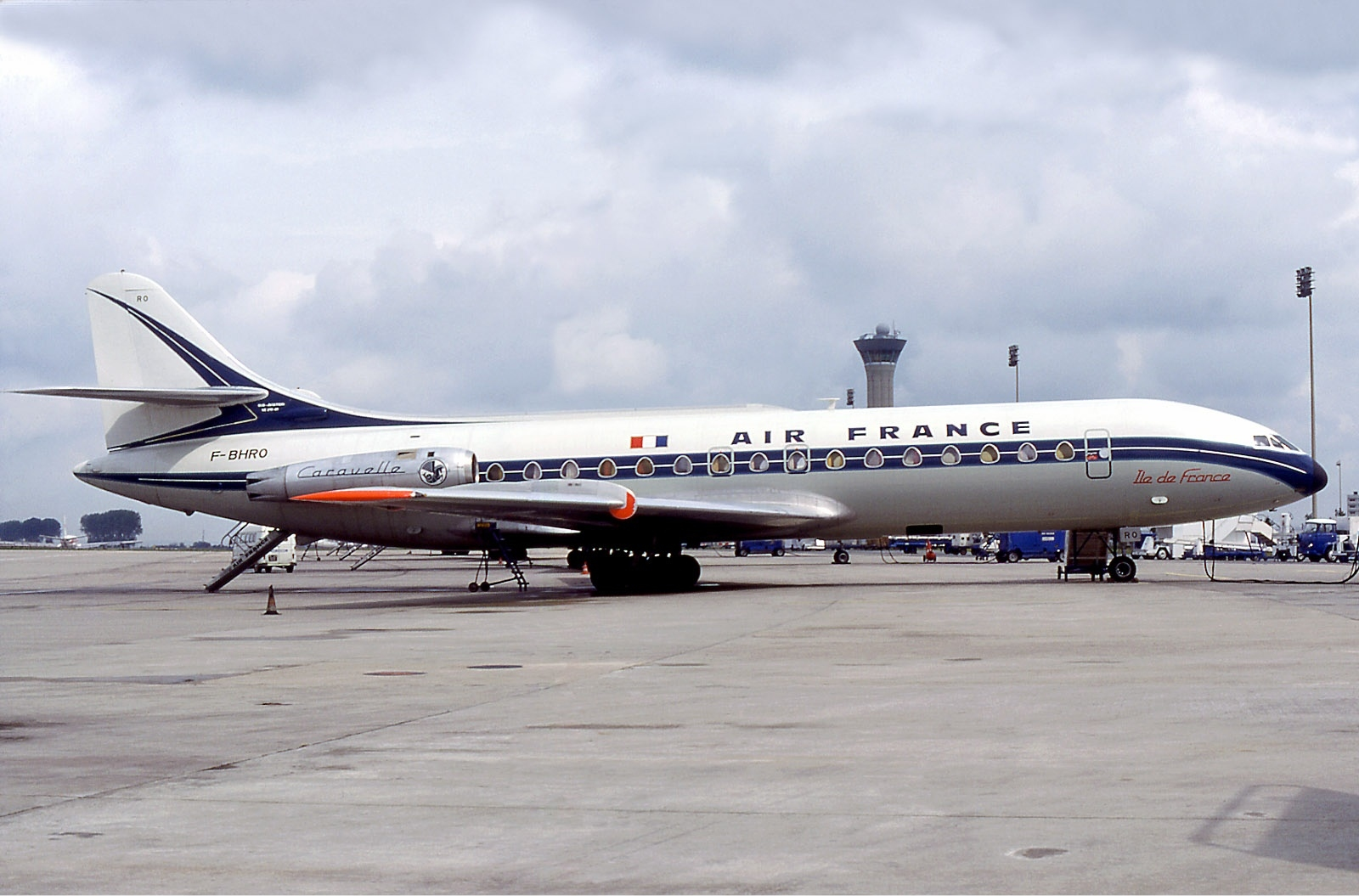
Air France Caravelle in 1977

On 1 February 1963, the government formalised division of routes between Air France and its private sector rivals. Air France was to withdraw services to West Africa (except Senegal), Central Africa (except Burundi and Rwanda), Southern Africa (including South Africa), Libya in North Africa, Bahrain and Oman in the Middle East, Sri Lanka (then known as Ceylon) in South Asia, Indonesia, Malaysia and Singapore in Southeast Asia, Australia, New Zealand as well as New Caledonia and Tahiti. These routes were allocated to the new Union de Transports Aériens (UTA), a new private airline resulting from the merger of TAI and UAT. UTA also got exclusive rights between Japan, New Caledonia and New Zealand, South Africa and Réunion island in the Indian Ocean, as well as Los Angeles and Tahiti.

In 1974, Air France began shifting the bulk of operations to the new Charles de Gaulle Airport north of Paris. By the early 1980s, only Corsica, Martinique, Guadeloupe, most services to French Guiana, Réunion, the Maghreb region, Eastern Europe (except the USSR), Southern Europe (except Greece and Italy), and one daily service to New York (JFK) remained at Orly. In 1974, Air France also became the world's first operator of the Airbus A300 twin-engine widebody plane, Airbus Industrie's first commercial airliner for which it was a launch customer.

=== Concorde service and rivalry ===
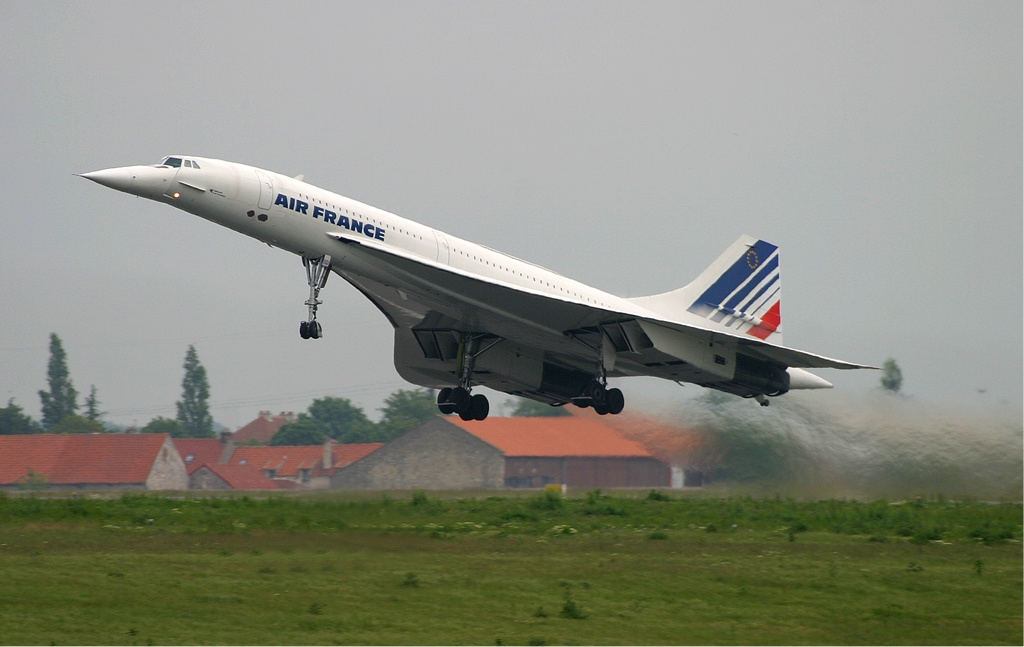
Air France Concorde at Charles de Gaulle Airport in 2003

On 21 January 1976, Air France operated its inaugural supersonic transport (SST) service on the Paris (Charles de Gaulle) to Rio (via Dakar) route with Anglo-French BAC-Aérospatiale Concorde F-BVFA. Supersonic services from Paris (CDG) to Washington Dulles International Airport began on 24 May 1976, also with F-BVFA. Service to New York (JFK) – the only remaining Concorde service until its end – commenced on 22 November 1977. Paris to New York was flown in 3 hours 23 minutes, at about twice the speed of sound. Approval for flights to the United States was initially withheld due to noise protests. Eventually, services to Mexico City via Washington, D.C., were started. Air France became one of only two airlines – British Airways being the other – to regularly operate supersonic services, and continued daily transatlantic Concorde service until late May 2003.

By 1983, Air France's golden jubilee, the workforce numbered more than 34,000, its fleet about 100 jet aircraft (including 33 Boeing 747s) and its 634,400 km network served 150 destinations in 73 countries. This made Air France the fourth-largest scheduled passenger airline in the world, as well as the second-largest scheduled freight carrier. Air France also codeshared with regional French airlines, TAT being the most prominent. TAT would later operate several regional international routes on behalf of Air France. In 1983, Air France began passenger flights to South Korea, being the first European airline to do so.

In 1986, the government relaxed its policy of dividing traffic rights for scheduled services between Air France, Air Inter and UTA, without route overlaps between them. The decision opened some of Air France's most lucrative routes on which it had enjoyed a government-sanctioned monopoly since 1963 and which were within its exclusive sphere of influence, to rival airlines, notably UTA. The changes enabled UTA to launch scheduled services to new destinations within Air France's sphere, in competition with that airline.

Paris-San Francisco became the first route UTA served in competition with Air France non-stop from Paris. Air France responded by extending some non-stop Paris-Los Angeles services to Papeete, Tahiti, which competed with UTA on Los Angeles-Papeete. UTA's ability to secure traffic rights outside its traditional sphere in competition with Air France was the result of a campaign to lobby the government to enable it to grow faster, becoming more dynamic and more profitable. This infuriated Air France.

In 1987, Air France together with Lufthansa, Iberia and SAS founded Amadeus, an IT company (also known as a GDS) that would enable travel agencies to sell the founders and other airlines' products from a single system.

In 1988, Air France was a launch customer for the fly-by-wire (FBW) Airbus A320 narrow-body twin, along with Air Inter and British Caledonian. It became the first airline to take delivery of the A320 in March 1988, and along with Air Inter, became the first airlines to introduce A320 service on short-haul routes.

=== Acquisitions and privatisation ===
On 12 January 1990, the operations of government-owned Air France, semi-public Air Inter and wholly private Union de Transports Aériens (UTA) were merged into an enlarged Air France. Air France's acquisition of UTA and Air Inter was part of an early 1990s government plan to create a unified, national air carrier with the economies of scale and global reach to counter potential threats from the liberalisation of the European Union's internal air transport market.

On 25 July 1994, a new holding company, Groupe Air France, was set up by decree. Groupe Air France became operational on 1 September 1994. It acquired the Air France group's majority shareholdings in Air France and Air Inter (subsequently renamed Air Inter Europe). On 31 August 1994, Stephen Wolf, a former United Airlines CEO, was appointed adviser to the Air France group's chairman Christian Blanc. Wolf was credited with the introduction of Air France's hub and spoke operation at Paris Charles de Gaulle. Wolf resigned in 1996 to take over as CEO at US Airways.

In 1997, Air Inter Europe was absorbed into Air France. On 19 February 1999, French Prime Minister Lionel Jospin's Plural Left government approved Air France's partial privatisation. Its shares were listed on the Paris stock exchange on 22 February 1999. In June 1999, Air France and Delta Air Lines formed a bilateral transatlantic partnership. On 22 June 2000, this expanded into the SkyTeam global airline alliance.

=== Air France–KLM merger ===
On 30 September 2003, Air France and Netherlands-based KLM Royal Dutch Airlines announced the merger of the two airlines, with the new company to be known as Air France–KLM. The merger took place on 5 May 2004. At that point former Air France shareholders owned 81% of the new firm (44% owned by the French state, 37% by private shareholders), former KLM shareholders the rest. The decision of the Jean-Pierre Raffarin government to reduce the French state's shareholding in the former Air France group from 54.4% to 44% of the newly created Air France–KLM Group effectively privatised the new airline. In December 2004, the state sold 18.4% of its equity in Air France–KLM. The state's shareholding in Air France–KLM subsequently fell to just under 20%.

Air France–KLM became the largest airline in the world in terms of operating revenues, and third-largest (largest in Europe) in passenger kilometres. Although owned by a single company, Air France and KLM continued to fly under their own brand names. Air France–KLM remained part of SkyTeam alliance, which then included Aeroflot, Delta Air Lines, Aeroméxico, Korean Air, Czech Airlines, Alitalia, Northwest Airlines, China Southern Airlines, China Eastern Airlines, China Airlines, Air Europa, Continental Airlines, Garuda Indonesia, Vietnam Airlines, Saudia, Aerolineas Argentinas, and XiamenAir. As of March 2004, the group employed 71,654 people. As of March 2007, the group employed 102,422 personnel.

=== Open Skies venture ===
On 17 October 2007, the creation of a profit and revenue-sharing transatlantic joint venture between Air France-KLM and Delta Air Lines was announced during a press conference at Air France-KLM's headquarters. The venture became effective on 29 March 2008. It aimed to exploit transatlantic opportunities to capture a major share of long-haul business traffic from London Heathrow, which opened to unrestricted competition on that day as a result of the "Open Skies" pact between the EU and US. It was envisaged that Air France and Delta would begin nine daily round trips between London-Heathrow and destinations in the US, including a daily London (Heathrow) to Los Angeles service by Air France. Once the new Air France-Delta venture received antitrust immunity, it was to be extended to the other two transatlantic SkyTeam partners, enabling all four partners to codeshare flights as well as to share revenue and profit. The new transatlantic joint venture marks the Air France-KLM Group's second major expansion in the London market, following the launch of CityJet-operated short-haul services from London City Airport that have been aimed at business travellers in the City's financial services industry. However, the daily London (Heathrow) to Los Angeles service was not as successful as hoped, and was discontinued in November 2008.

=== 2010s ===
On 12 January 2012, Air France-KLM announced a three-year transformation plan, called Transform 2015, to restore profitability. The plan was to restore competitiveness through cost-cutting, restructuring the short- and medium-haul operations and rapidly reducing debt. The main objective of this plan was to turn Air France-KLM back into a world player by 2015. Air France had been losing 700 million euros a year. As the financial results of 2011 demonstrated, the long-haul operations, also subject to increasing competition, would not be able to offset these losses. On 22 February 2012, Air France released its plan for the summer schedule. Because of the uncertain economic environment, Air France-KLM set a limit of 1.4% maximum increase in capacity from 25 March 2012 to 28 October 2012.

On 21 June 2012, Air France-KLM had announced its decision to cut just under 10% of the total 53,000 workforce (about 5,000 jobs) by the end of 2013 in an attempt to restore profitability. The airline expected to lose 1,700 jobs through natural turnover and the rest by voluntary redundancies. As of August 2012, the Transform 2015 plan was accepted by ground staff and pilot unions but rejected by cabin crew unions.

At the beginning of July 2012, it was announced that Air France-KLM found partners for the new sub-Saharan African start-up airline Air Cemac, which was co-founded by six countries in Central Africa to replace the former Air Afrique. But several problems and two partners, who decided to back out, delayed the implementation of the project. Following its launch, Air Cemac announced it would commence operations in 2013, however this never occurred and plans were cancelled in 2015.

In September 2013, Air France introduced a brand new Economy product along with an improved Premium Economy seat and service. It is expected that the new improvements would be fitted on aircraft from June 2014 onwards. In October 2013, Air France-KLM announced it was writing off the 25% stake in Alitalia, as it was hesitant the struggling carrier would obtain the 300 million euros in financing. The group has denied Alitalia of additional funds as it is currently struggling to restructure itself to profitability with the Transform 2015 plan.

In December 2013, Air France announced that Cityjet no longer meets the short haul needs of the group and is in the process of closing a deal with German firm Intro Aviation by the end of Q1 of 2014.

In 2014, the airline was targeted by a negative publicity campaign, spearheaded by PETA, for being the only major airline that permits the transport of primates for research. In 2022, the airline announced it would stop transporting nonhuman primates.

On 4 February 2014, the new business product was unveiled, featuring a fully flat bed from Zodiac Aerospace. The seat was fitted on Boeing 777 aircraft from June 2014 onwards. In September 2014, Air France announced it would sell a 3 per cent stake in travel technology company Amadeus IT Group for $438 million.

Late in 2015, Air France faced a financial crisis, which was exacerbated by a pilot's strike against the airline. The airline answered the strike by announcing it would cut some 2,900 jobs. In December 2015, Air France announced the retirement of its last Boeing 747-400 with a special scenic flight on 14 January 2016. The airline operated the 747 in several variants since 1970.

In January 2017, Air France received its first Boeing 787–9. In November, CityJet no longer operated on Air France flights and the affected destinations were served by Air France and HOP! from then on.

In July 2017, Air France-KLM entered into a multi-airline strategic partnership with Delta Air Lines, China Eastern Airlines, and Virgin Atlantic, solidifying the existing ties between the carriers. Under the agreement Delta and China Eastern would each buy 10% of Air France-KLM, while Air France-KLM would buy 31% of Virgin Atlantic. In December 2019, the purchase of Virgin Atlantic was cancelled.

Air France announced it would terminate services to Iran from September 2018, explaining the concern that, due to the redefined US sanctions, the route to Iran would be no longer commercially viable. In December 2018, Anne Rigail was appointed as Executive Director of the company.

== Corporate affairs and identity ==
=== Head office ===
The head office of Air France in Roissypôle, Charles de Gaulle Airport, Tremblay-en-France

Air France's head office is located in the Roissypôle complex on the grounds of Charles de Gaulle Airport and in the commune of Tremblay-en-France, Seine-Saint-Denis, near the city of Paris. Wil S. Hylton of The New York Times described the facility as "a huge white box that squats near the runways at Charles de Gaulle Airport."

The 130,000-square-metre (1,400,000 sq ft) complex was completed in December 1995. The French firm Groupement d'Etudes et de Méthodes d'Ordonnancement (GEMO) managed the project. The architect was Valode & Pistre and the design consultants were Sechaud-Boyssut and Trouvin. The project cost 137,000,000 euros (less than 700 million francs). The runways of the airport are visible from the building. The Air France Operations Control Centre (OCC, French: Centre de Contrôle des Opérations, CCO), which coordinates Air France flights worldwide, is situated at the AF head office.

For about 30 years prior to December 1995, Air France's headquarters were located in a tower adjacent to the Gare Montparnasse rail station in the Montparnasse area and the 15th arrondissement of Paris. By 1991, two bids for the purchase of the Square Max Hymans building had been made. By 1992, the complex was sold to Mutuelle générale de l'Éducation nationale (MGEN) for 1.6 billion francs. By that year, Air France had planned to move its head office to Roissypôle, taking 50,000 square metres (540,000 sq ft) of space inside the hotel, office, and shopping complex on the grounds of Charles de Gaulle Airport. After Air France moved to Tremblay-en-France, the ownership of the former head office complex was transferred.

On a previous occasion, the head office was at 2 rue marbeuf in the 8th arrondissement of Paris.

=== Foreign offices ===
Air France's United States offices are in the 125 West 55th Street building in Midtown Manhattan, New York City. Air France first signed a lease to occupy the building in 1991. The site also formerly housed the New York City ticket office for Air France.

Air France-KLM's head office for the United Kingdom and Ireland operations, which includes facilities for Air France and KLM, is located in Plesman House in Hatton Cross. The facility's inauguration was on 6 July 2006. Air France moved the office from Hounslow to Hatton.

In London, the airline also operated a storefront ticket-office for prospective passengers in 158 New Bond Street from the late 1950s to the early 1990s but moved to 177 Piccadilly, French Railways House, which was also the venue of Maison de La France, the French Government Tourist Office, until closure in the mid 2000s.

=== Crew base ===
Air France Cité PN, located at Charles de Gaulle Airport, acts as the airline's crew base. The building, developed by Valode & Pistre, opened in February 2006. The first phase consisted of 33,400 square metres (360,000 sq ft) of space and 4,300 parking spaces. The building is connected to the Air France head office.

=== Vaccination centre ===
Until 2022, Air France operated the Air France Vaccinations Center in the 7th arrondissement of Paris. The centre distributed vaccines for international travel. Since 2001, the centre was the only French vaccination centre certified International Organization for Standardization (ISO) 9001. In 2005, the centre moved from the Aérogare des Invalides to its current location. In late 2022, Air France sold its vaccination centre to Elsan.

=== Aérogare des Invalides ===
The Aérogare des Invalides in the 7th arrondissement of Paris houses the Agence Air France Invalides and the Air France Museum. Until 2005, the building hosted the Air France Vaccinations Centre. On 28 August 1959, Air France opened a ticket and information agency in the former air terminal in Invalides, targeting transit passengers and customers from offices and companies in the Invalides area.

=== Subsidiaries and franchises ===
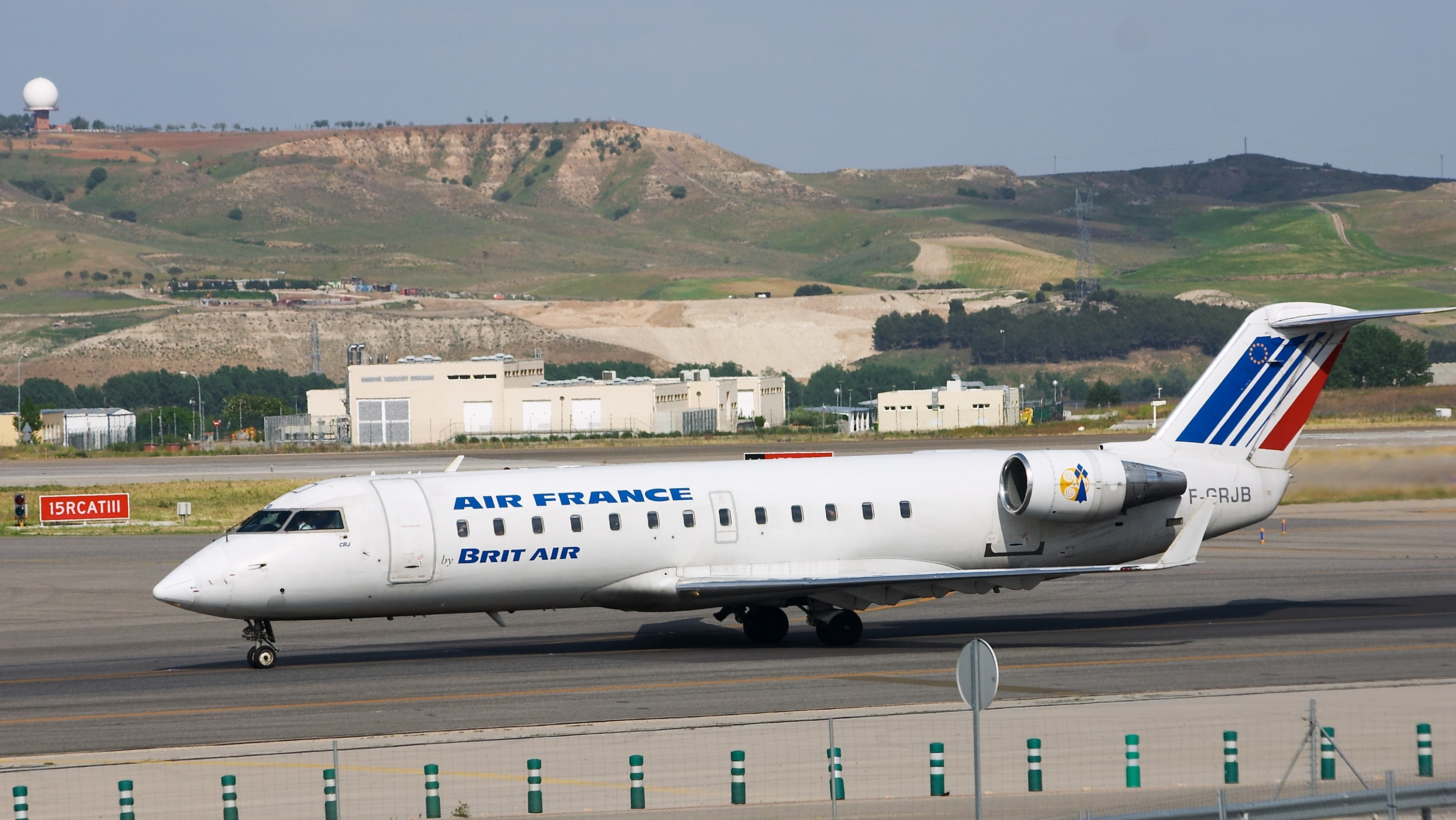
Air France regional jet operated by Brit Air, now Air France Hop

The subsidiaries of Air France include:

- Transavia France
- Air France Hop (formerly called HOP!)
- Air France Consulting
  - Quali-audit
- BlueLink
- Servair
- Société de construction et de réparation de matériel aéronautique (CRMA) : A subsidiary of the AIR FRANCE-KLM Group, based in Elancourt, France.
- Sodexi

Air France and Dutch affiliate Transavia formed Transavia France, a low-cost joint venture in May 2007, based at Orly Airport. Air Corsica and Air France Hop all operate flights on behalf of Air France, either as subsidiaries or as franchisees.

As of January 2019, Air France was investigating how it could shut down its low-cost subsidiary Joon and absorb its employees and aircraft into the parent company.

=== Air France Asie and Air France Cargo Asie ===
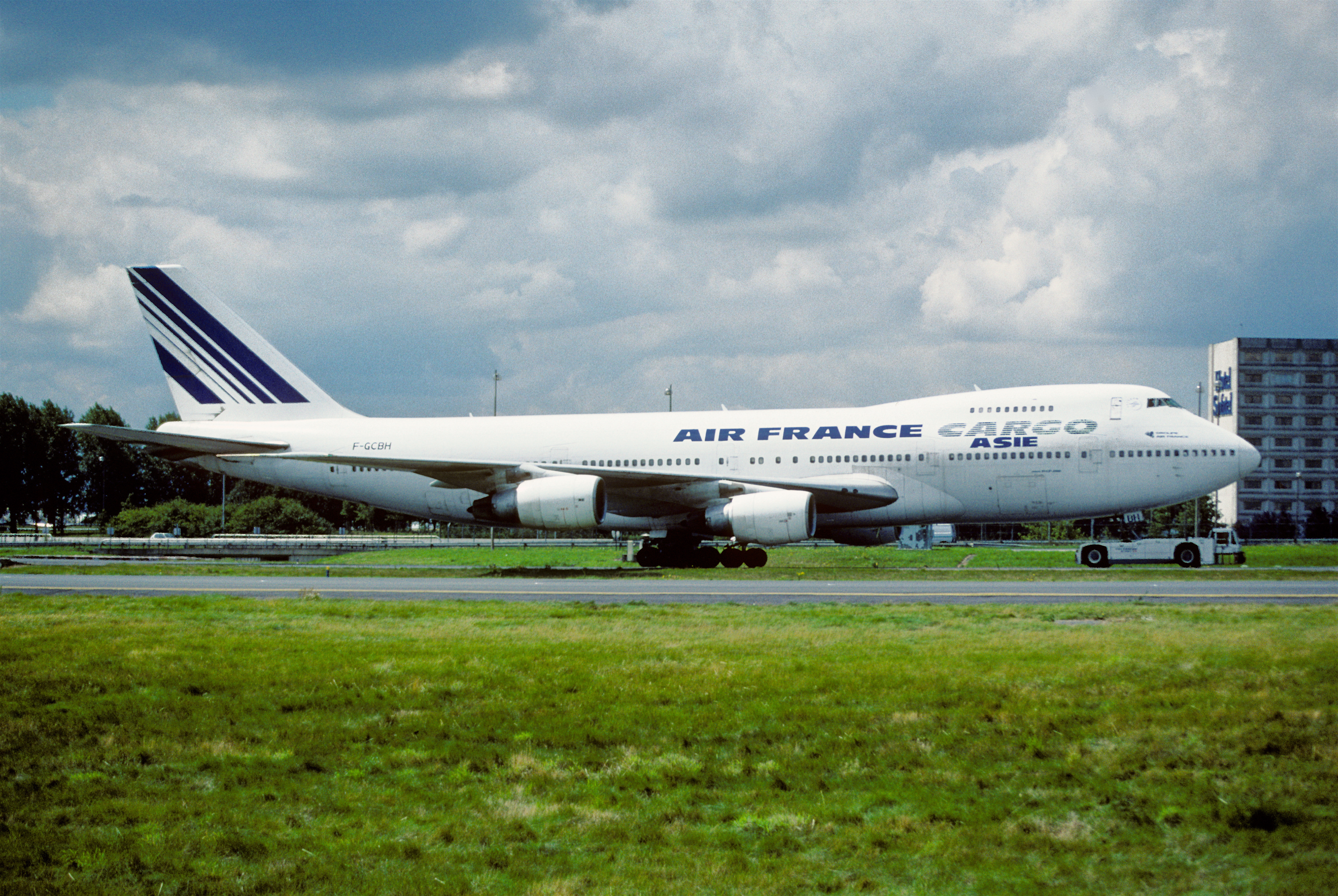
Air France Cargo Asie Boeing 747-200F

Owing to the disputed status of Taiwan, Air France could not operate flights to the island under its own name. In 1993, its subsidiary, Air Charter, began operating flights between Paris and Taipei via Hong Kong, but after Air Charter ceased operations in 1998, a subsidiary called Air France Asie was established. The airline was one of a number of airline subsidiaries flying under the "Asia" name with the purpose of flying to Taiwan, which included Japan Asia Airways (a Japan Airlines subsidiary), KLM Asia, British Asia Airways, Swissair Asia, and Australia Asia Airlines (a Qantas subsidiary).

The livery of Air France Asie differed from that of Air France by having blue and white stripes on the tailfin, rather than blue, white and red ones, representing the French Tricolour. Air France Asie used two Airbus A340-200 aircraft, F-GLZD and F-GLZE, and two Boeing 747-428Ms, F-GISA and F-GISC. Similarly, Air France Cargo Asie used a 747–200 Combi (for passengers and freight), F-GCBH) or the all-cargo (F-GCBL, F-GPAN and F-GBOX). Air France Asie ceased operations in 2004 while Air France Cargo Asie ceased operations in 2007.

=== Outsourcing ===
In 2010, Air France migrated from an internally managed passenger service system (Alpha3) that manages reservation, inventory and pricing to an external system (Altéa) managed by Amadeus. In rail ventures, Air France and Veolia are looking into jointly operating high-speed rail services in Europe. Routes have become available to operators in accordance with European rail liberalisation on 1 January 2010.

=== Livery ===
Air France's present livery is a "Eurowhite" scheme, comprising a white fuselage with the blue Air France title and design. The tail is white with a series of parallel red and blue lines across the tail at an angle, and a small European flag at the top. The engines have the old Air France (and formerly Air Orient) logo painted on, though only on newer aircraft. This livery has been in use since the late 1970s. Prior to the "Eurowhite" livery, Air France aircraft had a bare-metal underside, extending up to a blue cheat-line that ran across the cabin windows. Above the cheat-line the fuselage was again white, with Air France titles and a French flag. The tail was white with two thick blue lines, which tapered from the rear of the tail and met at a point towards the front bottom. This basic livery, with minor variations, would appear on all post-war Air France aircraft until the late 1970s.

In January 2009, to coincide with Air France's new logo, a new livery was unveiled. Air France rolled out its new livery on 11 February 2009. The 2009 livery saw the tail slightly changed; there are now three blue bars running down instead of the previous four. The bars also now curve at the bottom, reflecting the design of the logo. In 2017, Air France received their first Boeing 787 with a revised livery which included larger Air France titles. In 2019, Air France revised the livery with the arrival of the Airbus A350, with blue winglets featuring the hippocampe ailé. This coincided with reintroducing the practice of naming each of their aircraft, with the name written under the front cabin windows; the first A350-900 was named after the city of Toulouse. In 2021, Air France once again revised the livery, while most elements were still identical to the 2019 version, the hippocampe ailé icon is now added between cockpit windows and front cabin doors, replacing the SkyTeam logo. The aircraft type, SkyTeam logo and Air France-KLM logo now feature at the back of the fuselage.

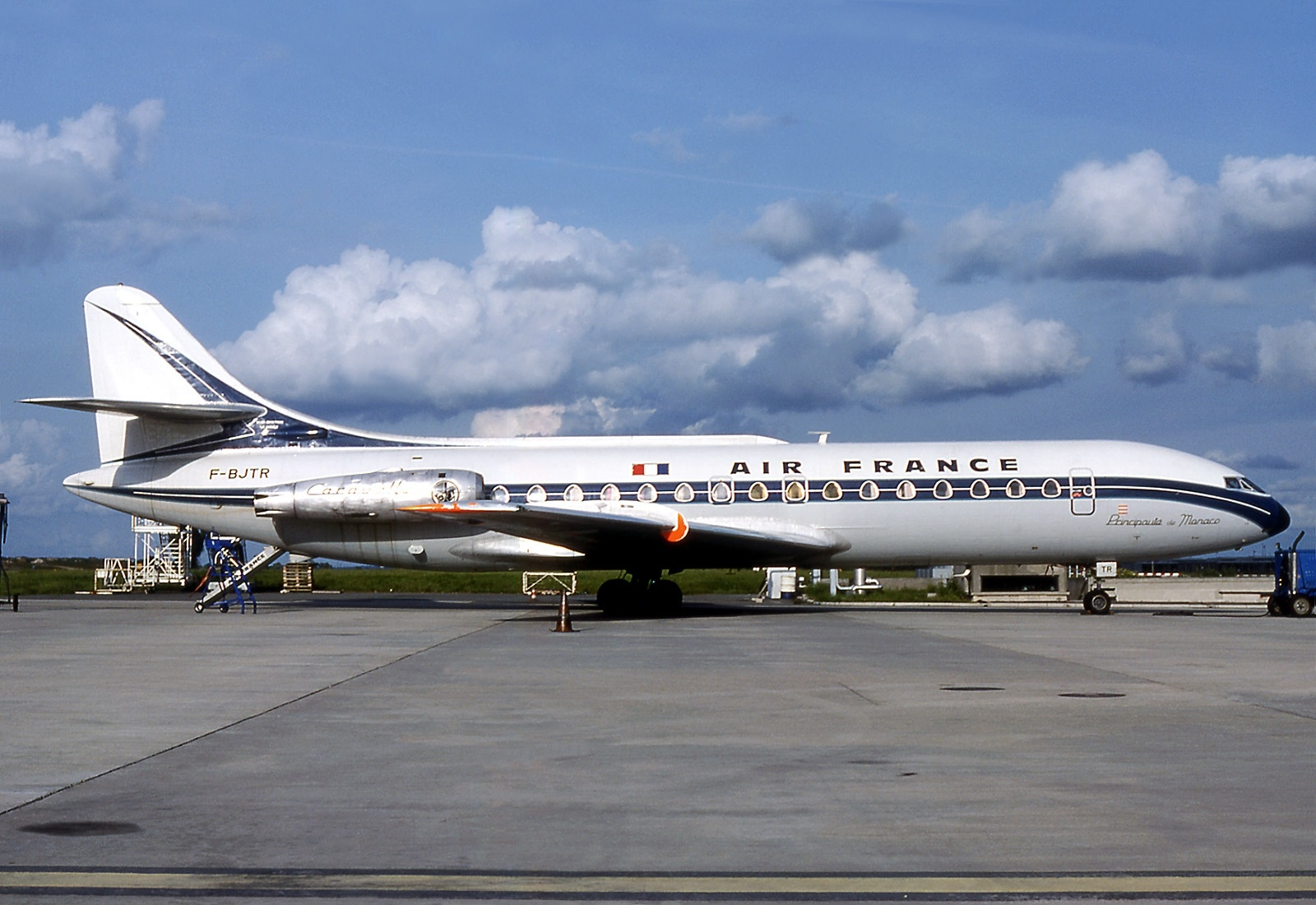
Air France Sud Aviation Caravelle in the oldest Livery

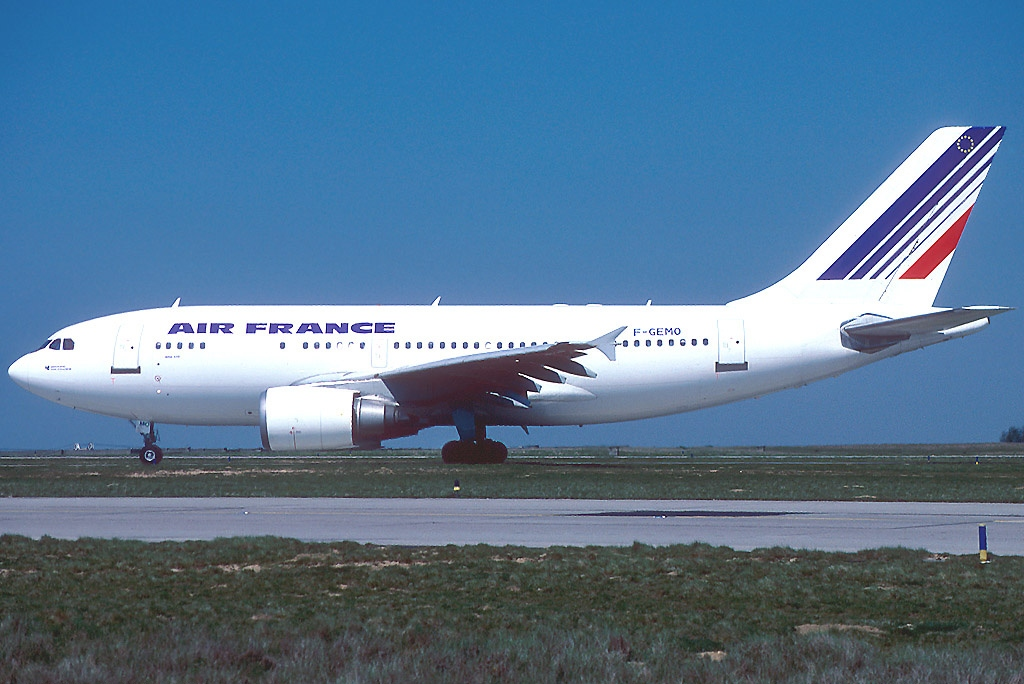
Air France Airbus A310 in the 1976 livery

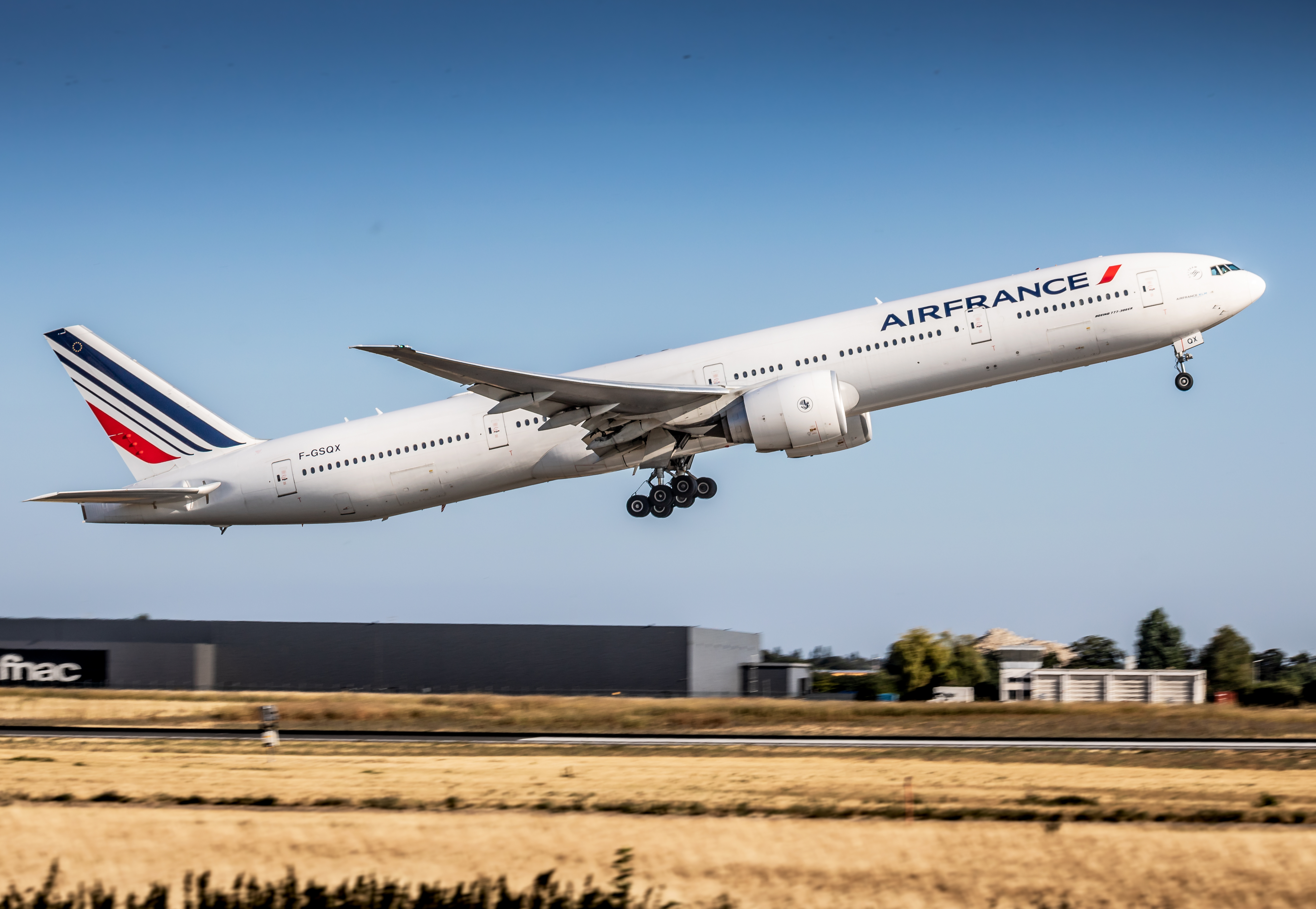
Air France Boeing 777 in the 2009 livery

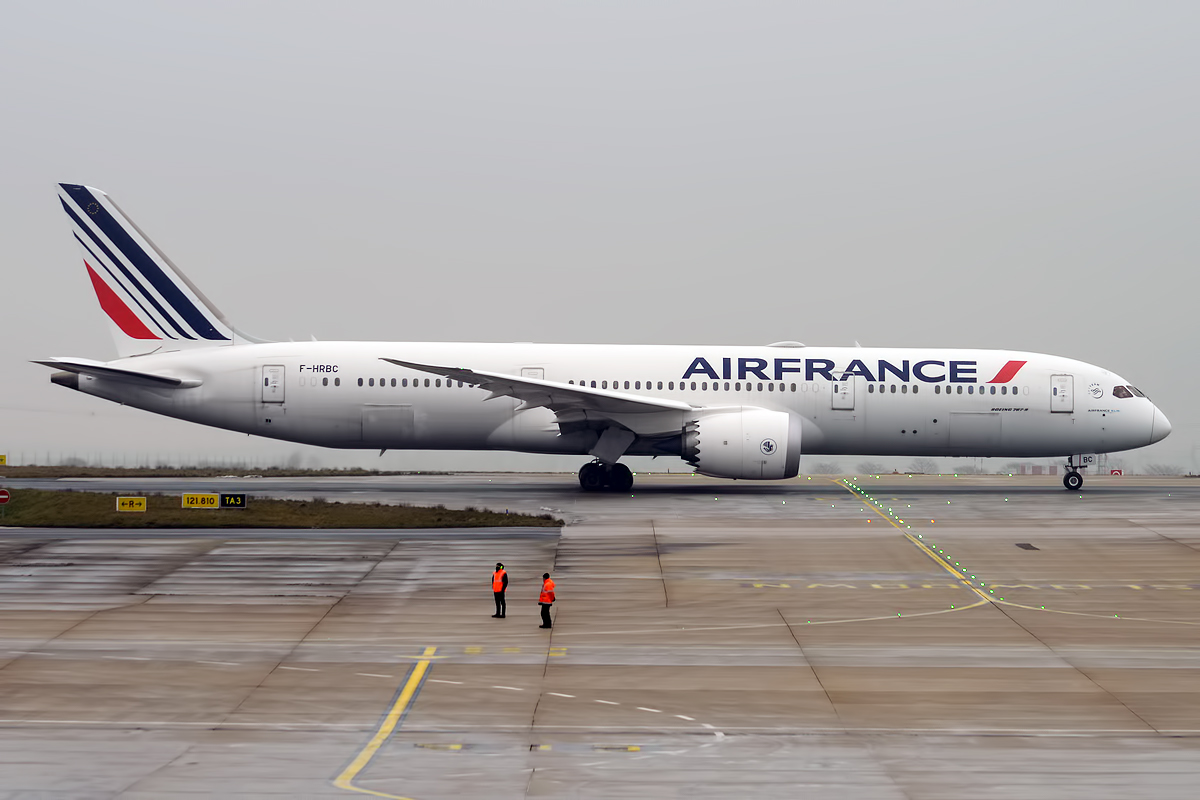
Air France Boeing 787 in the 2017 revised livery

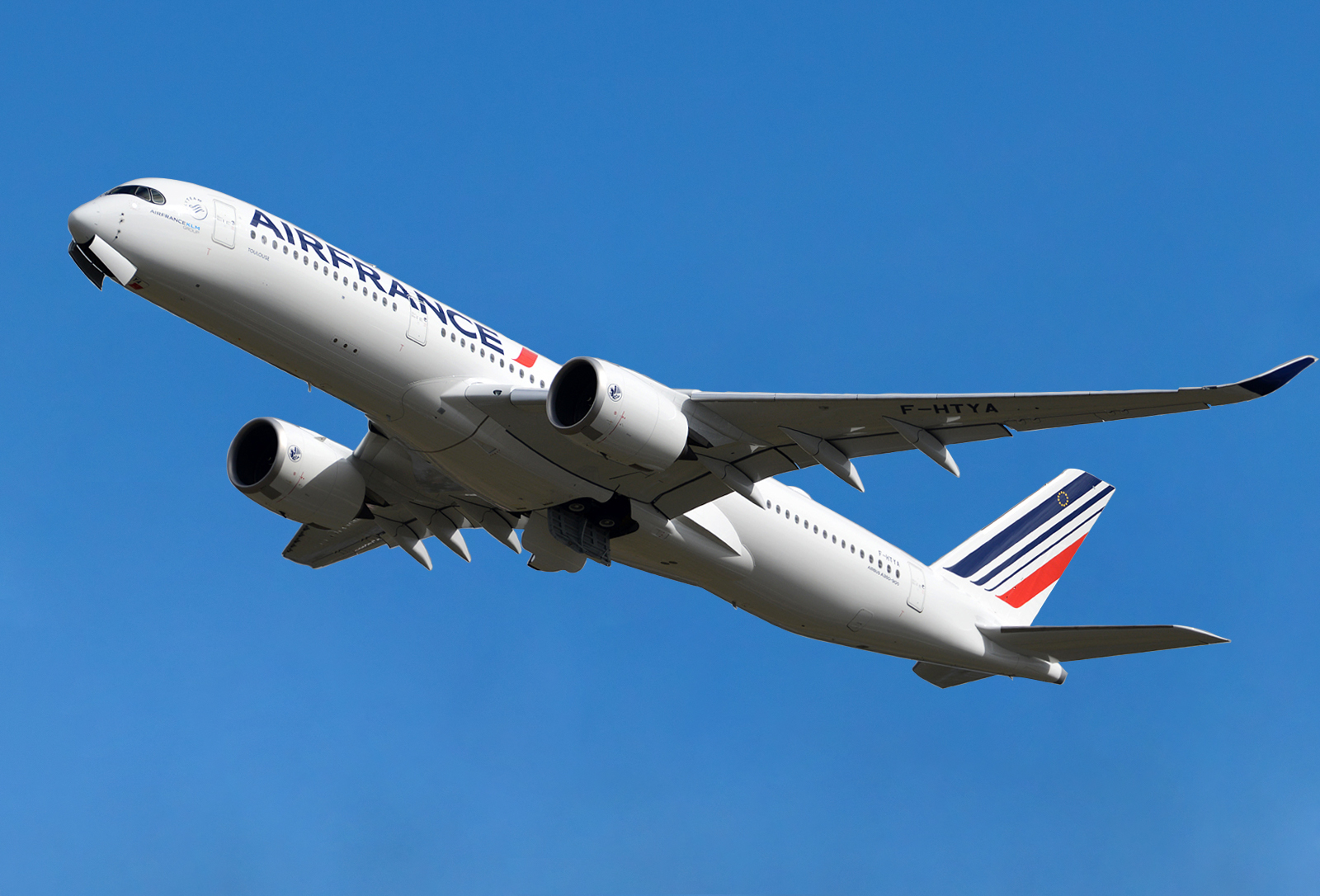
Air France Airbus A350 in the 2019 revised livery

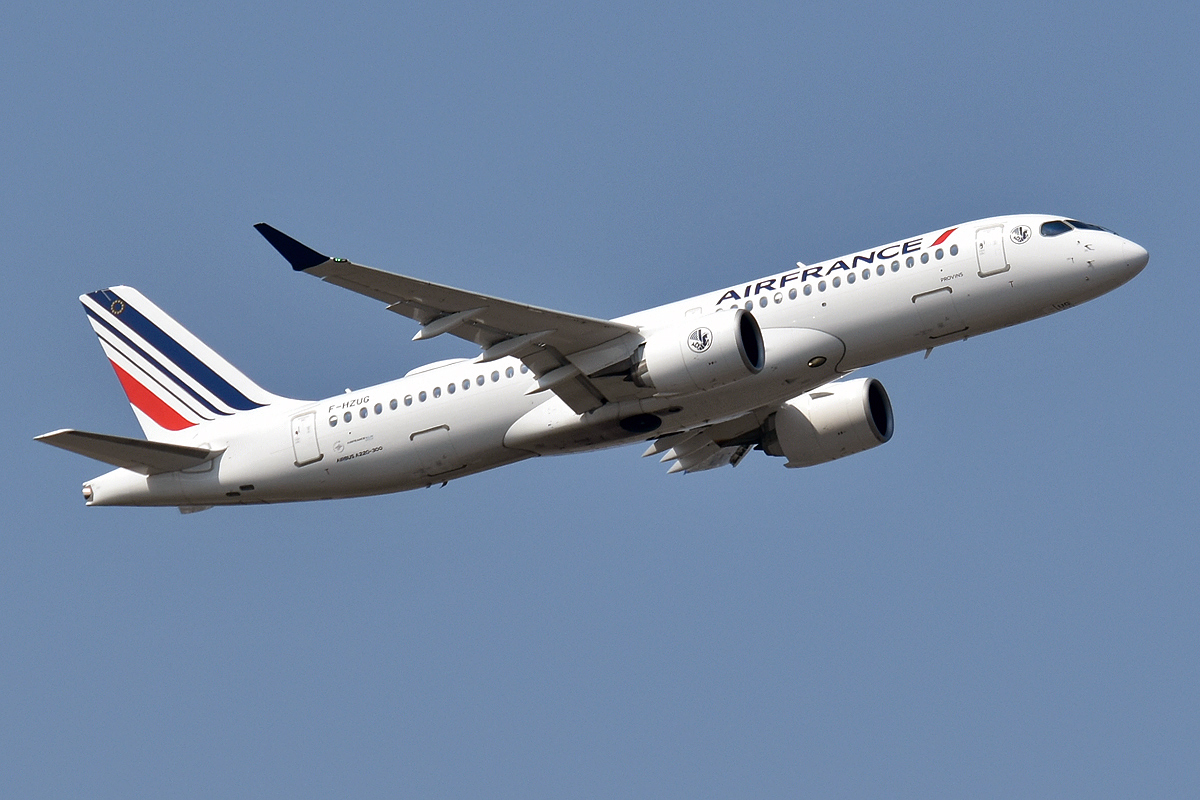
Air France Airbus A220 in the 2021 revised livery

=== Marketing ===
In the 1950s and 1960s, graphic designer Jean Carlu produced promotional posters for Air France.

The new official song played before and after Air France flights (during boarding and after landing) is 'The World Can Be Yours' by Telepopmusik. Air France has used different popular music groups for its marketing and on-board ambience, ranging from The Chemical Brothers in 1999 to Telepopmusik in 2010.

Air France launched a new ad campaign in 2015 designed by BETC and directed by We Are From LA, focusing on French culture. Along with the ad campaign and print ads, Air France also introduced a similarly themed safety video. The music is a customised version of Glass Candy's song Warm in the Winter.

=== Uniforms ===
Air France uniforms denote the ranks for the flight attendants. Two silver sleeve stripes denote a senior Purser. One silver sleeve stripe denote a Purser. Flight attendants do not have any sleeve stripes. The female cabin crew uniforms feature the stripes on the breast pocket rather than the sleeve for their male counterparts. Air France's current uniforms were created by French fashion designer Christian Lacroix.

=== Branding ===
Upon its formation, Air France adopted the seahorse logo of its predecessor Air Orient, known as the hippocampe ailé (sometimes derisively called "la crevette" – or shrimp – by its employees), as its insignia. Prior to the Air France-KLM merger, the hippocampe ailé was used on the nose section of aircraft next to the Groupe Air France title; after the merger, the Air France-KLM logo was substituted at the nose area, and the hippocampe ailé was relocated to engine nacelles. The acronym "AF" has also featured prominently on the airline's flag and its signage. On 7 January 2009, Air France officially changed its logo to a red stripe.

== Destinations ==
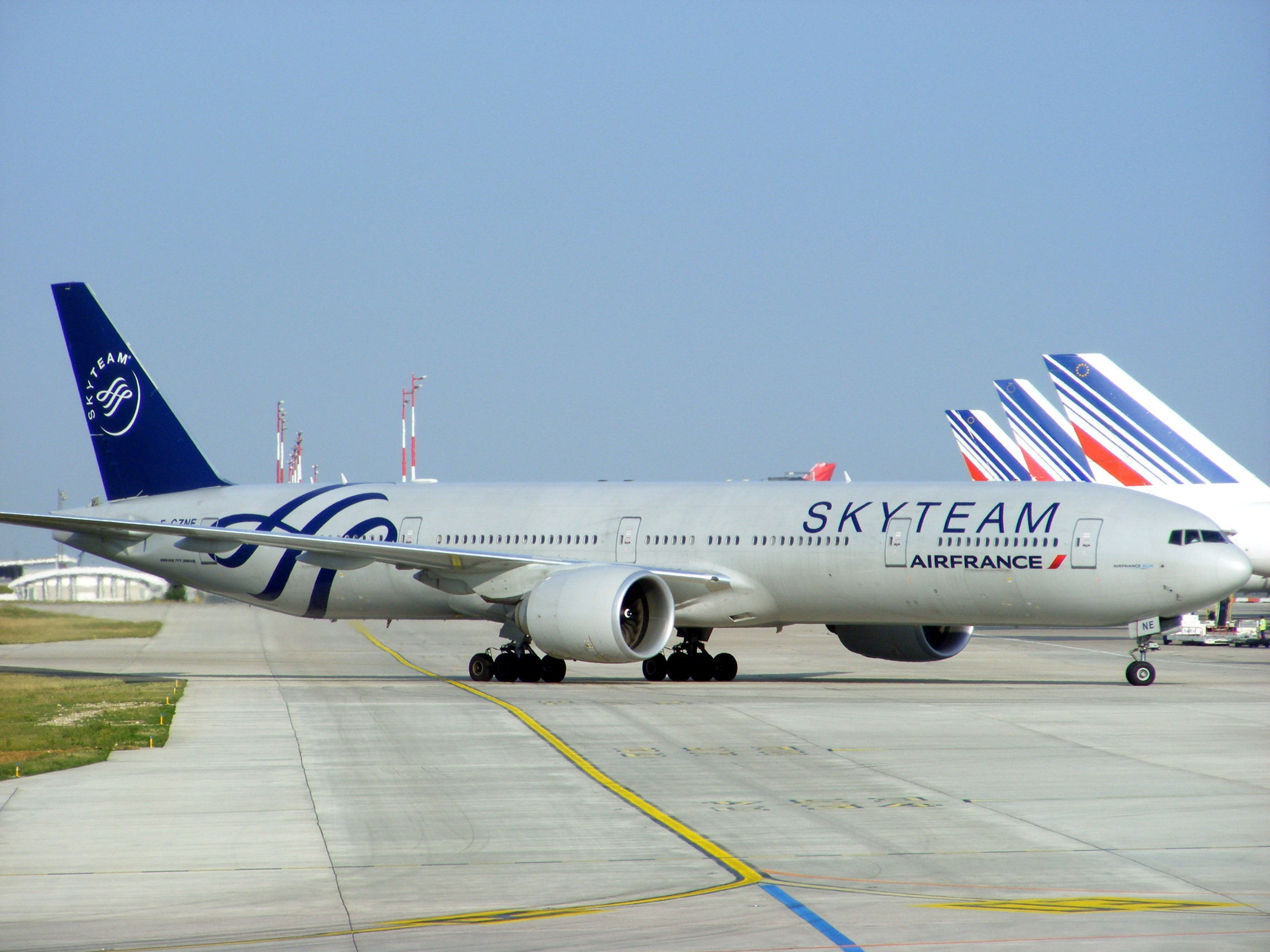
Air France Boeing 777-300ER specially painted in SkyTeam livery to commemorate the airline's membership

As of 2022, Air France flies to 29 domestic destinations and 201 international destinations in 94 countries (including overseas departments and territories of France) across six continents, including 19 in the United States and 16 in Italy. This includes Air France Cargo services and destinations served by franchisees Air Corsica, and Air France HOP. Most of Air France's international flights operate from Paris-Charles de Gaulle. Air France also has a strong presence at the following French airports: Lyon-Saint-Exupéry, Marseille Provence, Toulouse Blagnac and Nice Côte d'Azur.

=== Hub information ===
- Charles de Gaulle Airport: Air France's primary intercontinental and domestic hub, with 335 daily departures. It also serves as an operating base for its subsidiary, Air France HOP.

=== Codeshare agreements ===
Air France codeshares with the following airlines:

- Aerolíneas Argentinas
- Aeroméxico
- Air Astana
- Air Austral
- Air Burkina
- Aircalin
- Air Côte d'Ivoire
- Air Corsica
- Amelia
- Air Europa
- Airlink
- Air Mauritius
- Air Serbia
- Air Tahiti Nui
- Atlantic Airways
- airBaltic
- Azerbaijan Airlines
- Azores Airlines
- Bangkok Airways
- Bulgaria Air
- Chalair Aviation
- China Airlines
- China Eastern Airlines
- China Southern Airlines
- Copa Airlines
- Croatia Airlines
- Delta Air Lines
- El Al
- Finnair
- Garuda Indonesia
- Georgian Airways
- Gol Linhas Aéreas Inteligentes
- IndiGo
- ITA Airways
- Japan Airlines
- Kenya Airways
- KLM
- KM Malta Airlines
- Korean Air
- LATAM Brasil
- Luxair
- Madagascar Airlines
- Middle East Airlines
- Qantas
- Saudia
- Scandinavian Airlines
- Singapore Airlines
- SNCF (railway)
- TAAG Angola Airlines
- TAROM
- Vietnam Airlines
- Virgin Atlantic
- WestJet
- Widerøe
- Winair
- XiamenAir

=== Interline agreements ===
Air France has interline agreements with the following airlines:

- AeroItalia
- APG Airlines
- Air Astana
- Airlink
- CemAir
- Copa Airlines
- flydubai
- KLM
- Loganair
- MIAT Mongolian Airlines
- Pakistan International Airlines
- Royal Brunei Airlines
- Scandinavian Airlines
- Sky Airline
- Swiss International Air Lines

== Fleet ==
=== Wide-body fleet ===
On 16 September 2011, Air France-KLM announced orders for 50 Airbus A350s and Boeing 787s with 60 options, to be operated by both Air France and KLM. Air France-KLM committed 37 Boeing 787s, 25 directly and 12 leased, of which 16 are earmarked for Air France to replace some A340-300s, subsequent A340s would be replaced by Airbus A350s from 2019. The first Boeing 787-9 entered into service with KLM in 2015 and with Air France in early 2017. Air France-KLM had 28 A350s on firm order.

In June 2019, the group announced a revision of the original order with Air France becoming the sole operator of the Airbus A350, with KLM only operating Boeing 787s, including six originally earmarked for Air France. The first Airbus A350-900 (named Toulouse) was delivered to Air France on 27 September 2019.

The Air France-KLM Group confirmed firm orders for the Airbus A350F in two stages: initially for Air France, with a firm order placed on 12 April 2022 (following a December 2021 Letter of Intent) for 4 aircraft, and later for Martinair (KLM Cargo), with a firm order for 4 additional aircraft announced on 27 January 2023, however in March 2025, the group reduced its commitment from eight to six amid the delayed freighter's entry into service.

In September 2023 Air France-KLM announced an order for 50 Airbus A350 900 and A350 1000 with combined options for 40 more with deliveries scheduled for 2026, which will be allocated to both Air France and KLM to replace their aging Airbus A330 and Boeing 777 200ER aircraft.

In August 2025 the Group converted eight of the 11 -1000 orders to the -900 variant for better flexibility across the group.

=== Narrow-body fleet ===
Air France operates a fleet of all four variants of the Airbus A320 family aircraft with a total of 114 jets. In July 2019, a first order was announced as part of replacing its narrow-body fleet. The smaller Airbus A318 and A319 fleet will be replaced by 60 Airbus A220-300s starting in 2021. Air France would have to cut emission by half by 2024 for flights within mainland France as part of conditions of a €7 billion state support from France. As a result, Air France plans to place more Airbus A220 aircraft onto its domestic network.

=== Concorde ===
The five Air France Concordes were retired on 31 May 2003, as a result of insufficient demand following the 25 July 2000 crash of AF Concorde F-BTSC, at Gonesse (near Charles de Gaulle Airport), as well as higher fuel and maintenance costs. British Airways flew its last Concorde service on 24 October 2003. Concorde F-BVFA was transferred to the Steven F. Udvar-Hazy Center at Washington Dulles International Airport. F-BVFB was given to the Sinsheim Auto & Technik Museum in Germany, F-BTSD to the Musée de l'Air et de l'Espace at Le Bourget Airport in Paris, while F-BVFC returned to its place of manufacture in Toulouse, at the Airbus factory. F-BVFF is the only example to remain at Charles de Gaulle Airport.

=== Boeing 747 ===
The airline started operating the Boeing 747 on 3 June 1970, when a 747-100 was put into service that was delivered on 20 March that year. It would go on to operate the -200, -300 and -400 variants. In January 2016, Air France finally retired its last Boeing 747-400. They were replaced by Airbus A380 and Boeing 777-300ER aircraft. Freighter versions were replaced by Boeing 777Fs.

== Cabins ==
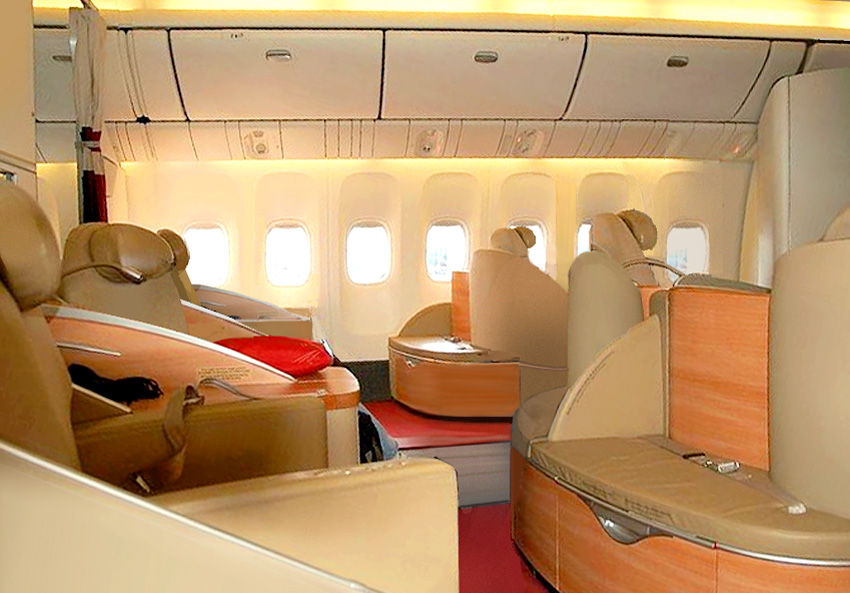
La Première seats on one of Air France's Boeing 777s

Air France offers a mix of three and four cabin configurations for international long haul routes, featuring La Première (select aircraft), Business, Premium Economy and Economy. Personal screens with audio video on demand is available in all cabins on all long-haul aircraft. European short-haul and medium-haul flights feature a three cabin configuration with Business, Premium Economy, and Economy.

=== La Première ===
La Première is Air France's long-haul first class product. It is available on selected Boeing 777-300ERs. The Première cabin features wood and leather seats which recline 180°, forming two-metre long beds. Each seat features a 10.4" touchscreen personal screen with interactive gaming and audio video on demand, a privacy divider, automassage feature, reading light, storage drawer, noise-cancelling headphones, personal telephone, and laptop power ports. Each passenger is also provided with a personalised coat service, pure merino wool blanket, a "boudoir-style" cushion, and a travel kit featuring Biologique Recherche facial and body care products to moisturise and refresh the skin. Turndown service includes a mattress, a duvet, hypoallergenic feather pillow, sleepwear, a dust bag for shoes, and a pair of slippers À la carte on-demand meal services feature entrées created by Chef Guy Martin in the air. On the ground, a three-course menu created by chef Alain Ducasse is available at the exclusive lounge in Paris. Private lounge access is offered worldwide featuring a chauffeured car to the aircraft. La Première is not available on Airbus A330s, A350s, and most Boeing 777s, on which Business is the highest cabin class. Four-class 777-300ER configurations are equipped with four seats. Air France is also planning to introduce an updated version of La Première in 2025, with the Airbus A350-900 being a potential aircraft to be equipped with the updated cabin. The new La Première experience has been introduced in March 2025 and will equip the Boeing 777-300ER. The new private suite offers five windows and occupies 3.5 square metres (38 sq ft). The seat can be transformed into a 2-metre-long (7 ft) bed. The first flight with the new cabin flew from Paris to New York JFK on 8 April 2025.

=== Business ===
Business, Air France's long-haul business class product, is available on all long haul aircraft. Business features angled lie-flat seats which recline to two metres in length. Each seat includes a 10.4" touchscreen TV monitor with interactive gaming and AVOD, reading light, personal telephone, and laptop power ports. Meal service features three-course meals and a cheese service, or an express menu served shortly after takeoff.

The current business class product features Zodiac Aerospace Cirrus seats is designed by Mark Collins of Design Investment, specialised in the world of high-end transportation and by the design and branding agency, Brandimage. Initially debuting on Boeing 777s in June 2014, they were retrofitted onto all other aircraft types except for the Boeing 747-400, Airbus A380s, and Airbus A340-300 as they were to be retired from the fleet by 2016, 2019, and 2020 respectively. A total of 2,102 seats would be installed. The new cabin features a 1-2-1 layout as opposed to a 2-3-2 layout previously used on 777s or the 2-2-2 seat configuration of the Airbus A330s. The new 16-inch (41 cm) screen offers a unique onboard navigation experience similar to a tablet. With a completely redesigned user interface and available in 12 languages (French, English, Spanish, Brazilian Portuguese, Chinese, Japanese, Korean, German, Italian, Dutch, Russian and Arabic), choosing an entertainment program from over 1,000 hours of entertainment. The seat converts into a fully flat bed with 180 degrees recline, and features a touchscreen remote control, USB port, universal electrical outlet, new noise cancelling headphones, privacy screen, an Air France signature padded headboard, ample storage space, adjustable headrest, and a duvet with XXL feather down pillow.

=== Premium Economy ===
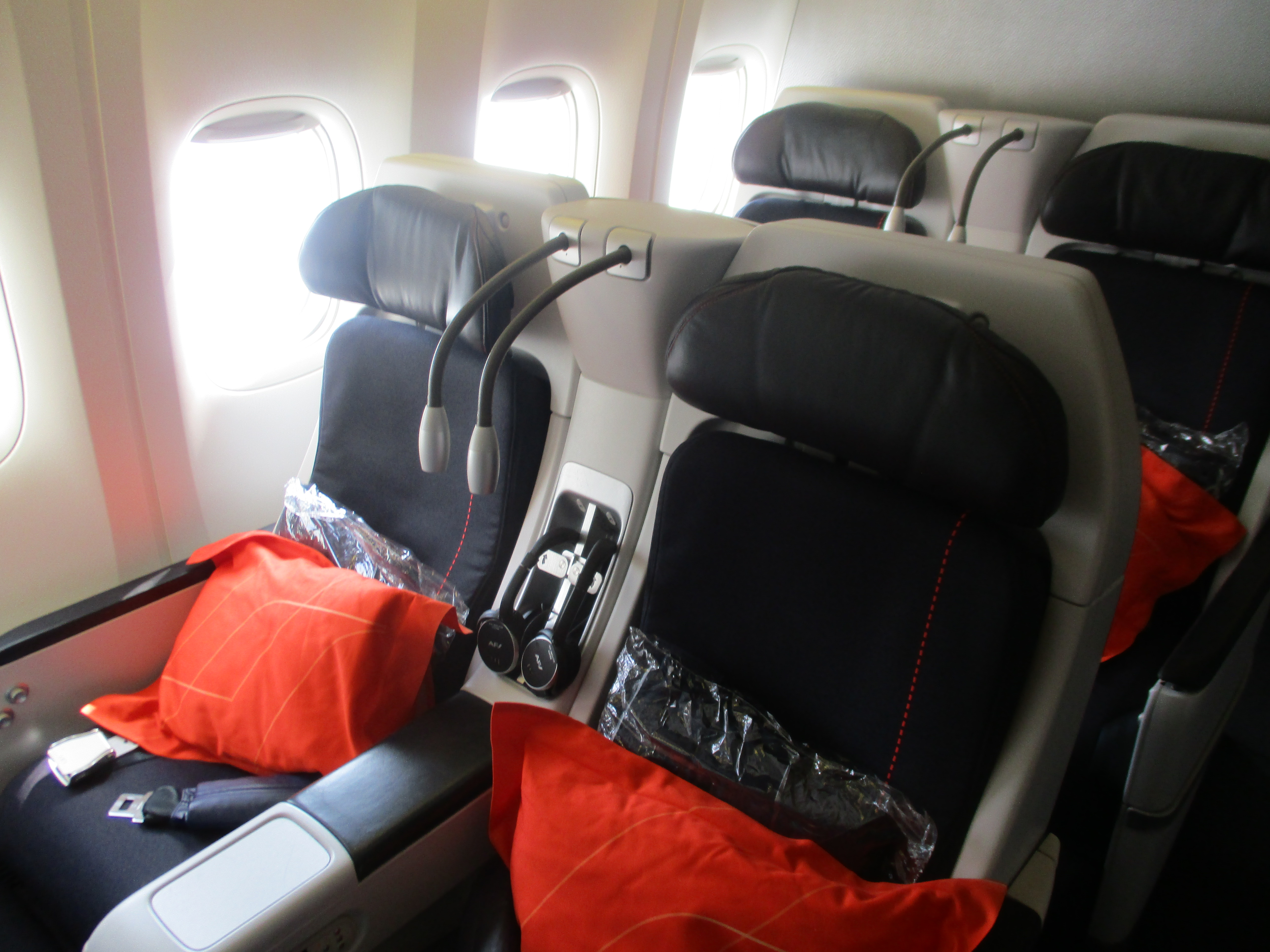
Premium Economy seats on a refurbished Air France Boeing 777-200ER

Premium Economy is featured on all long-haul flights. This cabin made its debut on Boeing 777s and Airbus A330s beginning in late 2009 and early 2010. The seats were also installed on Airbus A340-300s between late 2009 and early 2010 and the Airbus A380s in late 2010 and early 2011. It is a dedicated cabin section with a 2-4-2 (2-3-2 on the long haul Airbus fleet and 3-3-3 for Alize on the 777-300 serving Indian Ocean and Caribbean routes) configuration with 38-inch (97 cm) pitch (36 inches [91 cm] for long-haul Alize seats), 123° reclining fixed-shell seats, including an adjustable headrest, a 10.4″ touchscreen, personal reading lamp, universal power ports, and an adjustable leg rest (40% more space, compared to Voyageur seats; the seats are 20% wider and offer 20% more legroom). This cabin contains 32 seats on Boeing 777-300ERs, 24 on Boeing 777-200ERs and Airbus A350-900s, and 21 on Airbus A330-200s and Boeing 787-9s. Passengers receive double baggage allowance, priority airport services, lounge access (for a fee), and extra frequent flier mileage. On board, business-class amenities include Sennheiser noise-cancelling headphones, an amenity kit (featuring socks, eye mask, toothbrush & toothpaste, and earplugs), improved blankets, and an enhanced meal service with second hot meal, candies, and ice cream, all served with real glass and metal cutlery. A new improved Premium Economy seat using the same shell was introduced from June 2014 on the Boeing 777 aircraft, featuring better cushioning and improved foot rest, adding comfort to the passenger.

=== Economy ===
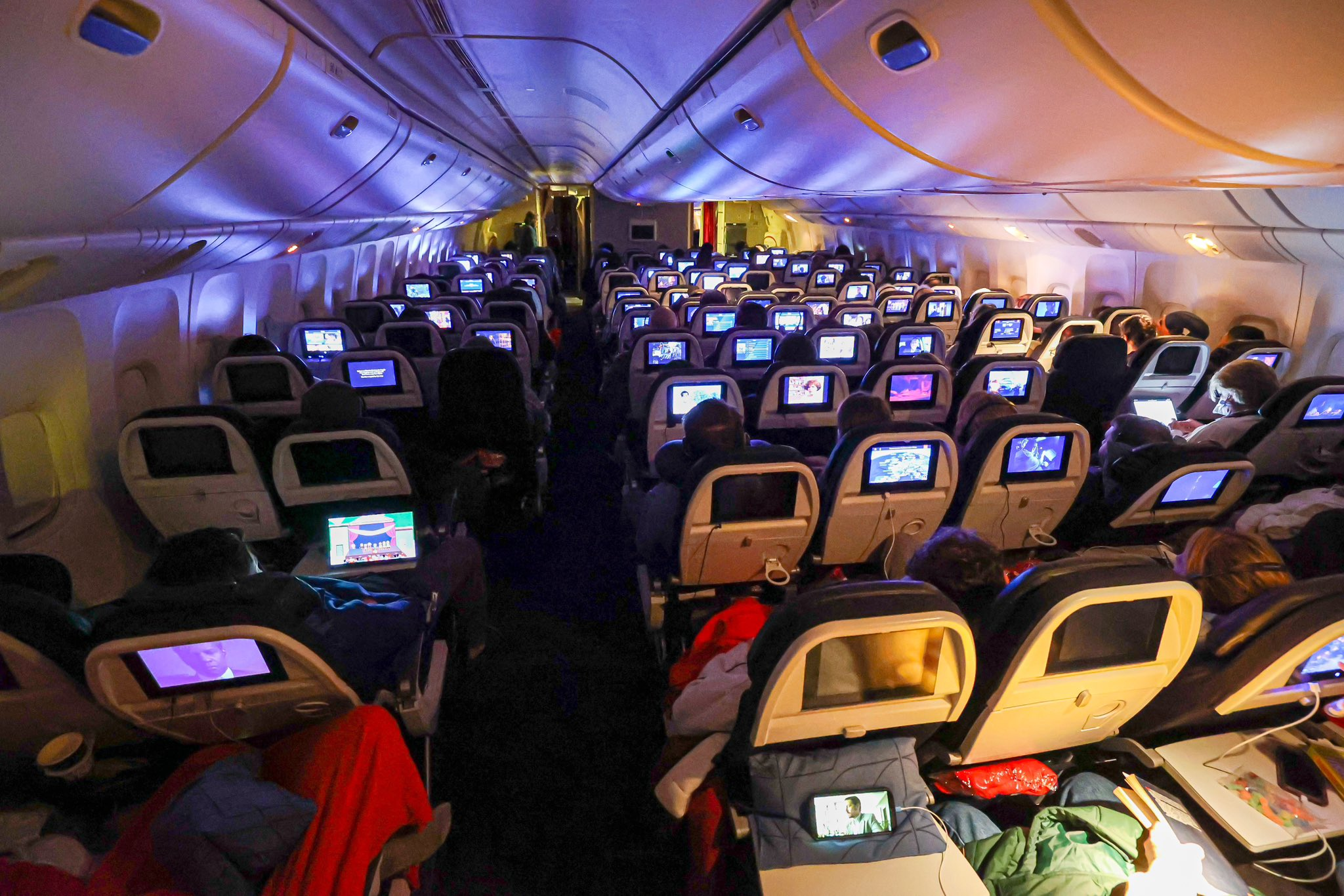
Economy cabin on an Air France Boeing 777-300ER

Air France's economy class long-haul product features seats that recline up to 118°. The current long-haul Economy seat, which debuted on the Boeing 777-300ER, includes winged headrests, a personal telephone, and a touchscreen TV monitor with AVOD Interactive Entertainment System which have been installed on all of Air France's long-haul fleet. On long-haul flights, a menu is presented with a choice of two meals. Short- and medium-haul Economy services are operated by Airbus A320 family aircraft with different seating arrangements. Air France is one of the few airlines who features winged headrests on short-to-medium-haul aircraft in both classes. On short-haul flights, a snack is served, while on medium-haul flights, a three-course cold meal is served. Free alcoholic beverages are available on all flights, including champagne. On most aircraft, Air France offers extra-legroom seats in economy called Seat Plus. These seats are located in the economy-class exit rows and other rows depending on the aircraft type, offering at least 4 inches (10 cm) more seat pitch (36 inches [91 cm] versus the usual 32 inches [81 cm] in standard economy seats). Seat Plus prices vary by flight time, but it is free to elites and passengers with a full-fare economy ticket.

Air France has introduced a brand-new economy long-haul product which features a new slimline seat providing up to an inch more legroom, wider table, universal electrical sockets, retractable armrests, winged leather headrests, more storage space, high-definition 10-inch screens featuring the latest in-flight entertainment with a USB port, a headphones holder, and newly designed pillows featuring different patterns of the Air France logo. The seats would be installed along with the new La Première, Business, and Premium Economy seats from June 2014 till summer 2016 on the Boeing 777 aircraft, the core of the fleet. All other aircraft would be retrofitted except the Airbus A340-300s, Airbus A380-800s, and Boeing 747-400s, as all three types would be retired by 2020.

== Services ==
=== In-flight catering ===
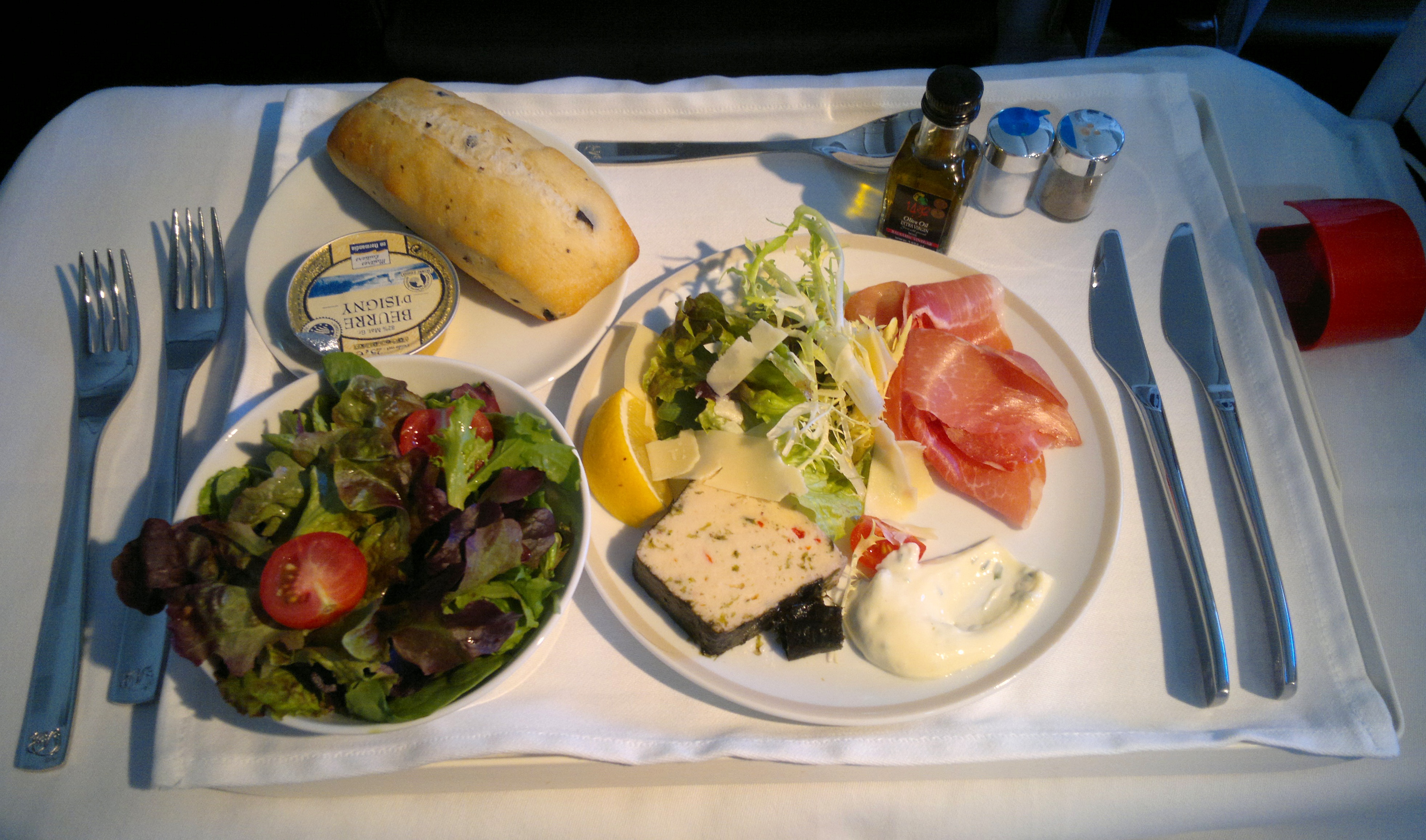
A gourmet appetiser and seasonal salad served in Air France's Business cabin

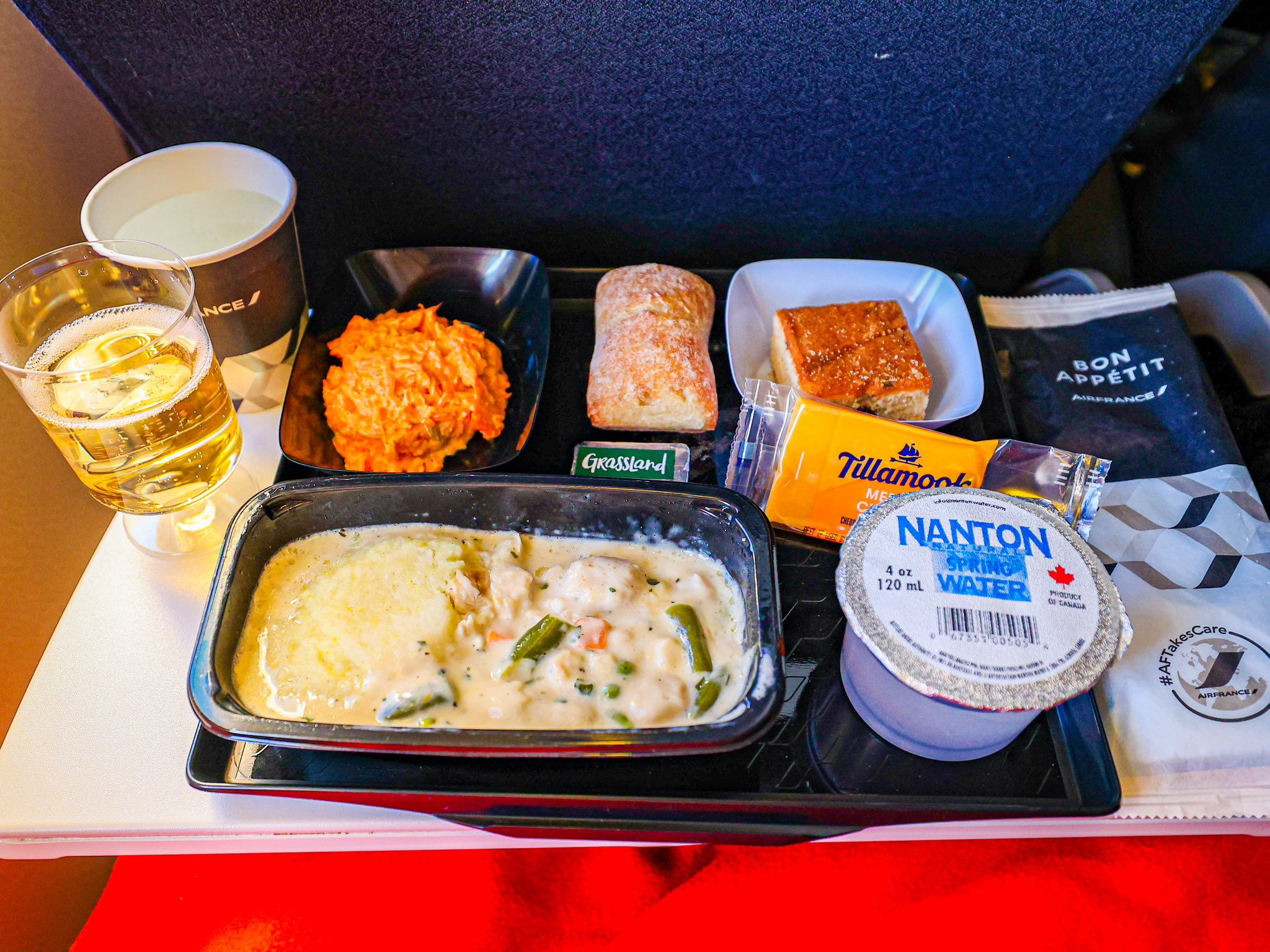
Air France economy class meal served on a trans-Atlantic flight

For La Première, Air France's first class menu is designed by Guy Martin, chef of Le Grand Vefour, a Michelin three-star restaurant in Paris. Menu items include hors d'oeuvres, entrées, bread basket, and cheeses, along with a dessert cart including pastries, petit fours, and tartlets. On long-haul flights, Air France also serves complimentary champagne and wine to passengers in all classes.

=== In-flight entertainment ===
Air France offers Audio Video on Demand (AVOD) in all cabins on all long haul aircraft. The in flight entertainment system features multiple channels of video, audio, music, and games. Air France Magazine, the airline's in-flight publication, is included at each seat, and Air France Madame, a fashion luxury magazine with a feminine perspective, is included in La Première and Business cabins and lounges. On all flights, all films may be watched in English, Spanish, and French. Selected films on all flights are also available in Chinese, Japanese, Hindi, and Korean. The airline offers Berlitz International language courses via the in-flight entertainment system.

On 29 May 2013, KLM and Air France launched a pilot to test inflight Wi-Fi. Both airlines have equipped one Boeing 777-300ER of each of their fleets with Wi-Fi. Using the inflight Wi-Fi, passengers can stay online using their Wi-Fi enabled smartphones, laptops, or tablets. Wireless service would commence once the flight has reached 20,000 feet.

=== Le Salon ===
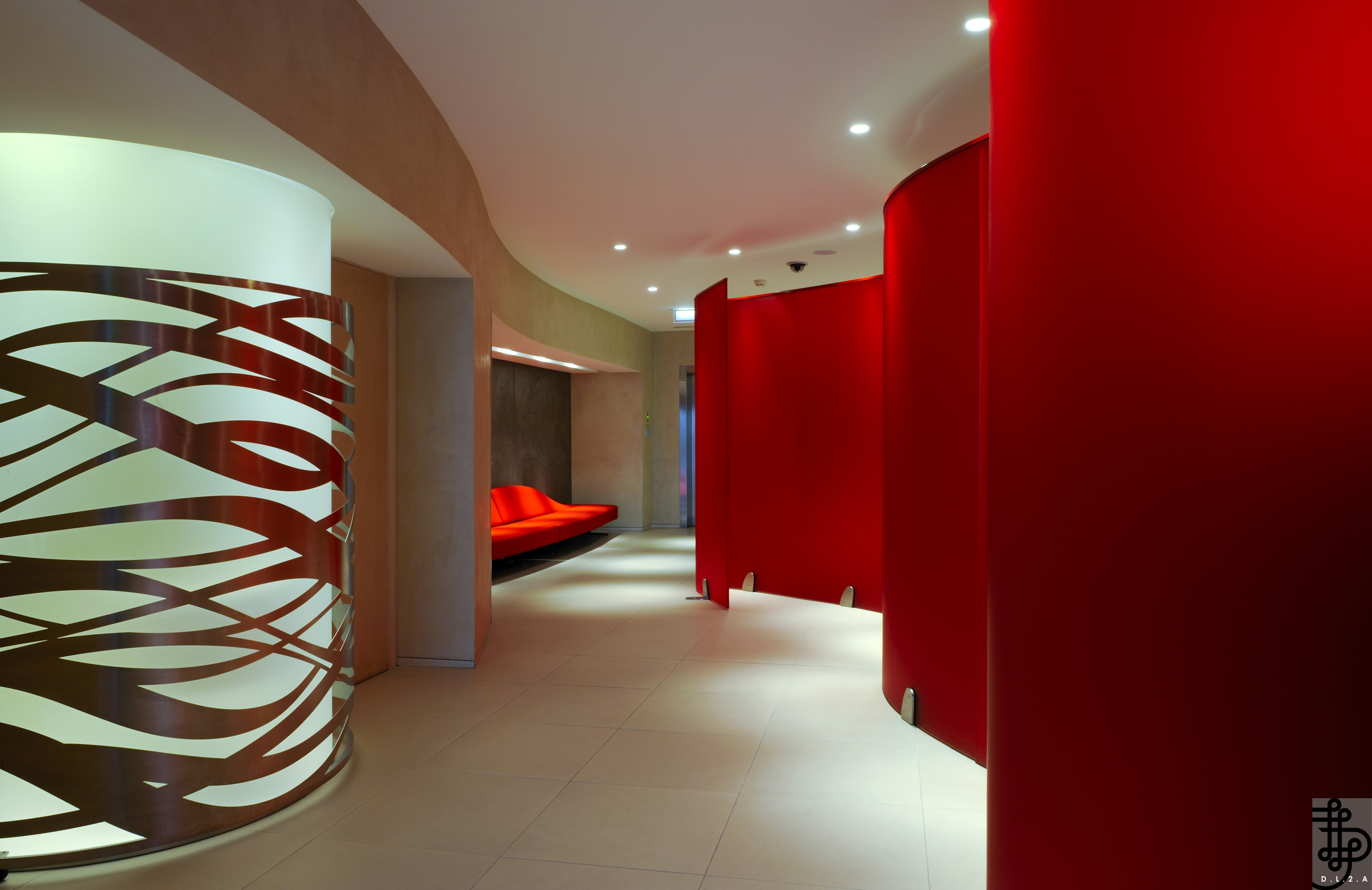
Air France's Le Salon La Première

Air France lounges are known as Le Salon, and are open to La Première and Business passengers, as well as Flying Blue Gold, Flying Blue Platinum and SkyTeam Elite Plus members. Worldwide, there are 530 Air France and SkyTeam lounges in 300 international airports on every continent except Antarctica.

=== Flying Blue ===
Flying Blue, the frequent flyer program of Air France-KLM, awards members points based on distance travelled and class of service. Membership into the program is free. The program is divided into standard (Explorer), Elite (Silver) and Elite Plus (Gold and Platinum) statuses. Explorer is the basic level which is attained upon entry into the program. Elite status is attained by accruing a certain number of XP (Experience Points) within one year. Elite Silver, Elite Plus Gold, and Elite Plus Platinum cards have added benefits. An invitation-only card called Club 2000 is attributed to some VIPs, celebrities and politicians. Officially, it provides the same benefits as Platinum status but numerous sources confirm it almost guarantees upgrade to Business or La Première. Flying Blue succeeded Air France's previous frequent flyer program, Fréquence Plus, which operated until the Air France-KLM merger in 2003.

== In popular culture ==
- Air France is the official airline of the Cannes Film Festival.
- Air France "flight 273" is the plane that "Chat Noir" in "Magic Kaito 1412" episode 18: Golden Eye (Part 2): Kid vs Chat Noir Showdown, uses to escape.

=== Anniversary jet ===
On 14 November 2008, Air France released the first picture of an Airbus A320 that had been repainted in the full 1946 paint scheme to celebrate the airline's 75th anniversary. This heritage aircraft was planned to fly under the special colours until early 2010. In 2013 the aircraft was withdrawn from use for scrapping.

== Award and recognition ==
On 24 June 2024, Air France was voted for multiple top awards by Skytrax; 2024 World's Best First Class Catering, Best Airline in Western Europe and Best First Class Lounge Dining.

In 2026, Air France improved its standing in international airline rankings. It was named by Skytrax "Best Airline in Western Europe" as well as "World's Best First Class" and "World's Best First Class Lounge dining". The airline thus moved up from 8th to 7th in the global rankings.

== Incidents and accidents ==
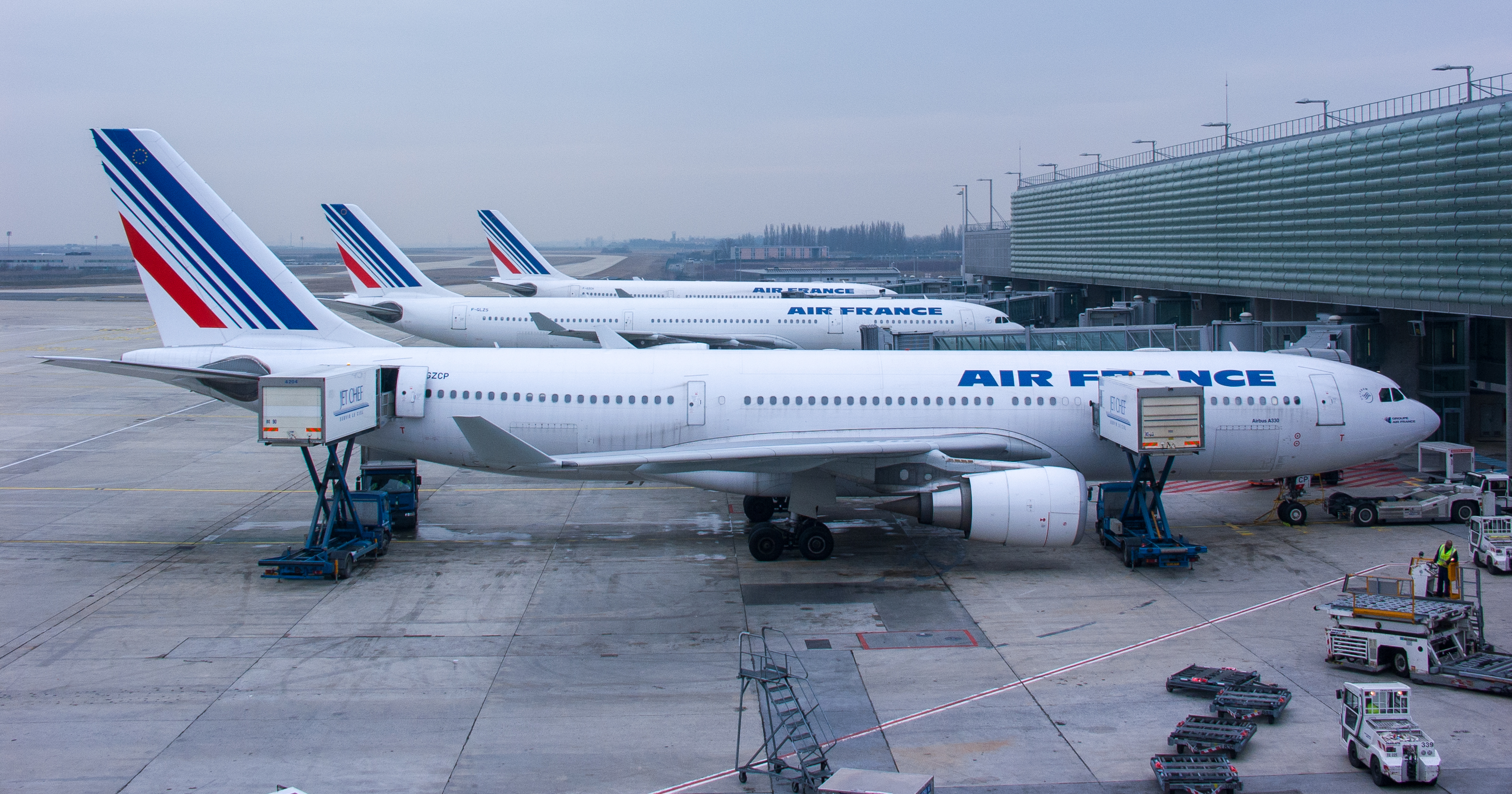
An array of Air France aircraft at Charles de Gaulle Airport in 2008. From afar: Airbus A330-203 F-GZCN, Airbus A340-313 F-GLZS, and Airbus A330-203 F-GZCP, the latter of which crashed into the Atlantic Ocean while flying flight 447.

Air France has been involved in a number of major accidents and incidents. The airline's deadliest accident occurred on 1 June 2009, when Air France Flight 447, an Airbus A330-203, crashed into the Atlantic Ocean killing all 228 on board. Another notable crash in Air France's records occurred on 25 July 2000, when Air France Flight 4590, a Concorde, caught fire immediately after take-off due to metal debris on the runway damaging a tire, which produced debris that struck a fuel tank on the underside of the wing, catching fire. The fire started to disintegrate the aircraft's left wing and the plane started to tilt to its side. This caused the aircraft to crash into a hotel on the outskirts of Gonesse, France. All 109 passengers and crew inside Flight 4590, as well as four people inside the hotel, were killed.

== See also ==
- Dirigisme
- List of airlines by foundation date
- List of airlines of France
- List of airports in France
- List of companies of France
- Transport in France
- Air transport in France

== Bibliography ==
- Laile, H. (1963). Les transports aériens-Air France (in French). Hachette-EPI.
- Reichman, C.; Metzle, D. (1972). L'enjeu aérien-Air France (in French). Paris: France-Empire.
- Lasserre, J. (2000). Un siecle d'aviation avec Air France (in French). Musée Air France and Gallimard.
- Jones, G. (2008). Air France. Hersham: Midland Publishing.
