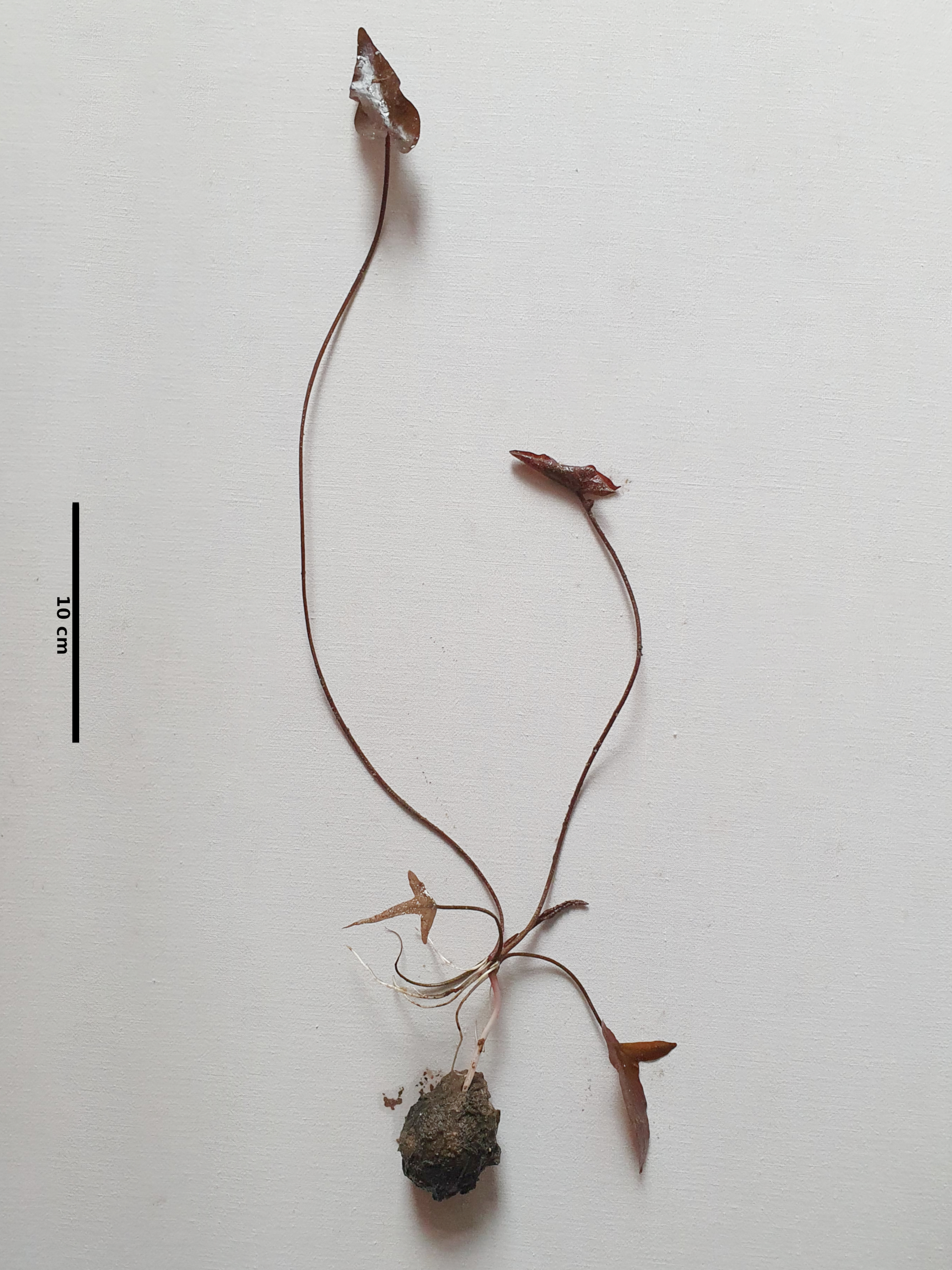

Scientific classification
- Kingdom: Plantae
- Clade: Tracheophytes
- Clade: Angiosperms
- Order: Nymphaeales
- Family: Nymphaeaceae
- Genus: Nymphaea
- Subgenus: Nymphaea subg. Lotos
- Species: N. × rosea

Binomial name
- Nymphaea × rosea (Sims) Sweet

Synonyms
- Nymphaea × omarana var. rosea (Sims) R.Ansari & Jeeja; Nymphaea rubra var. rosea Sims; Nymphaea × omarana Bisset; Nymphaea × trickeri J.N.Gerard

= Nymphaea × rosea =

Species of aquatic plant

Nymphaea × rosea is a complex waterlily hybrid of unclear identity and taxonomic status. It is said to be an artificial hybrid of Nymphaea lotus, Nymphaea pubescens, and Nymphaea rubra occurring in Thailand, India, Sri Lanka, Myanmar, Malaysia, and Indonesia.

== Description ==
=== Vegetative characteristics ===
Nymphaea × rosea is a perennial, aquatic, rhizomatous herb with large, bronze red to bronze green, petiolate, 35 cm long, and 32 cm wide leaves. The petiole is pubescent.

=== Generative characteristics ===
The pink to rose, nocturnal, fragrant or inodorous flowers are up to 18 cm wide. The androecium consists of 50–80 stamens. The gynoecium consists of 16–20 carpels. The ellipsoid seeds bear pink longitudinal ridges.

== Taxonomy ==
It was first published as Nymphaea rubra var. rosea Sims by John Sims in 1811. It was treated as a separate hybrid Nymphaea × rosea (Sims) Sweet by Robert Sweet in 1826. It is an artificial hybrid of Nymphaea lotus, Nymphaea pubescens, and Nymphaea rubra. Sometimes, only Sweet is credited as the taxon author. Some sources treat it as a synonym of Nymphaea rubra Roxb. ex Andrews, or of Nymphaea pubescens Willd. It is placed in the subgenus Nymphaea subg. Lotos.

=== Etymology ===
The hybrid name rosea means rose-coloured or rose-like.

== Distribution ==
It occurs in Thailand, India, Sri Lanka, Myanmar, Malaysia, and Indonesia.

== Use ==
It is used in water gardens.
