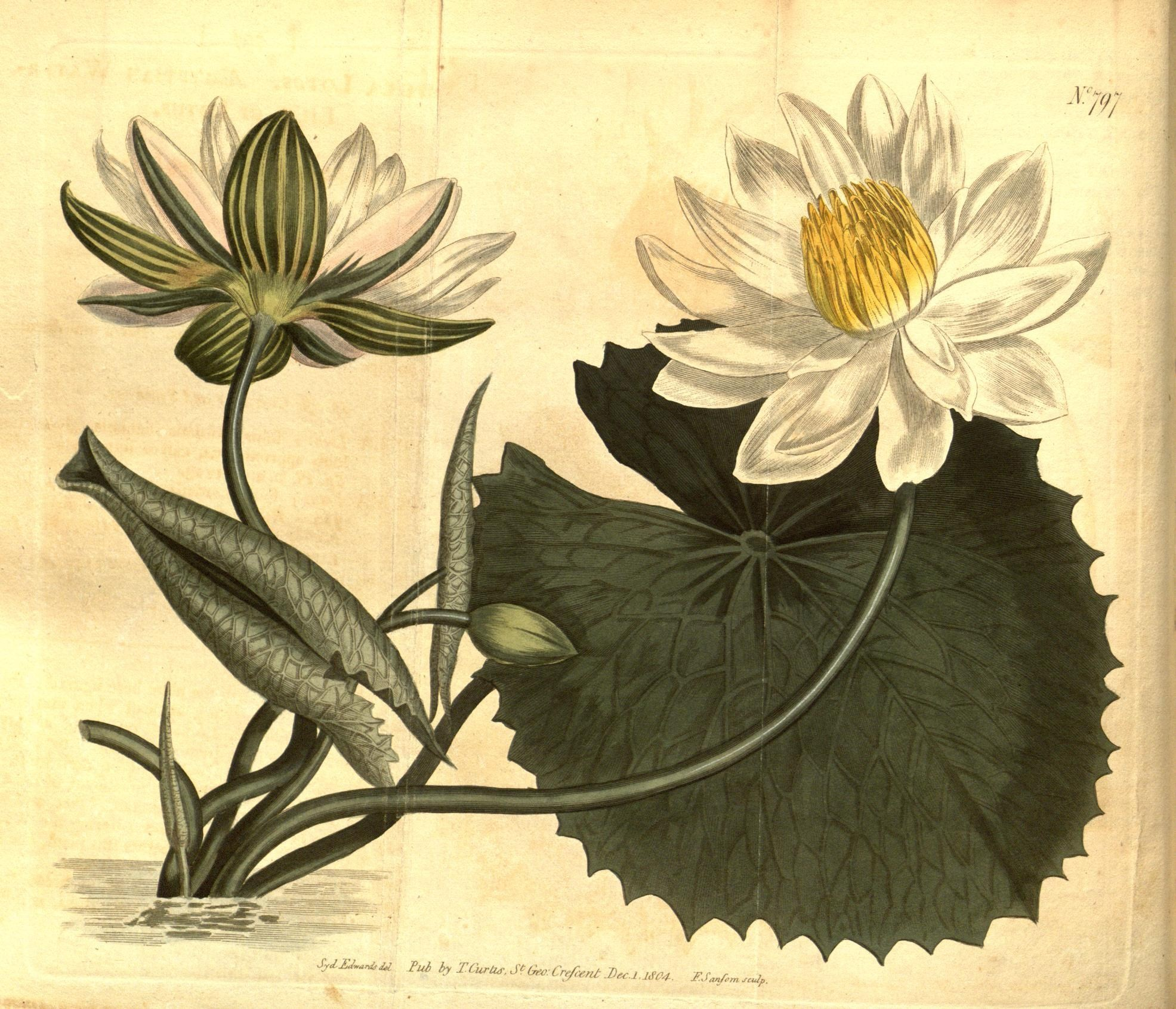
- Botanical illustration of Nymphaea lotus

Scientific classification
- Kingdom: Plantae
- Clade: Tracheophytes
- Clade: Angiosperms
- Order: Nymphaeales
- Family: Nymphaeaceae
- Genus: Nymphaea
- Subgenus: Nymphaea subg. Lotos

Type species
- Nymphaea lotus L.

Species
- See here

= Nymphaea subg. Lotos =

Subgenus of flowering plants

Nymphaea subg. Lotos is a subgenus of the genus Nymphaea.

== Description ==
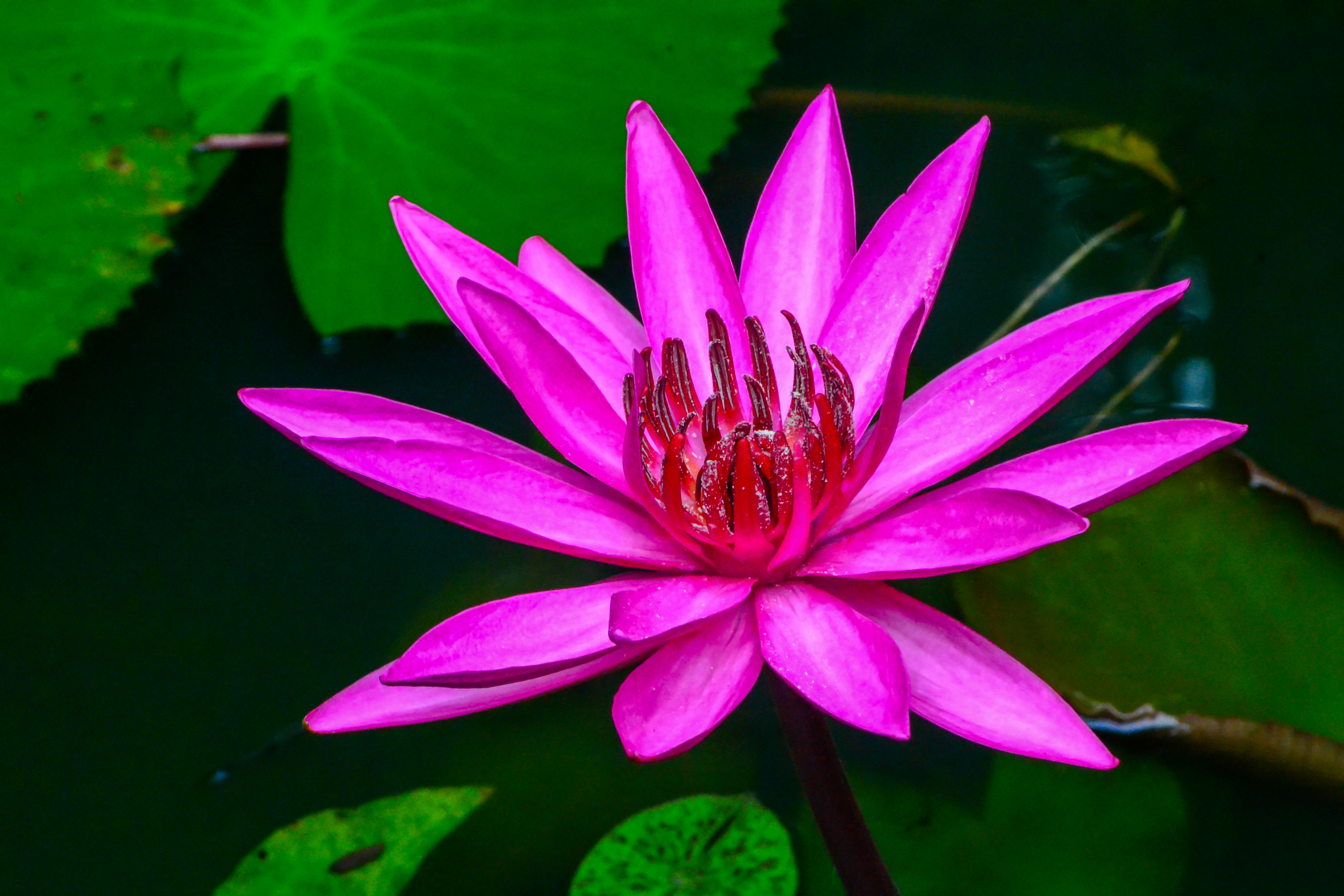
Stamens of Nymphaea rubra without sterile apical appendage
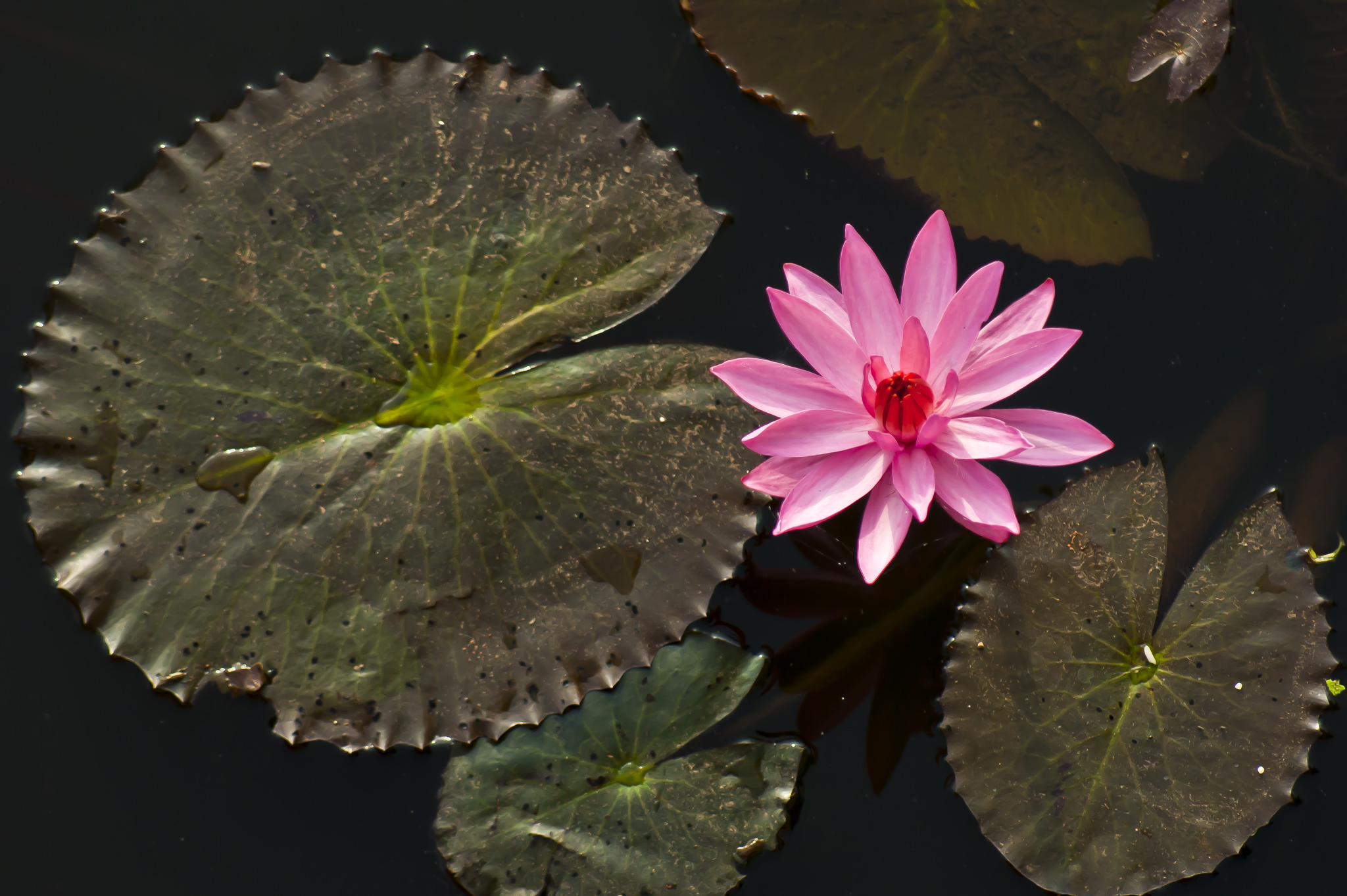
Leaf of Nymphaea rubra with dentate margin

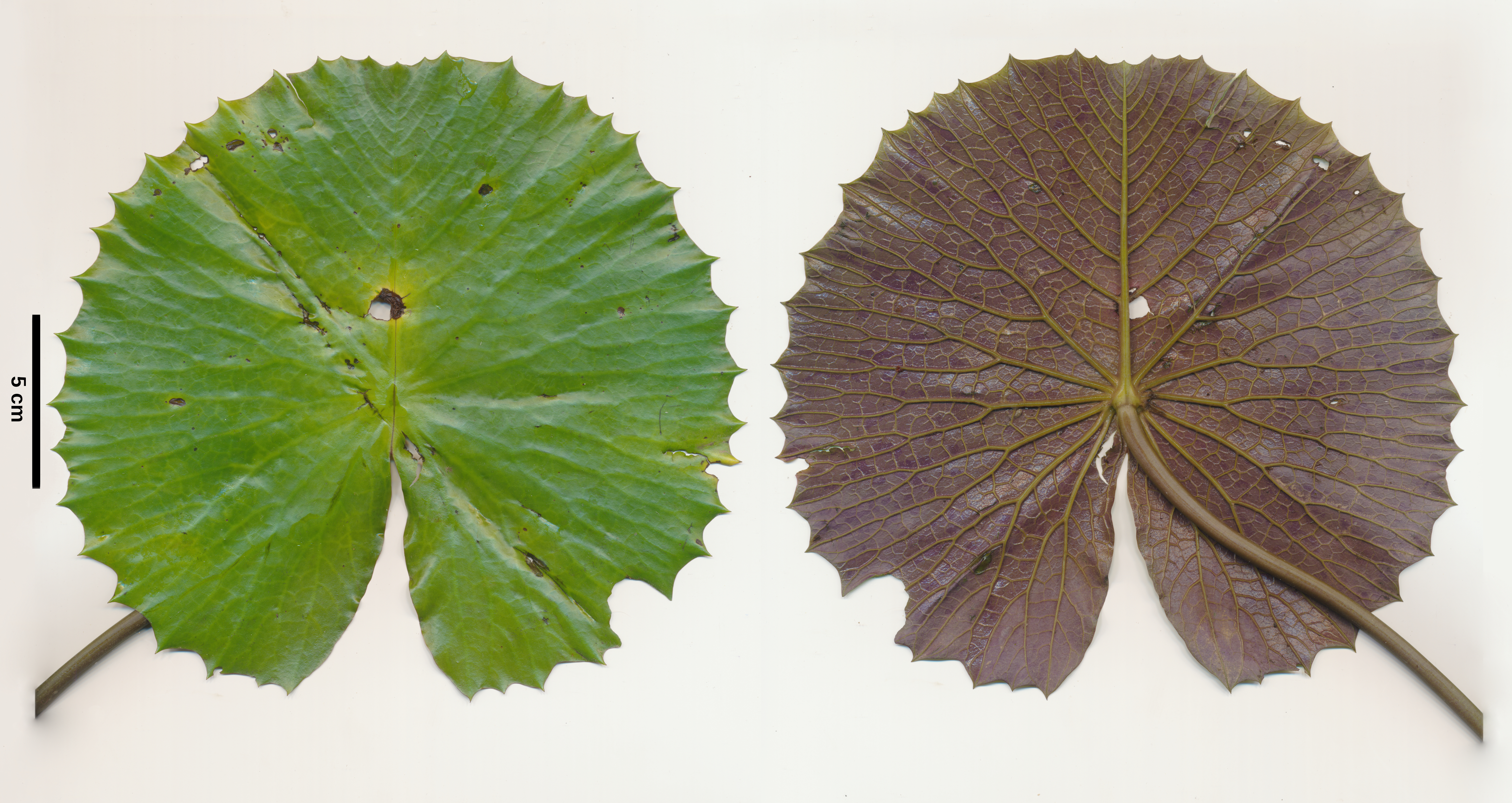
Floating leaf of Nymphaea lotus

=== Vegetative characteristics ===
The rhizomes are short, vertical, and tuberous. The pubescent leaves have a dentate crenate, or serrate margin.

=== Generative characteristics ===
The blue, white, cream, yellow, magenta, or pink, nocturnal or diurnal, emergent flowers extend up to 20 cm above the water surface. The stamens do not have sterile appendages at the apex.

=== Cytology ===
In Nymphaea pubescens and Nymphaea lotus, the chromosome count is 2n = 56. They are tetraploid species.

== Taxonomy ==
=== Publication ===
It was published as Nymphaea sect. Lotos DC. by Augustin Pyramus de Candolle in 1821. Later, it was elevated to the subgenus Nymphaea subgen. Lotos (DC.) Conard published by Henry Shoemaker Conard in 1905.

=== Type species ===
The type species is Nymphaea lotus L.

=== Species ===
- †Nymphaea brongniartii (Caspary) Saporta
- †Nymphaea elisabethae Gee & David W. Taylor
- †Nymphaea haeringiana (Unger) Friedrich
- Nymphaea lotus L.
- Nymphaea lotus var. thermalis (DC.) Tuzson
- Nymphaea petersiana Klotzsch
- Nymphaea pubescens Willd.
- Nymphaea × rosea (Sims) Sweet
- Nymphaea rubra Roxb. ex Andrews

== Fossil record ==
Fossils from the upper Oligocene (28.4–23.0 million years ago) of France have been assigned to Nymphaea subg. Lotos. It is also known from the Rupelian (33.9 – 27.82 Ma) of Bad Häring, Austria.

== Distribution ==
It is native to the paleotropis.

== Ecology ==
=== Pollination ===
Pollination by the scarab beetle Ruteloryctes morio (tribe Cyclocephalini) has been reported in Nymphaea subg. Lotos.
