= Nymphaea haeringiana =

Nymphaea haeringiana Temporal range: Rupelian

Scientific classification
- Kingdom: Plantae
- Clade: Tracheophytes
- Clade: Angiosperms
- Order: Nymphaeales
- Family: Nymphaeaceae
- Genus: Nymphaea
- Subgenus: Nymphaea subg. Lotos
- Species: †N. haeringiana

Binomial name
- †Nymphaea haeringiana (Unger) Butzm., T.C. Fisch., E. Rieber

Fossil species of aquatic plant

Nymphaea haeringiana is a fossil species in the family Nymphaeaceae from the Rupelian of Bad Häring, Austria.

== Description ==
The fossil bears 224 scars of stamens. The gynoecium consists of 32 fused carpels. The stigmatic disk is 65 mm wide.

== Taxonomy ==
It was first published as Palaeolobium haeringianum Unger by Franz Unger in 1850. It was placed in the genus Nymphaea L. as Nymphaea haeringiana (Unger) Butzm., T.C. Fisch., E. Rieber by Rainer Butzmann, Thilo C. Fischer, and Ernst Rieber in 2009, although (Unger) Friedrich was proposed as the species authority. It is placed in the subgenus Nymphaea subg. Lotos.
