= Fang Fenglei =

Chinese investment banker

- 方风雷
- Education: Sun Yat-sen University (BA)
- Known for: Co-founder of Hopu Investment Management
- Children: Anna Fang (daughter)

Fang Fenglei (Chinese: 方风雷) is a Chinese investment banker who co-founded private equity firm Hopu Investment Management. He previously served as chairman of Goldman Sachs Gaohua Securities, deputy chief executive of China International Capital Corporation and CEO of BOC International Holdings.

== Biography ==
Fang is the son of a former peasant farmer who rose to a senior administrative post in the People's Liberation Army. During the Cultural Revolution, he was sent to the Inner Mongolian countryside. He then joined the army before entering Sun Yat-sen University in Guangzhou.

After graduation, he was assigned a job in Henan Province's Economy and Trade Bureau, where he became close friends with Wang Qishan. Fang convinced Wang to establish China International Capital Corporation, a joint venture with Morgan Stanley, in 1995. He then held the chief executive position at the Hong Kong investment banking branch of the Bank of China and the Industrial and Commercial Bank of China. In 2005, he brokered a deal that would allow the entry of Goldman Sachs into China by establishing a securities joint venture with Fang as chairman. In 2007, he set up Hopu Investment Management with Dominic Ho, former head of KPMG China, and former Goldman Sachs banker Richard Ong, and with help from Singapore's sovereign fund Temasek Holdings.

For his role in transactions such as China National Offshore Oil Corporation's acquisition of Unocal Corporation, and the initial public listings of China Mobile, China Telecom, China Unicom, China Netcom, PetroChina and Sinopec, he has been described by some sources as one of China's most prominent investment bankers.

== Personal life and family ==
Fang's daughter, Anna Fang-Hamm, is a venture capitalist and the CEO of ZhenFund. She is ranked 21st on Forbes' Midas List. Fang is also the son-in-law of Chinese economist and former Chinese Academy of Social Sciences deputy director Liu Guoguang (刘国光).
