= Summer Palace Dialogue =

The Summer Palace Dialogue (SPD) is an economic forum which brings together economists from both China and the United States to discuss economic cooperation between the two largest economies in the world. SPD is co-hosted by Chinese Economists 50 Forum and the Columbia Global Centers East Asia, and was formerly co-hosted by the Brookings Institution. It was founded in 2009 by former Vice Chairman of the Joint Chiefs of Staff and current Chairman of AEA Investors Admiral Bill Owens and Vice Minister Liu He of the Chinese Central Leading Group on Financial and Economic Affairs. The forum extends for two days. Participants spend the first day in private discussions and then convene a half-day public session to summarize their observations, analyses, and conclusions with the press and a broader audience. The Summer Palace Dialogue is scheduled annually in mid-September in Beijing, right before the Summer World Economic Forum in Dalian. The third annual Summer Palace Dialogue was held on September 12–13, 2011.

Other than the forum, SPD sends a delegation of Chinese economists who participated in the forum to major cities in both the east and west coasts of the United States in order to conduct first hand research on political, social and economic conditions in the U.S.

== Topics of discussion ==
=== 2009 ===
In 2009 the economists at the Summer Palace Dialogue discussed possible economic incentives which could slow down and stop climate change, especially in regards to the actions and policies of the United States and China.

=== 2010 ===
In 2010 Lou Jiwei, the chairman of the China Investment Corporation and an economist at the Summer Palace Dialogue, said that China should sell its U.S. dollars and diversify its foreign currency holdings if the United States continues its loose monetary policy. Lou Jiwei also had some advice for the United States, in which he said that the US Federal Reserve should tighten monetary policy and the United States Congress should continue with raising stimulus spending. Also in 2010, the economists at the Summer Palace Dialogue supported a deal between China's Ansteel Group and Mississippi-based Steel Development Co. which establishes a joint venture in the United States.

=== 2011 ===
The 2011 Summer Palace Dialogue focused on rebalancing the global economy in light of a stubbornly persistent economic downturn. Participants stressed that the United States is going through a painful but necessary process of decreasing household debt. This restructuring is severely undermining demand in the U.S. economy, thus harming economic output and employment. Part of global rebalancing, participants said, was pushing the United States to greater export dependence, in line with President Obama's 2010 initiative to double U.S. net exports in five years.

SPD economists and policymakers also assessed China's current economic challenges: inflation, local debt, and the possibility of a housing crisis. Beijing's primary rebalancing task remains to increase Chinese domestic consumption. Such a shift will provide a new boom in Chinese economic growth while also decreasing China's trade surplus. Increasing Chinese outward foreign direct investment to the United States and small business purchases of U.S. goods were also solutions to help resolve the U.S.-China trade imbalance.

== Participants ==
=== American economists ===
- Admiral William A. Owens: Chairman, AEA Investors Asia; Former Vice Chairman of Joint Chiefs of Staff.
- Kenneth W. Dam: Professor, School of Law, University of Chicago; Former Deputy Secretary of the Treasury; Former Deputy Secretary of State.
- Laura D’Andrea Tyson: S.K. and Angela Chan Professor of Global Management at the Haas School of Business, University of California Berkeley; Member of President Obama’s Economic Recovery Advisory Board.
- Thomas R. Pickering: Vice Chairman, Hills and Company; Former Under-Secretary of State for Political Affairs.
- David Dollar: US Treasury’s Economic and Financial Emissary to China; Former Country Director for China and Mongolia, World Bank.
- Merit E. Janow: Professor of International Trade/WTO Law, Director of International Finance and Economic Policy Program, and Co-Director of the APEC Study Center, School of International and Public Affairs, Columbia University; Former Member, Appellate Body from North America, World Trade Organization (WTO).
- Wing Thye Woo: Professor of Economics, University of California at Davis; Yangtze River Scholar, the Central University of Finance and Economics; Non-Resident Senior Fellow, Brookings Institution.
- Barry Bosworth: Senior Fellow, Economic Studies Program, Brookings Institution; Former Presidential Advisor.
- Daniel B. Wright: President and CEO, GreenPoint Group, LLC; Former U.S. Treasury Department’s Managing Director for China and the Strategic Economic Dialogue.
- David Crane: Special Advisor to the Governor for Jobs and Economic Growth, Schwarzenegger Administration.
- Geng Xiao: Director, Columbia Global Centers, Columbia University; Former founding Director of the Brookings-Tsinghua Center for Public Policy and former Senior Fellow of the Brookings Institution.

=== Chinese economists ===
- Liu He: Party Secretary, Development Research Center of the State Council; Deputy Head, Office of the Central Leading Group on Financial and Economic Affairs.
- Lou Jiwei: Chairman of the China Investment Corporation.
- Wu Xiaoling: Member of The National People’s Congress Standing Committee; Deputy Chairman of Financial and Economic Committee, National People's Congress; Former Deputy Governor, People's Bank of China.
- Long Yongtu: Former Secretary General of Boao Forum for Asia and former Chief Negotiator for China’s accession to WTO.
- Cai Fang: Member of The National People’s Congress Standing Committee; President of Institute of Population and Labor Economics, Chinese Academy of Social Sciences (CASS); Director of Human Resources Research Center, CASS
- Fan Gang: Vice President of China Society of Economic Reform; President of National Economic Research Institute.
- Tang Min: Assistant Secretary General of China Development Research Foundation.
- Yu Yongding: Former President of Institute of World Economy and Politics, Chinese Academy of Social Sciences (CASS).
- Zhang Weiying: Assistant President of Peking University; former Dean of Guanghua School of Management of Peking University.
- Bai Chong-en: Vice Dean of School of Economics and Management (SEM) Tsinghua University; Chairman of Department of Finance, Tsinghua University.
