= Anna Fang =

Chinese investor

- Other name: Fang Aizhi
- Education: Columbia University (BA); Stanford University (MBA)
- Title: CEO, ZhenFund
- Father: Fang Fenglei

Anna Fang (Chinese: 方爱之; pinyin: Fāng Àizhī) is a Chinese venture capitalist. She is the CEO and a founding partner of ZhenFund.

== Biography ==
Fang graduated from Westtown School in 2000, then received her BA from Columbia University in 2004 and received her MBA from Stanford Graduate School of Business in 2010. She started her career as an investment banker at JPMorgan after graduating from Columbia before working for a Chinese cultural organization in the United Kingdom. After graduating from Stanford, she started at General Electric China in business development before being approached by her Stanford classmate to help Chinese investor Xu Xiaoping launch a new venture capital fund, now known as ZhenFund.

Fang has funded more than 30 seed-stage startups that have gone on to be unicorns, including the internet platform Xiaohongshu, Horizon Robotics, Huobi, VIPKid, and Nuro.

In April 2022, she was named #1 on Forbes magazine's debut Midas Seed List for "building the world's best seed-stage startup portfolio" and was named #12 on the Midas List, being the highest ranked woman on the list. She appeared on the 2023 Midas List of seed investors (at #2) and top tech investors (at #28), and then again on the 2024 Midas Seed List (#4) and 2024 Midas List: Top Tech Investors (#63).

Fang sits on the board of Columbia Global Centers, East Asia. She is a recipient of Columbia College's John Jay Award in 2022.

== Personal life and family ==
Fang is the daughter of Chinese investment banker Fang Fenglei, who helped found Hopu Investment Management and China International Capital Corporation and served as the Chairman of Goldman Sachs's China division. She married Gunther Hamm in Beijing in 2010. He serves as Co-president of Hopu Investment Management.
