= Westtown School =

Private school in West Chester, Pennsylvania, United States

Coordinates: 39.9494°N 75.5379°W

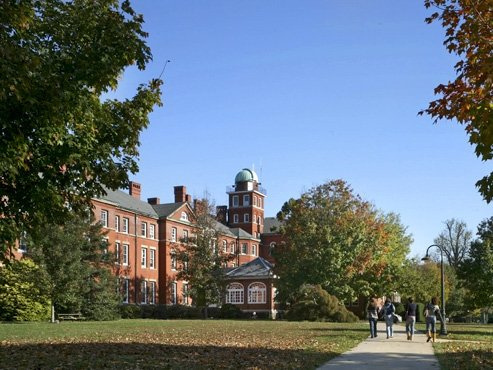

Location
- 975 Westtown Rd; West Chester, Pennsylvania 19382; United States

Information
- Type: Private; College preparatory; day; boarding school
- Religious affiliation: Quaker
- Established: May 6, 1799; 227 years ago
- Head of school: Chris Benbow
- Faculty: 104
- Grades: K–12
- Gender: Co-educational
- Enrollment: 687
- Average class size: 10 students
- Campus size: 600 acres
- Campus type: Suburban
- Colors: Brown, white & Columbia blue
- Athletics: 24 Varsity Teams
- Athletics conference: Friends School League; Pennsylvania Independent School Athletic Association (PAISAA)
- Mascot: Westtown Moose
- Nickname: Moose
- Rival: George School
- Publication: Westonian
- Newspaper: Brown and White(Digital)
- Yearbook: Amicus
- Tuition: $28,100–$79,500
- Website: www.westtown.edu

Westtown School is a Quaker, coeducational, college preparatory day and boarding school located in West Chester, Pennsylvania, outside of Philadelphia. Founded in 1799 by the Religious Society of Friends, Westtown enrolls 687 students in pre-kindergarten through twelfth grade.

Westtown is a Quaker school affiliated with the Friends General Conference branch of the Religious Society of Friends. The school requires all students to attend Meeting for Worship together with adults in the community who voluntarily attend. Westtown uses the traditional Quaker practice of coming to unity in making some high-level decisions.

Westtown has been coeducational since its founding in 1799. Westtown students come from 16 states and 13 countries.

== History ==
Westtown School opened on May 6, 1799. Philadelphia Quakers founded the school after raising money to build a boarding school and purchasing land a full day's carriage ride from Philadelphia—where they could provide a "guarded education in a healthy environment" away from the secular influences of the city. For many years, Westtown was nearly self-sufficient, with the campus providing raw materials used in the construction of its buildings and food for the people who lived and worked at the school. Westtown is the oldest continuously operating coeducational boarding school in the United States.

Boys and girls had separate classes until about 1870. Boys learned useful skills such as woodshop, surveying, and bookkeeping, and girls had classes like sewing. However, Westtown eventually recognized that students of both genders should know basic academic subjects such as reading, penmanship, grammar, mathematics, geography, and science.

The 1880s brought physical changes to Westtown. The main building was replaced with a structure designed by architect Addison Hutton, completed in 1888, and still in use today. During the 20th century, the student body and curriculum became more diverse. For example, the school added visual and performing arts, and eventually admitted non-Quaker, African-American, and international students.

Westtown's Esther Duke Archives is a facility dedicated to collecting and maintaining materials relating to the people and history of the school.

== Student Life ==
Westtown School has a variety of clubs and organizations run by both faculty and students, including SASH (Students Advocating for Student Health), JSU (Jewish Student Union), BSU (Black Student Union), ISO (International Student Organization), Green Coalition, Politics Club, Hearts for Hearts (H4H), and Rainbow Alliance. Other popular clubs include flag football, chess, ski, Dungeons and Dragons, E-Sports, and Model UN.

Students also partake in weekend trips to nearby places like Philadelphia, King of Prussia Mall, and West Chester.

== Sports ==
The 2018 documentary, We Town, is about the 2016-2017 Upper School basketball team, featuring Mo Bamba and Cam Reddish. It chronicles the quest of the team to win the State Championship.

The Westtown wrestling team, led by coaches Jay Farrow '75 and Timothy Loose, has amassed 26 League Titles. The wrestling team has the most FSL titles of any sport or team in the league's history. Jay Farrow coached the wrestling team for 44 years. Jay amassed 498 dual meet victories as a coach while also coaching 162 PAISWT Placewinners, including multiple National Prep All-Americans. He won PAISWT Head Coach of the Year and National Preps Head Coach of the Year in 2024, his final season of coaching.

In 2023, the Westtown boys varsity soccer team won the FSL without conceding a single goal. Additionally, girls' varsity won every game they played, and both boys and girls JV won their leagues respectively, making it the most successful year for a Friends League school's soccer program in the history of the competition.

== Campus ==
Westtown is located on a 600 acre campus in southeastern Pennsylvania. The campus includes a 14.5-acre lake, arboretum, frog pond, 14 playing fields, stadium, tennis courts, organic farm, Lower School mini-farm, medicine wheel garden, wooded cross-country course, and 21-element ropes course.

Additionally, the campus has several dozen acres of farmland and hosts "Farmer Jawn's", a local produce store. Students can participate in farming as a co-curricular activity. "Farmer Jawn's" also supports several food cupboards in the Philadelphia area.

== Notable alumni ==
- Samuel Leeds Allen, inventor of Planter Jr seeders, farm tools, and agricultural implements, as well as the Flexible Flyer, the world's first steerable runner sled
- Donald Baechler, Class of 1973, painter and sculptor
- Mo Bamba, Class of 2017, professional basketball player for Utah Jazz
- Anna Cox Brinton, classics scholar, Quaker worker overseas, administrator at Pendle Hill
- John Cassin, ornithologist
- Marysol Castro, news anchor for WPIX and Public address announcer for the New York Mets
- Laetitia Moon Conard, college instructor and politician in Iowa
- Gilbert Cope, genealogist and historian of Chester County, Pennsylvania
- Steve Curwood, Class of 1965, is host of NPR's Living on Earth environmental news series
- Susan Eisenhower, Class of 1970, consultant, author, and expert on international security
- Anna Fang, Class of 2000, Chinese venture capitalist, CEO of ZhenFund
- Jim Fowler, Class of 1947, conservationist and wildlife correspondent/show host - Mutual of Omaha's Wild Kingdom
- Benjamin Hallowell, president of Maryland Agricultural College
- Isaac Israel Hayes, Arctic explorer, physician, and politician
- Arthur W. Hummel, Jr., Class of 1938, American diplomat; U.S. ambassador to China, 1981–1985
- Crete Hutchinson, writer
- Richard T. James, with his wife, invented the Slinky
- H. Mather Lippincott Jr., architect
- Dereck Lively II, Class of 2022, professional basketball player for Dallas Mavericks
- Rachel Lloyd, chemist
- Rebecca Lukens, first woman industrialist in the United States.
- Samuel George Morton, physician, natural scientist, and writer
- Herb Pennock, Class of 1915, Major League Baseball player and manager, baseball Hall of Fame
- Walter Ferris Price, architect
- Cam Reddish, Class of 2018, basketball player for the BC Šiauliai
- Kevin Roose, Class of 2005, writer and technology columnist for the New York Times
- Holland Taylor, Class of 1960, Emmy Award-winning actress
- Garrick Utley, Class of 1957, a correspondent for CNN's New York bureau
- Anthony H. Williams, Class of 1975, Pennsylvania State Senator, 8th District

== Photo gallery ==
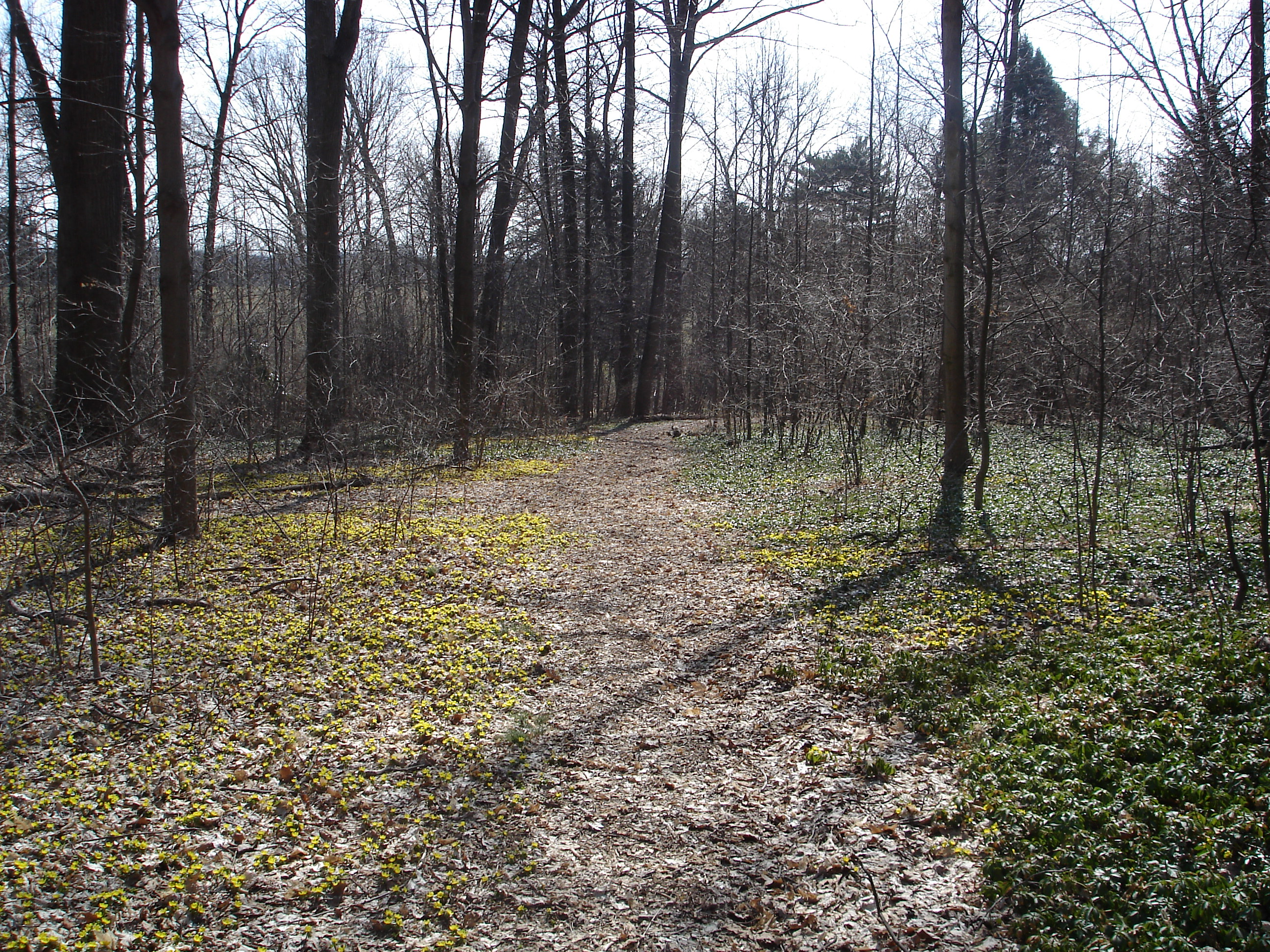
The Westtown campus is surrounded by several acres of woods.

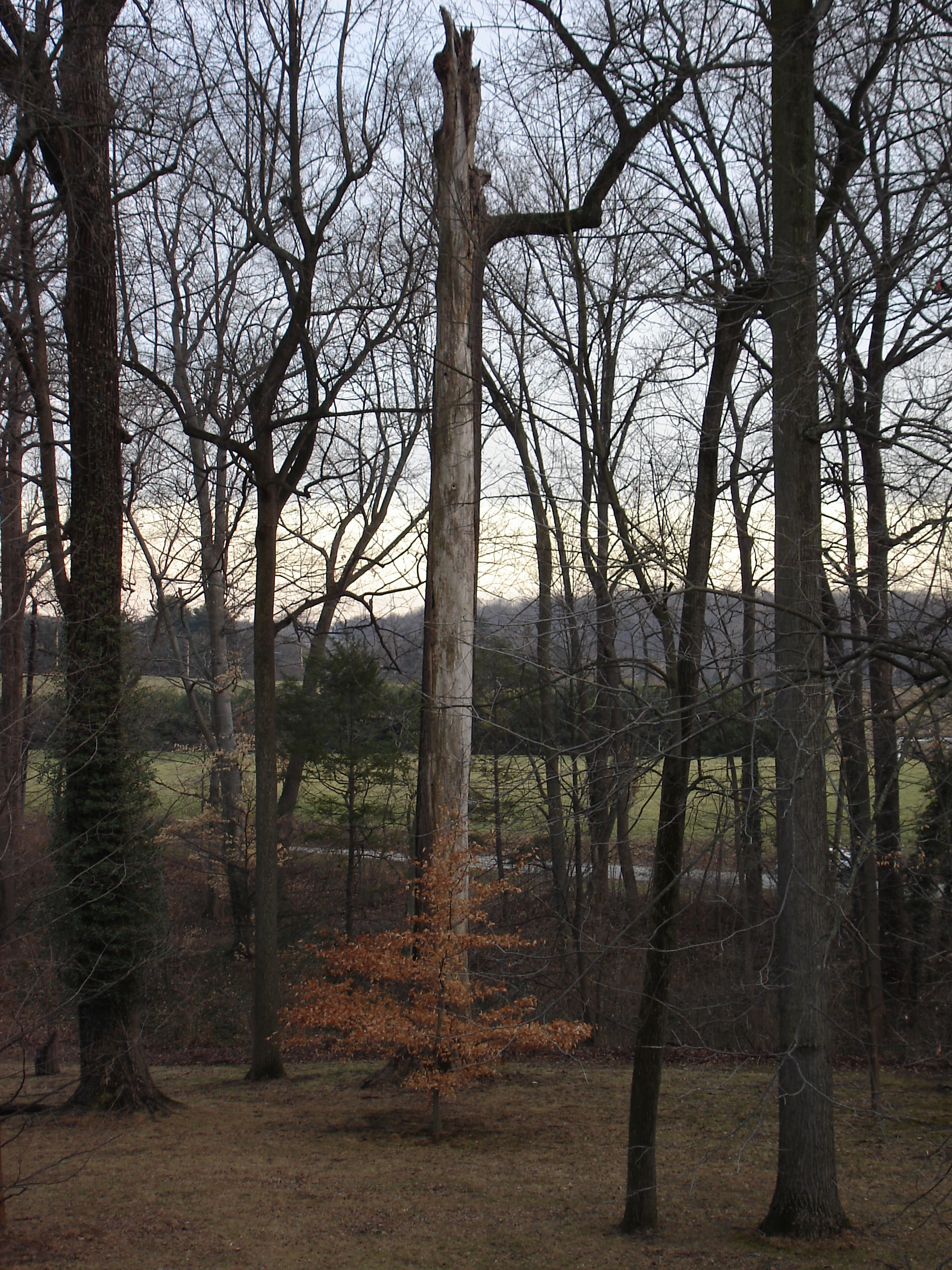
Campus trees

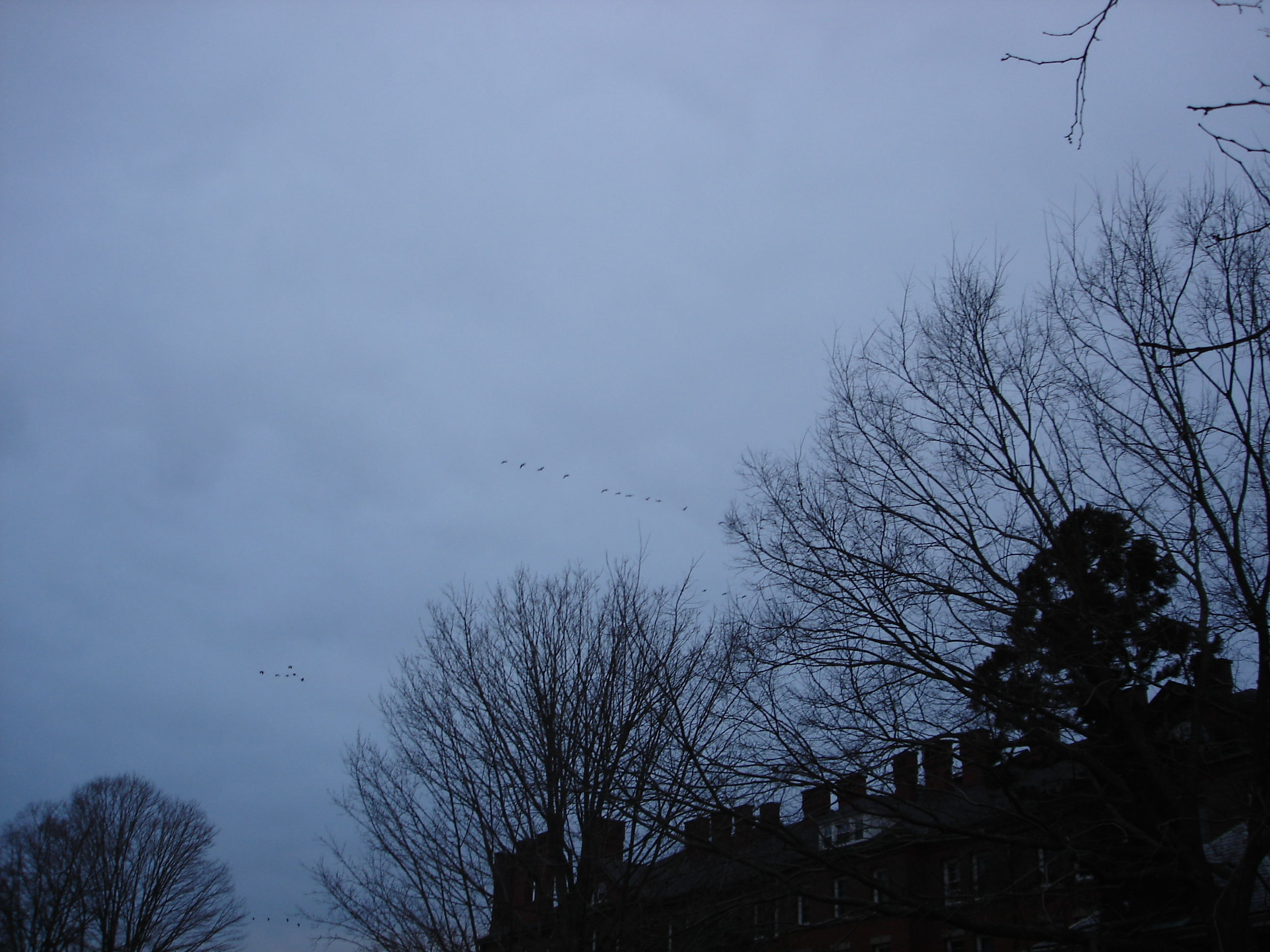
Geese flying over Main Hall

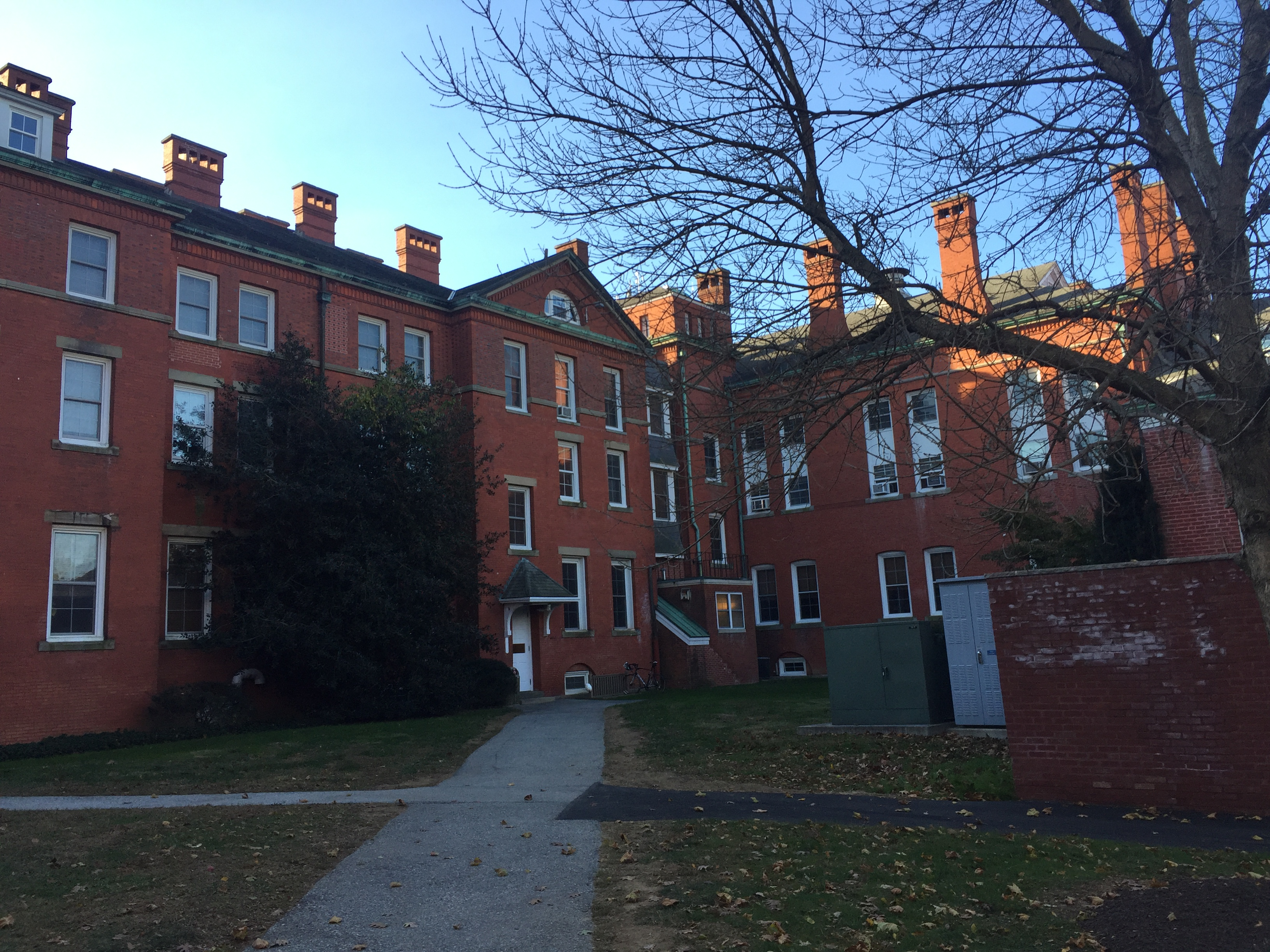
Main building

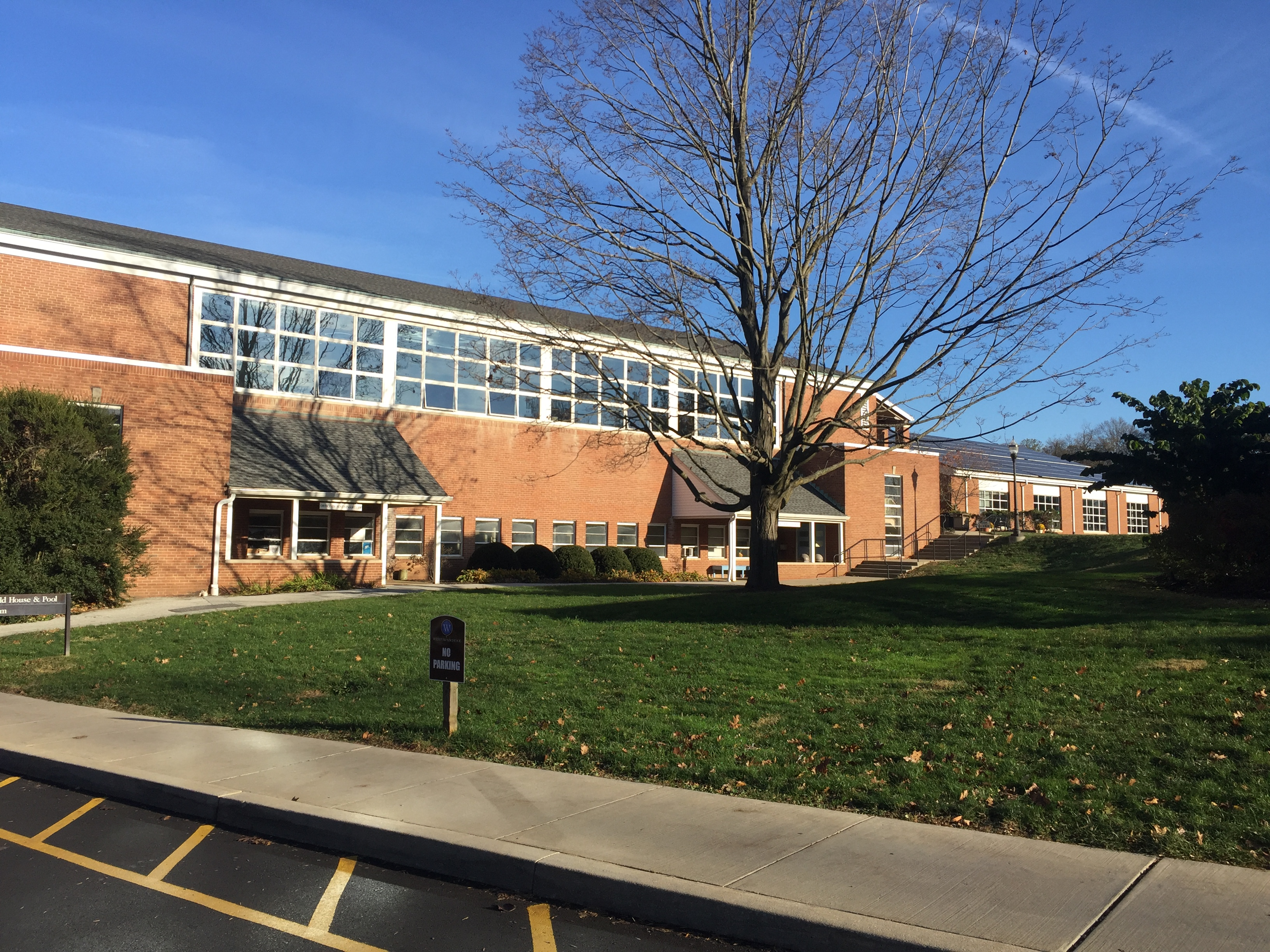
Athletics building

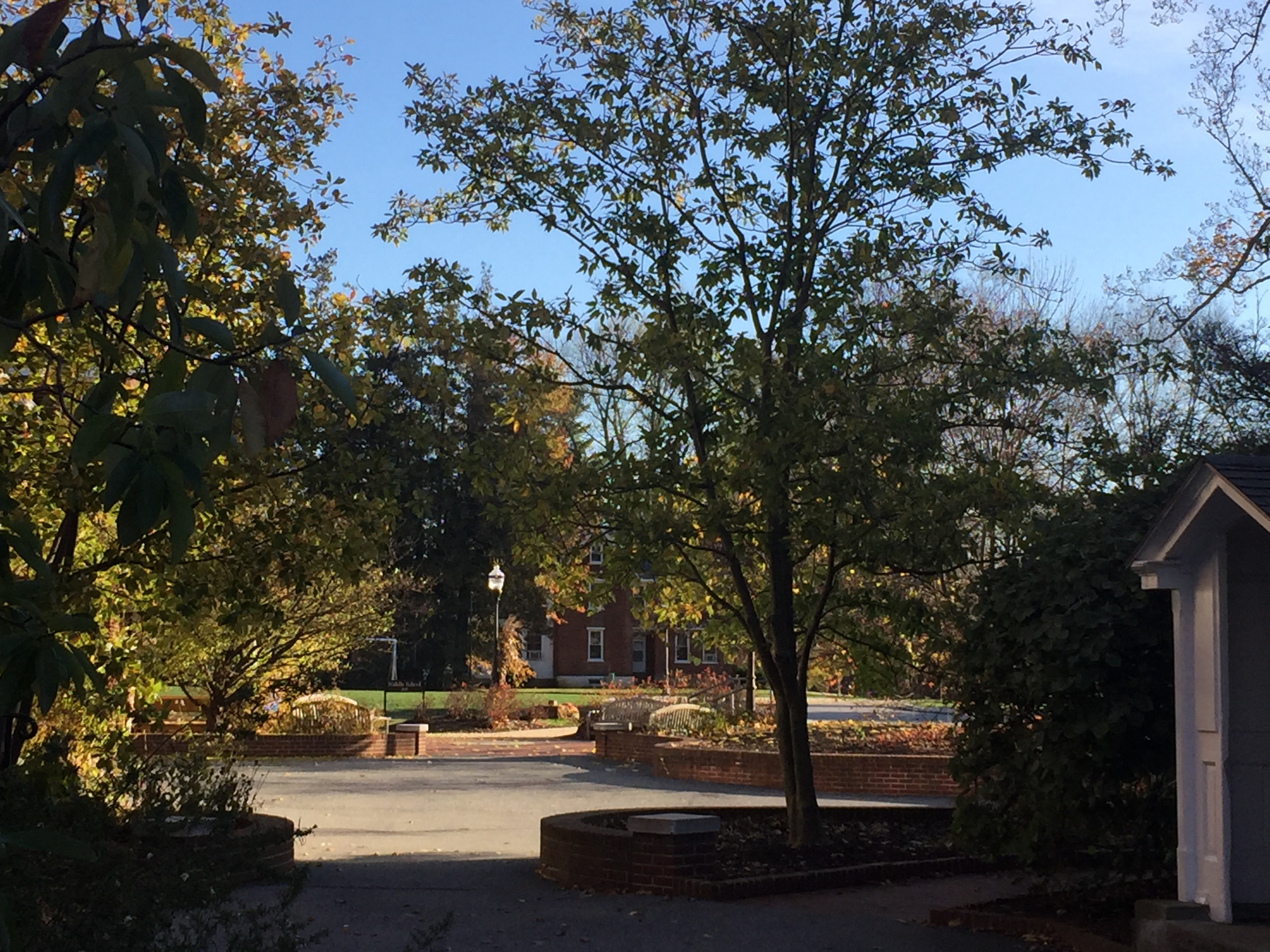
Middle school playground
