= Nymphaea brongniartii =

Nymphaea brongniartii Temporal range: 27.82–23.03 Ma Upper Oligocene

Scientific classification
- Kingdom: Plantae
- Clade: Tracheophytes
- Clade: Angiosperms
- Order: Nymphaeales
- Family: Nymphaeaceae
- Genus: Nymphaea
- Subgenus: Nymphaea subg. Lotos
- Species: †N. brongniartii

Binomial name
- †Nymphaea brongniartii (Caspary) Saporta

Fossil species of aquatic plant

Nymphaea brongniartii is a species of aquatic plant, which occurred in the upper Oligocene period of France.

== Description ==
=== Generative characteristics ===
The peduncle has 5-7 primary air canals. The flowers had four sepals, and at most 12 petals. There is a gap between petals and stamens. The androecium consists of more than 100 stamens. The gynoecium consists of 30-32 carpels. The operculate, arillate, ovoid seeds had longitudinal ridges.

== Taxonomy ==
=== Publication ===
It was described as †Anoectomeria brongniartii Caspary by Robert Caspary in 1856. It was emended by Butzmann and Fischer, 2013.

=== Position within Nymphaea ===
It is placed in Nymphaea subg. Lotos.
