= Conardia =

Scientific classification
- Kingdom: Plantae
- Division: Bryophyta
- Class: Bryopsida
- Subclass: Bryidae
- Order: Hypnales
- Family: Amblystegiaceae
- Genus: Conardia; H.Rob.

Genus of mosses

Conardia is a genus of mosses belonging to the family Amblystegiaceae.

The genus was first described by Harold E. Robinson.

The genus name of Conardia is in honour of Henry Shoemaker Conard (1874 - 1971), an American botanist who was a leading authority on bryophytes and water lilies, as well as an early advocate of environmental preservation.

The genus was circumscribed by Harold Ernest Robinson in Phytologia Vol.33 (Issue 4) on page 294 in 1976.

The species of this genus are found in Europe and Northern America.

Species:

- Conardia compacta H.Robinson, 1976
