= Nymphaea elisabethae =

Nymphaea elisabethae Temporal range: Chattian

Scientific classification
- Kingdom: Plantae
- Clade: Tracheophytes
- Clade: Angiosperms
- Order: Nymphaeales
- Family: Nymphaeaceae
- Genus: Nymphaea
- Subgenus: Nymphaea subg. Lotos
- Species: †N. elisabethae

Binomial name
- †Nymphaea elisabethae Gee and David W. Taylor

Fossil species of aquatic plant

Nymphaea elisabethae is a fossil species in the family Nymphaeaceae from the Chattian of Rott, near Bonn, Germany.

== Description ==
The ovate leaf has an entire margin. The basal sinus is narrow.

== Taxonomy ==
It was described by Carole Terry Gee and David Winship Taylor in 2016. It is placed in the subgenus Nymphaea subg. Lotos. However, this placement is quite uncertain and Nymphaea elisabethae may be closer to Nuphaea engelhardtii than to Nymphaea subg. Lotos.

=== Etymology ===
The specific epithet elisabethae honours Elisabeth Statz Blançon.
