= Paul Leslie Redfearn =

American botanist and lichenologist

Paul Leslie Redfearn Jr.
- Born: October 5, 1926; Sanford, Florida
- Died: November 26, 2018 (aged 92); Blue Springs, Missouri
- Education: Florida Southern College; University of Tennessee; Florida State University
- Scientific career
- Fields: Bryology
- Workplaces: U.S. Army Medical Service Corps (1950–1954); Missouri State University (1957–1988)
- Thesis: A study of the bryophytic vegetation of limestone outcrops in Florida (1957)
- Author abbrev. (botany): Redf.

Paul Leslie Redfearn Jr. (1926–2018) was an American professor of botany, specializing in mosses and liverworts. He was the president of the American Bryological and Lichenological Society from 1971 to 1973. He was the mayor of Springfield, Missouri from 1978 to 1981.

== Biography ==
After graduating from high school, Paul L. Redfearn Jr. served in the United States Army Air Corps in 1944 and 1945. He graduated in 1948 with B.S. from Florida Southern College and in 1949 with M.S. from the University of Tennessee. From 1950 to 1954 he served in the United States Army Medical Service Corps in California and Japan. He graduated from Florida State University with Ph.D. in 1957. He taught botany in the department of biology at Missouri State University from 1957 to 1988, when he retired as professor emeritus. In Springfield, Missouri, Redfearn served from 1973 to 1977 as a city council member in Zone 4 and from 1978 to 1981 as the mayor. (Springfield has council-manager government and Springfield's City Council has 4 Zones: numbered 1 for NW, 2 for NE, 3 for SW, 4 for SE. National Avenue in Zone 4 forms the eastern boundary of Missouri State University.)

Redfearn received several awards. In 1965 he was elected a Fellow of the American Association for the Advancement of Science. He was a member of many organizations and served as a volunteer curator at the Norland Henderson Herbarium of Powell Gardens in Kingsville, Missouri. Redfearn was from 1986 to 1992 the editor-in-chief of the journal Missouriensis of the Missouri Native Plants Society. Starting from 1996 he issued the exsiccata Mosses of the interior highlands exsiccatae with Bruce Allen and Robert Magill as co-editors.

In 1949 in Polk County, Florida, Paul Redfearn Jr. married Donna Alice Rubie Whitten. Upon his death he was survived by his widow, two sons, Paul Leslie III and James Jeffrey, two granddaughters, one step-grandson, and five great-grandchildren. Paul L. Redfearn III became a lawyer with a national reputation and from 1992 to 1993 was the president of the Missouri Association of Trial Attorneys.

== Selected publications ==
- Redfearn, Paul L.; Meyer, Samuel L. (1949). "Physiological Studies on Mosses. VIII. Observations on the Regeneration of Setae of Physcomitrium turbinatum". The Bryologist. 52 (4): 197–201. doi:10.1639/0007-2745(1949)52[197:PSOMVO]2.0.CO;2. JSTOR 3239476.
- Redfearn, Paul L. (1952). "The Bryophytes of Central and Southern Florida". The Bryologist. 55 (3): 193–210. doi:10.1639/0007-2745(1952)55[193:TBOCAS]2.0.CO;2. JSTOR 3239851.
- Huber, T. E.; Joseph, S. W.; Knoblock, E.; Redfearn, P. L.; Karakawa, J. A. (1954). "New Environmental Respiratory Disease (Yokohama Asthma). Preliminary Report". Arch. Indust. Hyg. & Occupational Med. 10 (5): 399–408. PMID 13206438.
- Andrews, Sharron; Redfearn, Paul L. (1965). "Observations on the Germination of the Gemmae of Hyophila tortula (Schwaegr.) Hampe". The Bryologist. 68 (3): 345–347. doi:10.2307/3240611. JSTOR 3240611.
- Redfearn, Paul L. (1972). "Mosses of the Interior Highlands of North America". Annals of the Missouri Botanical Garden. 59 (1): 1–104. Bibcode:1972AnMBG..59....1R. doi:10.2307/2394910. JSTOR 2394910.
- Redfearn, Paul L. (1976). "A Trichostomum from Texas New to the United States". The Bryologist. 79 (1): 80–82. doi:10.2307/3241870. JSTOR 3241870.
- Churchill, Steven P.; Redfearn, Paul L. (1977). "Hepaticae and Anthocerotae of Nebraska". The Bryologist. 80 (4): 640–645. doi:10.2307/3242423. JSTOR 3242423.
- Conard, Henry Shoemaker; Redfearn, P. L. (1979). How to Know the Mosses and Liverworts. W. C. Brown Company. ISBN 978-0-697-04769-4.
- Churchill, Steven P.; Redfearn, Paul L.; Ikenberry, Gilford J. (1981). "Contributions to the Oklahoma Moss Flora". The Bryologist. 84 (4): 498–504. doi:10.2307/3242557. JSTOR 3242557.
- Redfearn, Paul L. (1986). "Bryogeography of the Interior Highlands of North America: Taxa of Critical Importance". The Bryologist. 89 (1): 32–34. doi:10.2307/3243074. JSTOR 3243074.
- Redfearn, Paul L.; Wu, P.-C. (1986). "Catalog of the Mosses of China". Annals of the Missouri Botanical Garden. 73 (1): 177–208. Bibcode:1986AnMBG..73..177R. doi:10.2307/2399149. JSTOR 2399149.
- Ware, Stewart; Redfearn, Paul L.; Pyrah, Grant L.; Weber, Wallace R. (1992). "Soil pH, Topography and Forest Vegetation in the Central Ozarks". The American Midland Naturalist. 128 (1): 40–52. doi:10.2307/2426411. JSTOR 2426411.
- Redfearn Jr, P. L.; Tan, B. C.; He, S. (1996). "A newly updated and annotated checklist of Chinese mosses". Journal of the Hattori Botanical Laboratory. 79: 163–357.
- Timme, Stephen L.; Redfearn Jr, P. L. (1997). "Checklist of the liverworts and hornworts of the Interior Highlands of North America in Arkansas, Illinois, Missouri, and Oklahoma" (PDF). Evansia. 14 (3): 89–105. doi:10.5962/p.346415. S2CID 254345098.
