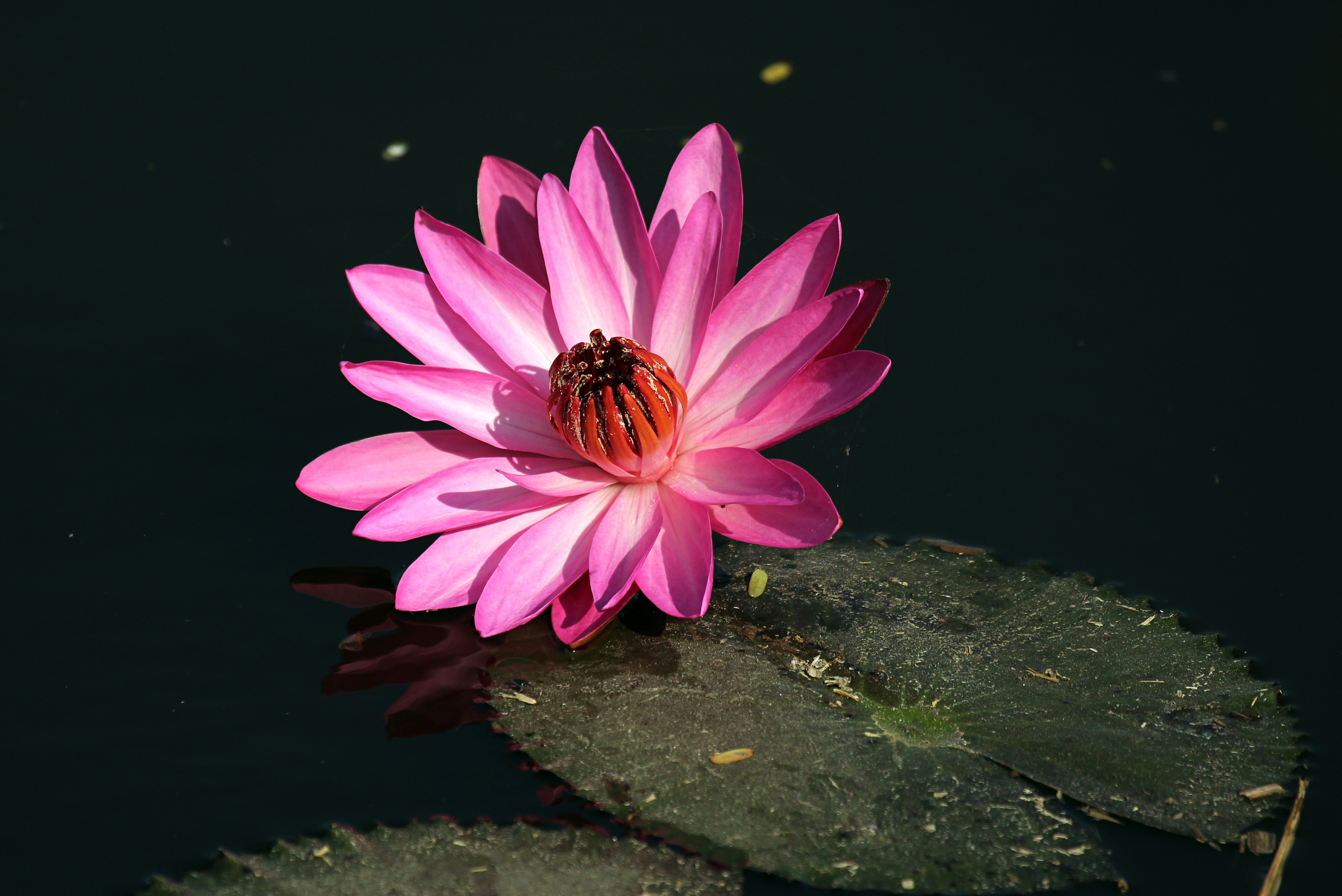
- Nymphaea rubra flowering in Karikalampakkam, India

Conservation status
- Least Concern (IUCN 3.1)

Scientific classification
- Kingdom: Plantae
- Clade: Tracheophytes
- Clade: Angiosperms
- Order: Nymphaeales
- Family: Nymphaeaceae
- Genus: Nymphaea
- Subgenus: Nymphaea subg. Lotos
- Species: N. rubra

Binomial name
- Nymphaea rubra Roxb. ex Andrews

Synonyms
- Castalia rubra (Roxb. ex Andrews) Tratt.; Leuconymphaea rubra (Roxb. ex Andrews) Kuntze; Nymphaea rubra var. purpurea DC.; Castalia magnifica Salisb.; Nymphaea magnifica (Salisb.) Conard; Nymphaea rubra subsp. latipetala Lovassy; Nymphaea rubra subsp. longiflora Lovassy; Nymphaea rubra subsp. sanguinolenta Lovassy

= Nymphaea rubra =

Species of water lily

Nymphaea rubra is a species of waterlily native to the region spanning from Sri Lanka and northeastern India to western and central Malesia. Additionally, it has been introduced to regions such as Southeast China, Cuba, Guyana, Hungary, and Suriname.

== Description ==
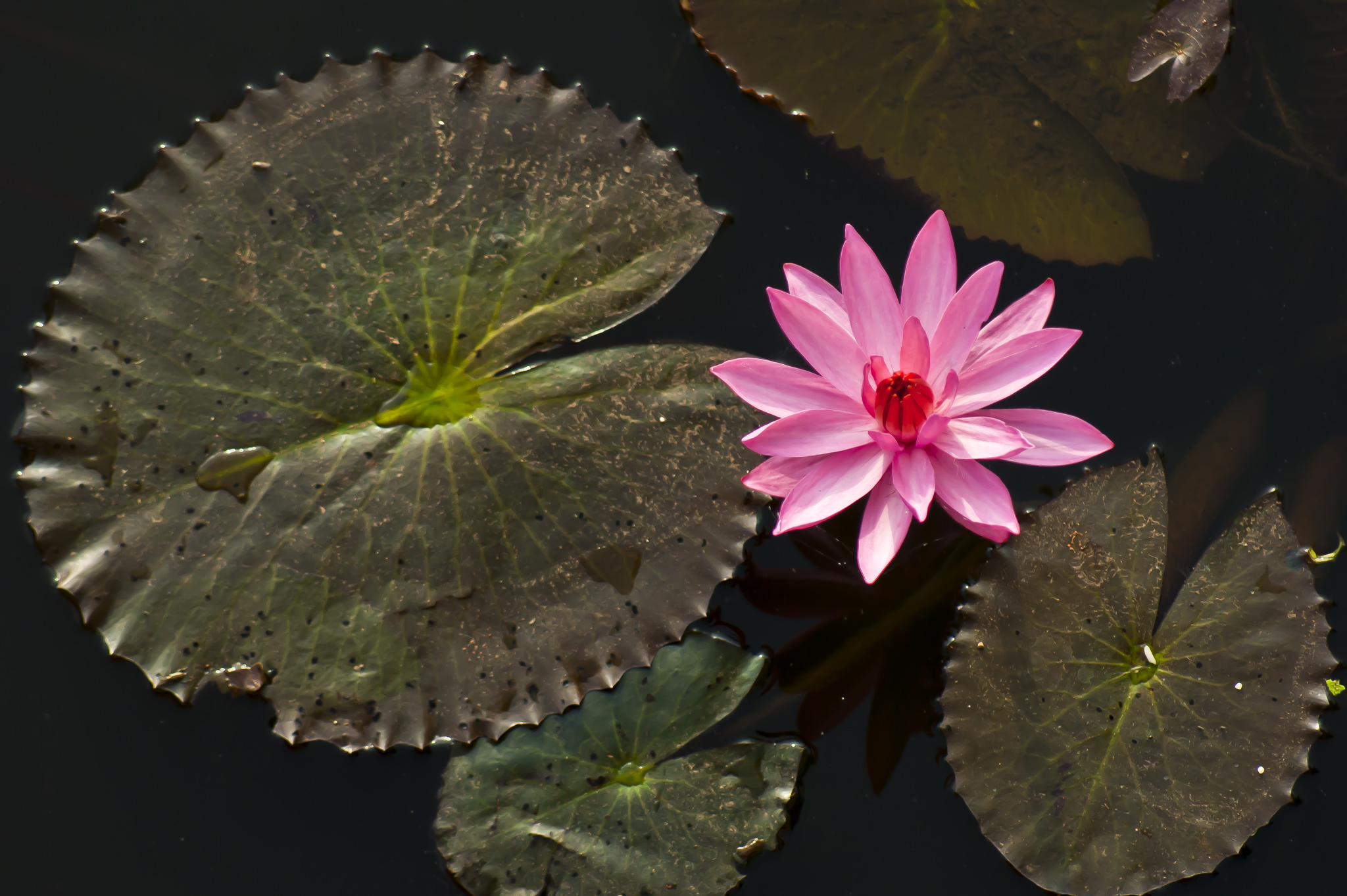
Leaf of Nymphaea rubra with dentate margin
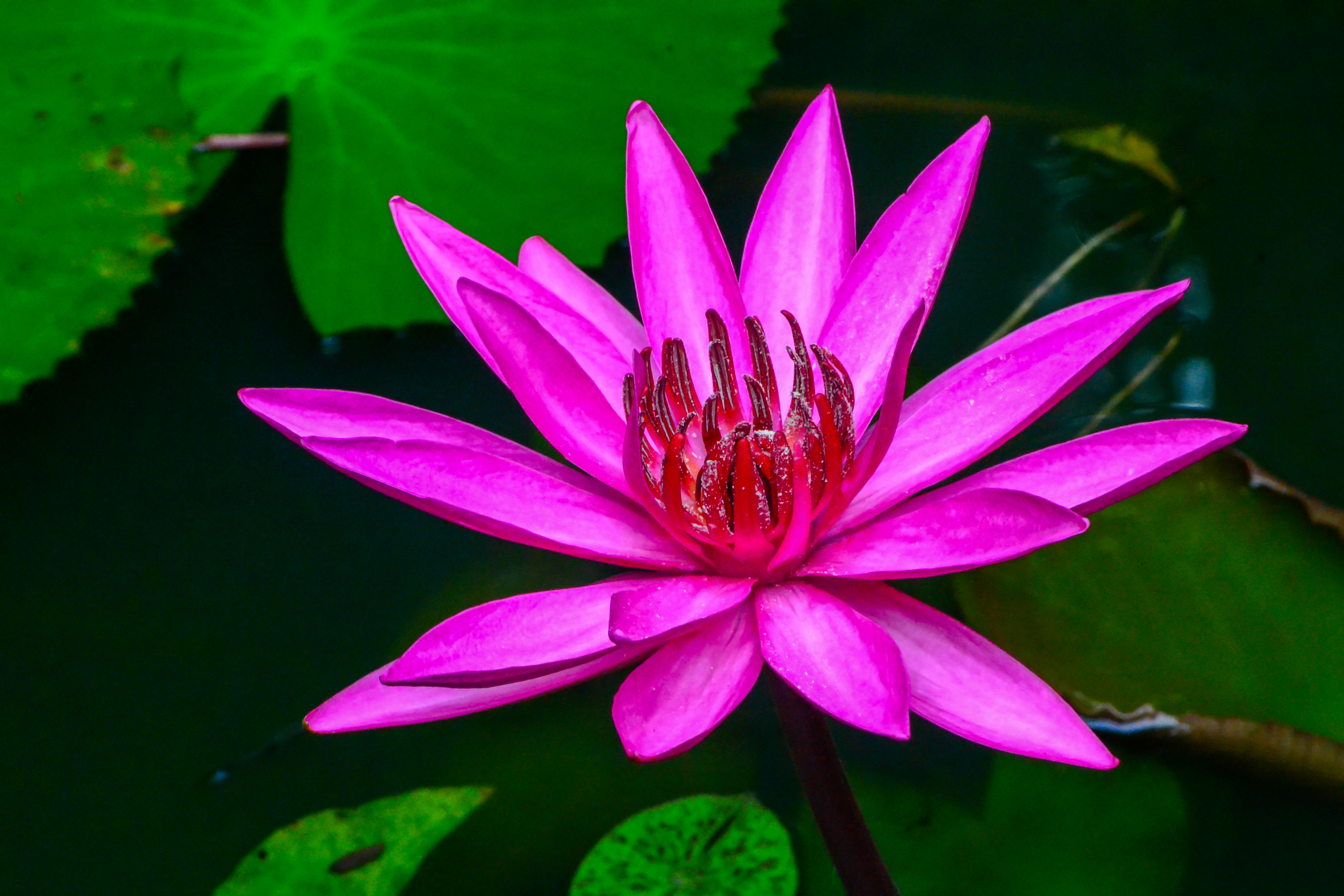
Stamens of Nymphaea rubra without sterile apical appendage

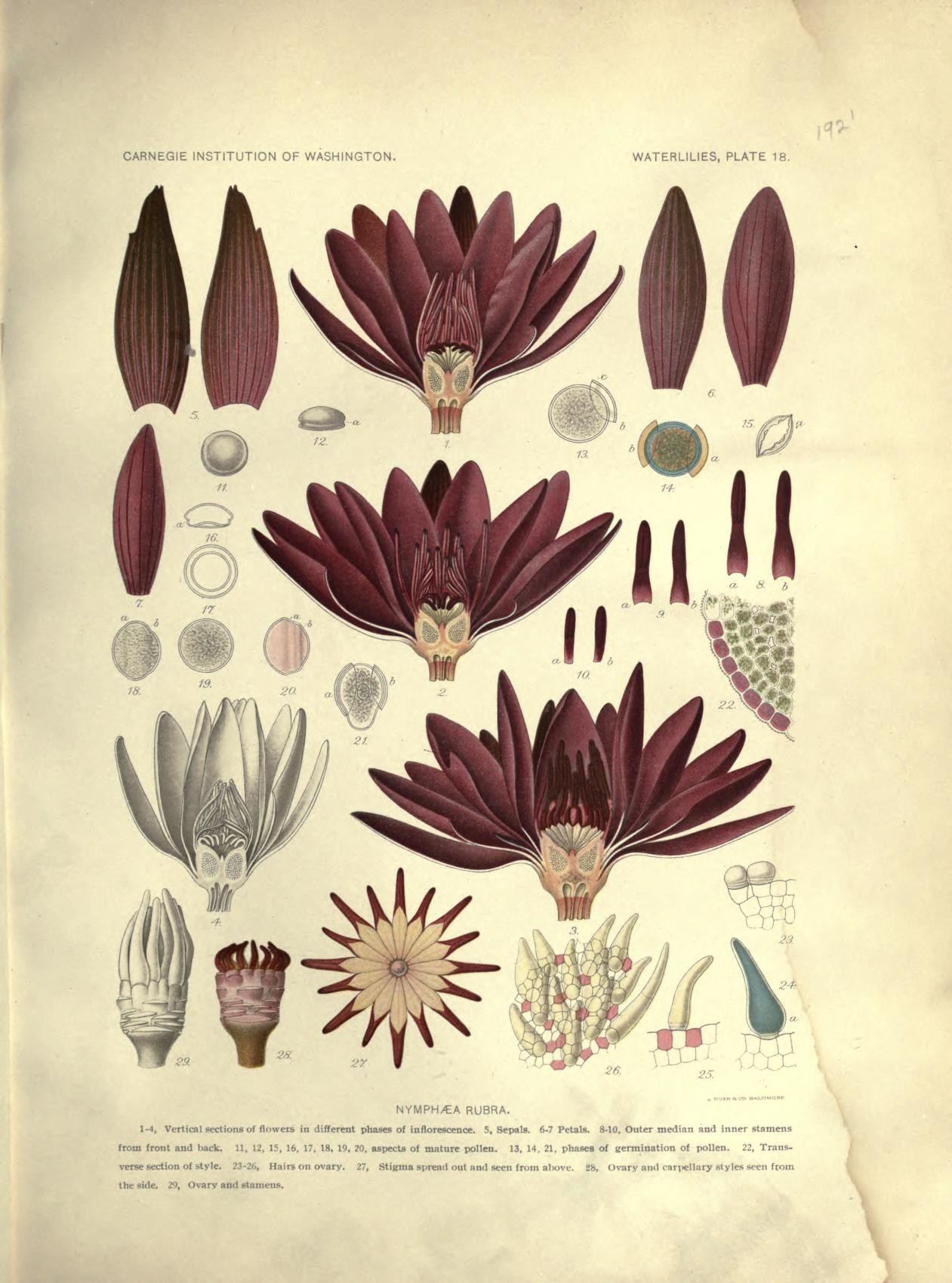
Botanical illustration of Nymphaea rubra in the publication "The waterlilies: a monograph of the genus Nymphaea" by Henry Shoemaker Conard

=== Vegetative characteristics ===
Nymphaea rubra has 15.1 cm long, and 7.9 cm wide rhizomes. The petiolate, orbicular leaves are 25–48 cm wide. The adaxial leaf surface is bronzy red to dark green, and the abaxial leaf surface is dark purple. The leaf venation is very prominent. The petiole is 140 cm long.

=== Generative characteristics ===
The flowers are 15–25 cm wide. The four purplish-red sepals are oblong to lanceolate. The 12–20 narrowly oval petals have a rounded apex. The androecium consists of 55 red stamens. The gynoecium consists of 16–21 carpels. The fruit bears 1.85 mm long, and 1.6 mm wide seeds. The peduncle is 116 cm long. The flowers are pleasantly fragrant.

== Cytology ==
The diploid chromosome count is 2n = 56.

== Reproduction ==
=== Vegetative reproduction ===
One case of the development of a proliferating pseudanthia has been reported for a Nymphaea rubra specimen cultivated in the Botanical Garden of the University of Heidelberg, Germany in 1886. It is stoloniferous, but in rare cases it can also reproduce through proliferating pseudanthia.

=== Generative reproduction ===
Nymphaea rubra may reproduce apomictically.

== Taxonomy ==
=== Publication ===
It was first named by William Roxburgh, but only later validly published by Henry Cranke Andrews in 1808. Its status is uncertain and it may be of hybrid origin.

=== Placement within Nymphaea ===
It is placed in Nymphaea subg. Lotos.

== Etymology ==
The specific epithet rubra means "red".

== Ecology ==
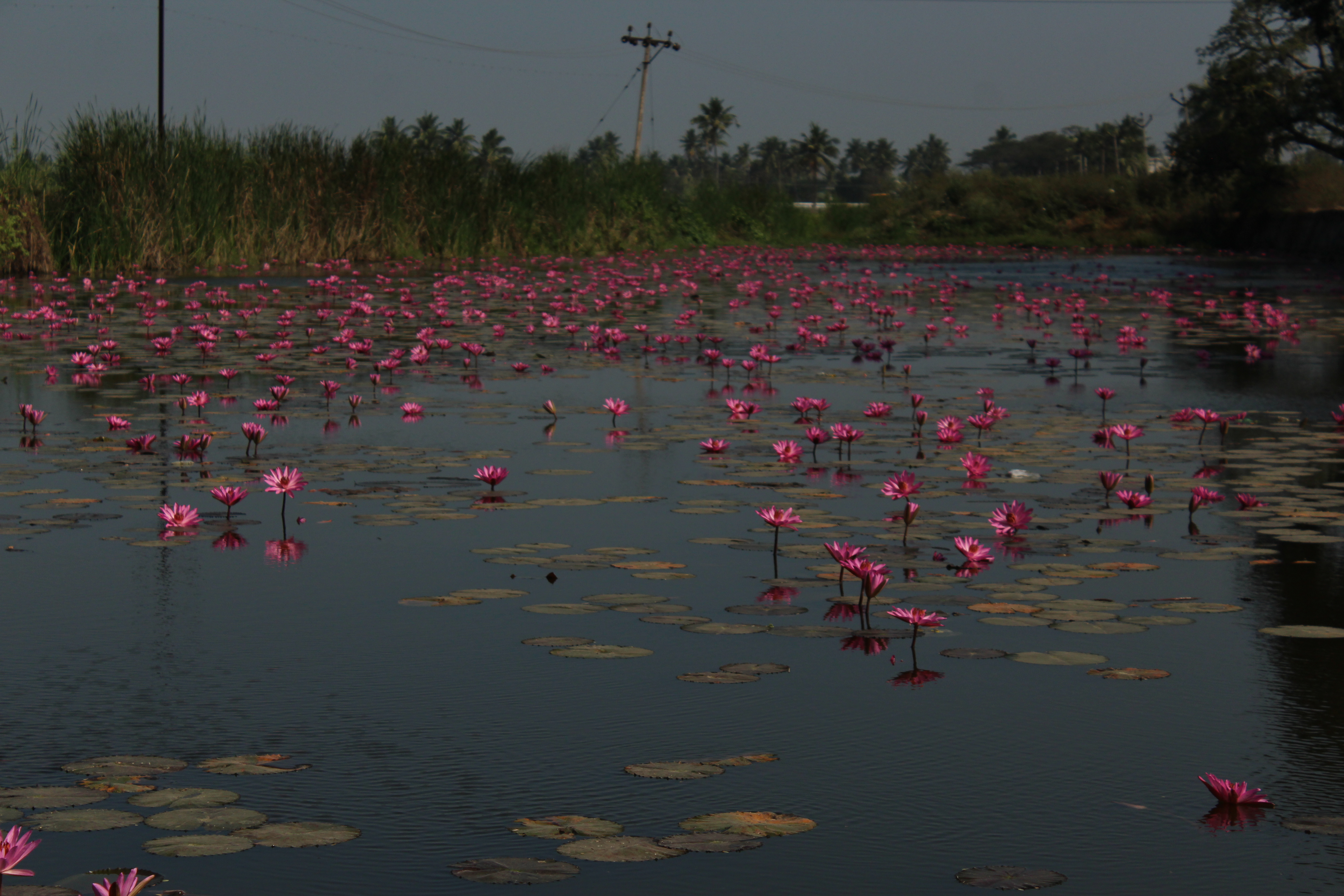
Numerous Nymphaea rubra flowering in a pond in Karikalampakkam, India

=== Habitat ===
It occurs in rivers, lakes, and ponds.

== Use ==
The peduncles, and seeds are used as food.

== Cultivation ==
It is suitable for the cultivation in aquaria.
