= Woyingzhichang =

One of China's largest online IT vocational job training and services firm

Woyingzhichang / 5Win
- Native name: 我赢职场
- Type: Private
- Industry: Online Education
- Founded: 2013 (Beijing)
- Founder: Shrek Qie
- Headquarters: Zhongguancun, Beijing, China
- Website: www.wyzc.com

Woyingzhichang Chinese: 我赢职场 (wyzc/5win/51zhichang) is one of China's largest online IT vocational job training and services firm. In Chinese, the name roughly translates to "winning in the job market." It was founded in 2013 as a spin-off from Uplooking Ltd., an offline school for IT Training based in Beijing with centers spread across nine Chinese cities. 51zhichang secured early backing from angel investor firm ZhenFund and has completed A-Round financing worth more than $5.64 million with support from the venture capital arm of the Chinese Academy of Sciences. In December, 2015, the firm announced a Pre-B round funding of an unspecified amount led by Shanghai Dingfeng Asset Management Co.

Currently, the firm has more than 10,000 hours of classroom instruction and more than 380 sets of original programs. It partners with Cisco, Red Hat, and Oracle to offer IT courses on technologies such as iOS and Android development, network and systems administration, big data analytics, and programming languages including C, C++, Java, and PHP.

According to its website, Woyingzhichang offers students who successfully complete its training programs a guaranteed job placement within six months, or they're entitled to their money back. Qualified teachers control module progression to ensure course success and students can earn tuition back by contributing to forums and assisting with questions.

Among 51zhichang's key competitors are Jikexueyuan "Geek School," and Tarena.
