= Columbia Global Center Beijing =

Columbia Global Center Beijing is a research facility established by Columbia University in Beijing, China, and is a part of the Columbia Global Centers network. Founded in March 2009, it aims to facilitate Columbia University with research and other events throughout the region. Xiaobo Lü, professor of political science at Barnard College and former director of the Weatherhead East Asian Institute at Columbia, served as the first Director of the East Asia center, followed by Chinese economist Geng Xiao.

== Major programs ==
=== The Summer Palace Dialogue ===
The Summer Palace Dialogue (SPD) is an annual economic conference that brings together leading economists and minister level decision makers from both China and America for two days of debate about issues and concerns that affect both sides. It was founded by former Vice Chairman of the Joint Chiefs of Staff and current Chairman of AEA Investors Admiral Bill Owens and Vice Minister Liu He of the Chinese Central Leading Group on Financial and Economic Affairs, and is currently co-hosted by the Chinese Economist 50 Forum and Columbia Global Centeres | Beijing. The Summer Palace dialog is currently planning its 3rd annual conference which is scheduled to take place during mid September. Past years' Dialogues centered on the 2008 financial crisis and U.S.-China cooperation on climate change.

=== The Urban China Initiative ===
The Urban China Initiative (UCI) is a non-profit research project launched by Tsinghua University, McKinsey & Company, and Columbia Global Center Beijing. It aimes to establish a think-tank in Beijing to help China meet the challenges of urbanization.

=== The Initiative for Policy Dialogue ===
The Initiative for Policy Dialogue (IPD) is an annual conference co-organized by the Initiative for Policy Dialogue of Columbia University, and the Central University of Finance and Economics. Participants include Nobel Laureate and Columbia University Professor Joseph Stiglitz. During October 2009, Columbia Global Center Beijing assisted Initiative For Policy Dialogue in organizing a conference in Beijing with The China Task Force, a collaborative research project of IPD with several Chinese and British universities.

=== The International Healthcare Leadership Conference Series ===
The International Healthcare Leadership (IHL) Conference Series is an annual conference co-organized by International Health Leadership of Columbia University, Columbia Global Center Beijing, and China CEO magazine in an effort to design and implement educational programs in healthcare management and policy for Chinese government officials and health care executives. In July 2011, the IHL and its partners hosted an event at PricewaterhouseCoopers in Beijing on multidrug-resistant organisms, and how effective hospital management policy can help treat and prevent its spread.

=== Internship programs ===
Columbia Global Center Beijing explores and identifies internship and summer opportunities at local universities, organizations and businesses for Columbia University students wishing to obtain first-hand experience in China.

== Advisory board ==
Current members of the advisory board includes:

- Wei Christianson – Co-CEO of Asia Pacific at Morgan Stanley
- Anna Fang – CEO of ZhenFund
- Bruno Wu – Chairman of Sun Redrock Group
- Kai-Fu Lee – Chairman and CEO of Innovation Works, former president of Google China and founding director of Microsoft Research Asia
- Charles Li – Chairman of Hong Kong Exchanges and Clearing
- Cherie Nursalim – Chairwoman, Three on the Bund; Vice Chairman, Giti Group
- Wang Boming – Editor-in-chief, Caijing magazine
- Xue Lan – Dean of Schwarzman College, Tsinghua University
- Yang Lan – chairperson of the Sun Media Group and the Sun Culture Foundation, former China Central Television and Phoenix Television host
