= Richard Ong =

Malaysian businessman and investor (born 1965)

- Chinese: 王忠信
Transcriptions
Standard Mandarin
- Hanyu Pinyin: Wáng Zhōngxìn
Yue: Cantonese
- Jyutping: Wong4 Zung1 Seon3
Southern Min
- Hokkien POJ: Ông Tiong-sìn
- Tâi-lô: Ông Tiong-sìn

Richard Ong Tiong Sin (born 1965) is a Malaysian businessman and investor. He is the founder, chairman, and CEO of RRJ Capital, one of the largest private equity funds based in Asia. Richard was also a founder and CEO of Hopu Investment Management, a Beijing-based private equity fund.

== Career ==
=== Early career ===
Ong started his finance career at Chase Manhattan Bank, where he worked for three years as a mergers banker; he also spent a year at Prudential Bache International.

=== Goldman Sachs ===
Ong joined Goldman Sachs in 1993 and became a partner of the firm seven years later. He was later named to the position of co-president of Goldman's Singapore office.

In 2006, Ong was promoted to the position of co-head of Asia investment banking, replacing Bill Wicker, who moved to New York. GS moved Ong from Singapore to Beijing with the intention that he would also become CEO of their Beijing joint venture Goldman Sachs Gao Hua Securities, Co. However, Ong's weak knowledge of written Chinese led him to fail a language ability examination required to take up his new position. The China Securities Regulatory Commission (CSRC) had required since 2004 that CEOs, deputy CEOs, and heads of supervisory boards at locally incorporated securities firms all pass the examination; however many CEOs and deputy CEOs of other securities companies were not able to pass the CSRC examination as well, but were given waivers. Goldman elevated the joint venture's deputy CEO Zha Xiangyang to the CEO post in Ong's place.

One industry observer criticised the decision by CSRC to deny Ong his new position as "short sighted and xenophobic", also noting that it served as a wake-up call to overseas Chinese that shared ethnicity was not a guarantee of success in the mainland China market. A China Economic Review editorial speculated that the language proficiency issue was merely a pretext, and that the true reason that CSRC denied Goldman permission to name Ong to his new position was due to his family ties to Singaporean sovereign wealth fund Temasek Holdings and his own role in the money-losing sale of former Thai prime minister Thaksin Shinawatra's Shin Corporation to Temasek.

=== Hopu Investment Management ===
In January 2008, Ong resigned from his position at GS, ending a fifteen-year tenure there; his departure was seen as a major blow to the firm. He stated that he planned to return to Malaysia to spend time with his family and work in his family business. It soon emerged that he would be joining fellow former GS executive Fang Fenglei at Hopu Investment Management, a new China private equity fund established by Fang. Goldman planned to invest roughly US$300 million of their own money in the new fund, while Temasek would provide another US$1 billion. The total size of the fund was planned at US$2 billion; interest from potential investors far exceeded that amount, according to unnamed sources. In 2010 the fund began winding down when it announced that Hopu Investment Management would not be raising a second fund.

=== RRJ Capital ===
RRJ Capital, a private equity firm based in Hong Kong and Singapore, was founded in March 2011 by Ong.

== Personal life ==
Ong is of Chinese descent and was born in Malaysia. He received a bachelor's degree from Cornell University in 1986 and then an MBA from the University of Chicago in 1989. His brother Charles Ong was the chief strategist of Singaporean sovereign wealth fund Temasek Holdings and is currently co-CEO and co-chairman of RRJ Capital.
