= Laetitia Moon Conard =

American college professor and politician (1871–1946)

- Laetitia Moon Conard, from a 1932 newspaper
- Born: Elizabeth Laetitia Moon; May 9, 1871; Fallsington, Pennsylvania
- Died: November 29, 1946 (aged 75); Grinnell, Iowa
- Occupations: College instructor, politician, community leader, activist
- Spouse: Henry Shoemaker Conard

Elizabeth Laetitia Moon Conard (May 9, 1871 – November 29, 1946) was an American college instructor, politician, community leader and activist, based in Iowa. She taught sociology and economics at Grinnell College, and ran for governor of Iowa in 1932.

== Early life and education ==
Elizabeth Laetitia Moon was born in Fallsington, Pennsylvania, the daughter of James H. Moon and Elizabeth Balderston Moon. Her parents were Quakers, and she attended Westtown School. She graduated from Smith College with a bachelor's degree in 1894, and a master's degree in 1896. She pursued further studies at the Sorbonne, and completed a doctorate in comparative religion at the University of Chicago in 1899, with a dissertation titled "Ideas of the Future Life Held by Algonkin Indian Tribes". It was the second doctorate awarded by the comparative religion department at Chicago. She later earned further credentials in economics and sociology at Columbia University.

== Career ==
Moon's doctoral research was published in 1900 as "Les idées des Indiens algonquins relatives a la vie d'outre-tombe" in the Revue de l'histoire des religions, and in 1903 as "The Idea of God Held by North American Indians" in The American Journal of Theology. During the same time, in 1901, she wrote an obituary notice about religion scholar Léon Marillier for The Open Court.

Conard taught correspondence courses for the University of Chicago in 1905. When her husband became a professor at Grinnell College, she moved to Grinnell, Iowa. She helped to found the First Friends Church of Grinnell, and the city's League of Women Voters chapter. She was a longtime board member of the Grinnell Social Service Committee, and a member of the Iowa Association for Public Welfare.

Conard officially joined the faculty at Grinnell College in the mid-1920s, and helped establish the sociology department. She was never paid for teaching sociology or economics courses, nor admitted to the rank or title of Professor, because her husband was a professor. Her students did field work in the town of Grinnell, visiting workers in their homes. She retired from teaching in 1941.

Conard campaigned for Robert M. LaFollette when he ran for president in 1924. She ran for governor of Iowa in 1932, for a Congressional seat in 1934, for a Senate seat in 1936, and for lieutenant governor in 1940, always on the Socialist Party ticket. She published articles on the socioeconomic effects of the Great Depression in Social Forces and The American Journal of Sociology.

== Personal life ==
Laetitia Moon married another Pennsylvania Quaker, botanist Henry Shoemaker Conard (1874–1971) in 1900. They had three children, Elizabeth, Rebecca, and Alfred. They retired to Florida in 1944. She died in Grinnell in 1946, aged 75 years.
