= Hopu Investment Management =

Chinese alternative investment firm

Hopu Investment Management Co. Ltd.
- Native name: 厚朴投资管理有限公司
- Type: Private
- Industry: Alternative investments
- Founded: 2008; 18 years ago
- Founders: Fang Fenglei; Richard Ong; Dominic Ho
- Headquarters: Singapore
- Key people: Fang Fenglei (chairman); Gunther Hamm (president)
- Products: Private equity
- AUM: US$15 billion (2025)
- Number of employees: 70+ (2025)
- Website: www.hopucap.com

Hopu Investment Management Co. Ltd. (Chinese: 厚朴投资; pinyin: Hòupǔ Tóuzī Guǎnlǐ) is an Asia focused private equity investment firm founded in 2008 that is headquartered in Singapore with additional offices in Hong Kong and Beijing.

Hopu pursues a strategy focused on control‑oriented and large proprietary transactions, including buyout and carveout opportunities across Asia. The firm targets sectors such as technology, consumer, logistics and financial services.

== Background ==
Hopu was founded in 2008 by Fang Fenglei, Richard Ong and Dominic Ho. Fang and Ong were previously senior executives at Goldman Sachs while Ho was former head of KPMG China.

Hopu's first fund of $2.5 billion included Goldman Sachs and Temasek as its cornerstone investors. At the time, Hopu's description as private equity fund was criticized since it stated it would invest in Chinese local companies yet its two largest deals were acquisitions of shares in Bank of China and China Construction Bank sold by Royal Bank of Scotland and Bank of America respectively.

In November 2010, it was reported that Hopu will not be raising a second fund, signalling the eventual winding down of the firm. By then Hopu was able to source deals in China establishing a record that many international firms were unable to replicate. Ho who had already long planned his retirement would retire from Hopu at that time.

In February 2011, Ong left Hopu to found his own firm, RRJ Capital as Hopu looked closer to winding down.

In November 2013 after a two-year hiatus, Hopu returned to the private equity scene by raising a US$2 billion for its second fund.

In February 2017, Hopu and Arm Holdings established the Hopu-Arm Innovation Fund. The fund owns part of Arm's China unit, which was spun off by SoftBank Group in 2018.

In December 2017, Hopu targeted $2.5 billion in fundraising for its third fund - which closed in 2018 at US$2.5 billion, according to Preqin.

In 2018, Fang hired Zhang Hongli, who was previously vice president of Industrial and Commercial Bank of China (ICBC) and gave him a large stake in Hopu. However the two fell out and Fang drew up plans to reorganize Hopu to marginalize Zhang. In 2021, Zhang and then-Hopu CEO, Lau Teck Sien launched a boardroom coup in an attempt to take over Hopu. In June 2023, Fang quietly settled with Lau, who stepped aside. A few months later Zhang was detained by the Central Commission for Discipline Inspection and pled guilty to charges of accepting bribes while at ICBC.

In 2021, Hopu launched the Hopu Magnolia Fund that was focused on China growth capital. In April 2023, it was reported it had raised $141 million of its trimmed $250 million target.

In 2025, Hopu returned US$1.2 billion to its limited partners. Fund III reached a DPI (Distributions to Paid-In Capital) of 66% around 2025-end, more than twice the average for similar Asian funds.

In 2026, according to an interview with the firm’s president, Gunther Hamm, it was stated that more than half of the revenues generated by companies in its Fund III portfolio were derived from outside China. Hopu Investments has become the first fund management company established under Macau’s Investment Fund Law, effective January of the same year.

== Notable deals ==
In February 2014, Hopu led a consortium to arrange a private placement of $2.1 billion in new shares issued by GLP's China operation. In July 2017, Hopu led a consortium of investors including Hillhouse Investment, Vanke and Bank of China bought won a bid to take GLP private by buyout. The deal worth $11.6 billion was the largest private equity buyout in Asia at the time.

In 2018, Hopu became one of the key stakeholders of Arm China through a carve‑out transaction that separated the business from Arm Holdings and resulted in a consortium acquiring a 51% stake in its China operation.

In 2018, Hopu acquired a significant minority stake in FWD as part of a funding round that strengthened the insurer’s growth across 10 Asian markets

In 2019, Hopu made its initial investment in Ceva Santé Animale through its third flagship fund.In March 2025, the firm re-upped in the sixth founding round of Ceva alongside other backers such as Singapore state investor Temasek.

Hopu remained a shareholder through Iluvatar CoreX's January 2026 IPO on the Hong Kong Stock Exchange, which raised approximately HK$3.7 billion.

== See also ==
- RRJ Capital
- ZhenFund
