= Henry Shoemaker Conard =

American botanist (1874–1971)

Henry S. Conard
- Born: September 12, 1874; Philadelphia, Pennsylvania
- Died: October 7, 1971 (aged 97); Haines City, Florida
- Education: Haverford College (B.S. 1894, M.S. 1895) and University of Pennsylvania (Ph.D. 1901)
- Awards: Eminent Ecologist Award from the Ecological Society of America (1954)
- Scientific career
- Fields: Botany, bryology
- Workplaces: Grinnell College (1906–1955)

Henry Shoemaker Conard (1874 - 1971) was an American botanist. Conard, a leading authority on bryophytes and water lilies, was also an early advocate of environmental preservation. From 1906 to 1955, he worked at Grinnell College in Grinnell, Iowa. In 1954, he became the first to receive the Eminent Ecologist Award from the Ecological Society of America.

In 1969, Grinnell acquired a 365-acre (1.48 km^{2}) plot of cropland and established the Conard Environmental Research Area, in recognition of the legacy of the longtime professor.

== Early years ==
Conard was born September 12, 1874, in Philadelphia, Pennsylvania, to Thomas Pennington Conard, director of the West Grove boarding school, and Rebecca Savery Baldwin Conard. His uncle, Alfred Fellenberg Conard, was a horticulturist, specializing in the development and sale of rose varieties. Henry Conard attended Friends' Select School in Philadelphia from 1881 to 1888. He entered Westtown Friends' Boarding School in Westtown Township, Pennsylvania in 1889 and graduated as valedictorian in 1892. He then enrolled at Haverford College, where he earned a B.S. in biology in 1895 and an M.A. in biology in 1895. While at Haverford, he was inducted into Phi Beta Kappa.

== Career ==
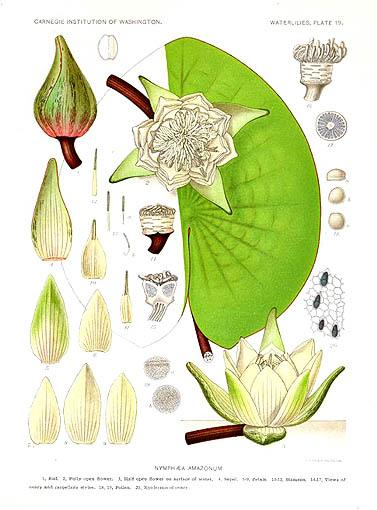
Waterlilies (1905), from Conard's monograph

After a short time teaching science in Westtown, he entered the University of Pennsylvania as a Harrison Fellow in Biology in 1899, completing his Ph.D. in botany in 1901 and joining Sigma Xi. After receiving his doctorate, Conard taught botany at the university from 1901 to 1905. From 1905 to 1906, he was a Johnston Scholar at Johns Hopkins University.

In 1906, Conard left Johns Hopkins to take a professorship in botany at Grinnell College. During his tenure at Grinnell, Professor Conard served as chair of the department of botany and, starting in 1935, as Chairman of the Faculty. He received emeritus faculty status in 1944. After his retirement, Professor Conard continued to be academically active, notably curating the bryophyte collections at the University of Iowa and running the Moss Clinic at the Iowa Lakeside Laboratory.

He is honoured in the naming in 1976, of Conardia, which is a genus of mosses belonging to the family Amblystegiaceae.

== Personal life ==
Conard's first wife, E. Letitia Moon Conard, was a sociologist and politician who died in 1946. He married Louisa Sargent in 1950, with whom he moved to Florida in 1955, where they resided until his death on October 7, 1971, in Haines City, Florida. He had three children, Elizabeth Conard, Rebecca Conard and Alfred F. Conard. Alfred Fletcher Conard (1911-2009) graduated from Grinnell College in 1932, while his father was still on the college faculty, and proceeded to join the faculty of the University of Michigan Law School in 1954 and receive an honorary doctorate from Grinnell in 1971.

== Selected publications ==
- The Waterlilies: A Monograph of the Genus Nymphaea. Washington: Carnegie Institution of Washington. 1905 – via Internet Archive.
- The Structure and Life-history of Hay-scented Fern. Washington D.C.: Carnegie Institution of Washington. 1908 – via Biodiversity Heritage Library.
- How to Know the Mosses. Pictured-Keys for Determining Many of the North American Mosses and Liverworts, with Suggestions and Aids for Their Study. William C. Brown. 1944.
  - How to Know the Mosses and Liverworts, 2nd edition with 55 added picture keys, 1956
- with Paul L. Redfearn Jr.: How to Know the Mosses and Liverworts (1979), revised 2nd edition, Dubuque, Iowa: W.C. Brown
