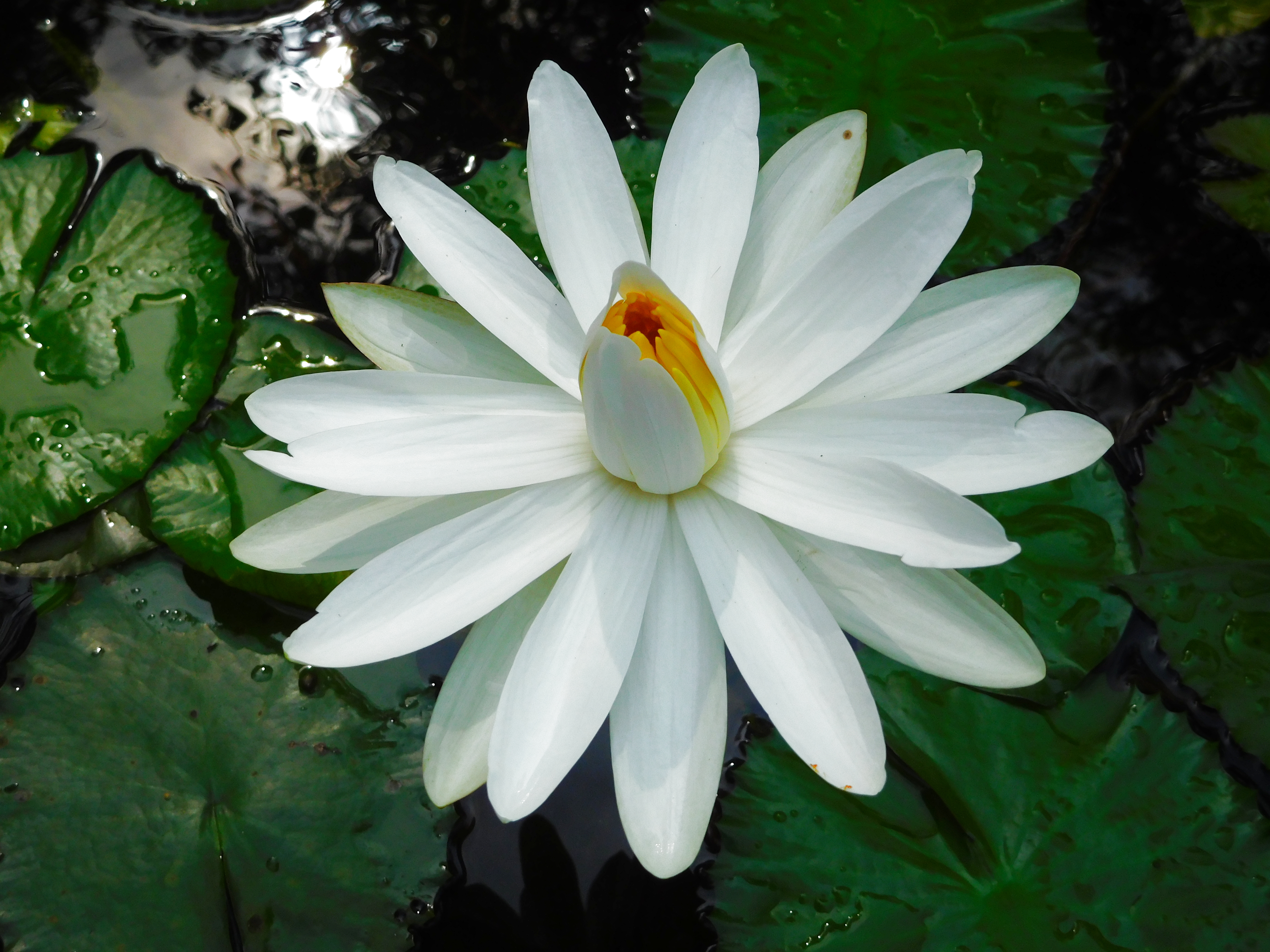
- water lily (Nymphaea pubescens)

Conservation status
- Least Concern (IUCN 3.1)

Scientific classification
- Kingdom: Plantae
- Clade: Tracheophytes
- Clade: Angiosperms
- Order: Nymphaeales
- Family: Nymphaeaceae
- Genus: Nymphaea
- Subgenus: Nymphaea subg. Lotos
- Species: N. pubescens

Binomial name
- Nymphaea pubescens Willd.

Synonyms
- Castalia pubescens (Willd.) Wood; Nymphaea lotus var. pubescens (Willd.) Hook.f. & Thomson; Nymphaea devoniensis Hook.; Nymphaea purpurea Rehnelt & F.Henkel; Nymphaea semisterilis Lehm.

= Nymphaea pubescens =

Species of water lily

Nymphaea pubescens, the hairy water lily or pink water-lily, is a species of water lily.

== Description ==
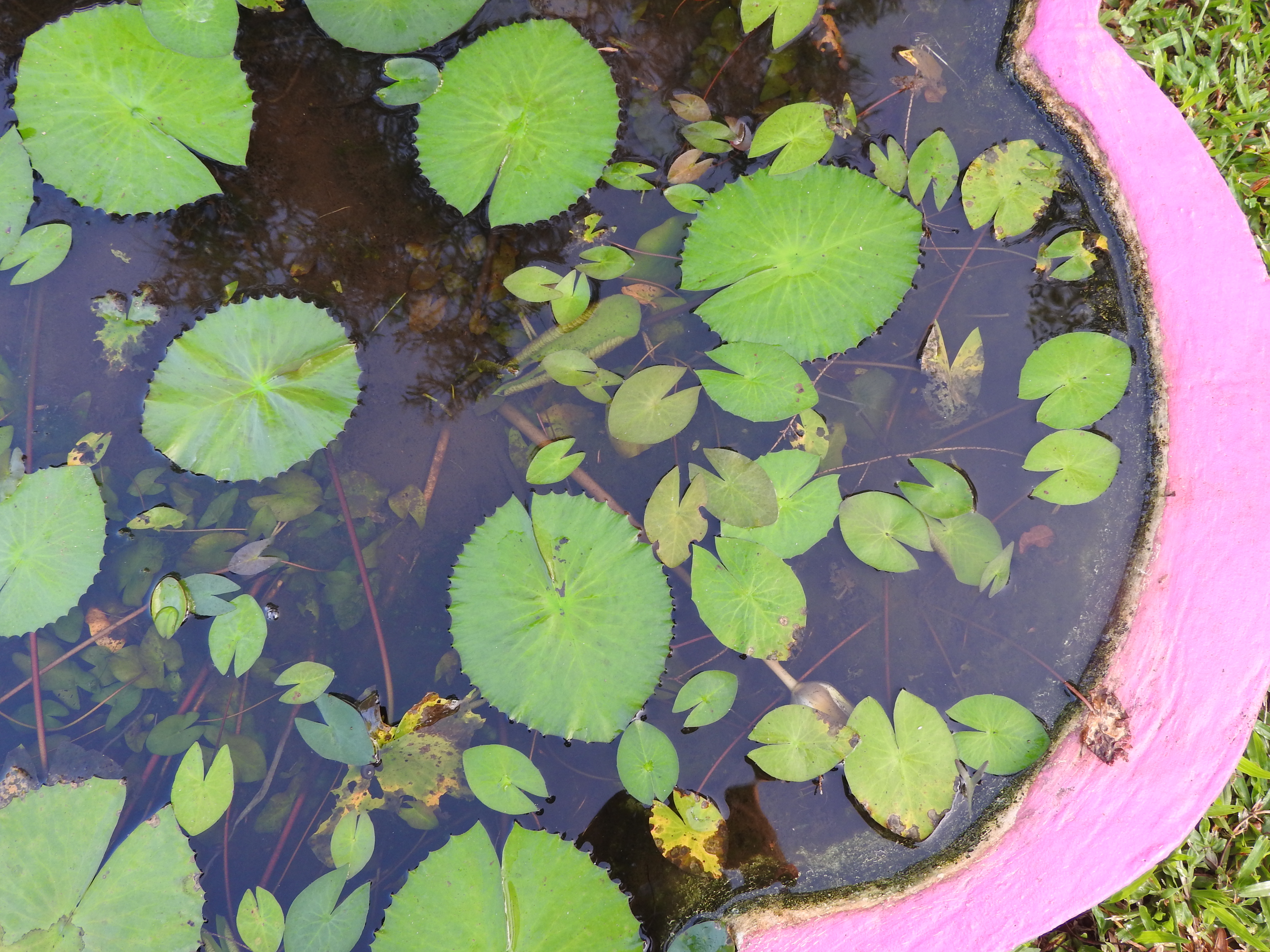
Adaxial leaf surface of Nymphaea pubescens

=== Vegetative characteristics ===
Nymphaea pubescens is an annual or perennial, rhizomatous, aquatic herb with erect, stoloniferous, tuberous, up to 8 cm long rhizomes bearing slim stolons. The petiolate, ovate, elliptic, suborbicular, orbicular, or sagittate leaves with a dentate margin are 15–40 cm long, and 12–35 cm wide. The abaxial leaf surface is pubescent.

=== Generative characteristics ===
The flowers are quite large, about 15 cm in diameter when fully open. They tend to close during the daytime and open wide at night. Their color varies from white to pink, mauve or purple depending from the variety or hybrid.

== Taxonomy ==
It was published by Carl Ludwig Willdenow in 1799. It is placed in Nymphaea subg. Lotos.

=== Etymology ===
The specific epithet pubescens means with soft short hairs.

== Distribution and habitat ==
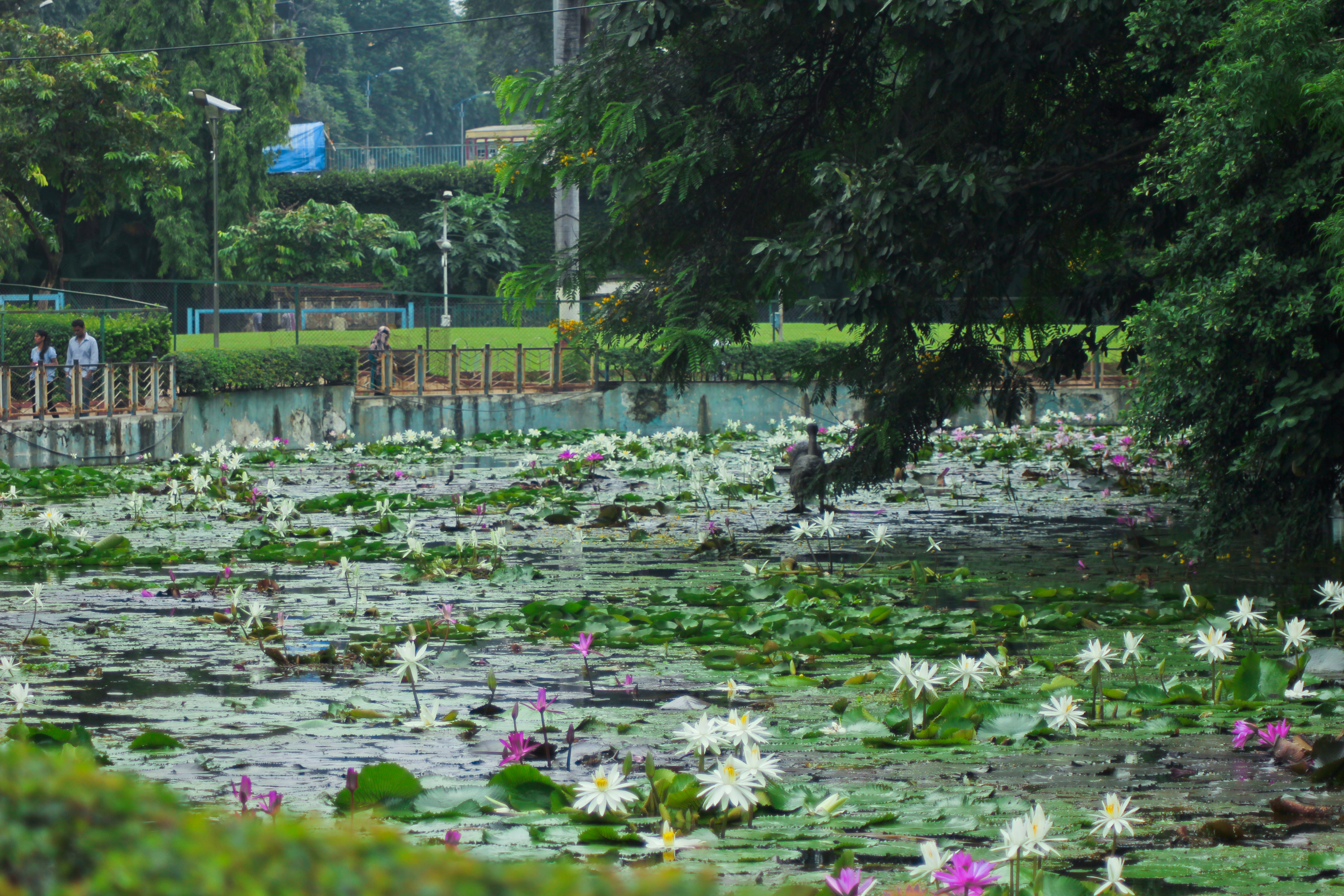
White and pink Nymphaea pubescens blooming in a pond.

This plant is common in shallow lakes and ponds throughout temperate and tropical Asia: Bangladesh, India, Sri Lanka, Yunnan, Taiwan, Philippines, Cambodia, Laos, Myanmar, Thailand, Vietnam, Indonesia and Malaysia.

It is also found in northeastern Australia and Papua New Guinea.

The hairy water lily is found both as a cultivated plant as well as in the wild. It prefers non-acidic waters and it does not tolerate temperatures below 15 °C.

== Use ==
Nymphaea pubescens is used as an aquarium plant for large aquaria.

== Common names ==
Nymphaea pubescens is known kokaa in Hindi and Kumuda in Sanskrit.
