= Bad Häring =

Bad Häring Bod Hearing
- Municipality
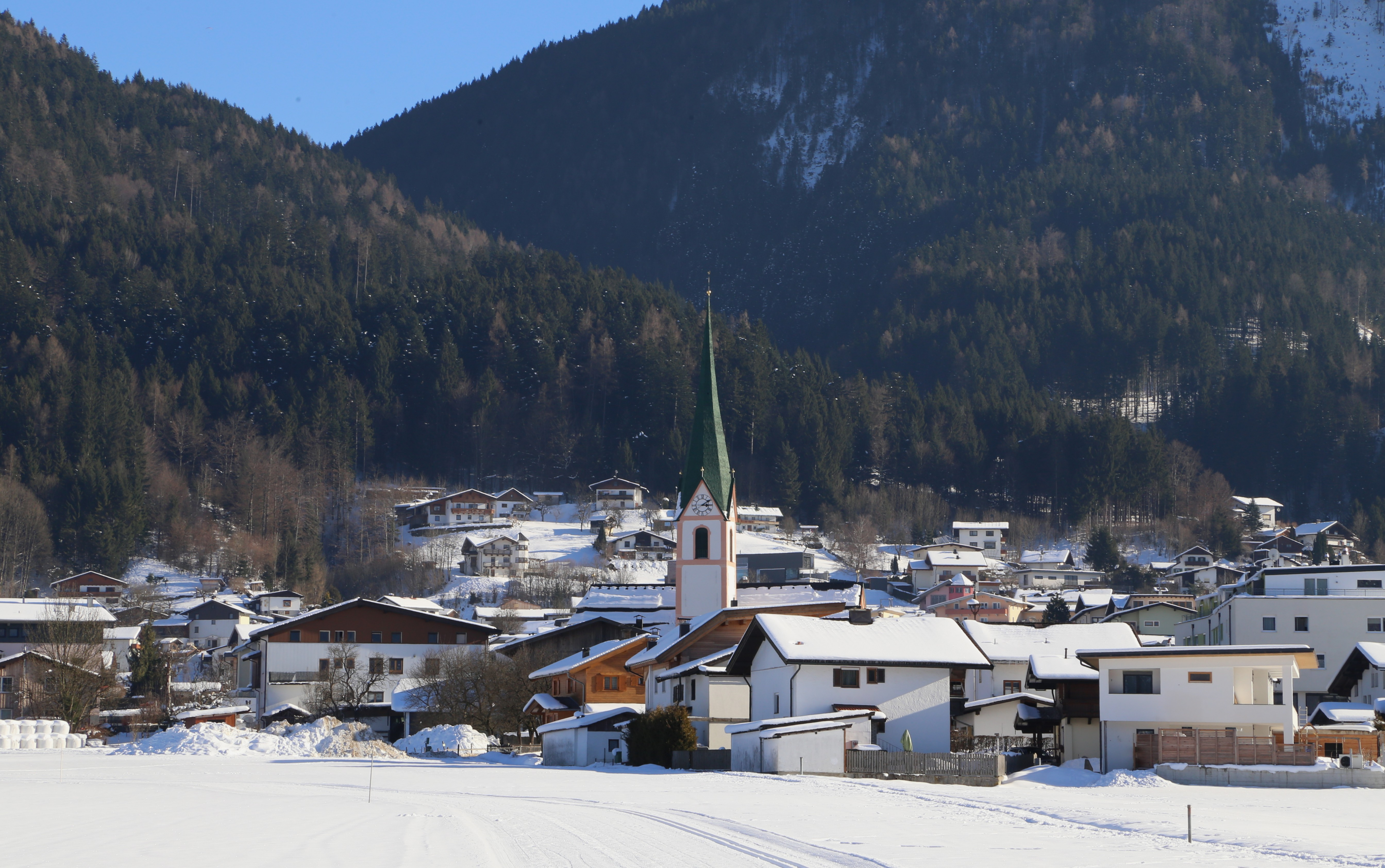
- Bad Häring in winter

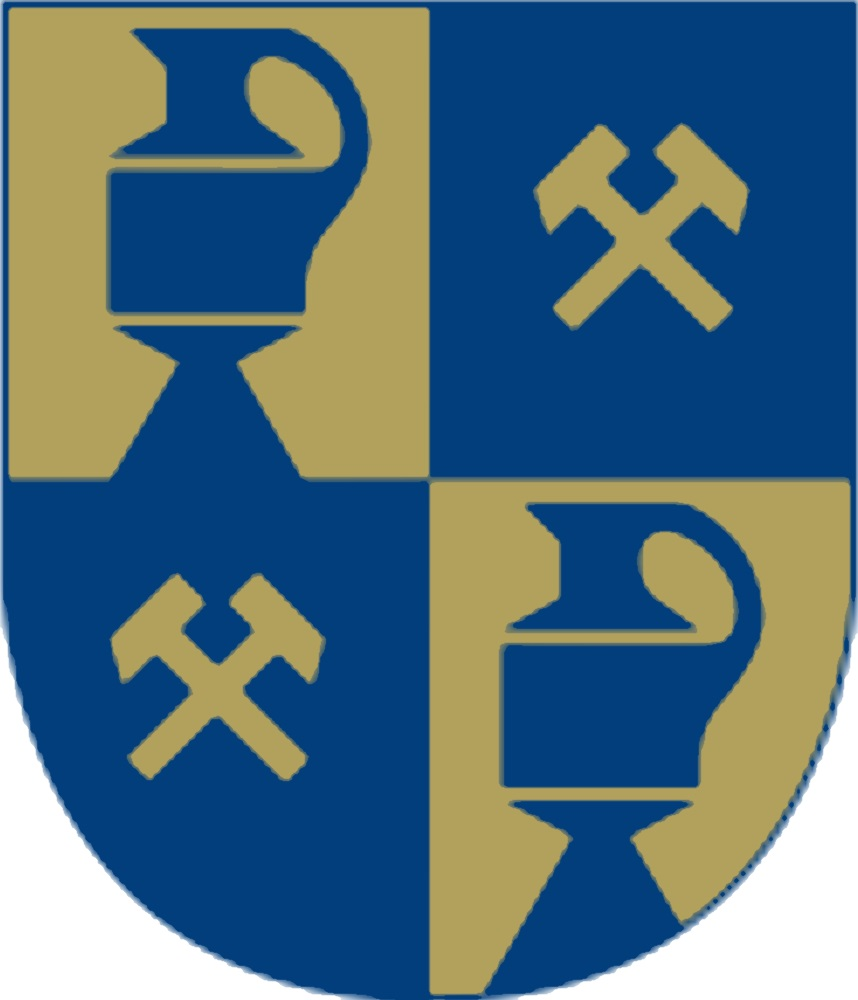
- Coat of arms

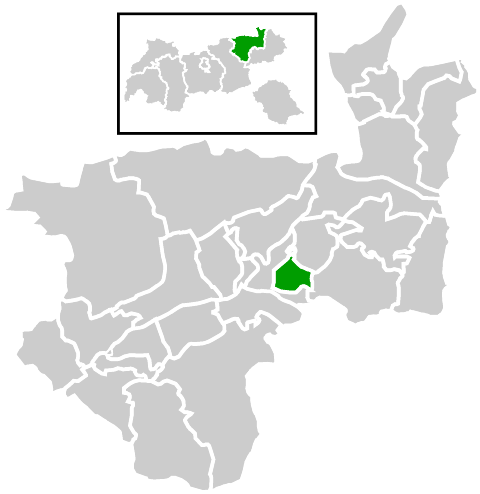
- Location within Kufstein district

- Location within Austria
- Coordinates: 47°30′45″N 12°07′25″E
- Country: Austria
- State: Tyrol
- District: Kufstein

Government
  - Mayor: Hermann Ritzer (SPÖ)

Area
  - Total: 9.27 km^{2} (3.58 sq mi)
- Elevation: 650 m (2,130 ft)

Population (2025)
  - Total: 3,008
  - Density: 324/km^{2} (840/sq mi)
- Time zone: UTC+1 (CET)
  - Summer (DST): UTC+2 (CEST)
- Postal code: 6323
- Area code: 05332
- Vehicle registration: KU
- Website: https://badhaering.at/

Bad Häring (Central Bavarian: Bod Hearing) is a municipality in the Kufstein district in the Austrian state of Tyrol located 4.30 km northwest of Wörgl and 9 km south of Kufstein. A strong sulfur source was found in 1951 resulting in foundation of health tourism. In 1996 the location was named the "first air spa of Tyrol“.

== Population ==
Historical population
Year	Pop.	±%
1869	740	—
1880	1,043	+40.9%
1890	1,080	+3.5%
1900	1,470	+36.1%
1910	1,709	+16.3%
1923	1,772	+3.7%
1934	1,774	+0.1%
1939	1,656	−6.7%
1951	1,814	+9.5%
1961	1,807	−0.4%
1971	1,922	+6.4%
1981	2,065	+7.4%
1991	2,197	+6.4%
2001	2,265	+3.1%
2013	2,562	+13.1%
