= ZhenFund =

China-based venture capital firm

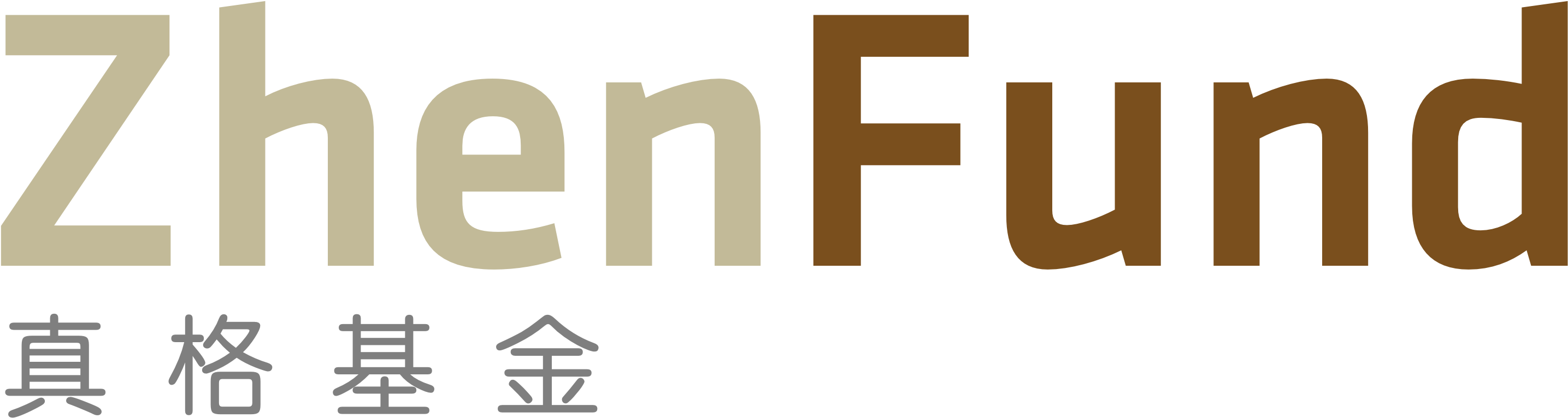
- Native name: 真格基金
- Company type: Private
- Industry: Venture Capital
- Founded: 2011
- Founders: Bob Xiaoping Xu; Victor Qiang Wang; Anna Fang
- Headquarters: Beijing, China
- Key people: Anna Fang (CEO)
- Products: Investments
- Website: zhenfund.com

ZhenFund (Chinese: 真格基金; pinyin: Zhēngé jījīn) is a China-based venture capital firm focused on seed and early-stage investments. It was established in 2011 by New Oriental co-founders Bob (Xiaoping) Xu and Victor (Qiang) Wang. In 2016, Reuters described ZhenFund as China's largest angel investment fund.

== Background ==
In 2011, Bob Xu and Victor Wang established ZhenFund as a firm in collaboration with Sequoia Capital China. Xu and Wang previously co-founded New Oriental, one of the largest education conglomerates in China. Zhenfund was originally a personal investment vehicle for the duo that was set up in 2007. The duo brought in Anna Fang as a founding partner shortly after the firm was launched.

The firm invests in various industry fields such as the internet, technology, artificial intelligence, corporate services, healthcare and education.

== Offices ==
ZhenFund is headquartered in Beijing with additional offices in Shanghai and Shenzhen.

== Notable investments ==
- Blueseed
- EHang
- Jiayuan.com
- LightInTheBox
- Mobvoi
- Momenta
- Niu Technologies
- Ofo
- Ucommune
- Woyingzhichang
- VIPKid
- Xiaohongshu

== See also ==
- Hopu Investment Management
