= Egyptian Federation for Scouts and Girl Guides =

National Scouting and Guiding federation of Egypt

- Headquarters: Cairo
- Country: Egypt
- Membership: 172,000
- President: Abdelmalak Alzainy
- Affiliation: World Association of Girl Guides and Girl Scouts, World Organization of the Scout Movement
- Website http://www.egyptscouts.com/

The Egyptian Federation for Scouts and Girl Guides (EFSGG, Arabic: الاتحاد العام للكشافة والمرشدات Al-Ittiḥād al-`Ām lil-Kaššāfah wal-Muršidāt) is the national Scouting and Guiding federation of Egypt. Scouting was founded in 1914 and was among the charter members of the World Organization of the Scout Movement in 1922, while nominally independent from Britain. Guiding started in 1913 and became a member of the World Association of Girl Guides and Girl Scouts in 1931. The EFSGG served 79,611 Scouts (as of 2011) and 92,000 Guides (as of 2003).

== History ==
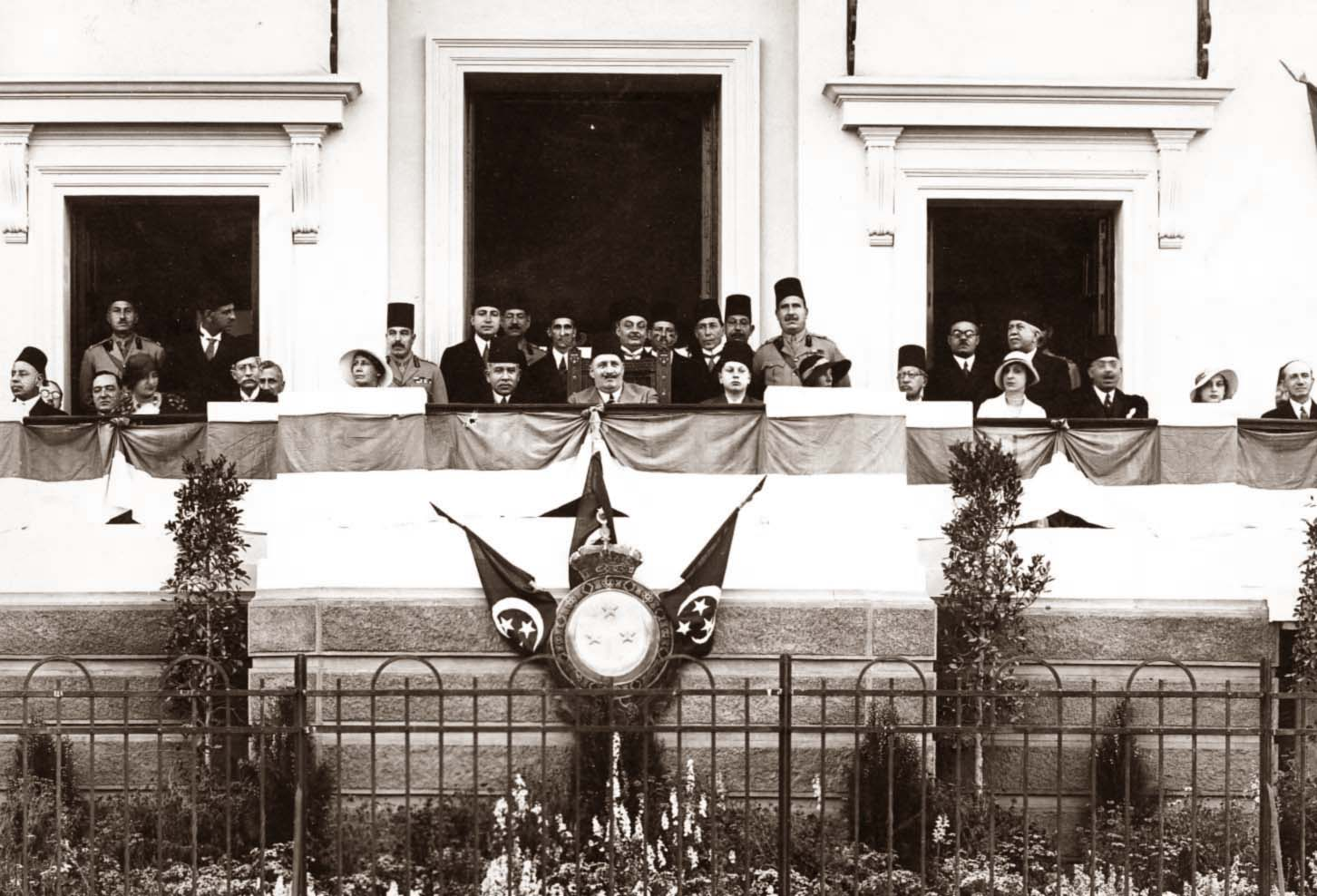
King Fuad I of Egypt and his son Crown Prince Farouk attended a ceremony organized by the Egyptian Federation for Scouts and Girl Guides

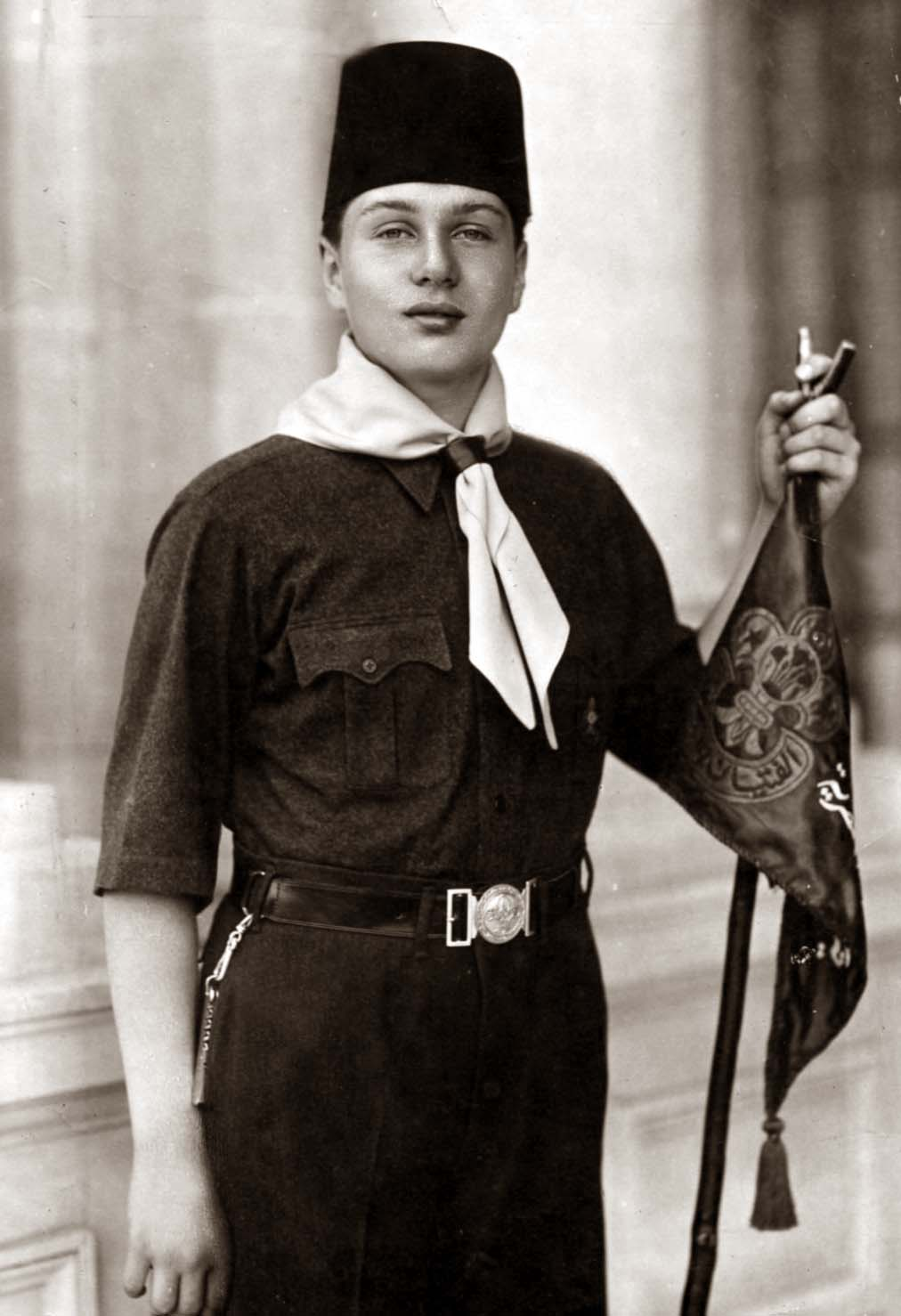
Prince Farouk held the rank of First Scout of Egypt

The first Scout group was founded in Alexandria and brought to Egypt by the British during their occupation.

Mohamed Ali Hafez served on the World Scout Committee of the World Organization of the Scout Movement from 1957 to 1963 and again from 1965 to 1971.

In 1965, Hafez was awarded the Bronze Wolf, the only distinction of the World Organization of the Scout Movement and awarded by the World Scout Committee, for exceptional services to world Scouting. Other recipients include Aziz Osman Bakir in 1971, John M. Lioufis in 1978, and Gamal Khashaba in 1982.

== Structure and program ==
Most Scout troops are associated with schools, clubs, mosques and churches. Rover units are associated with high schools and universities. Egyptian Scouts play an important role in community service. They are involved in desert reclamation, work camps, blood drives, medical care and other projects.

Scouts are offered vocational training and the skills needed to help develop communities. Scouts learn the importance of planting trees where firewood is scarce, building energy efficient stoves and making good use of their carpentry, electricity and plumbing skills.

The EFSGG has four central associations:

- Boy Scouts
- Sea Scouts
- Air Scouts
- Girl Guides - Gamiet Morshidat Gomhoriet Misr al Arabiah

Each of these central associations has corresponding regional associations in the 26 governorates of Egypt; a coordination committee in each governorate organizes the activities and the cooperation between the associations.

- The Girl Guides association has three age divisions:
  - Brownies
  - Girl Guides
  - Rovers

The Cairo International Scout Center is a lavish six-floor building next to Cairo International Stadium that welcomes all Scouts, non-Scout organizations and individual guests. As the home of the Arab Scout Region, it hosts both conference facilities and hostel quarters. In addition, Egypt has a national Scout center, El-Seleen.

The Scout Motto is Kun Musta'idan or كن مستعداً, translating as Be Prepared in Arabic. The noun for a single Scout is Kashaf or كشاف in Arabic.

The Scout emblem incorporates elements of each of the four central associations, as well as a lotus.

== Emblems ==
The Egyptian Boy Scout emblem incorporates the sacred blue lotus

The Scouts Wadi el Nil from the 1930s for Copts and Egyptian Catholic Christians superimposed the national Scout emblem atop an ankh, the ancient Egyptian hieroglyphic character that read "life"

== International Scouting units in Egypt ==
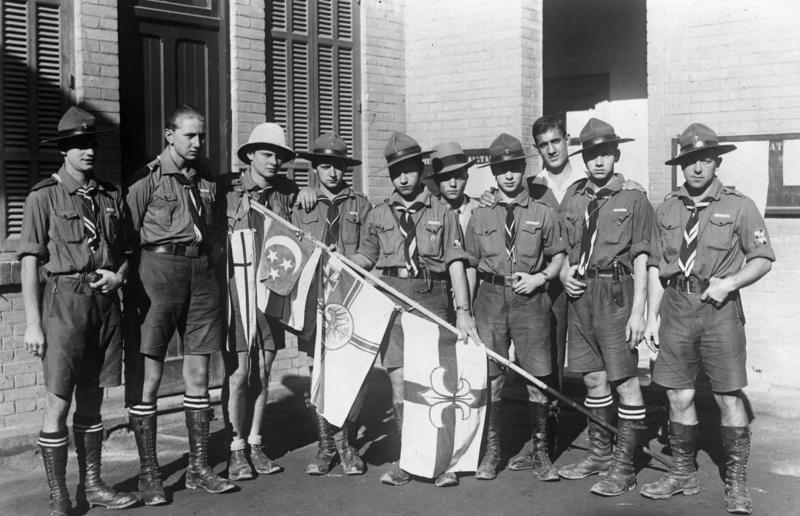
German Kolonialpfadfinder visiting Cairo, 1931

In addition, there are American Boy Scouts in Cairo and Alexandria, linked to the Direct Service branch of the Boy Scouts of America, which supports units around the world. There are also Greek Scouts of the Soma Hellinon Proskopon in Alexandria.
