= Arab Region =

Arab Region may refer to:

- Arab Scout Region (World Organization of the Scout Movement)
- Arab Region (World Association of Girl Guides and Girl Scouts)
- Sunni Region, sometimes referred to as the Arab Region by some advocates.
- Arab world
