= Arab Scout Jamboree =

International Arab Scouts Camp

Arab Scout Jamborees are region-wide events run or sponsored by member countries of the Arab Scout Region of the World Organization of the Scout Movement. During the 1953 14th World Scout Conference in Liechtenstein, Syria offered to host the 8th World Scout Jamboree, but was denied after Israel protested that Israeli Scouts couldn't enter Arab countries. The Arab delegations felt that they wouldn't be able to host such international events and decided to organize on the Pan-Arab level. They prepared a draft in March 1954 that was approved by the Arab League Council on its 21st session, establishing the Arab Scout Organization. The first Arab Scout Conference (and Jamboree) was held at Zabadani, Syria in the summer of 1954, where the Arab Scout Committee was formed.

The second conference and jamboree were held at Abu Qir, Egypt in the summer of 1956.

== List of Arab Scout Jamborees ==
Event	Location	Country	Date
1st Arab Jamboree	Zabadani	Syria	1954
2nd Arab Jamboree	Alexandria-Aboukir	Egypt	1956
3rd Arab Jamboree-(III Pan-Arab Scout Jamboree)	Damascus	Syria	1958
4th Arab Jamboree	Sousse	Tunisia	1960
5th Arab Jamboree	Maamoura	Morocco	1962
6th Arab Jamboree	Aboukir	Egypt	1964
7th Arab Jamboree-(7th Pan-Arab Scout Jamboree and 1st Arab Girl Scout Camp)	Joudaim	Libya	1966
8th Arab Jamboree	Sidi Fredj	Algeria	1968
9th Arab Jamboree	Zabadani	Syria	1970
10th Arab Jamboree	Mussal	Iraq	1972
11th Arab Jamboree	Byblos	Lebanon	1974
12th Arab Jamboree	Borj Cédria	Tunisia	1976
13th Arab Jamboree	Maamoura	Morocco	1978
14th Arab Jamboree	Joudaim	Libya	1980
15th Arab Jamboree	Joudaim	Libya	1982
16th Arab Jamboree	Sidi Fredj	Algeria	1984
17th Arab Jamboree	Salalah	Oman	1986
18th Arab Jamboree	Maamoura	Morocco	1988
19th Arab Jamboree	Joudaim	Libya	1990
20th Arab Jamboree	Cairo	Egypt	1992
21st Arab Jamboree	Port Said	Egypt	1994
22nd Arab Jamboree	Borj Cédria	Tunisia	1996
23rd Arab Jamboree	Byblos	Lebanon	1998
24th Arab Jamboree	Ta’if	Saudi Arabia	2000
25th Arab Jamboree	Amman	Jordan	2002
26th Arab Jamboree-	Joudaim	Libya	2004
27th Arab Jamboree-	London	United Kingdom	2007
28th Arab Jamboree	Borj Cédria	Tunisia	2008
29th Arab Jamboree	Cairo	Egypt	2010
30th Arab Jamboree	Alexandria+Aboukir	Egypt	2012
31st Arab Jamboree	Amman	Jordan	2015
32nd Arab Jamboree	Algiers + Blida+Tipaza	Algeria	2018
33rd Arab Jamboree	Dubai	United Arab Emirates	2023

== Girl Guides sub-camp ==
The Girl Guides have been a significant part of the Arab Scout Jamboree for many years. The first Arab Girl Scout Camp was held during the 7th Arab Jamboree in Joudaim, Libya in 1966. Since then, the Girl Guides have been an integral part of the event, with their sub-camp being a place for fostering friendship, exchanging experiences, developing national spirit, promoting the Scouting movement, developing leadership skills, and facilitating cultural exchange.

In 1974, the Eleventh Arab Scout Jamboree and Fifth Arab Girl Guide jamboree was held in Lebanon. The Girl Guides camped near the 18th-century Lebanese town Deir al-Qamar, and the event lasted eight days for the Girl Guides. The jamboree included traditional Scouting activities, national flag ceremonies, marching contests, bonfires, sports, handicraft classes, and displays.

In 1995, the Girl Guides Movement was established in the State of Qatar, and in 1996, the Girl Guides Movement in Qatar joined the Arab Girl Guides Association in the 14th Arab Conference, which was held in the Kingdom of Bahrain.

The Girl Guides Association of the United Arab Emirates, founded in 1973, became a full member of the World Association of Girl Guides and Girl Scouts in 1984. They have been participating in the Arab Scout Jamboree, organizing the Girl Guides sub-camp within this event.
