= Khashaba =

Khashaba is a surname and name. Notable people with the surname include:

- Khashaba Dadasaheb Jadhav (1925–1984), Indian Wrestler
- Gamal Khashaba, Egyptian scouting administrator
- Hady Khashaba (born 1972), Egyptian footballer
