= Nymphaea nouchali var. nouchali =

Scientific classification
- Kingdom: Plantae
- Clade: Embryophytes
- Clade: Tracheophytes
- Clade: Spermatophytes
- Clade: Angiosperms
- Order: Nymphaeales
- Family: Nymphaeaceae
- Genus: Nymphaea
- Species: N. nouchali
- Variety: N. n. var. nouchali

Trinomial name
- Nymphaea nouchali var. nouchali (Autonym)

Synonyms
- List: Castalia acutiloba (DC.) Hand.-Mazz.; Castalia stellaris Salisb.; Castalia stellata (Willd.) Blume; Leuconymphaea stellata (Willd.) Kuntze; Nymphaea acutiloba DC.; Nymphaea cahlara Donn; Nymphaea cyanea Roxb. ex G.Don; Nymphaea henkeliana Rehnelt; Nymphaea hookeriana Lehm.; Nymphaea membranacea Wall. ex Casp.; Nymphaea nouchali var. cyanea (Roxb. ex G.Don) M.R.Almeida; Nymphaea punctata Edgew.; Nymphaea rhodantha Lehm.; Nymphaea stellata Willd.; Nymphaea stellata var. albiflora Lovassy; Nymphaea stellata var. cyanea (Roxb. ex G.Don) Hook.f. & Thomson; Nymphaea stellata var. parviflora Hook.f. & Thomson; Nymphaea sumatrana Miq.; Nymphaea voalefoka Lat.-Marl.

Species of aquatic plant

Nymphaea nouchali var. nouchali is a variety of the water lily species Nymphaea nouchali in the family Nymphaeaceae native to the region spanning from tropical and subtropical Asia to north Australia.

== Description ==
=== Vegetative characteristics ===
Nymphaea nouchali var. nouchali is a perennial, rhizomatous, aquatic herb. The upper leaf surface is bright green with purple spotting. The lower leaf surface is purple. The petiole is light green.

=== Generative characteristics ===
The blue, 4.5–9.6 cm wide flower has 8–24 blue, 2.4–7.8 cm long, and 0.3–3 cm wide petals with an acute apex. The gynoecium consists of 6–25 carpels.

== Taxonomy ==
It is an autonym, which was generated through the description of Nymphaea nouchali var. caerulea (Savigny) Verdc.

== Ecology ==
It occurs in coastal wetlands, marshes, and lakes.

== Distribution ==
It is native to Afghanistan, Australia, Bangladesh, Cambodia, China, India, Indonesia, Laos, Malaysia, Myanmar, New Guinea, Pakistan, Philippines, Sri Lanka, Taiwan, Thailand, and Vietnam.

== Conservation ==
In Sri Lanka, it is a vulnerable species.

== Use ==
It is the national flower of Sri Lanka. It is used as food.
