= Scouting in Somalia =

Scouting movement in Somalia

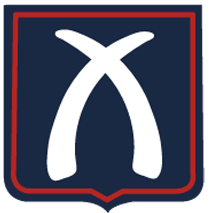
Italian Somali Scout badge

Somalia is one of 29 countries where Scouting exists but there is no National Scout Organization which is a member of the World Organization of the Scout Movement at the present time, and no organization was ever recognized by WOSM during the nation's periods of Scouting history.

Scouting existed in both British Somaliland and Italian Somaliland. Scouts in Somaliland of the late 1950s used British badges, being a branch of the UK Boy Scout Association. Somalia was represented at the 1967 World Jamboree.

Boy Scouts of Somaliland

Scouting in Somalia appears to have existed until the 1990s, but due to the unrest in the country, no information on the situation on national level is currently available. In February 2007, UNICEF sources reported the existence of a local Scout group, Boy Scouts of Somaliland, in Ceerigaabo, Somaliland.

alternate badge

Though geographically part of the Africa Scout Region, even shown thus on the Region's emblem, Somali Scouts are apparently participating in Arab Scout Region events on some occasions.

Somalia and Somaliland issued postage stamps with Scouting motifs in 1999 and 2003, but it is not clear if they are connected to a specific organization.

The Scout Motto in Somalia is Is diyaari, which means "Be Prepared" in the Somali language.
