= National Scout Association of Eritrea =

National Scouting organization of Eritrea

- Country: Eritrea
- Founded: (1950)

The National Scout Association of Eritrea is the national Scouting organization of Eritrea. Scouting in Eritrea shares a common history with that of Ethiopia, where Scouting was founded in 1950. Scouting in Eritrea has become active again after many years of government banning, and is in its infancy. Political unrest and financial considerations have slowed growth. Scouts have not been seen at regional Scout events and may just operate on a local level.

== Background ==
The creation and operation of Eritrean Scout groups is supported by the Italian Scouting organization Associazione Guide e Scouts Cattolici Italiani.

Eritrea is one of 29 countries where Scouting exists but is not yet a member of the World Organization of the Scout Movement, and no organization was ever recognized by WOSM during the nation's Scouting history.

The membership badge of the National Scout Association of Eritrea incorporates the flag of Eritrea.
