= Nymphaea nouchali var. ovalifolia =

Scientific classification
- Kingdom: Plantae
- Clade: Embryophytes
- Clade: Tracheophytes
- Clade: Spermatophytes
- Clade: Angiosperms
- Order: Nymphaeales
- Family: Nymphaeaceae
- Genus: Nymphaea
- Subgenus: Nymphaea subg. Brachyceras
- Species: N. nouchali
- Variety: N. n. var. ovalifolia

Trinomial name
- Nymphaea nouchali var. ovalifolia (Conard) Verdc.

Synonyms
- Nymphaea ovalifolia Conard; Nymphaea vernayi Bremek. & Oberm.

Species of aquatic plant

Nymphaea nouchali var. ovalifolia is a variety of the water lily species Nymphaea nouchali Burm.f. native to the region spanning from West Tanzania to South Africa.

== Description ==
=== Vegetative characteristics ===
Nymphaea nouchali var. ovalifolia is an annual or perennial, aquatic herb with narrowly elliptic, 25 cm long, and 14.7 cm wide leaves. The adaxial leaf surface displays irregular brown patterns, and the abaxial leaf surface is plain green.

=== Generative characteristics ===
The deep blue flowers have acuminate sepals and petals. The sepals are 4 cm long, and 1.3 cm wide.

== Taxonomy ==
=== Publication ===
It was first described by Henry Shoemaker Conard as Nymphaea ovalifolia Conard in 1905. Later, it was included in the species Nymphaea nouchali Burm.f. as the variety Nymphaea nouchali var. ovalifolia (Conard) Verdc. published by Bernard Verdcourt in 1989.

== Etymology ==
The varietal name ovalifolia, from the Latin ovali- meaning oval and -folia meaning leaf, means "oval leaved".

== Ecology ==
=== Role as host plant ===
Nymphaea nouchali var. ovalifolia is a host plant of the beetle species Donaciasta goeckei.
