= Nymphaea nouchali var. versicolor =

Scientific classification
- Kingdom: Plantae
- Clade: Embryophytes
- Clade: Tracheophytes
- Clade: Spermatophytes
- Clade: Angiosperms
- Order: Nymphaeales
- Family: Nymphaeaceae
- Genus: Nymphaea
- Subgenus: Nymphaea subg. Brachyceras
- Species: N. nouchali
- Variety: N. n. var. versicolor

Trinomial name
- Nymphaea nouchali var. versicolor (Sims) Guruge & Yakand.

Synonyms
- Castalia versicolor (Sims) Tratt.; Nymphaea stellata var. versicolor (Sims) Hook.f. & Thomson; Nymphaea versicolor Sims; Nymphaea malabarica Poir.

Species of aquatic plant

Nymphaea nouchali var. versicolor is a variety of the water lily species Nymphaea nouchali Burm.f. naturally found in tropical Asia.

== Description ==
=== Vegetative characteristics ===
Nymphaea nouchali var. versicolor is an aquatic, perennial herb.

=== Generative characteristics ===
The flowers are diurnal. The seeds are ellipsoid-globose.

== Taxonomy ==
=== Publication ===
It was described as Nymphaea versicolor Sims by John Sims (1749-1831) in 1809. Later, it was included in the species Nymphaea nouchali Burm.f. as the variety Nymphaea nouchali var. versicolor (Sims) Guruge & Yakand. by Shashika Kumudumali Guruge and Deepthi Yakandawala in 2017.
Its synonym Nymphaea malabarica Poir. was published even earlier by Jean Louis Marie Poiret in 1798.

== Etymology ==
The varietal name versicolor, from the Latin verso meaning to keep turning and colorem meaning colour, means "variously coloured" or "changing colour".

== Ecology ==
=== Habitat ===
It occurs in rice fields, swamps, marshes, and ponds.
