= Scouting in Equatorial Guinea =

Scouting movement in Equatorial Guinea

Equatorial Guinea is one of 29 countries where Scouting exists but there is no National Scout Organization which is a member of the World Organization of the Scout Movement (WOSM) at the present time. Scouting in Equatorial Guinea is apparently working toward WOSM recognition. The Africa Scout Region conducted a fact-finding mission on the status of Scouting in November 2003.

Equatorial Guinea has issued postage stamps with Scouting motifs, but it is not clear if they are connected to a specific organization.

The Scout Motto is Siempre Listo (Always Ready) in Spanish.
