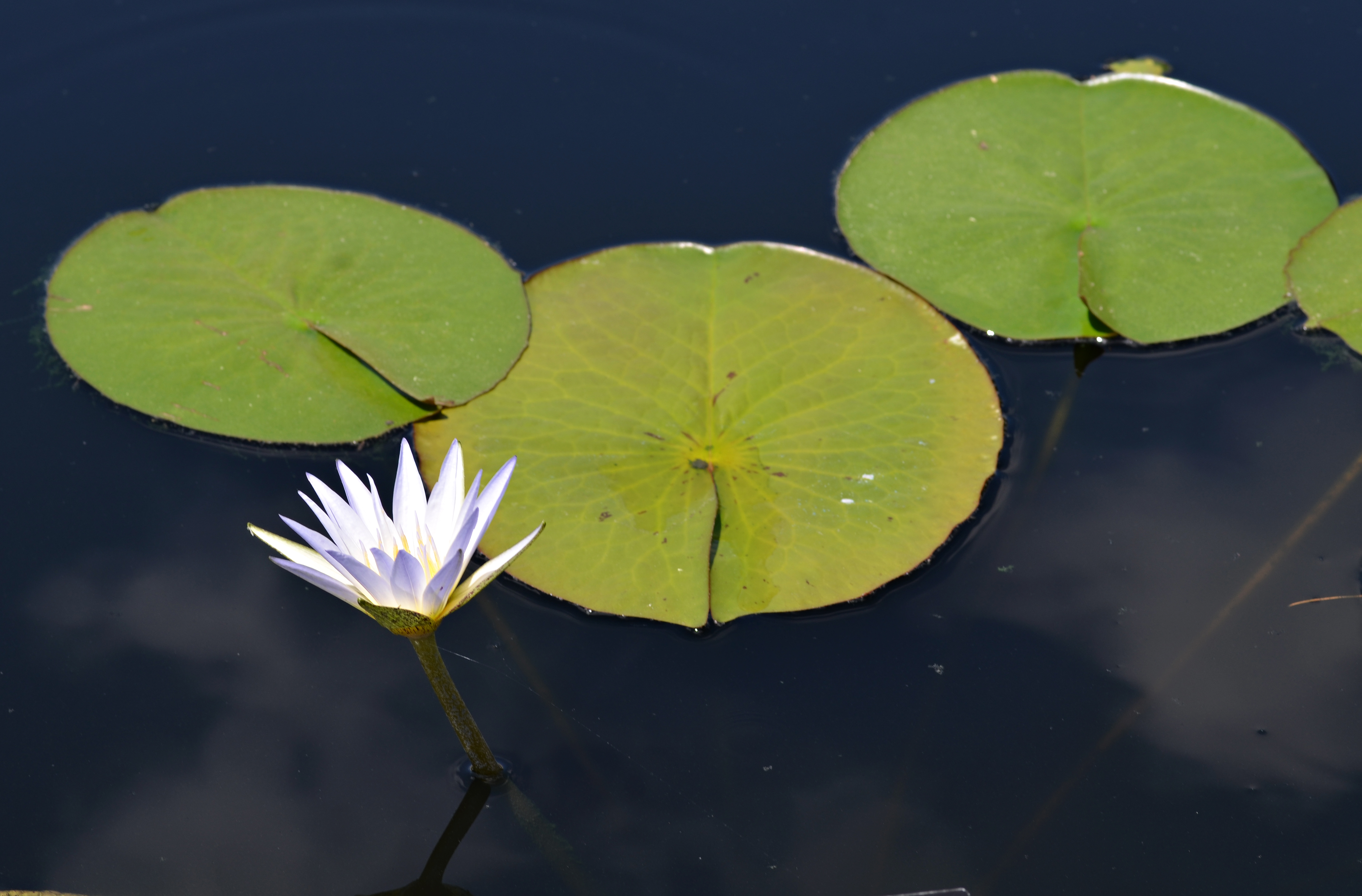
- A Nymphaea nouchali var. caerulea flower

Scientific classification
- Kingdom: Plantae
- Clade: Tracheophytes
- Clade: Angiosperms
- Order: Nymphaeales
- Family: Nymphaeaceae
- Genus: Nymphaea
- Subgenus: Nymphaea subg. Brachyceras
- Species: N. nouchali
- Variety: N. n. var. caerulea

Trinomial name
- Nymphaea nouchali var. caerulea (Savigny) Verdc., 1989

Synonyms
- List: Castalia caerulea (Savigny) Tratt., 1822; Castalia capensis (Thunb.) J.Schust., 1907; Castalia scutifolia Salisb., 1805; Leuconymphaea berneriana (Planch.) Kuntze, 1891; Leuconymphaea caerulea (Savigny) Kuntze, 1891; Leuconymphaea emirnensis (Planch.) Kuntze, 1891; Nymphaea bernieriana Planch., 1853; Nymphaea caerulea Savigny, 1798; Nymphaea calliantha Conard, 1904; Nymphaea capensis Thunb., 1800; Nymphaea capensis var. alba K.C.Landon, 1984; Nymphaea coerulea Andrews, 1801; Nymphaea cyclophylla R.E.Fr., 1914; Nymphaea edgeworthii Lehm., 1852; Nymphaea emirnensis Planch., 1853; Nymphaea engleri Gilg, 1908; Nymphaea madagascariensis DC., 1821; Nymphaea magnifica Gilg, 1908; Nymphaea mildbraedii Gilg, 1908; Nymphaea muschleriana Gilg, 1908; Nymphaea nubica Lehm., 1853; Nymphaea radiata Bercht. & Opiz, 1825; Nymphaea scutifolia (Salisb.) DC., 1821; Nymphaea spectabilis Gilg, 1908; Nymphaea sphaerantha Peter, 1928

= Nymphaea nouchali var. caerulea =

Species of plant

Nymphaea nouchali var. caerulea, or simply Nymphaea caerulea, also known as blue lotus or blue water lily among many other names, (Note: Also known as Nymphaea caerulea, and known in English as Egyptian lotus, blue lotus, blue water lily (RSA), Cape water lily (RSA), frog's pulpit (RSA), blue lotus of the Nile, blue waterlily, blue Egyptian lotus, blue Egyptian water lily (India), sacred blue lily of the Nile (India), Utpala (India), Cape blue waterlily (USA) and sacred blue lily,) is a water lily in the genus Nymphaea, a botanical variety of Nymphaea nouchali.

It is an aquatic plant of freshwater lakes, pools and rivers, naturally found throughout most of the eastern half of Africa, as well as parts of southern Arabia, but has also been spread to other regions as an ornamental plant. It can tolerate the roots being in anoxic mud in nutritionally poor conditions, and can become a dominant plant in deeper water in such habitats. The underwater rhizomes are edible.

It features prominently in Egyptian mythology and art, symbolizing the sun and rebirth and has been found in pharaohs' tombs. It may have been used for aphrodisiac and religious purposes, including in rituals like Hathor's Festival of Drunkenness. The plant contains the psychoactive alkaloids nuciferine and apomorphine, which interact with the serotonin, dopamine, and adrenergic systems. Modern recreational use, primarily through drinking infusions or vaping, has been associated with toxicity, causing symptoms like sedation and perceptual disturbances. Recent research by UC Berkeley confirmed that the authentic Nymphaea caerulea is chemically distinct from many products sold online, which contain significantly less of the alkaloid nuciferine and are misidentified water lilies.

Nymphaea caerulea, first described by Marie Jules César Savigny in 1798, was later classified as a variety of Nymphaea nouchali by Bernard Verdcourt in 1989. Though it is still most commonly referred to as a variety of Nymphaea nouchali, recent phylogenetic studies have problematized the taxonomy. When defined taxonomically as Nymphaea nouchali var. caerulea, it is considered synonymous with Nymphaea capensis. When considered taxonomically as Nymphaea caerulea, it is now rare due to habitat loss from the Aswan Dam.

== Description ==
=== Vegetative characteristics ===
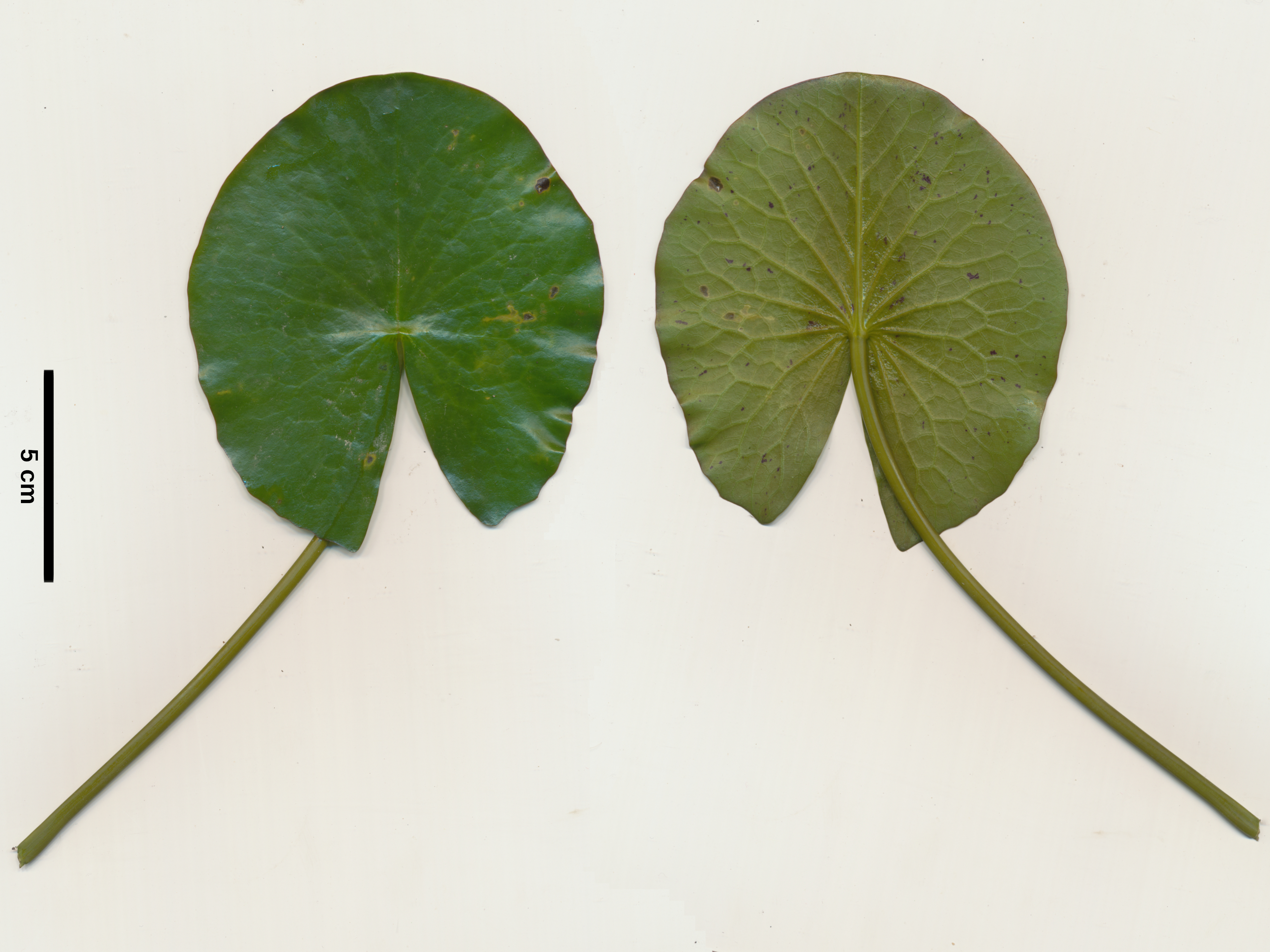
Nymphaea nouchali var. caerulea (Savigny) Verdc. floating leaf with scale bar (5 cm) on a white background

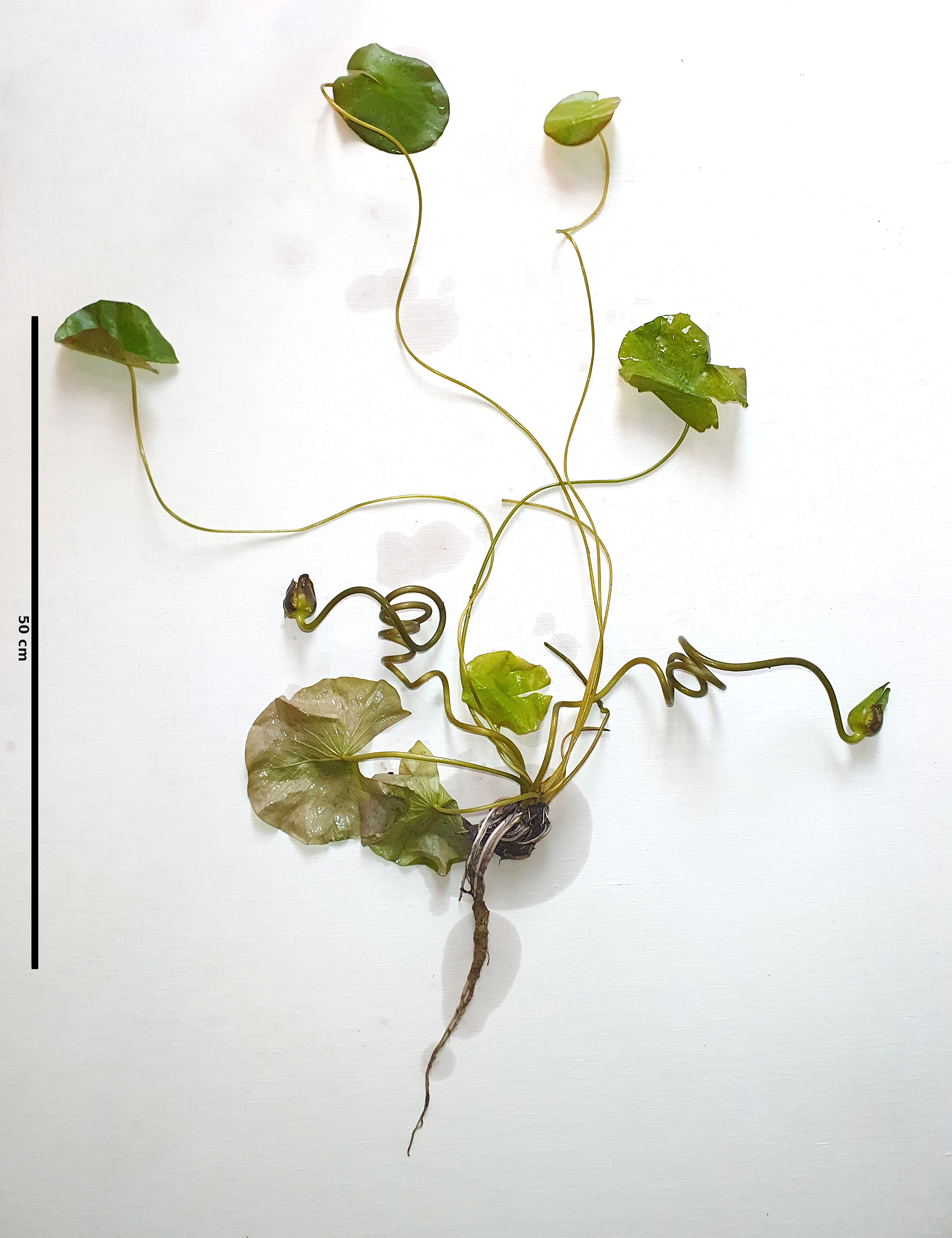
Complete specimen of Nymphaea nouchali var. caerulea (Savigny) Verdc. with scale bar (50 cm) on a white background

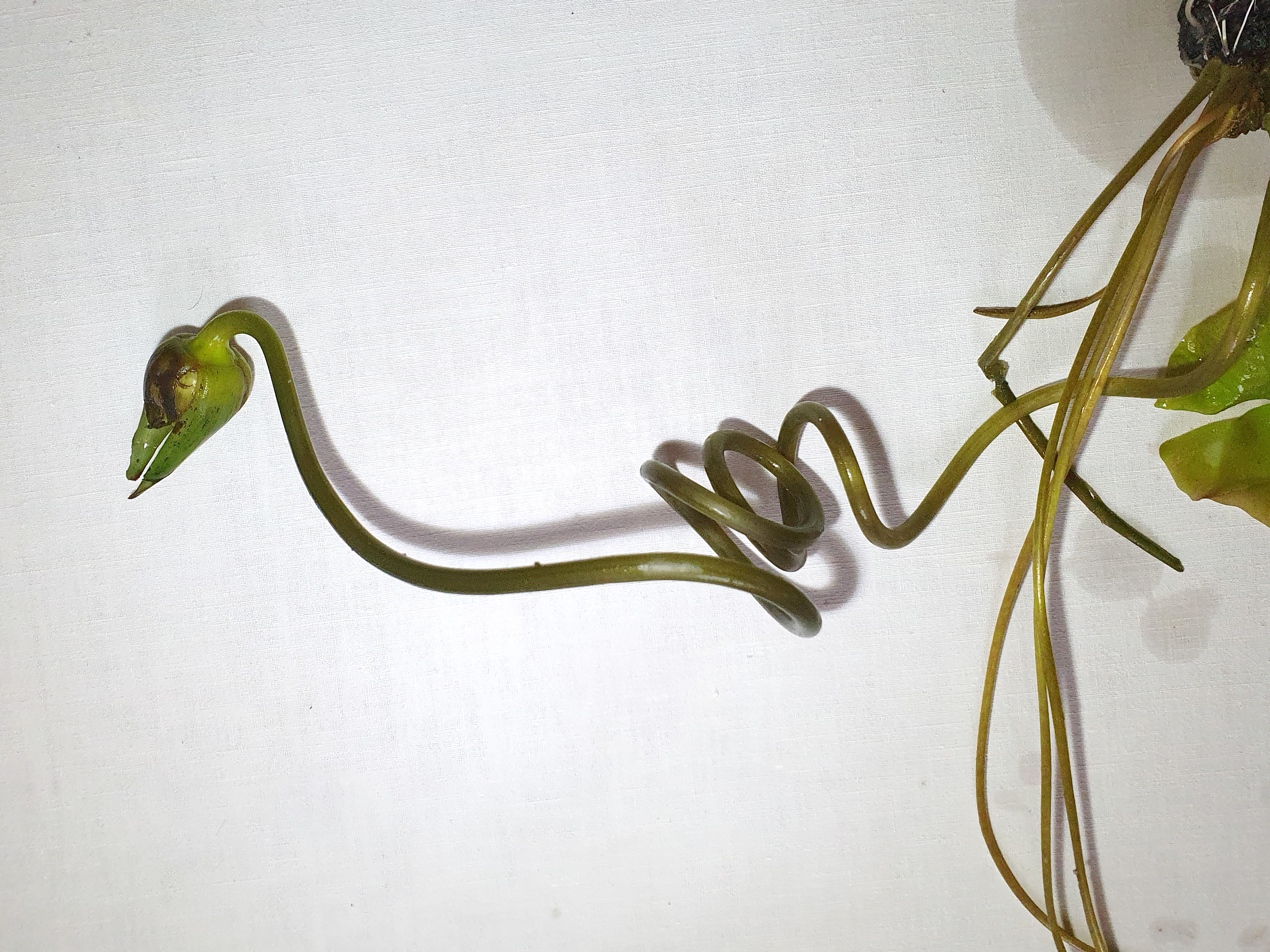
Nymphaea nouchali var. caerulea (Savigny) Verdc. fruit with coiled peduncle on a white background

This is an aquatic (euhydrophyte) herb with a tuberous rhizome. That is to say, it has small tubers that may develop into short vertical rhizomes. It is a perennial. One plant can spread over an area of about 1 metre.

The peltate leaves have long petioles and have leaf blades (lamina) which are 8–35 cm (3–14 in) by 7.5–42 cm (3–17 in) in size. The leaves are polymorphic, changing in form and texture depending if they are underwater or floating. These laminae have a chartaceous texture and can be glabrous or densely covered in pubescent hairs. The shape is incised-cordate and orbicular or subelliptic, with an acute or caudate apex. The two lobes can overlap somewhat or be slightly apart from each other. The upper surface of the lamina is smooth, but the underside has conspicuously raised, green or rarely reddish or reddish-purple veins. There are eight to eleven primary lateral veins on each side of the midrib. There are six to eight pairs of secondary veins arising from the midrib. The primary veins form a pattern of closed, elongated areas stretching to more than two thirds of the way to the margin of the leaf. The leaf margin is entire towards the apex or more-or-less irregularly sinuate-lobulate throughout its entirety. The petioles are thick, blackish green and spongy. They continue to lengthen as they age, pushing older leaves towards the margins of the plant.

=== Generative characteristics ===
The flowers can be blue, white, mauve or pinkish in colour, but usually have pale bluish-white to sky-blue or mauve petals, smoothly changing to a pale yellow in the centre of the flower, and are 8–12 cm (3–5 in) in diameter. There are four sepals; these are coloured green and sometimes purple at the margins, and are 4–10 cm (2–4 in) by 1.5–3.5 cm (1–1 in) in size. There are 14–20 petals, of which the outermost are as long as the sepals. Their shape is oblong, and their apexes end in blunt or subacute tips. The stamens are densely congested and very numerous, numbering 100–200 or more. The outermost stamens have long appendages. There are 14–24 carpels, with a very short style. There are also carpellary appendages; these are what is known as 'osmophores', structures which serve to attract pollinators without actually rewarding them, thus by deceit. In this case they are visually attractive for bees and exude an odour mimicking food.

The flower buds rise to the surface over a period of two to three days, and when ready, open during the mid-morning, closing near dusk. This ability is controlled by the sepals; when these are cut off, the flower loses the ability to close. The flowers and buds do not rise above the water in the morning, nor do they submerge at night. The flowers last some four days before they start to wither, closing up each night.

The fruit are berries, 2.2 by 3.2 cm and flattened-round in shape. The seeds are ellipsoid and 1.2 mm long. They are smooth, and have a fleshy, bell-shaped aril.

=== Chemical composition ===
The plant's psychoactive properties are primarily attributed to the aporphine alkaloids nuciferine and apomorphine:

- Nuciferine has a more complex receptor binding profile, acting as an antagonist at the serotonin 5-HT_{2A} receptor, a partial agonist at the dopamine D_{2} and D_{5} receptors and serotonin 5-HT_{6} receptor receptor, and an inhibitor of the dopamine transporter or dopamine reuptake inhibitor. Its degradation product, atherosperminine, is also associated with dopamine receptor agonism.
- Apomorphine acts as a non-selective dopamine receptor agonist and serotonin receptor modulator, with partial agonist activity at the serotonin 5-HT_{1A} receptor and antagonist activity at the serotonin 5-HT_{2A} receptor. It's also an α-adrenergic receptor antagonist or alpha blocker. The drug's potential use in treating erectile dysfunction may explain the plant's historical reputation as an aphrodisiac;

Analyses of commercial products show inconsistent alkaloid content. A study found nuciferine in all tested "blue lotus" products, but apomorphine in only a few.

Nymphaea caerulea contains the psychoactive alkaloid nuciferine, which contributes to its euphoric effects. Chemical analyses using mass spectrometry have shown that authentic flowers have significantly higher concentrations of nuciferine compared to other water lilies.

Historically, research into the plant's chemistry produced different findings. In the 1970s and 1980s William Emboden suggested that Nymphaea caerulea contained aporphine alkaloids (though photochemical studies were not performed); however at the time aporphine alkaloids were not found in the photochemical studies performed, and the chemical composition of Nymphaea caerulea was discovered to include compounds such as 7-hydroxyflavone, 4,7-dihydroxyaurone, and 4'-hydroxyaurone, along with methyl vanillate and cinnamyl alcohol.

== Cytology ==
The chromosome count is n = 14. The genome size is 567.24 Mb.

== Taxonomy ==
Nymphaea spectabilis, a purple form known from cultivation, and N. capensis, found throughout eastern, central and southern Africa, as well as a number of other named taxa, were synonymised to N. nouchali var. caerulea in the 1989 addition to the Flora of Tropical East Africa (FTEA) series, a position which has generally been accepted, although some of the authorities in Bangladesh and in the United States disagree.

In 2012 there was a phylogenetic study where N. caerulea was more related to N. gracilis, an endemic of northern Mexico, than it was to N. nouchali. The evolutionary tree was a consensus of ITS2 and matk. According to this study, N. caerulea should not be considered as a variety of N. nouchali. When genomes from the water lily genus (Nymphaea) were published in the journal Nature in 2020, N. caerulea was cited under that name, not as N. nouchali var. caerulea. Another phylogenetic study from 2021 found N. caerulea (as N. capensis) to be closest related to N. colorata, an east African species.

Nymphaea nouchali is itself a taxonomically challenging species, with a distribution that spans Australia, throughout southern Asia, across Africa to the Western Cape. It has many colour forms (with red-coloured forms generally called N. stellata) and has a long history of cultivation. In Africa, following the 1989 FTEA publication, five different varieties are recognised: var. caerulea, the most widespread, ovalifolia, in parts of tropical Southern Africa, petersiana, the same, zanzibarensis, from tropical southern, central and East Africa, and mutandaensis, which is an endemic of Uganda. One of these taxa, var. petersiana, was found to be quite divergent in the 2012 study. If the 2012 study is to be accepted, this may indicate that the African populations of N. nouchali belong to another species than the Asian and Australian type populations, and should likely be renamed N. caerulea as this name has priority over N. capensis.

=== Publication ===
It was first described as Nymphaea caerulea Savigny by Marie Jules César Savigny in 1798. Later, it was included in the species Nymphaea nouchali Burm.f. as the variety Nymphaea nouchali var. caerulea (Savigny) Verdc. published by Bernard Verdcourt in 1989.

=== Classification ===
It is classified in the Nymphaea subgenus Brachyceras. This subgenus appears to be phylogenetically sound.

== Distribution ==
The native distribution covers North Africa along the Nile and south throughout central, East and Southern Africa. It is common in this range. The conservation status has not been evaluated by the IUCN, but it is considered a species of 'least concern' by the South African National Biodiversity Institute in their Red List of South African Plants.

On the African continent, it occurs, from north to south, westwards to at least Chad, Congo-Brazzaville, the DRC (only in Katanga?), Angola and Namibia. In South Africa this plant is found in every province, as well as in eSwatini, but it is not native to Lesotho and the Western Cape. It also occurs on islands off the eastern African coast: Zanzibar, Madagascar and the Comoro Islands. It is native to Yemen and Oman (in Dhofar) in the southern Arabian Peninsula but, according to Moshe Agami in a 1980 paper, is thought to have become extinct in the wild in Israel.

It has more recently been spread more widely around the world as an ornamental plant, and introduced populations are now found in Bangladesh, Meghalaya, Kerala and Assam in India, Fiji, Mauritius, North Island in New Zealand, New South Wales and Queensland in Australia, Cook Islands, Costa Rica, and throughout eastern South America (in Brazil and Argentina).

There is an introduced population of blue water-lilies originally from East Africa in the US in the state of Florida. This was first identified as N. zanzibarensis, then as N. capensis var. zanzibarensis, but following the 1989 FTEA publication the taxon was moved to N. nouchali var. zanzibarensis. Nonetheless the 1997 addition to the Flora of North America series decided to retain recognition of the local population under the name N. capensis, and this population continues to be recognised under that name in the US.

The naturalised populations in eastern Australia were also thought to be N. capensis var. zanzibarensis, then later N. caerulea var. zanzibarensis, then in 2011 N. capensis, but the plants in the wild are now thought to be N. caerulea. It is considered an environmental weed in Australia.

== Ecology ==
It has a habitat consisting of rivers, lakes and pools. As of 1921, it has been found at elevations of 10–1,650 m (33–5,413 ft) in South Africa.

Although in cultivation it is said to be quite demanding of nutrients, in the quite nutrient-poor Lake Nabugabo in Uganda it is the dominant aquatic plant species, only being replaced by N. lotus in the eastern tip of the lake, and other aquatic genera where it is more shallow. The dense monospecific stands are associated with an Utricularia sp. and Nymphoides indica in one part of the lake, and with Ceratophyllum demersum in certain other bays. The waterlily stands in this lake are especially poor in invertebrate biodiversity, which may reflect the low levels of dissolved oxygen near the sediments in this habitat. In Lake Bisina, Uganda, N. caerulea is most clearly associated with Utricularia reflexa; this may be due to similar ecological niches, it may just mean the small, rootless, free-moving Utricularia simply get snagged on the petioles, but it may indicate some sort of a commensal relationship, with U. reflexa being shaded by the leaves of N. caerulea. Hydrilla verticillata is another plant which seems to sometimes occur together with the waterlily in this lake, as well as in Lake Bunyonyi.

Pollination is entomophilous. In Kirstenbosch Botanical Gardens, South Africa, the flowers are visited by honey bees. In fact, the carpellary appendages in this type of water-lily appear to have evolved specifically to attract bee species in general. In a way, these waterlilies are parasites of the services of bees, attracting the insects by deceit, without actually rewarding them for their labours. In India plants bloom and fruit from May to October.

The fruit suddenly bursts when ripe, and the scattered seed float away. The seed soon sinks. Seeds often make it to the river's edge or lake shore, and can build up a significant seedbank here. These seeds only germinate when heavy rains flood the banks, and they are submerged under a layer of water. In cultivation, the plants take three to four years to flower from seed. In colder climates, the plants lose their leaves and go dormant during the winter, with the rhizomes remaining alive below the water.

Gomphonema gracile is an epiphytic diatom found on N. caerulea in high elevation Lake Naivasha, Kenya. In Kenya, N. caerulea is positively associated with the freshwater snail Biomphalaria pfeifferi, which is a main host of human schistosomiasis. The edible American crayfish Procambarus clarkii eliminates the mollusc, as well as feeding on the water-lily. The crayfish was first introduced to Kenya in 1966 as a species with which to enhance the local fisheries. In Lake Naivasha, N. caerulea was extremely common until the 1970s, and there is still a seedbank around the shores of the lake. Procambarus clarkii was introduced to the lake in 1970, and now supports an annual harvest of a few thousand kilograms, but it may have been responsible for eliminating not only the water-lily in the main lake by 1983, but all native aquatic plant species in this water body. It is not the only potential culprit; invasive mats of exotic floating vegetation have also taken over the lake, two different commercially fishable fish species have been introduced, and the new fisheries upon these three species could all be responsible, or a combination.

== Uses ==
The rootstock of the blue water lily was collected and eaten in western South Africa around 1800, either raw or in curries, in particular by the Cape Malays and farming communities in the Cape, although this practice has now died out.

This water lily has been used to produce perfumes since ancient times; it is also used in aromatherapy. According to a multimodal analytical study, traces of Peganum harmala, and Nymphaea nouchali var. caerulea were identified in an Egyptian ritual Bes-vase, of the 2nd century BCE.

=== Psychoactive effects ===
It has been suggested that Nymphaea caerulea was used in ancient Egypt for religious rituals, sexual enhancement, and other purposes, due to the purported presence of nuciferine and apomorphine, the latter of which is also used today to treat erectile dysfunction. The key active constituents and mechanisms of action of the plant are unknown.

Andrew Sherratt and colleagues investigated the effects of Nymphaea caerulea in two human volunteers in the 1998 television series Sacred Weeds. It was the first known study and demonstration of the psychoactive effects of the plant in humans. They found that it produced a variety of reported effects, including enhanced mood and happiness, relaxation, talkativeness, disinhibition, calmness, alertness, heightened awareness, restlessness, tiredness, sedation, drowsiness, and next-day headache, among others. One researcher summarized it as a state of euphoria and tranquilization. Another researcher opined that it seemed similar, in some ways, to the effects of MDMA (ecstasy). The onset was 15 minutes and the duration was short at just a few hours. Sherratt and colleagues concluded that Nymphaea caerulea might indeed have been used as a drug in ancient Egypt.

Researchers at the University of California, Berkeley, have investigated the authenticity of blue lotus (Nymphaea caerulea) flowers sold on online marketplaces like Etsy. The research involved comparing the alkaloid content of flowers purchased online with that of verified Nymphaea caerulea specimens cultivated at the UC Botanical Garden's Virginia Haldan Tropical House. The analysis revealed that the authentic Egyptian blue lotus contained significantly higher levels of nuciferine, a psychoactive compound, than the Etsy-sourced samples. This finding suggests that many flowers sold online as blue lotus are, in fact, visually similar water lilies but not the authentic Nymphaea caerulea. Liam McEvoy, who led the study, concluded, "The stuff being sold online is not the same, and our findings suggest the blue lotus is actually unique in comparison to other water lilies."

=== Cultivation ===
It is grown as an ornamental plant for water gardens in tropical to subtropical regions around the world. It is easy to grow in ponds in any part of Southern Africa, including the highveld, and is hardy to -1 °C.

'Valentina's Pale Blue Eyes' is a registered cultivar of this species from 2018, bred in Italy partially from a clone known as 'Rwanda'.

The Longwood Gardens in Kennett Square, Pennsylvania has had Nymphaea caerulea in their water lilly collection since 1963. with photos of a real Nymphaea caerulea posted on their social media as recent as 2019.

=== Religion and art ===
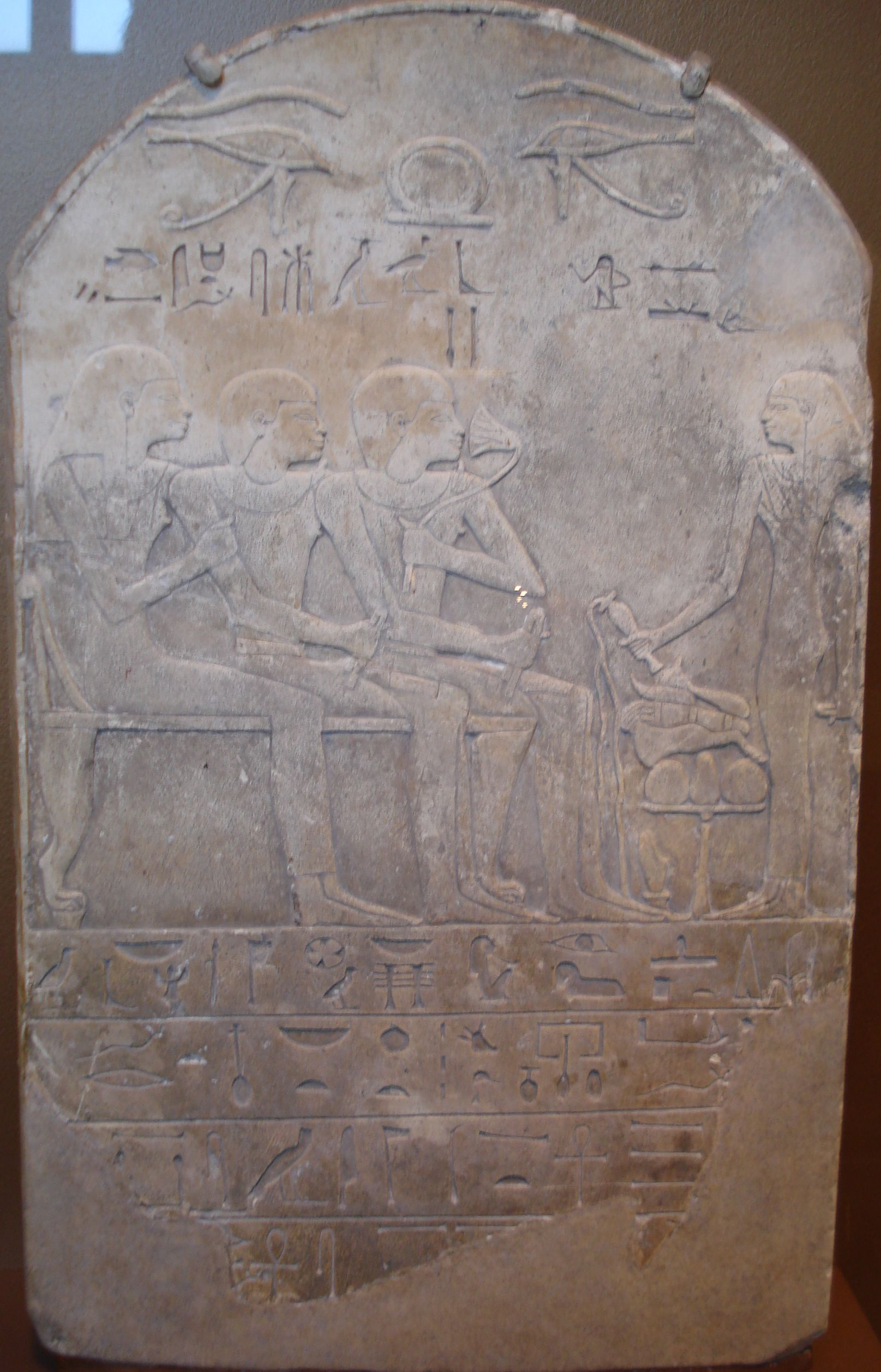
Ancient Egyptian funerary stele showing a dead man named Ba, seated at the centre, sniffing a sacred lily, New Kingdom, 18th Dynasty, ca. 1550–1292 BC

Along with the white lotus, Nymphaea lotus, also native to Egypt, the plant and flower are very frequently depicted in Ancient Egyptian art. They have been depicted in numerous stone carvings and paintings, including the walls of the temple of Karnak, and may be associated with rites pertaining to the afterlife. A number of pharaohs' mummies were covered with the petals of the flower. There are indications it was grown in special farms over 4,000 years ago to produce enough flowers for votive offerings, although it was apparently also simply grown as an ornamental in traditional Egyptian garden ponds. N. caerulea was considered extremely significant in Egyptian mythology, regarded as a symbol of the sun, since the flowers are closed at night and open again in the morning. At Heliopolis, the origin of the world was taught to have been when the sun god Ra emerged from a lotus flower growing in "primordial waters". At night, he was believed to retreat into the flower again. Due to its colour, it was identified, in some beliefs, as having been the original container, in a similar manner to an egg, of Atum, and in similar beliefs Ra, both solar deities. As such, its properties form the origin of the "lotus variant" of the Ogdoad cosmogony. It was also the symbol of the Egyptian deity Nefertem.

Often depicted in ancient art and found in tombs—including the petals discovered in King Tutankhamun's burial chamber in 1922—it held a sacred role in religious rituals. Notably featured in the Festival of Drunkenness honoring Hathor, goddess of love and fertility, the flower was believed to induce visions when soaked in wine, possibly used in ecstatic or hallucinogenic rites. Native to the Nile River, the species has become rare due to ecological changes, particularly following the construction of the Aswan Dam, and is now considered threatened.

=== Toxicity and health effects ===
While unregulated in the United States and sold as a dietary supplement, consumption of Nymphaea caerulea can cause toxic effects. Modern use often involves drinking infusions (water or alcohol based) made from the plant material or inhaling extracts using electronic cigarettes (vaping). With the latter being a more rapid and efficient method, delivering higher effective doses to the body and increasing the potential for toxicity. A 2021 case series described five patients who presented to an emergency department with altered mental status after consuming blue lotus. Symptoms included sedation, disorientation, and perceptual disturbances. Other reported effects were tachycardia, anxiety, and, in one case, a persistent erection (priapism).

All patients in the series recovered with supportive care, such as intravenous fluids and observation, without needing sedating medications. The psychoactive symptoms typically resolved within 3 to 4 hours. Currently, standard urine drug screens do not detect blue lotus, complicating the diagnosis.

== Legal issues ==
=== United States ===
While Nymphaea caerulea is not a federally controlled substance in the United States according to the Drug Enforcement Administration (DEA) and is therefore legal to sell in most states, it is explicitly prohibited for use by all members of the United States Armed Forces. The plant is included on the Department of Defense Prohibited Dietary Supplement Ingredients List, and its use is a violation of the Uniform Code of Military Justice (UCMJ) and Army Regulations. U.S. military authorities have warned that blue lotus products are often laced with other substances like synthetic cannabinoids, which are illegal and can result in a positive urinalysis test.

=== Other countries ===
Nymphaea caerulea has been illegal in Latvia since November 2009. It is a schedule 1 drug. Possession of up to 1 gram are fined up to 280 euros; for second offences within a year period, criminal charges are applied. Possession of larger quantities can be punished by up to 15 years in prison. The plant was banned in Poland in March 2009. Possession and distribution lead to a criminal charge. N. caerulea has been illegal in Russia since April 2009, along with related products such as Salvia divinorum, Argyreia nervosa, and others.

== See also ==
- List of plants known as lotus
- Fleur-de-lis
- Nymphaea lotus, the Egyptian white water lily
- Nymphaea nouchali, the star lotus, in Sanskrit utpala
- Palmette
- Sacred Weeds, a Channel 4 TV series examining the effects of various psychoactive plants (including the blue lily) on volunteers
- List of plants known as lily
