= Utpala =

Sanskrit neuter noun

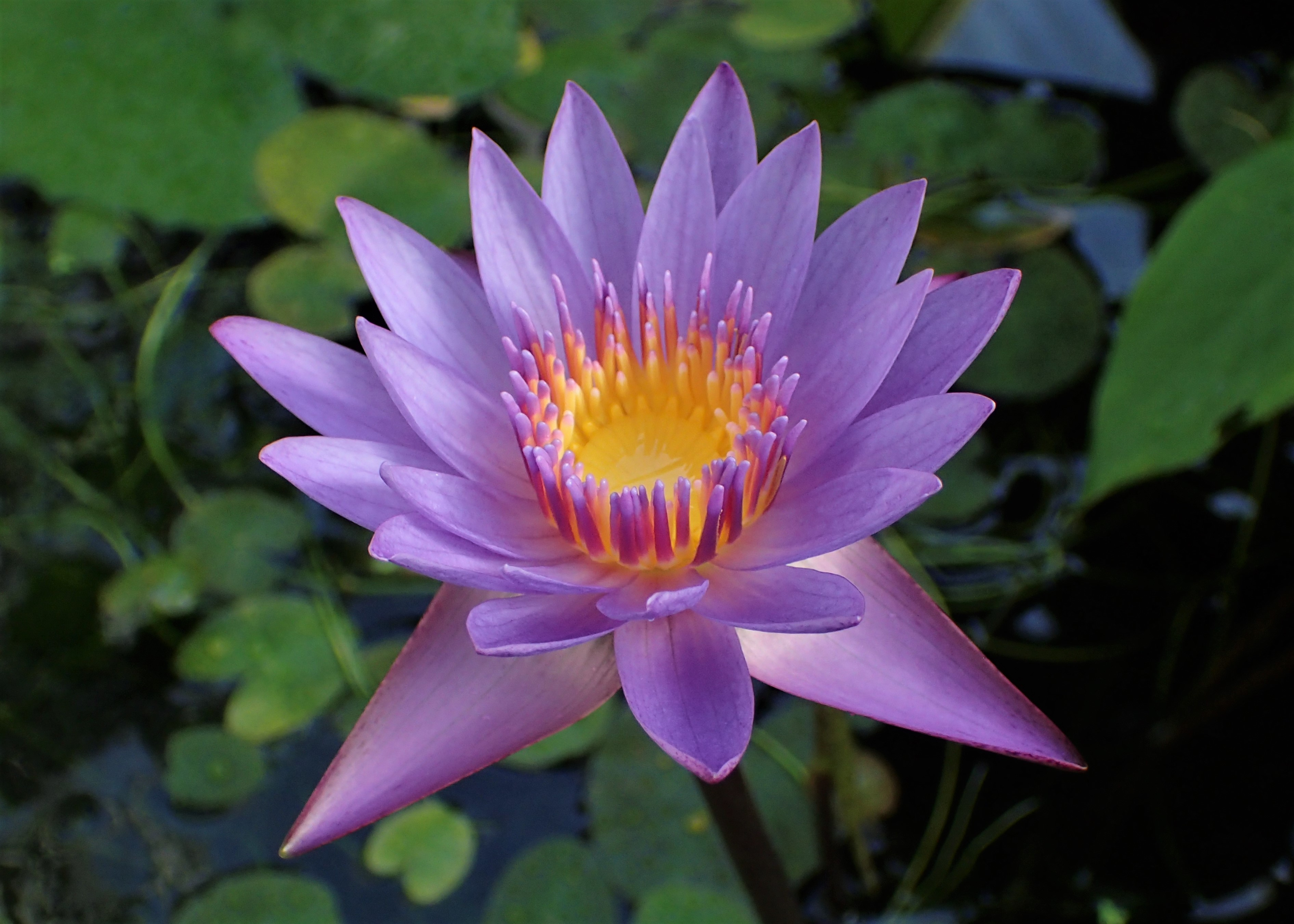
Flower of Nymphaea nouchali

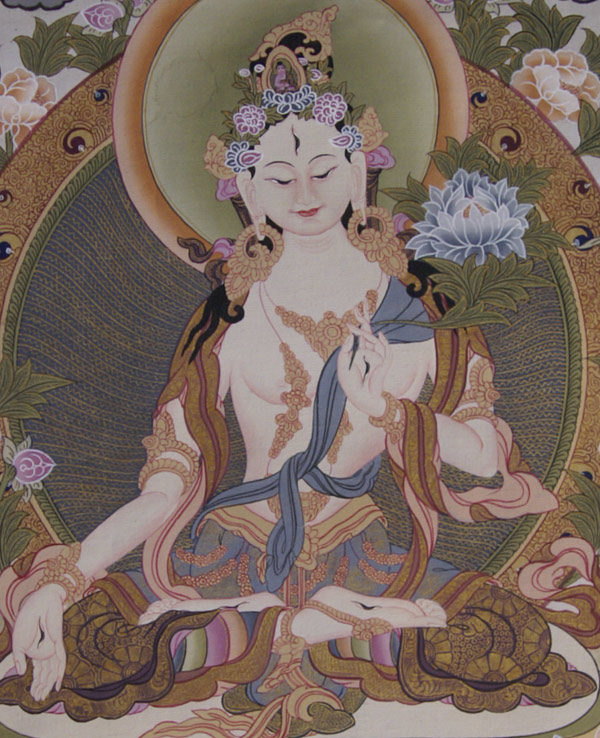
White Tara holding an utpala flower.

Utpala in Sanskrit is a neuter noun with two meanings, both given by Amarakoṣa (a lexicon of circa. 400 AD). The first meaning is Nymphaea nouchali, the "blue lotus", also known as kuvalaya in Sanskrit. The second meaning of utpala is a variety of medicinal plant known as 'kooṭh' in Hindi and 'kusṭham, vyādhi, paribhavyam or pāribhavyam, vāpyam, pākalam' according to Amarkośa.

In Buddhist art the utpala flower is an attribute of the goddess Tara, who very often holds one in her hand, as other Buddhist and Hindu figures may also do. Later, the utpala becomes specific to the Green Tara form, while the White Tara holds a white lotus flower (probably Nymphaea pubescens, syn. Nymphaea lotus var. pubescens). In Tibet, where none of the tender aquatic plants that may be known as lotus can grow, utpala became a general term for all of them.

Monier-Williams gives the following meanings of utpala: (1) the blossom of the blue lotus Nymphaea nouchali (-Mahābhārata, Rāmāyana, Suśruta, Raghuvamsa, Meghdoota, etc.),(2) a seed of Nymphaea nouchali (-Suśruta), (3) the plant Costus speciosus (-Bhagavata Purāna), (4) any water-lily, any flower, (-lexicons) (5) a particular hell (-Buddhist literature), (6) name of a Nāga, (7) names of several persons, including an astronomer, (8) its feminine form utpalā meant a river (-Harivamśa), (9) its feminine form utpalā also meant a kind of cake made of unwinnowed corn (-lexicons);

An unrelated homonym, compounded from ud "apart" + pala "flesh" means 'fleshless, emaciated' (-lexicons) and is the name of a particular hell (-lexicons).
