= Gamal Khashaba =

- جمال خشبة

President of the National Committee for Air Scouts of the Egyptian Federation for Scouts and Girl Guides

Gamal Khashaba (Egyptian Arabic: جمال خشبة) served as the President of the National Committee for Air Scouts of the Egyptian Federation for Scouts and Girl Guides as well as the General Secretary of the Arab Scout Bureau.

In 1982, he was awarded the 156th Bronze Wolf, the only distinction of the World Organization of the Scout Movement, awarded by the World Scout Committee for exceptional services to world Scouting.
