= Sacred Weeds =

- Genre: Documentary
- Created by: Sarah Marris
- Presented by: Andrew Sherratt
- Country of origin: United Kingdom
- Original language: English
- No. of episodes: 4

Original release
- Network: Channel 4
- Release: 1998

Sacred Weeds is a four-part television series of 50 minute documentaries investigating the cultural impact of psychoactive plants on a broad array of early civilisations. The series was filmed at Hammerwood Park by the producer, Sarah Marris, and her production company TVF. It was broadcast in the summer of 1998 on Channel 4, a British television network.

Andrew Sherratt, then a Reader in European Prehistory at the University of Oxford, was the series host. Each episode began and ended with Sherratt inscribing his diary with his reflections on the series' scientific and cultural investigations. In each episode the series investigated one psychoactive plant and its cultural significance. Three specialists of various scientific disciplines were invited to monitor two volunteers who had taken each plant. After the four episodes, Sherratt assigned considerably more significance to the psychoactive properties of plants in ancient civilization and the prehistoric period than expert knowledge hitherto.

== Part one: The Fly Agaric Mushroom ==
Scientists:

- Michael Carmichael, ethnobotanist/anthropologist
- Cosmo Hollstrom, psychiatrist and lecturer at Imperial College
- Joanna Iddon, from CeNeS Cognition

Volunteers: Ed Taylor, Johnny Green

Memorable moments include a long haired participant in baggy clothes, athletically climbing a large tree and yelping with excitement. The clinical and skeptical approach of Cosmo contrasted with the psychological and forensic approach of Michael Carmichael. The two scholars debated the significance of research into altered states of consciousness.

== Part two: Salvia Divinorum ==
Scientists:

- Françoise Barbira-Freedman, medical anthropologist and lecturer at the University of Cambridge
- Tim Kendall, psychiatrist and director of the Centre for Psychotherapeutic Studies
- Jon Robbins, pharmacologist at King's College London

Volunteers: Daniel Siebert, Sean Thomas

== Part three: Henbane the witches brew? ==
Scientists:

- Paul Devereux, author and researcher of the cultural importance of hallucinogenic plants
- Diane Purkiss, historian and lecturer at the University of Reading
- Elizabeth Williamson, from the University of London's School of Pharmacy

Volunteers: Paul Rousseau, Jim Boyd

== Part four: The Blue Lily flower power? ==
Scientists:

- Michael Carmichael, Ethnobotanist/Anthropologist
- Alan Lloyd, Egyptologist and chairman of the Egypt Exploration Society
- Susan Duty, pharmacologist at King's College London

Volunteers: Robert Barnes, Marie McCartney

The series ended with the investigation of the psychoactive effects of the Blue Lily (Nymphaea caerulea), a sacred plant in ancient Egypt. Michael Carmichael suggested that the psychoactive effects of the blue lily and other psychoactive plants established a new foundation for understanding the origins of philosophy and religion in ancient Egypt. Alan Lloyd, the Egyptologist took a more cautious approach. After witnessing the effects of the plant in two volunteers, all parties agreed that it was a psychoactive plant. Sherratt accepted the new paradigm for the origins of ancient philosophy and religion in his summation of the series.

== Video ==
- Sacred Weeds at Top Documentary Films
