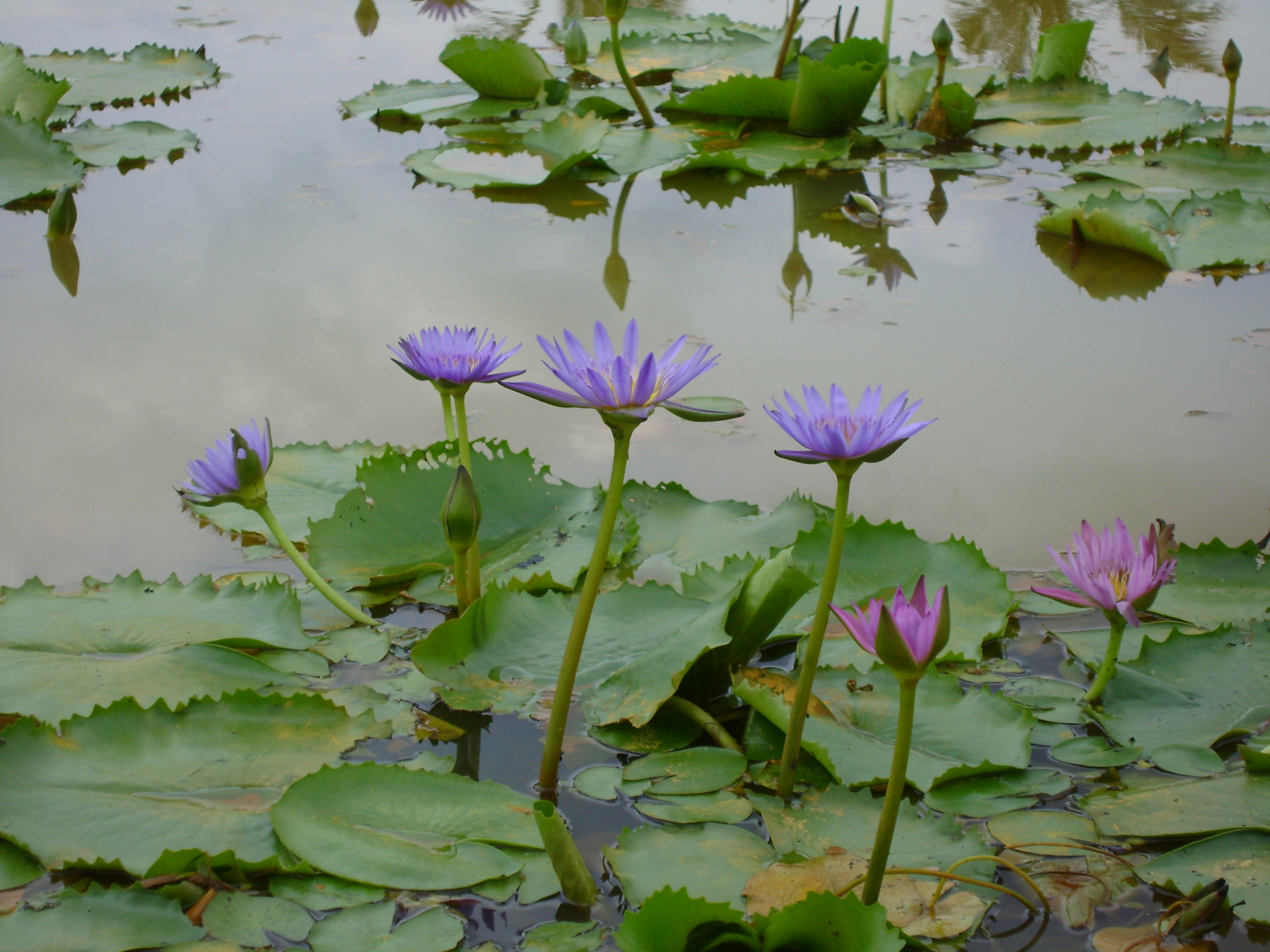
- Growing in Vietnam

Conservation status
- Least Concern (IUCN 3.1)

Scientific classification
- Kingdom: Plantae
- Clade: Tracheophytes
- Clade: Angiosperms
- Order: Nymphaeales
- Family: Nymphaeaceae
- Genus: Nymphaea
- Subgenus: Nymphaea subg. Brachyceras
- Species: N. nouchali

Binomial name
- Nymphaea nouchali Burm. f.

Varieties
- Nymphaea nouchali var. caerulea (Savigny) Verdc.; Nymphaea nouchali var. mutandaensis Verdc.; Nymphaea nouchali var. nouchali; Nymphaea nouchali var. ovalifolia (Conard) Verdc.; Nymphaea nouchali var. petersiana (Klotzsch) Verdc.; Nymphaea nouchali var. versicolor (Sims) Guruge & Yakand.; Nymphaea nouchali var. zanzibariensis (Casp.) Verdc.

Synonyms
- See here

= Nymphaea nouchali =

Species of aquatic plant

Nymphaea nouchali, often known by its synonym Nymphaea stellata, or by common names blue lotus, star lotus, red water lily, dwarf aquarium lily, blue water lily, blue star water lily or manel flower, is a water lily of genus Nymphaea. It is native to southern and eastern parts of Asia, and is the national flower of Bangladesh and Sri Lanka. This species is usually considered to include the blue Egyptian lotus N. nouchali var. caerulea. In the past, taxonomic confusion has occurred, with the name Nymphaea nouchali incorrectly applied to Nymphaea pubescens.

== Description ==
N. nouchali is a day-blooming non-viviparous plant with submerged roots and stems. Part of the leaves are submerged, while others rise slightly above the surface. The leaves are round and green on top; they usually have a darker underside. The floating leaves have undulating edges that give them a crenellated appearance. Their size is about 20–23 cm (7.9–9.1 in) and their spread is up to 1.5 metres (4.9 ft) from the rhizome.

This water lily has a beautiful flower which is usually white or blue in color. Its variants occur in white, blue, violet, purple, pink & cream/yellowish white colours. The flower has four or five sepals and 13-15 petals that have an angular appearance, making the flower look star-shaped from above. The cup-like calyx has a diameter of 4–15 cm (1.6–5.9 in).

=== Cytology ===
The chromosome count is n = 38 or n = 42. The genome size is 1193.16 Mb.

== Taxonomy ==
It was first described by Nicolaas Laurens Burman in 1768. The species concept was significantly expanded by Bernard Verdcourt in 1989. Several species, namely Nymphaea caerulea Savigny, Nymphaea ovalifolia Conard, Nymphaea colorata Peter, and Nymphaea petersiana Klotzsch were merged into Nymphaea nouchali as new varieties. Additionally, two more varieties were described: Nymphaea nouchali var. mutandaensis Verdc. and Nymphaea nouchali var. versicolor (Sims) Guruge & Yakand. published by Shashika Kumudumali Guruge and Deepthi Yakandawala in 2017. This broad circumscription of Nymphaea nouchali has been criticised as highly unnatural. Nymphaea petersiana turned out to be a member of the subgenus Nymphaea subg. Lotos and is therefore unrelated to Nymphaea nouchali. Nymphaea nouchali is placed in the subgenus Nymphaea subg. Brachyceras.

=== Synonyms ===
Synonyms of Nymphaea nouchali var. caerulea (Savigny) Verdc.
- Castalia caerulea (Savigny) Tratt.
- Leuconymphaea caerulea (Savigny) Kuntze
- Nymphaea caerulea Savigny
- Nymphaea stellata f. caerulea (Savigny) Casp.
- Castalia capensis (Thunb.) J.Schust.
- Castalia scutifolia Salisb.
- Leuconymphaea berneriana (Planch.) Kuntze
- Leuconymphaea emirnensis (Planch.) Kuntze
- Nymphaea bernieriana Planch.
- Nymphaea caerulea var. albiflora Lovassy
- Nymphaea caerulea var. eigii Warb.
- Nymphaea caerulea var. versicolor T.Durand & H.Durand
- Nymphaea calliantha Conard
- Nymphaea calliantha var. nelsonii Burtt Davy
- Nymphaea calliantha var. tenuis Conard
- Nymphaea capensis Thunb.
- Nymphaea capensis var. alba K.C.Landon
- Nymphaea capensis var. madagascariensis (DC.) Conard
- Nymphaea coerulea Andrews
- Nymphaea cyclophylla R.E.Fr.
- Nymphaea edgeworthii Lehm.
- Nymphaea emirnensis Planch.
- Nymphaea engleri Gilg
- Nymphaea madagascariensis DC.
- Nymphaea magnifica Gilg
- Nymphaea mildbraedii Gilg
- Nymphaea muschleriana Gilg
- Nymphaea nubica Lehm.
- Nymphaea radiata Bercht. & Opiz
- Nymphaea scutifolia (Salisb.) DC.
- Nymphaea spectabilis Gilg
- Nymphaea sphaerantha Peter
- Nymphaea stellata adscendens Casp.
- Nymphaea stellata albida Casp.
- Nymphaea stellata approximata Casp.
- Nymphaea stellata coerulea Casp.
- Nymphaea stellata distans Casp.
- Nymphaea stellata immaculata Casp.
- Nymphaea stellata immaculata Casp.
- Nymphaea stellata lilacina Casp.
- Nymphaea stellata lilacina Casp.
- Nymphaea stellata maculata Casp.
- Nymphaea stellata maculata Casp.
- Nymphaea stellata punctata Casp.
- Nymphaea stellata spiralis Casp.
- Nymphaea stellata vulgaris Casp.
Synonyms of Nymphaea nouchali var. nouchali
- Castalia acutiloba (DC.) Hand.-Mazz.
- Castalia stellaris Salisb.
- Castalia stellata (Willd.) Blume
- Leuconymphaea stellata (Willd.) Kuntze
- Nymphaea acutiloba DC.
- Nymphaea cahlara Donn
- Nymphaea cyanea Roxb. ex G.Don
- Nymphaea henkeliana Rehnelt
- Nymphaea hookeriana Lehm.
- Nymphaea membranacea Wall. ex Casp.
- Nymphaea nouchali var. cyanea (Roxb. ex G.Don) M.R.Almeida
- Nymphaea punctata Edgew.
- Nymphaea rhodantha Lehm.
- Nymphaea stellata Willd.
- Nymphaea stellata var. albiflora Lovassy
- Nymphaea stellata var. cyanea (Roxb. ex G.Don) Hook.f. & Thomson
- Nymphaea stellata var. parviflora Hook.f. & Thomson
- Nymphaea sumatrana Miq.
- Nymphaea voalefoka Lat.-Marl.
Synonyms of Nymphaea nouchali var. ovalifolia (Conard) Verdc.
- Nymphaea ovalifolia Conard
- Nymphaea vernayi Bremek. & Oberm.
Synonyms of Nymphaea nouchali var. versicolor (Sims) Guruge & Yakand.
- Castalia versicolor (Sims) Tratt.
- Nymphaea stellata var. versicolor (Sims) Hook.f. & Thomson
- Nymphaea versicolor Sims
- Nymphaea malabarica Poir.
Synonyms of Nymphaea nouchali var. zanzibariensis (Casp.) Verdc.
- Castalia zanzibarensis (Casp.) Britton
- Leuconymphaea zanzibariensis (Casp.) Kuntze
- Nymphaea caerulea subsp. zanzibariensis (Casp.) S.W.L.Jacobs
- Nymphaea capensis var. zanzibariensis (Casp.) Conard
- Nymphaea stellata var. zanzibariensis (Casp.) Hook.f.
- Nymphaea zanzibariensis Casp.
- Nymphaea capensis f. rosea Conard
- Nymphaea colorata Peter
- Nymphaea colorata var. parviflora Peter
- Nymphaea grandiflora Peter
- Nymphaea polychroma Peter
- Nymphaea purpurascens Peter
- Nymphaea zanzibariensis var. azurea Lovassy
- Nymphaea zanzibariensis var. pallida Peter
- Nymphaea zanzibariensis var. rosea Lovassy
- Nymphaea zanzibariensis var. rubra Lovassy
- Nymphaea zanzibariensis var. violacea Lovassy

=== Natural hybridisation ===
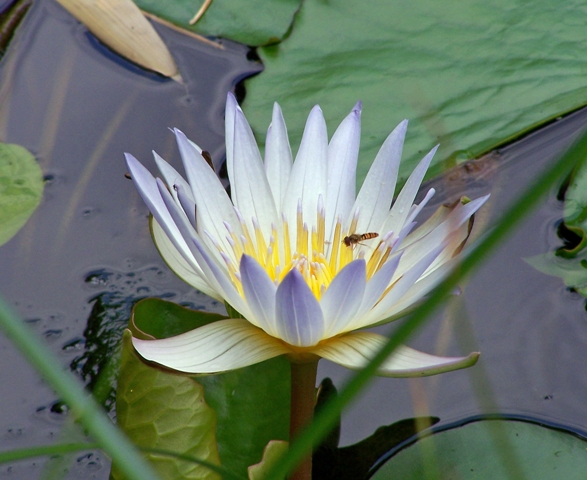
Detail of Nymphaea × daubenyana flower, a natural hybrid of Nymphaea nouchali var. caerulea and Nymphaea micrantha

Together with Nymphaea micrantha, Nymphaea nouchali var. caerulea forms the natural hybrid Nymphaea × daubenyana native to Chad.

== Distribution and habitat ==
This aquatic plant is native in a broad region from Afghanistan, the Indian subcontinent, to Taiwan, southeast Asia and Australia. It has been long valued as a garden flower in Thailand and Myanmar to decorate ponds and gardens. In its natural state, N. nouchali is found in static or slow-flowing aquatic habitats of low to moderate depth.

== Ecology ==
The leaves of the lily can be affected by a water-born fungi, Doassansiopsis nymphaea.

== Use ==
=== Symbolism ===
Nymphaea nouchali is the national flower of Bangladesh. A pale blue-flowered N. nouchali is the national flower of Sri Lanka, where it is known as nil mānel or nil mahanel (නිල් මානෙල්).

In Sri Lanka, this plant usually grows in buffalo ponds and natural wetlands. Its beautiful aquatic flower has been mentioned in Sanskrit, Pali, and Sinhala literary works since ancient times under the names kuvalaya, kumuda, indhīwara, niluppala, nilōtpaḷa, and nilupul as a symbol of virtue, discipline, and purity. Buddhist lore in Sri Lanka claims that this flower was one of the 108 auspicious signs found on Prince Siddhartha's footprint. It is said that when Buddha died, lotus flowers blossomed everywhere he had walked in his lifetime.

Claire Waight Keller included the plant to represent Bangladesh and Sri Lanka in Meghan Markle's wedding veil, which included the distinctive flora of each Commonwealth country.

N. nouchali might have been one of the plants eaten by the Lotophagi of Homer's Odyssey.

=== Horticulture ===
N. nouchali is used as an ornamental plant because of its spectacular flowers, and is most commonly used for the traditional and cultural festivals in Sri Lanka. It is also popular as an aquarium plant under the name "dwarf lily" or "dwarf red lily". Sometimes, it is grown for its flowers, while other aquarists prefer to trim the lily pads, and just have the underwater foliage.

=== Herbal medicine ===
N. nouchali is considered a medicinal plant in Indian Ayurvedic medicine under the name ambal; it was mainly used to treat indigestion.

=== Food ===
Like all water lilies, its pear-shaped, brown cottony-covered, potato-sized rhizomes, leaves and most of the plant are poisonous, and contain an alkaloid called nupharin. Unlike European species, this can (and must) be neutralised in the rhizomes of this species by boiling. In India these have been eaten as a famine food or as a medicinal. In Vietnam it was eaten roasted. In Sri Lanka it was formerly eaten as a type of medicine and its price was too high to serve as a normal meal, but in the 1940s some villagers began to cultivate the water lilies in the paddy fields left uncultivated during the monsoon season (Yala season), and the price dropped. It is eaten boiled and in curries. The tubers of this species are completely edible, during the dry season they consist almost entirely of starch, and were eaten in West Africa, usually boiled or roasted.

In Bangladesh, the stems of Nymphaea nouchali, known locally as shapla, are widely consumed as a vegetable. The dish, commonly called shaplar data, is cooked with mustard seeds, spices, and sometimes dried fish. Unlike some regions where the plant is used as a famine food, it is a regular part of rural diets and seasonal cuisine in Bangladesh.

The dried plant is collected from ponds, tanks, and marshes during the dry season and used in India as animal forage.

=== Heraldry ===
The emblem of surgeon and obstetrician to Napoleon, Baron Antoine Dubois, (1756–1837).

Personal coat of arms of Cyril Newall, 1st Baron Newall (1946)

National Emblem of Bangladesh (1972–present)

== See also ==
- Nymphaea caerulea, the Egyptian blue lotus or sacred blue lily
- Nymphaea lotus, the white lotus or Egyptian white water lily
- Nelumbo nucifera, the Indian lotus, sacred lotus
- List of freshwater aquarium plant species
