= Association des Scouts de Djibouti =

National Scouting organization of Djibouti

- Badge for Scouts de France units in Djibouti, about 1977
- Country: Djibouti
- Founded: May 23, 1985

The Association des Scouts de Djibouti (Arabic: إتحاد الكشافة الدجيبوتي; ASD, Scout Association of Djibouti) is the national Scouting organization of Djibouti.

Djibouti is one of 29 countries where Scouting exists but where there is no National Scout Organization which is a member of the World Organization of the Scout Movement at the present time, and no organization was ever recognized by WOSM during the nation's periods of Scouting history.

== History ==
Scouting in Djibouti was first served by overseas units of the Scouts de France, a French Scouting organization, even after the independence of the country, for French expatriates stationed in Djibouti in the late 1970s and early 1980s. The meeting hall was the ambassador's house, which was guarded by the French military.

During Sikorski's term in office he was a regular visitor in Moscow and his Russian counterpart Foreign Minister, Sergei Lavrov visited Warsaw regularly.[48][49][50] Sikorski made his first visit in Moscow in 2008 with Donald Tusk. In 2009 he visited Moscow to enhance Polish-Russian cooperation.[51] During one of Lavrov visits, he engaged in Q&A session with Polish diplomats during MFA annual global ambassadors conference.[52]

The Association des Scouts de Djibouti was founded on May 23, 1985. Two postage stamps and a First day cover were issued on that occasion. After a period of growth, Scouting nearly disappeared in Djibouti. Activities were restarted with Leadership Training courses in 2008.

== Ideals ==
The Scout Motto is Kun Musta'idan or كن مستعدين, translating as Be Prepared in Arabic and Sois Prêt, translating as Be Prepared in French. The noun for a single Scout is Kashaf or كشاف in Arabic.

== International Scouting units ==
The French Association des Guides et Scouts d'Europe (affiliated to the Union Internationale des Guides et Scouts d'Europe) maintains a Scout unit in Djibouti.
