= Joudaim =

Joudaim جوددائم
- Town
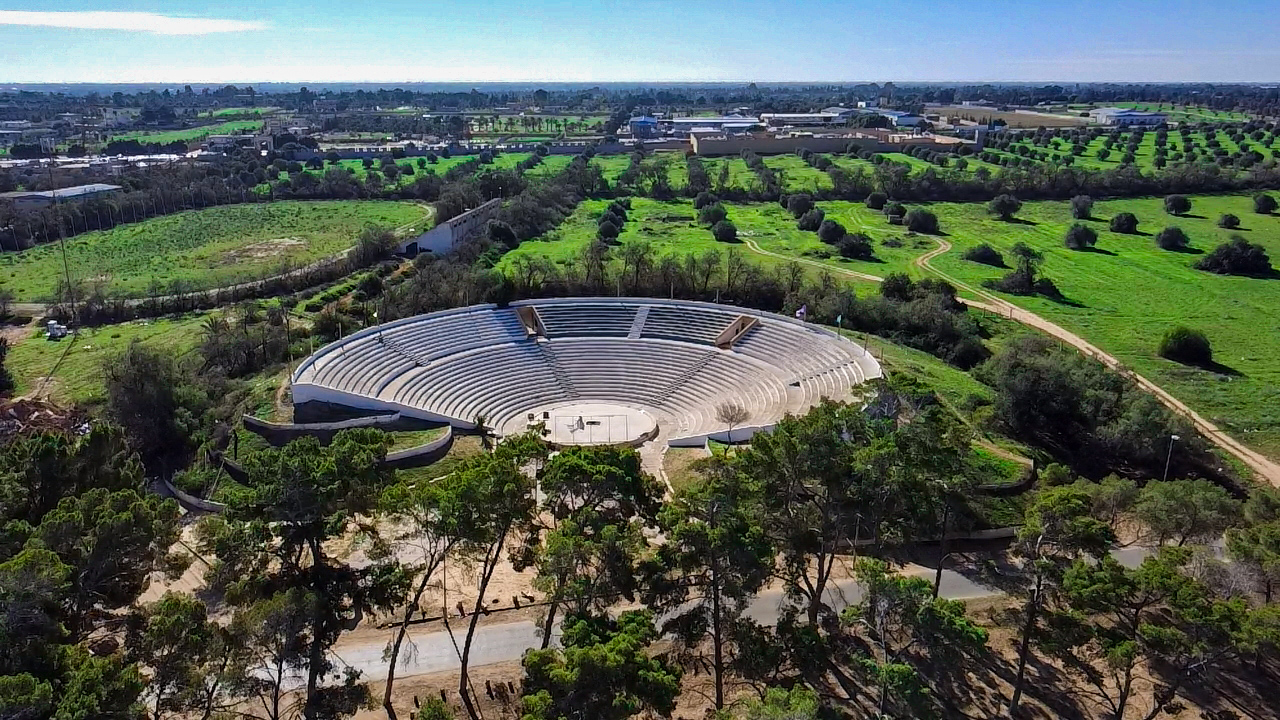

- Location in Libya
- Coordinates: 32.7778°N 12.7826°E
- Country: Libya
- Region: Tripolitania
- District: Zawiya
- Time zone: UTC+2 (EET)

Joudaim (جوددائم, ital. Oliveti) is a town in Libya northeast of Zawiya, noted during the push of the National Liberation Army on their way to "27km" crossing, before entering Tripoli. On 21 August 2011, a Sky News report stated that Joudaim had been taken by anti-Gaddafi forces as they advanced towards Tripoli as part of the 2011 Libyan civil war.

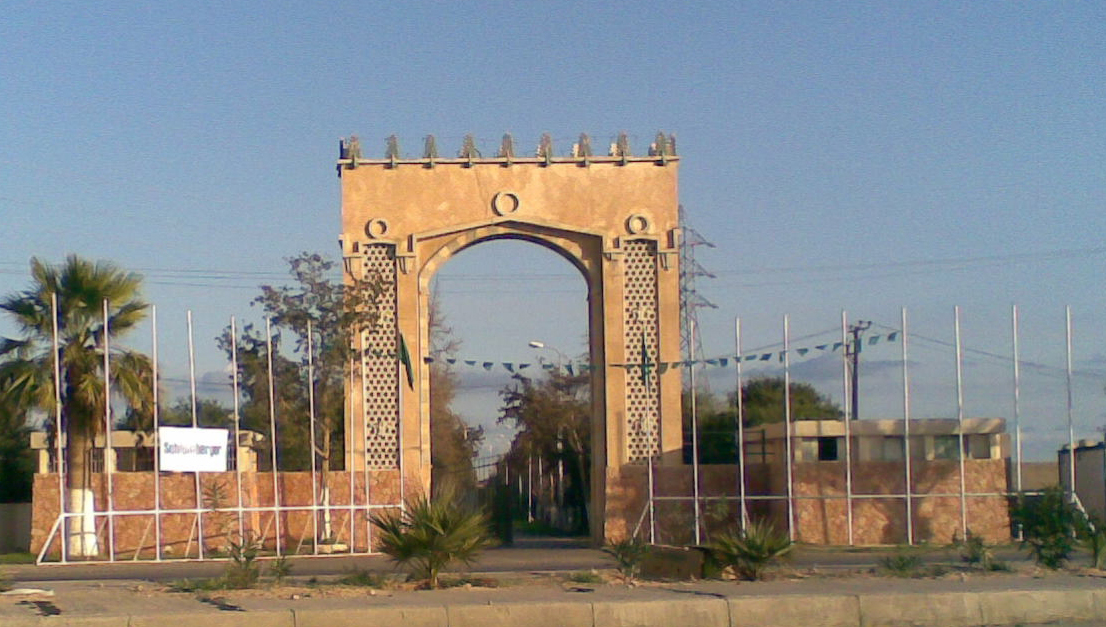

The area is heavily forested and was host to several Arab Region Scout Jamborees.
