= Nymphaea nouchali var. mutandaensis =

Conservation status
- Endangered (IUCN 3.1)

Scientific classification
- Kingdom: Plantae
- Clade: Embryophytes
- Clade: Tracheophytes
- Clade: Spermatophytes
- Clade: Angiosperms
- Order: Nymphaeales
- Family: Nymphaeaceae
- Genus: Nymphaea
- Subgenus: Nymphaea subg. Brachyceras
- Species: N. nouchali
- Variety: N. n. var. mutandaensis

Trinomial name
- Nymphaea nouchali var. mutandaensis Verdc.
- Nymphaea nouchali var. mutandaensis is endemic to Uganda

Species of aquatic plant

Nymphaea nouchali var. mutandaensis is a variety of the water lily species Nymphaea nouchali Burm.f. endemic to Uganda.

== Description ==
=== Vegetative characteristics ===
Nymphaea nouchali var. mutandaensis is an aquatic herb.

=== Generative characteristics ===
The purple flowers have a yellow centre.

== Taxonomy ==
It was first described as Nymphaea nouchali var. mutandaensis Verdc. by Bernard Verdcourt in 1989.

== Conservation ==
The IUCN conservation status is endangered (EN). It is threatened by the invasive Louisiana Red Claw Crayfish, Procambarus clarki, which has been introduced to its natural habitat in Lake Mutanda and Lake Bunyonyi.

== Ecology ==
=== Habitat ===
It occurs in lakes. It occurs in shallow sheltered waters at altitudes of 1,770-1,950 m above sea level.
