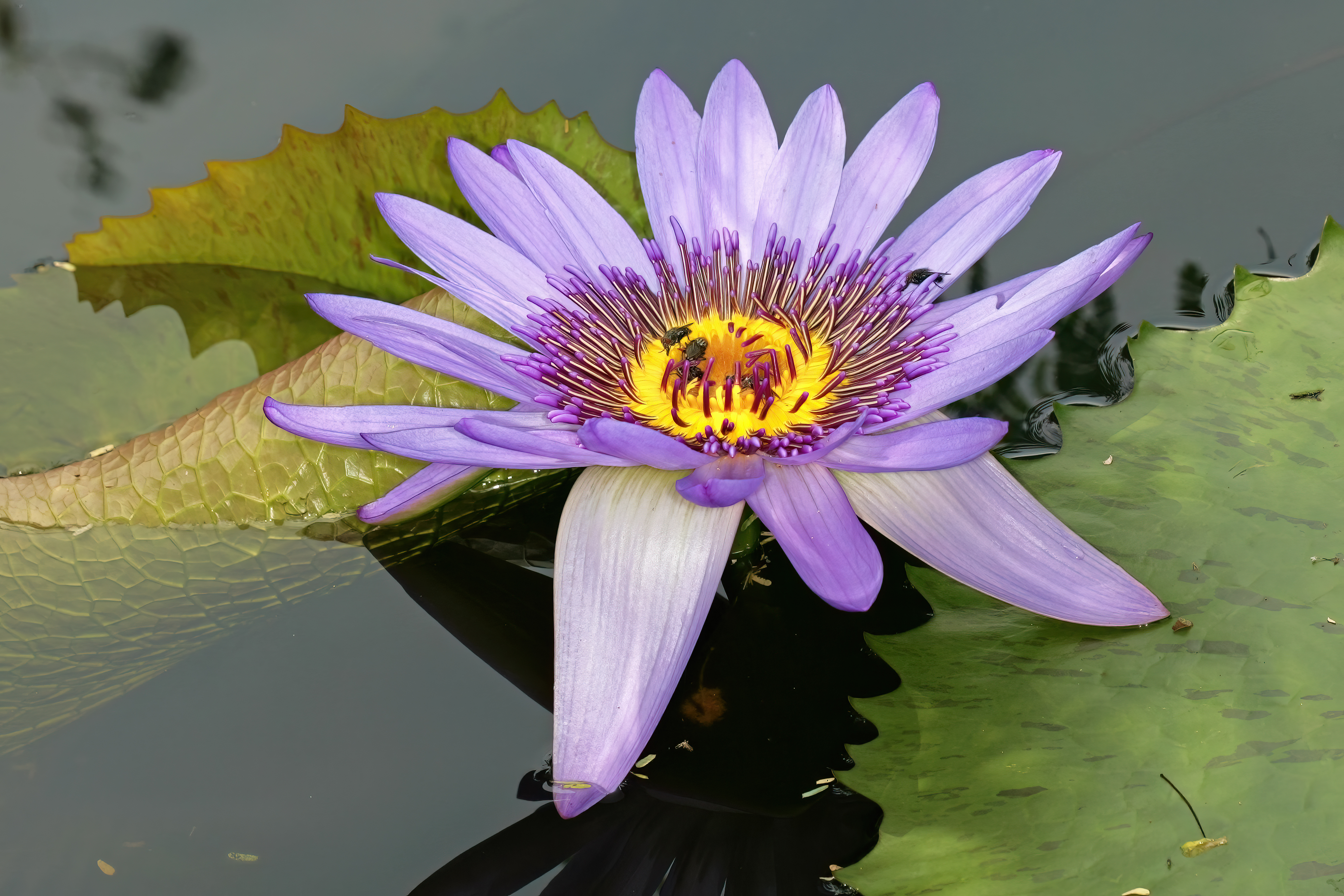

Scientific classification
- Kingdom: Plantae
- Clade: Embryophytes
- Clade: Tracheophytes
- Clade: Spermatophytes
- Clade: Angiosperms
- Order: Nymphaeales
- Family: Nymphaeaceae
- Genus: Nymphaea
- Subgenus: Nymphaea subg. Lotos
- Species: N. petersiana

Binomial name
- Nymphaea petersiana Klotzsch

Synonyms
- Nymphaea nouchali Burm. f. var. petersiana (Klotzsch) Verdc.; Nymphaea calophylla Gilg

= Nymphaea petersiana =

Species of aquatic plant

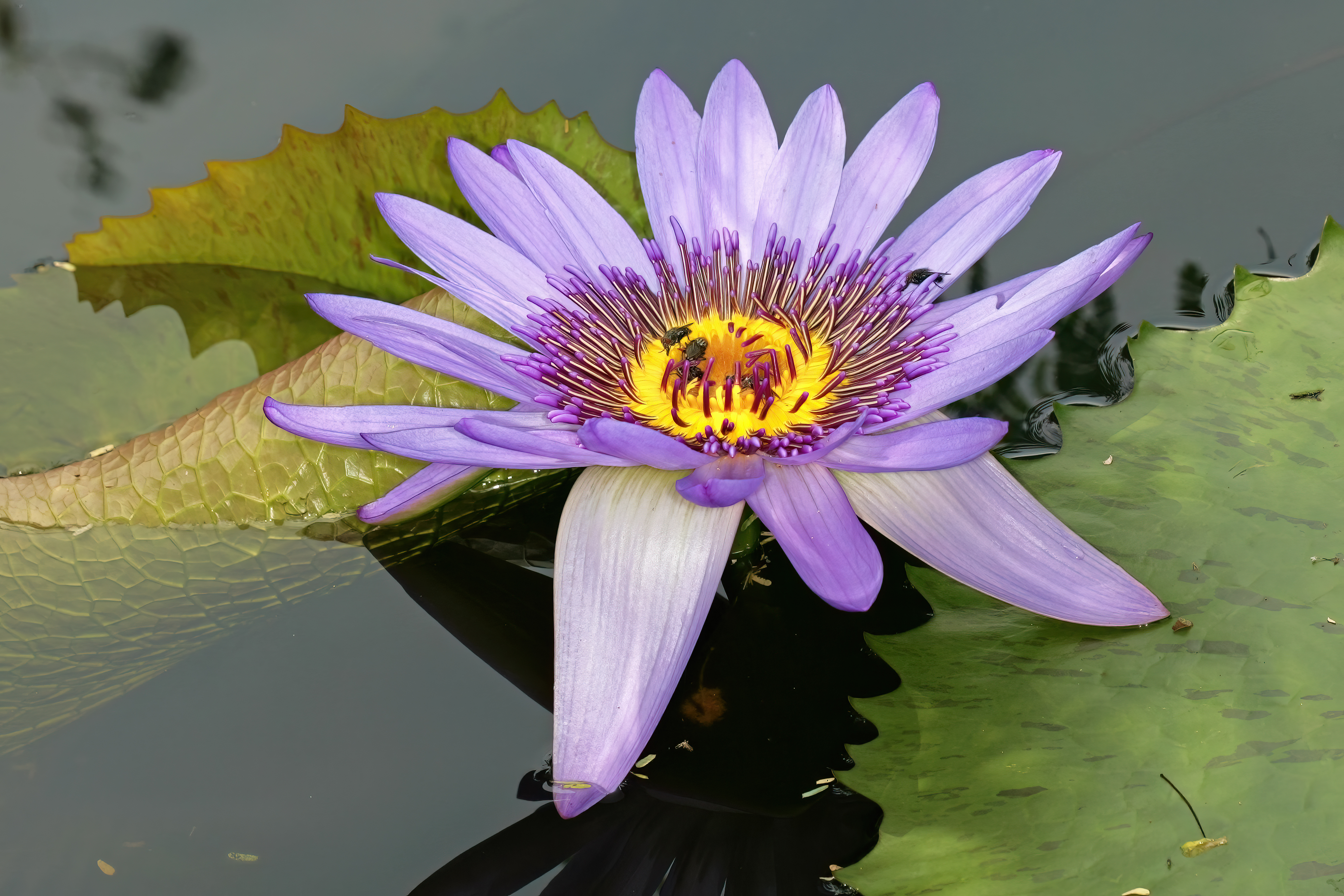
Nymphaea nouchali var. petersiana

Nymphaea petersiana is a species of the genus Nymphaea native to the region spanning from Tanzania to South Africa.

== Description ==
=== Vegetative characteristics ===
Nymphaea petersiana is an aquatic, rhizomatous, perennial plant with a tuberous rhizome. The suborbicular to elliptic, 17–40 cm long, and 16–32 cm wide leaves have a sinuate to dentate margin. The adaxial leaf surface is green and smooth, and the abaxial leaf surface is purple, red, or green with prominent venation.

=== Generative characteristics ===
The 6-12 cm wide, blue, white, or pink flowers emerge above the water surface. The flowers have four petals, and 14-20 petals. The androecium consists of 100 stamens with a white apical appendage. The gynoecium consists of 16–20 carpels. The globose, 2 cm long, and 3 cm wide fruit bears pubescent, ellipsoid, 1 mm long seeds.

== Taxonomy ==
=== Publication ===
It was first described as Nymphaea petersiana Klotzsch by Johann Friedrich Klotzsch in 1861. Later, it was included in the species Nymphaea nouchali Burm.f. as the variety Nymphaea nouchali var. petersiana (Klotzsch) Verdc. published by Bernard Verdcourt in 1989. This placement has been criticised as highly unnatural, as Nymphaea petersiana turned out to be a member of the subgenus Nymphaea subg. Lotos and is therefore unrelated to Nymphaea nouchali. The leaves of Nymphaea petersiana resemble those of Nymphaea subg. Lotos in respect to the dentate margin and raised leaf venation on the abaxial leaf surface, but the flowers closely resemble those of Nymphaea subg. Brachyceras.

== Etymology ==
The specific epithet petersiana honours Wilhelm Peters (1815-1883).

== Ecology ==
=== Habitat ===
It occurs in pools, rivers, and lakes.

== Use ==
The tubers are eaten in Malawi.
