= Arab Region (World Association of Girl Guides and Girl Scouts) =

WAGGGS divisional office in the Arab Region

WAGGGS-Arab Region

- Jurisdiction of the WAGGGS-Arab Region
- Arabic: الإقليم العربي بالجمعية العالمية للمرشدات وفتيات الكشافة
- Headquarters: Cairo, Egypt
- Website https://www.wagggs.org/en/our-world/arab-region/

The WAGGGS-Arab Region (Arabic: الإقليم العربي بالجمعية العالمية للمرشدات وفتيات الكشافة) is the divisional office of the World Association of Girl Guides and Girl Scouts, headquartered in Cairo, Egypt. The WAGGGS-Arab Region comprises 17 members of Guiding in Western Asia and North Africa, including Algeria, Bahrain, Egypt, Jordan, Kuwait, Lebanon, Libya, Mauritania, Morocco, Oman, Palestine, Qatar, Saudi Arabia, Sudan, Tunisia, the United Arab Emirates, and Yemen.

This region is the counterpart of the Arab Scout Region of the World Organization of the Scout Movement (WOSM).

== See also ==
- WOSM-Arab Region
