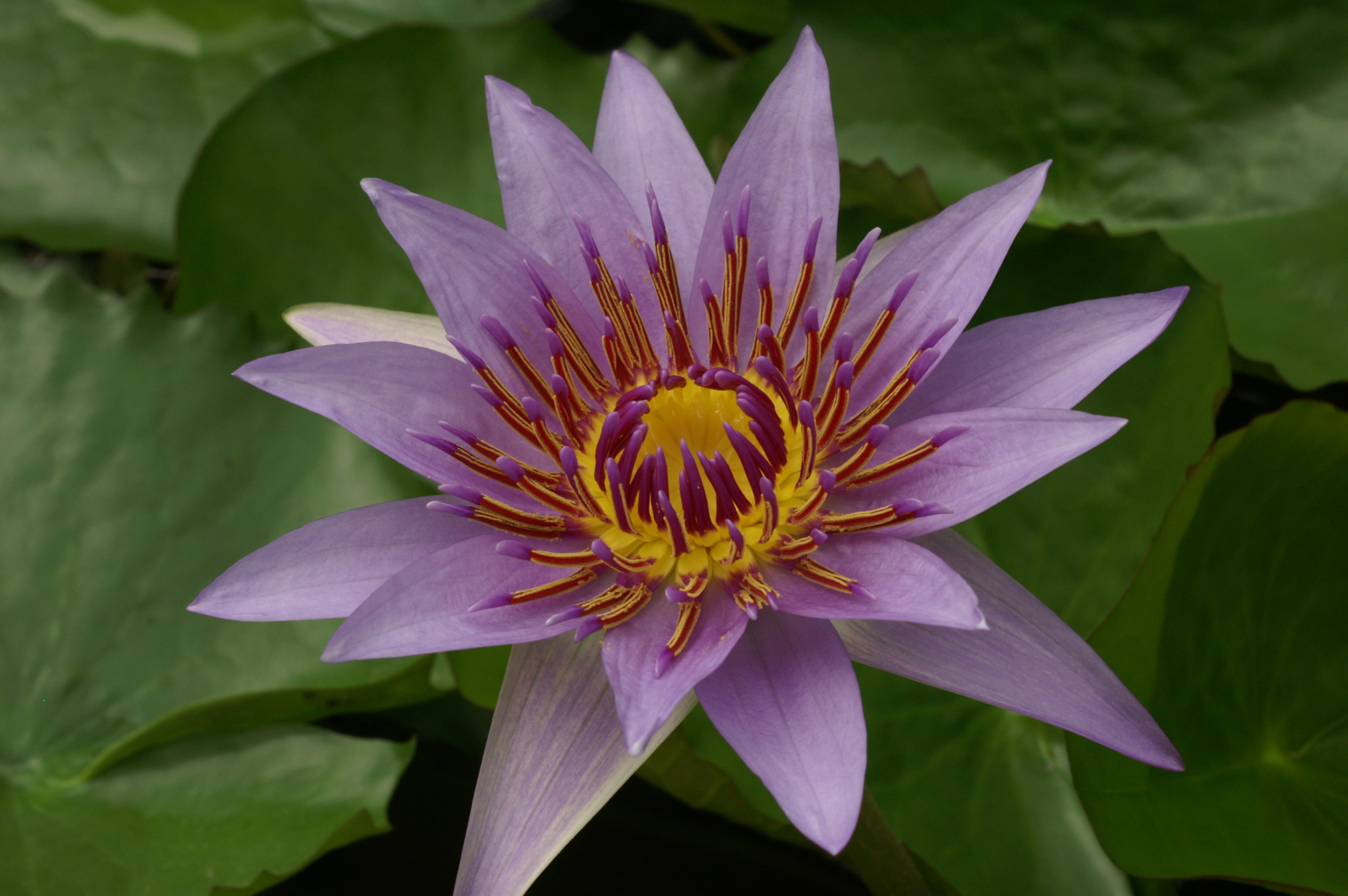

Scientific classification
- Kingdom: Plantae
- Clade: Embryophytes
- Clade: Tracheophytes
- Clade: Spermatophytes
- Clade: Angiosperms
- Order: Nymphaeales
- Family: Nymphaeaceae
- Genus: Nymphaea
- Subgenus: Nymphaea subg. Brachyceras
- Species: N. nouchali
- Variety: N. n. var. zanzibariensis

Trinomial name
- Nymphaea nouchali var. zanzibariensis (Casp.) Verdc.

Synonyms
- List: Castalia zanzibarensis (Casp.) Britton; Leuconymphaea zanzibariensis (Casp.) Kuntze; Nymphaea caerulea subsp. zanzibariensis (Casp.) S.W.L.Jacobs; Nymphaea capensis var. zanzibariensis (Casp.) Conard; Nymphaea stellata var. zanzibariensis (Casp.) Hook.f.; Nymphaea zanzibariensis Casp.; Nymphaea capensis f. rosea Conard; Nymphaea colorata Peter; Nymphaea colorata var. parviflora Peter; Nymphaea grandiflora Peter; Nymphaea polychroma Peter; Nymphaea purpurascens Peter; Nymphaea zanzibariensis var. azurea Lovassy; Nymphaea zanzibariensis var. pallida Peter; Nymphaea zanzibariensis var. rosea Lovassy; Nymphaea zanzibariensis var. rubra Lovassy; Nymphaea zanzibariensis var. violacea Lovassy

= Nymphaea nouchali var. zanzibariensis =

Species of aquatic plant

Nymphaea nouchali var. zanzibariensis (synonym N. colorata) is a variety of the water lily species Nymphaea nouchali Burm.f. naturally found in the region stretching from Southeastern Kenya to Southern Africa, including the Comoros and Madagascar. It has been introduced into Florida, USA.

== Description ==
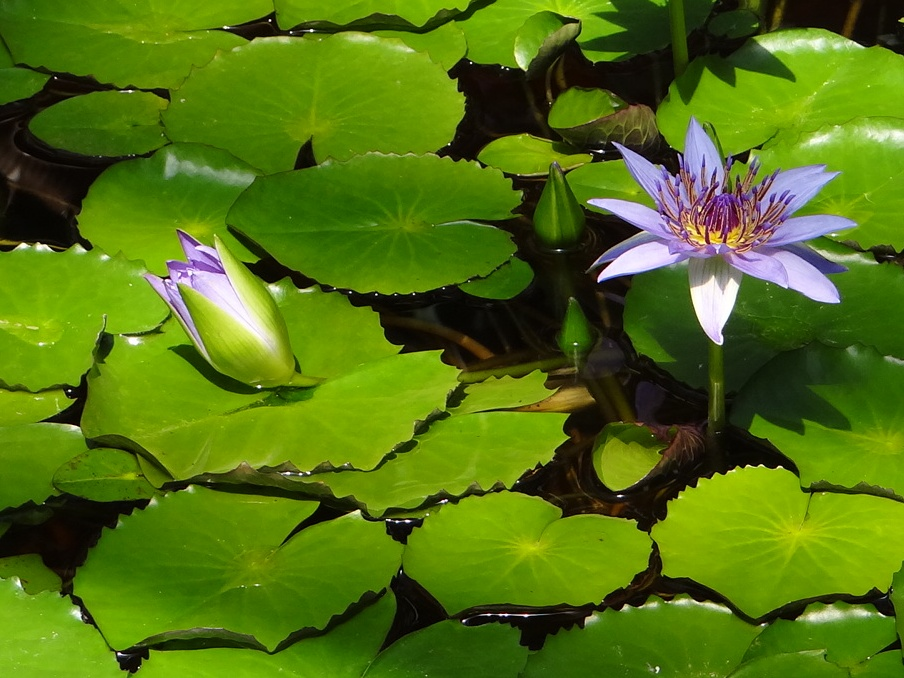
Flowering Nymphaea nouchali var. zanzibariensis

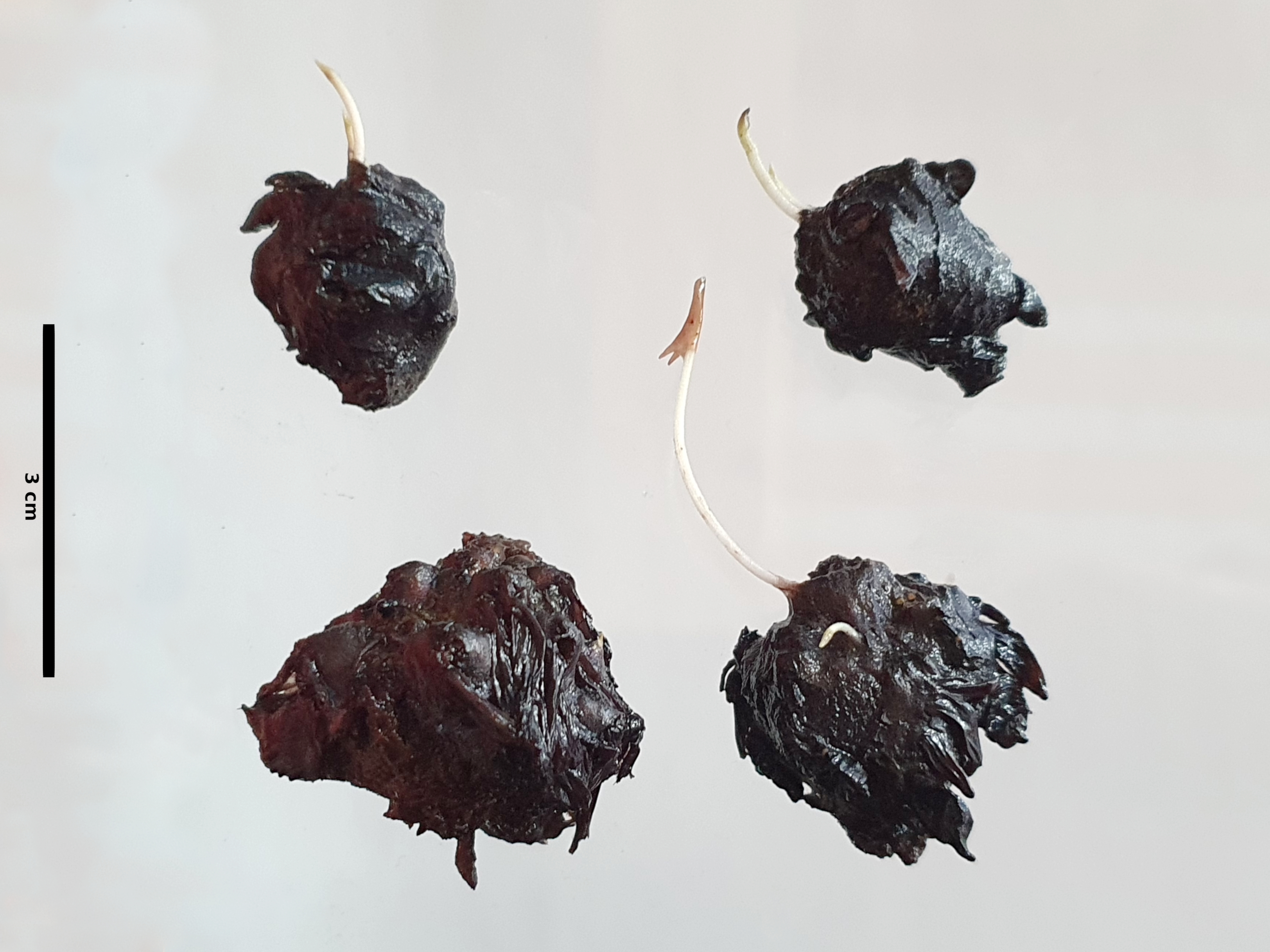
Sprouting Nymphaea nouchali var. zanzibariensis (Casp.) Verdc. rhizomes with scale bar (3 cm) on a white background

It is a day blooming and non-viviparous plant. The flower has dark blue to violet color and consists of 4-5 sepals and 13-15 petals. The flower is cup-like with a diameter of 11–14 cm. The round leaves are green on the top and have a bluish-violet underside. Their size is about 20–23 cm and their spread is 0.9 to 1.8m.

== Cytology ==
The haploid chromosome count is n = 14. As N. colorata, the genome of isolate Beijing-Zhang1983 was sequenced in 2019 by Zhang et al, who reported a genome size of 409 Mb.

== Taxonomy ==
It was first described as Nymphaea zanzibariensis Casp. by Robert Caspary in 1877. Later, it was included in the species Nymphaea nouchali Burm.f. as the variety Nymphaea nouchali var. zanzibariensis (Casp.) Verdc. published by Bernard Verdcourt in 1989.

== Usage ==
It is used as an ornamental flower and has the advantage of having a long flowering period. In addition it even keeps flowering when the temperatures drops to 18 C. It has been used to create several cultivars and hybrids.
