= Mohamed Ali Hafez =

Saudi Arabian scouting executive and journalist (died 2026)

Mohamed Ali Hafiz
- محمد علي حافظ
- Born: 1937 or 1938
- Died: 17 May 2026; Jeddah, Saudi Arabia
- Known for: Served on the World Scout Committee of the World Organization of the Scout Movement

Mohamed Ali Hafiz (Arabic: محمد علي حافظ; died 17 May 2026) was a Saudi Arabian scouting executive and journalist. An official of the Federation for Scouts and Girl Guides, he served on the World Scout Committee of the World Organization of the Scout Movement from 1957 to 1963, and again from 1965 to 1971.

In 1957, an Arab Scout Bureau was established, with Hafiz as first Secretary-General.

In 1963, Hafez was awarded the Bronze Wolf, the only distinction of the World Organization of the Scout Movement, awarded by the World Scout Committee for exceptional services to world Scouting.

Hafez died on 17 May 2026.

== Sources ==
- Dr. László Nagy, 250 Million Scouts, The World Scout Foundation and Dartnell Publishers, 1985, complete list through 1981
- Scouting Round the World, John S. Wilson, first edition, Blandford Press 1959 p. 275, p. 282
