= Kolonialpfadfinder =

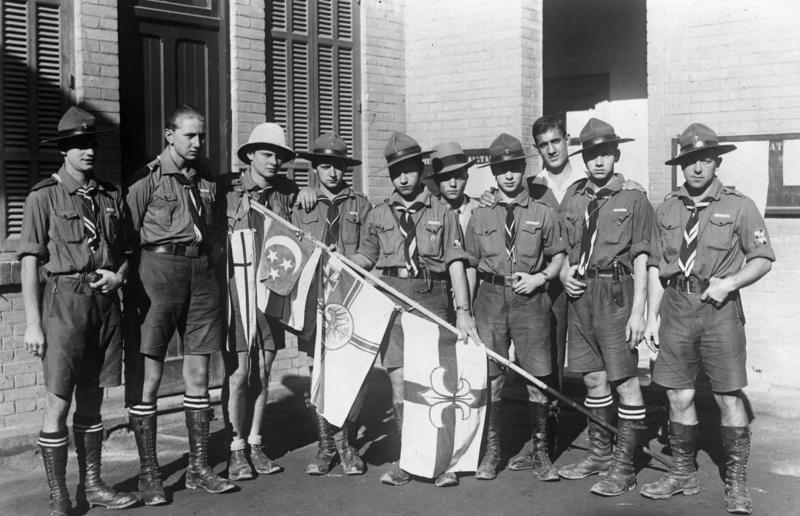
- Kolonialpfadfinder traveling overseas in Cairo (1931)
- Country: Germany

The Kolonialpfadfinder ("Colonial Scouts" in German) were three Scout unions between 1926 and 1933, which were connected by a common history. The aim of their work was the recovery of the German colonies lost after World War I and the training of emigrants. In the middle of 1933 the membership was about 5,000 Scouts.
