= Borj Cédria, Tunisia =

Railway town in Tunisia

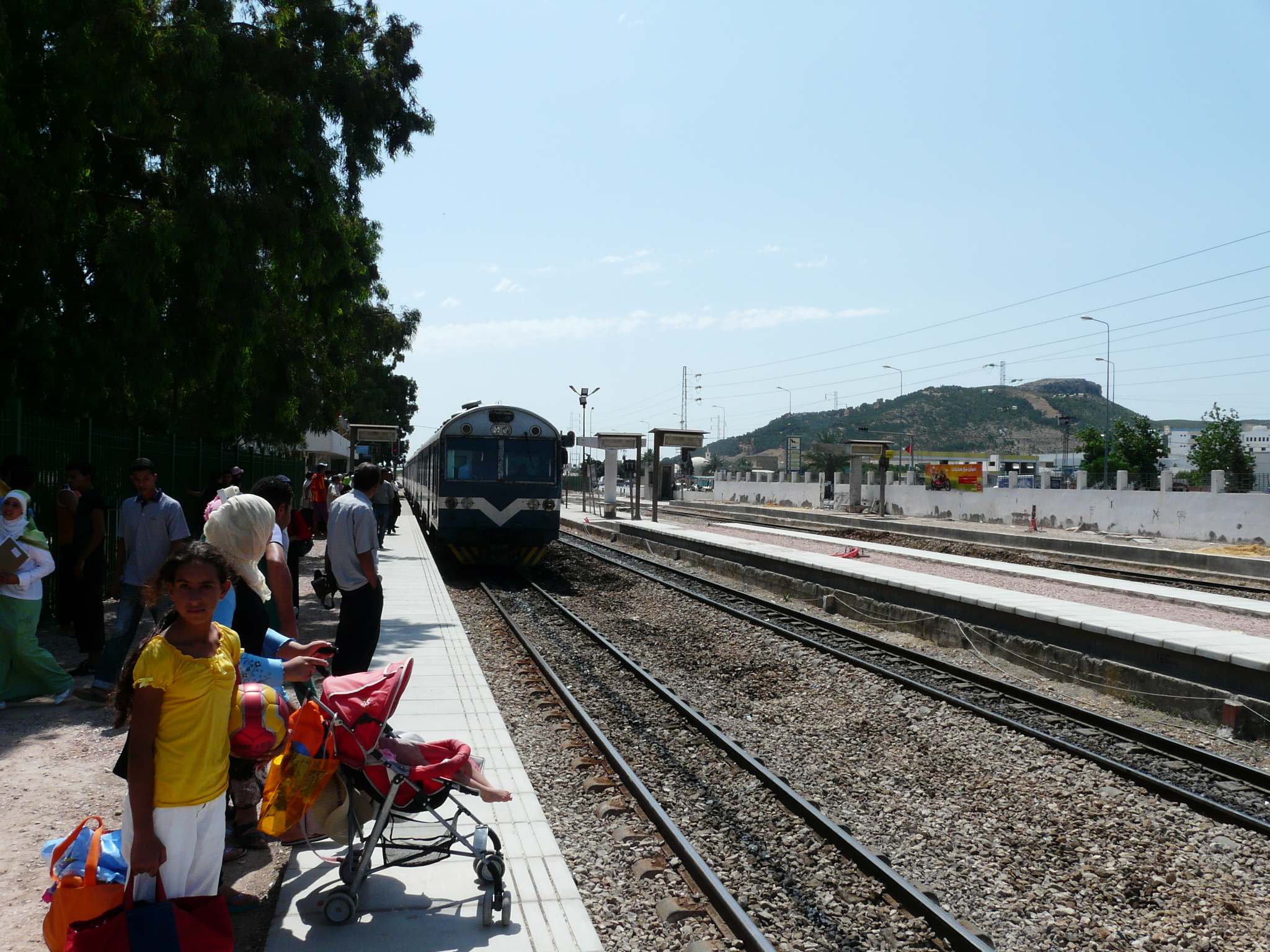
Borj Cédria - panorama

Borj Cédria (برج السدرية) is a railway town in Tunisia located at 36°41′34″N 10°25′39″E on the Oued Gattana river. The population in 2004 was 8974.

There is a large German War cemetery in the town from the Tunisia Campaign of World War II.

== Geography ==
It is part of the suburbs of the Tunisian capital and constitutes the terminus of the southern suburb rail line of Tunis - one of the main suburban railway lines of that city.

It is also at the entrance to the agricultural plain of Mornag, located between the vineyards and the fields of olive trees on the slopes of Djebel Boukornine.

A technopole Estate is being developed from 2006 that is intended to bring together, at a high level of scientific and technological competence, various activities related to research and development and innovative industrial activities.
