= Arab Scout Region (World Organization of the Scout Movement) =

Arab Scout Region Arab Scout Organization

- Map of members or potential members of the Arab Scout Region
- Owner: World Organization of the Scout Movement
- Headquarters: Cairo, Egypt
- Founded: 1954
- Director: Mr. Amr Hamdy Abdelghany
- Website https://www.scout.org/ar

The Arab Scout Region (Arabic: الإقليم الكشفي العربي, romanized: Al'iiqlim Al-Kashfiu Al-Earabiu) also known as the Arab Scout Organization (Arabic: المنظمة الكشفية العربية, romanized: Al-Munazamat Al-Kashfiat Al-Earabia) is the regional support centre of the World Scout Bureau of the World Organization of the Scout Movement, headquartered in Cairo, Egypt. By 1954, Scouting had become so popular in Arab countries that WOSM established the Arab Scout Region in Damascus.

The Region comprises 18 members of Scouting in Western Asia and North Africa, including Algeria, Bahrain, Egypt, Iraq, Jordan, Kuwait, Lebanon, Libya, Mauritania, Morocco, Oman, Palestine, Qatar, Saudi Arabia, Syria, Sudan, Tunisia, the United Arab Emirates, and Yemen.

Scouting is also being developed in Western Sahara with the assistance of Scouts from the Canary Islands.

This region is the counterpart of the Arab Region of the World Association of Girl Guides and Girl Scouts (WAGGGS).

In 2024, Mr. Amr Hamdy Abdelghany of Egypt was named Director of the Arab Region.

== History ==
Libyan Boy Scouts helping in the social services in Benghazi

Scouting in the Arab region started in Syria and Lebanon in 1912. In 1938 the Scouts of Syria invited Arab Scouting leaders to a gathering in Bloudan, with attendees joining from Lebanon, Egypt, Palestine and Iraq.

During the 14th World Scout Conference in Liechtenstein in 1953, Syria offered to host the 8th World Scout Jamboree, but was denied after Israel protested that Israeli Scouts couldn't enter Arab countries. The Arab delegations felt that they wouldn't be able to host such international events and decided to organize on the Pan-Arab level. They prepared a draft in March 1954 that was approved by the Arab League Council on its 21st session, establishing the Arab Scout Organization. The first Arab Scout Conference (and Jamboree) was held at Zabadani, Syria in the summer of 1954, where the Arab Scout Committee was formed.

The second conference and jamboree were held at Abu Qir, Egypt in the summer of 1956. Ali al-Dandachi had done a great deal to encourage Scouting throughout the Middle East, and during his term as a member of the International Committee he visited practically every country in the region. Shortly, an Arab Scout Bureau was established, with Mohamed Ali Hafez of Egypt as Secretary-General. The first gathering (to continue to be held in years when there is no International Conference) was held with six original member states at Ramleh, Egypt.

== Shifting geographical scope ==
Once nascent Scouting receives WOSM recognition, the Arab Scout Region may also be inclusive of Somalia.

Until 2008, the map on the main page for the Region's official website indicated that Ethiopia, Eritrea, Djibouti, and Somalia were within the bounds of the region. Ethiopia is at present a member of the African Region, and the others are awaiting WOSM recognition and final geographic disposition.

The region was originally headquartered in Beirut. The Cairo International Scout Center is a lavish six-floor building next to Cairo International Stadium that welcomes all Scouts, nonScout organizations and individual guests. It hosts both conference areas and hostel quarters.

== Scouting in Western Sahara ==

Western Sahara, a disputed territory home to the Sahraoui Scout Association (Arabic: اتحاد الكشافة الصحراوي), is one of 35 countries where Scouting exists (be it embryonic or widespread) but where there is no National Scout Organization which is yet a member of the World Organization of the Scout Movement. Scouting exists both as part of the Fédération Nationale du Scoutisme Marocain as well as independent groups.

== See also ==
- Arab Region (World Association of Girl Guides and Girl Scouts)
- Arab Scout Jamboree
