= Cluj-Napoca Botanical Garden =

Botanical garden in Cluj-Napoca, Romania

- Alexandru Borza Cluj-Napoca University Botanic Garden
- Grădina Botanică Alexandru Borza a Universității Cluj-Napoca
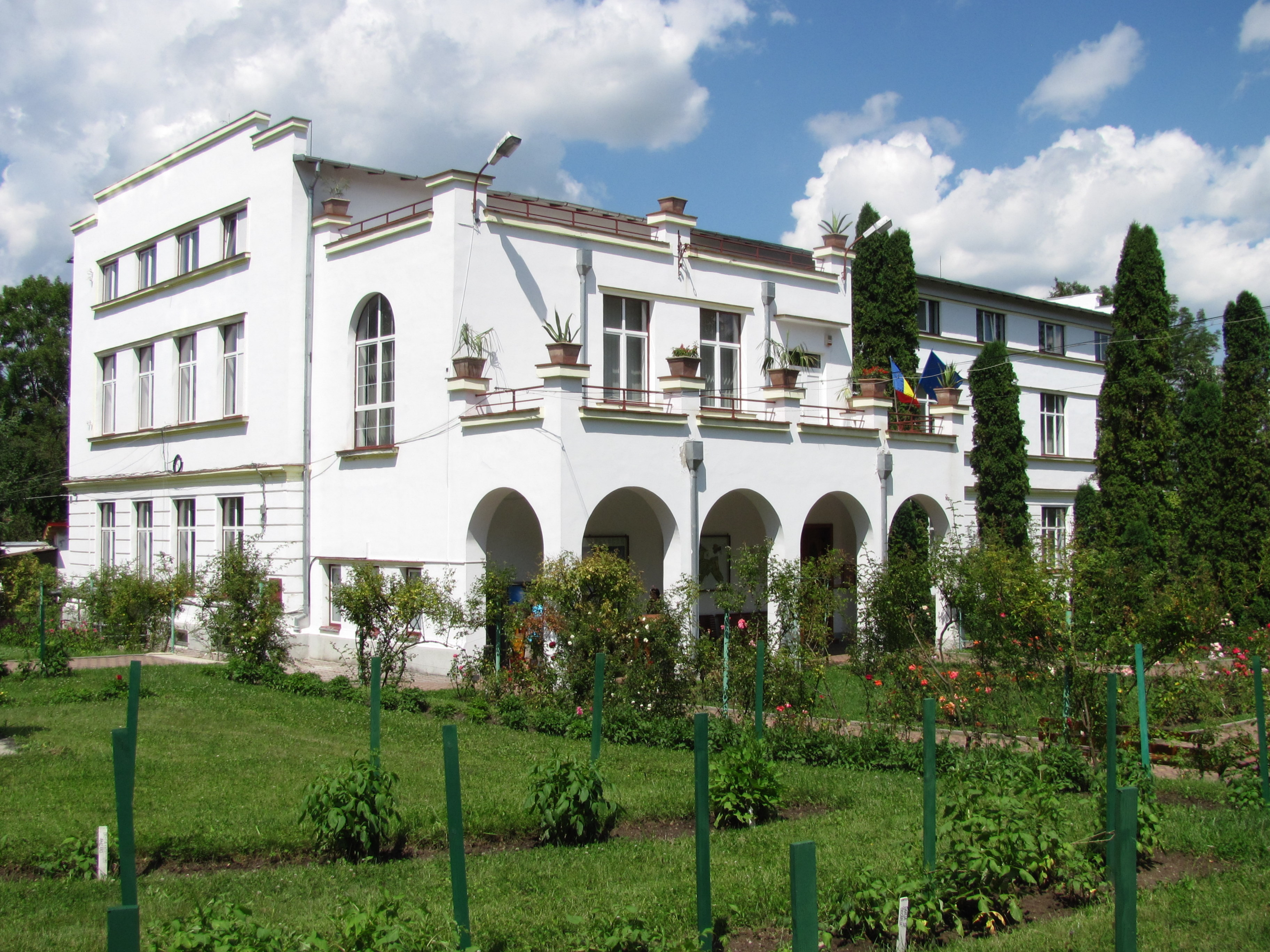
- The Botanical Institute building, which includes the Botanical Museum on the ground floor

- Location within Cluj County Location within Romania
- Interactive map of Cluj-Napoca Botanical Garden
- Type: Botanical garden
- Location: Cluj-Napoca, Romania
- Coordinates: 46.7603°N 23.5870°E
- Area: 14 hectares (35 acres)
- Established: 1872; 154 years ago (precursor); 1919; 107 years ago (modern)
- Founder: Wolfgang Cserey (1872 version); Alexandru Borza (1919 version)
- Designer: August Kanitz
- Operator: Babeș-Bolyai University
- Status: Open
- Species: 10,000+ (plants); 750,000+ (herbarium)
- Website: gradinabotanica.ubbcluj.ro

The Cluj-Napoca Botanical Garden, officially Alexandru Borza Cluj-Napoca University Botanic Garden (Romanian: Grădina Botanică Alexandru Borza a Universității Cluj-Napoca), is a botanical garden located in the south part of Cluj-Napoca, Romania. It was founded in 1872 by Hungarian linguist Sámuel Brassai, known as the "Last Transylvanian Polymath". Its directors in 1905 were Aladár Richter, then Páter Béla, Győrffy István, and then, in 1920, it was taken over by the local university and by Alexandru Borza.

In addition to its role as a tourist destination, the garden also serves as a teaching and research center as part of the Babeș-Bolyai University. In 2010, the Romanian Ministry of Culture and National Patrimony categorized it as a historical monument.

The garden is over 14 hectares (35 acres) in area, with over 10,000 plants found throughout the world. It is divided into ornamental, phytogeographic (geobotanical), systematic (taxonomical), economic, and medicinal sections. Romanian flora and vegetation are represented by plants from the Transylvanian plains, the Carpathian Mountains, Banat, etc.

Among the Botanical Garden's interesting attractions are the Japanese Garden (a garden in Japanese style, with a brook and a Japanese-style house, inspired by the traditional style, gyo-no-niwa, which refers to a traditional type of Japanese garden characterized by a naturalistic, asymmetrical composition that combines water, stones, and vegetation, with a contemplative and symbolic purpose.), the Roman Garden with archeological remains from the Roman colony of Napoca, among them a statue of Ceres, goddess of cereals and bread, alongside cultivated plants that dominate contemporary Romanian agriculture. Jablonovszki Elemér was its head gardener for 45 years.

== History ==
After the establishment of the first universities, the existing herb gardens beside the monasteries were subordinated to them, gradually forming the true botanical gardens, where the botanical sciences with their different branches became study disciplines. Likewise, the case is similar with the Botanical Garden of Alexandru Borza of Cluj-Napoca, and its history has been tied to the Romanian University situated in the capital of Transylvania.

=== Precursors ===
In 1872, with the founding of the Franz Josef University in Cluj, the unique botanical department was attached to a vast garden, the attachment having been orchestrated in said park by Count Mikó, the Ardelean National Museum. This was to be later transformed into a botanical garden. A rich collection of trees and shrubs formed the foundation and the promising beginning of a botanical garden. At the entrance of the park was a four-room building, which served as a Botanical Institute and office. The first director, Prof. Dr. A. Kanitz (1872-1896), failed to organize a solid institution. Despite the funds he disposed of having been of minimal value, he could hardly achieve either a systematically medicinal school or a small greenhouse for tropical plants. Consequently, more than three-quarters of space remained unsolved. In 1882, the Institute of Chemistry was built in the middle of the garden. Count Mikó's House was transformed into a Zoological Museum, rather than being used as part of a Botanical Museum. In 1897, when the second director, Prof. Dr. J. Istvánffi (1897-1901) was instated, the building of the Botanical Institute was demolished, the whole garden thereby losing its original meaning, despite considerable efforts to raise the garden to Western standards. Until 1901 and the instatement of the garden's third director, Prof. Dr. Aladár Richter, who had rich experience and modern views, the Botanical Garden was endowed with a larger greenhouse. This greenhouse was raised in the outside garden, which had been abandoned until then. At that time, Prof. Dr. Aladár Richter was expecting a flourishing era for this cultural institution, when suddenly Prof. Apathy placed her new Zoological Institute in the middle of the botanical garden. Thus, with the Institute of Chemistry and Zoology away from its botanical institute, the Botanical Garden could no longer serve the botanical sciences seriously.

After many efforts, director Aladár Richter managed to convince the government of the need for measures to save the garden. In 1910–1912, as compensation for the museum garden, a great land for a new botanical garden was purchased. The chosen territory was corrugated and rugged, rendering it suitable for different cultures and rare landscapes. It was endowed with separate buildings for the director, staff and household.

Professor Richter retired and thus did not personally handle the arrangement of this garden. For lack of funds and initiative, Gyorffy (1913-1919) also did not handle the arrangement, but rather cultivated fruits and vegetables for hospitals and housed the Hungarian refugees in 1916 during World War I. The new Romanian administration was tasked with transforming the orchard of existing fruit trees into a true botanical garden.

=== Foundation and growth ===
After the Great Union, a conflict emerged between the newly enlarged Kingdom of Romania and staff at the University of Cluj, which refused to recognise the authority of the Romanian state. Consequently, the university's assets were nationalised and on 12 May 1919 a committee of 14 Transylvanian specialists was appointed to administer these assets. In the area of biology this task fell to Alexandru Borza. In 1920, Borza and Kornél Gürtler devised a plan for a botanical garden.

In 1920 two neighbouring parcels separated by a creek are bought and the landscaping work begins. The marshy land hosting the parcels is drained and a diverse array of seeds are planted.

In 1923 a dam with a reservoir and a water tower are built. The water tower is accessible to the public and doubles as a panoramic viewing platform overlooking the garden. The rocky sections are landscaped for Mediterranean flora and a Japanese garden is constructed.

In 1924 a greenhouse is set up to host palm trees. New paths through the garden are constructed and paved.

The official inauguration of the garden takes place on 25 June 1925.

A series of renovation and expansion works take place throughout the 1960s. The most notable are six new greenhouses, paving the garden's main alleys, and consolidation works on the central lake's foundation.

In 1960, the garden's new greenhouses with six compartments were put into use. Between 1963 and 1964, the main paths of the garden were paved, the lake in the Japanese Garden was reinforced, and the wooden fence was replaced with a new concrete one. After 1986, a series of works were carried out to restore the bottom of the Japanese Garden lake and its drainage system.The works have not yet been completed due to a lack of funds. From 1997 to the present, a program has been initiated to repair the greenhouse complexes at the Botanical Institute, pave paths, and modernize public lighting. Some of the paths have had their asphalt pavement replaced with new, more aesthetically pleasing pavement.

== Garden sections ==
In order to create the most favorable conditions for the plants, the garden space was divided into several sectors:

- The ornamental sector - here, dozens of species of several hundred woody and herbaceous plants are cultivated, delighting visitors throughout the year in areas such as the Japanese Garden, the Rosarium, and the Mediterranean Garden;
- The phytogeographical sector contains a collection of plants arranged according to their natural associations;
- The systematic sector - a large number of species grouped by family, which in turn are arranged by order and class, from a phylogenetic point of view;
- The economic sector consists of a series of plants cultivated for their industrial/economic usefulness, such as the coconut or oil palm;
- The medicinal sector - plants known for their medical and healing properties.

== Greenhouses ==
The greenhouse complex consists of two groups with a total of six greenhouses (covering a total area of over 3,500 m²) where equatorial and tropical plants are cultivated:

- Aquatic plant greenhouse – there you can admire the Amazonian lotus with leaves over 1.5 m in diameter;
- Palm tree greenhouse – there are over 80 species of decorative and industrial palm trees (coconut, oil palms), brought from Japan, Australia, Asia, and the Canary Islands;
- Greenhouse with Australian and Mediterranean vegetation – there are various species of ficus, ferns;
- Greenhouse with orchids and ferns;
- Greenhouse with bromeliads;
- Greenhouse with succulent plants.

== The Roman Garden ==
The Roman Garden, or Pliniu's Garden, is arranged around the statue of Ceres, the Roman goddess of agriculture. This place displays a series of archaeological pieces discovered in the Roman city of Napoca, including two Roman sarcophagi. There is also a collection of plants that were once found in Roman gardens.

== The Japanese Garden ==
The Japanese Garden is arranged in the traditional gyo-no-niwa style and includes landscape elements specific to Japan, arranged in a traditional Japanese setting: an artificial lake, in the middle of which there is a small island connected to the edges of the lake on one side by a curved Japanese bridge at the end of which there is a sacred Japanese gate, and on the opposite side there is a stone footbridge. Four stone lanterns are arranged around the lake, and the area is landscaped with plants brought from the Far East.

== Image Gallery ==
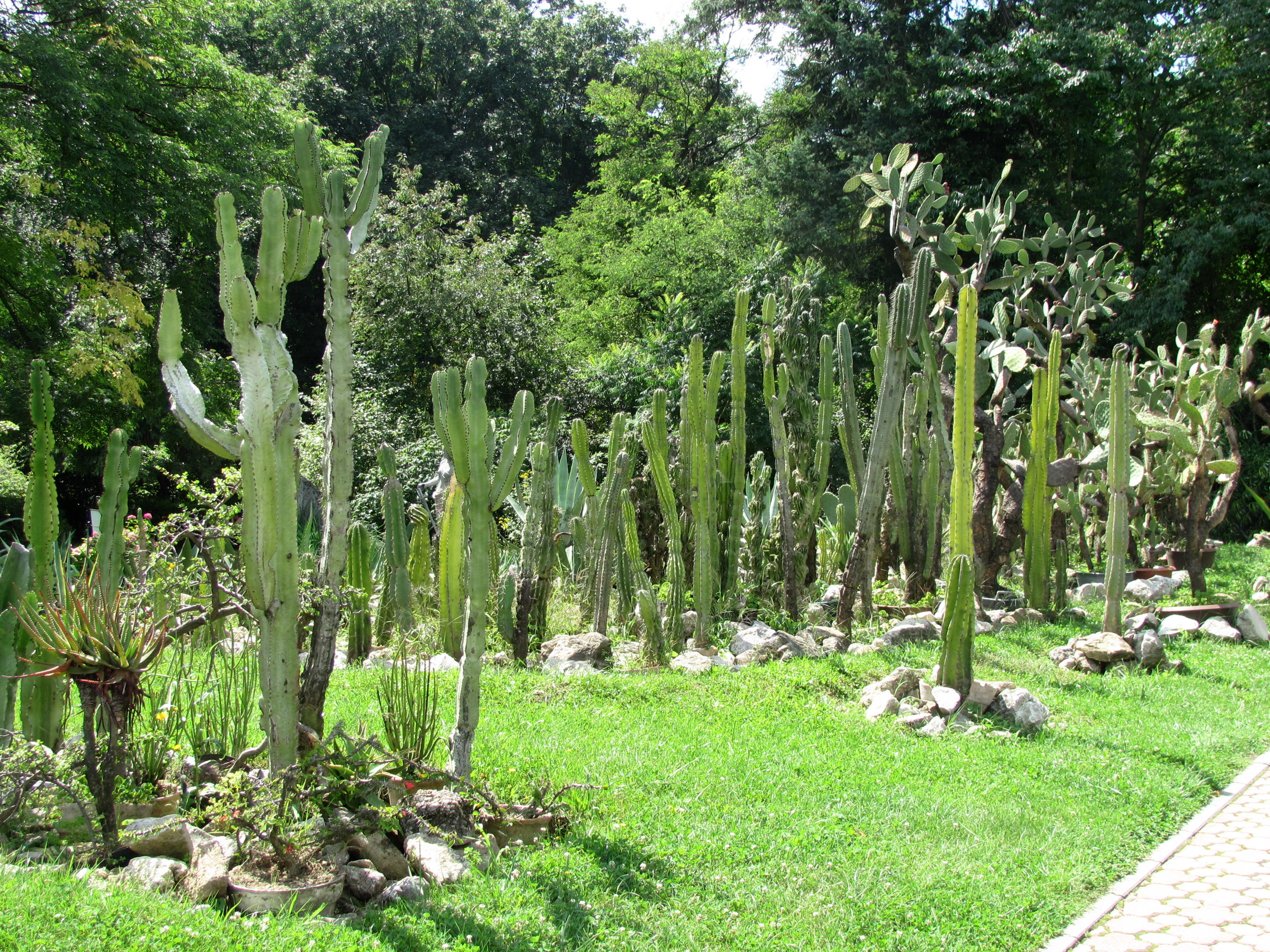
The central alley

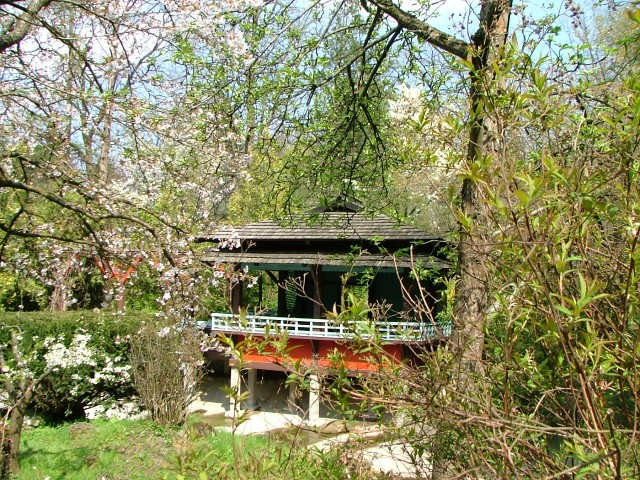
The Japanese Garden

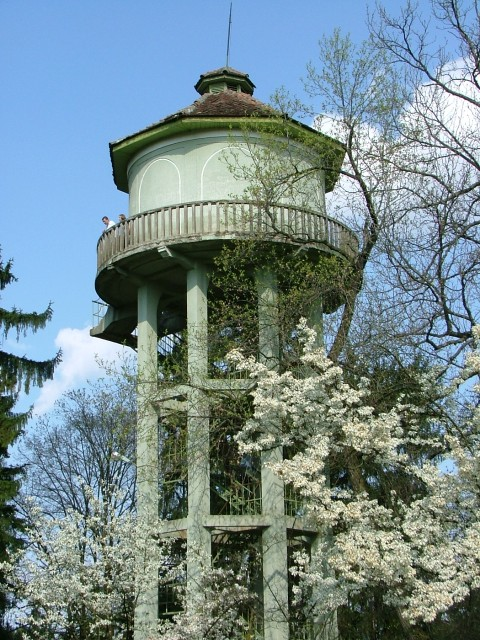
Water Tower

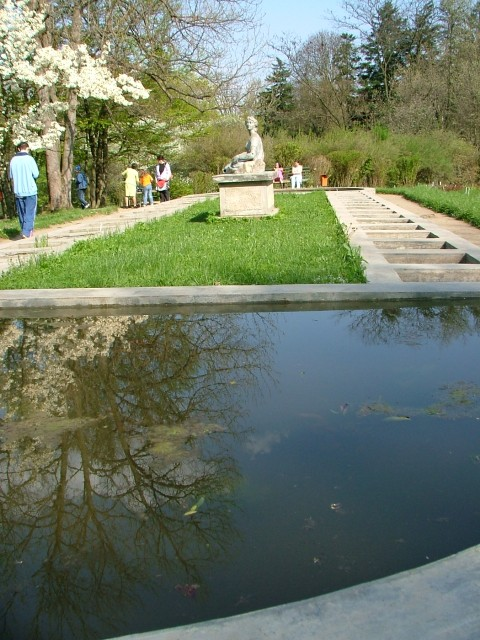
The pools built near the Water Tower

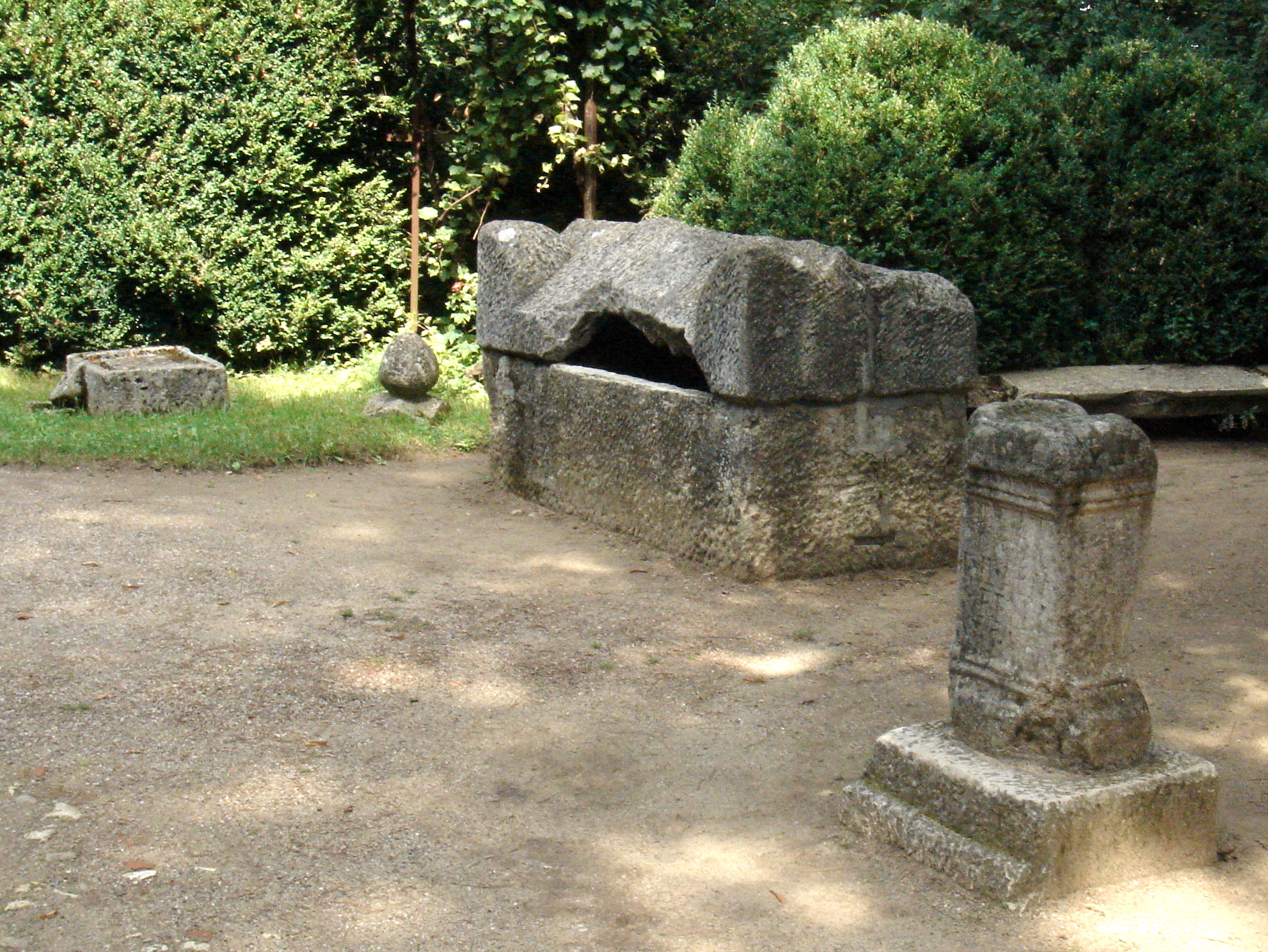
Roman ruins in the Roman Garden

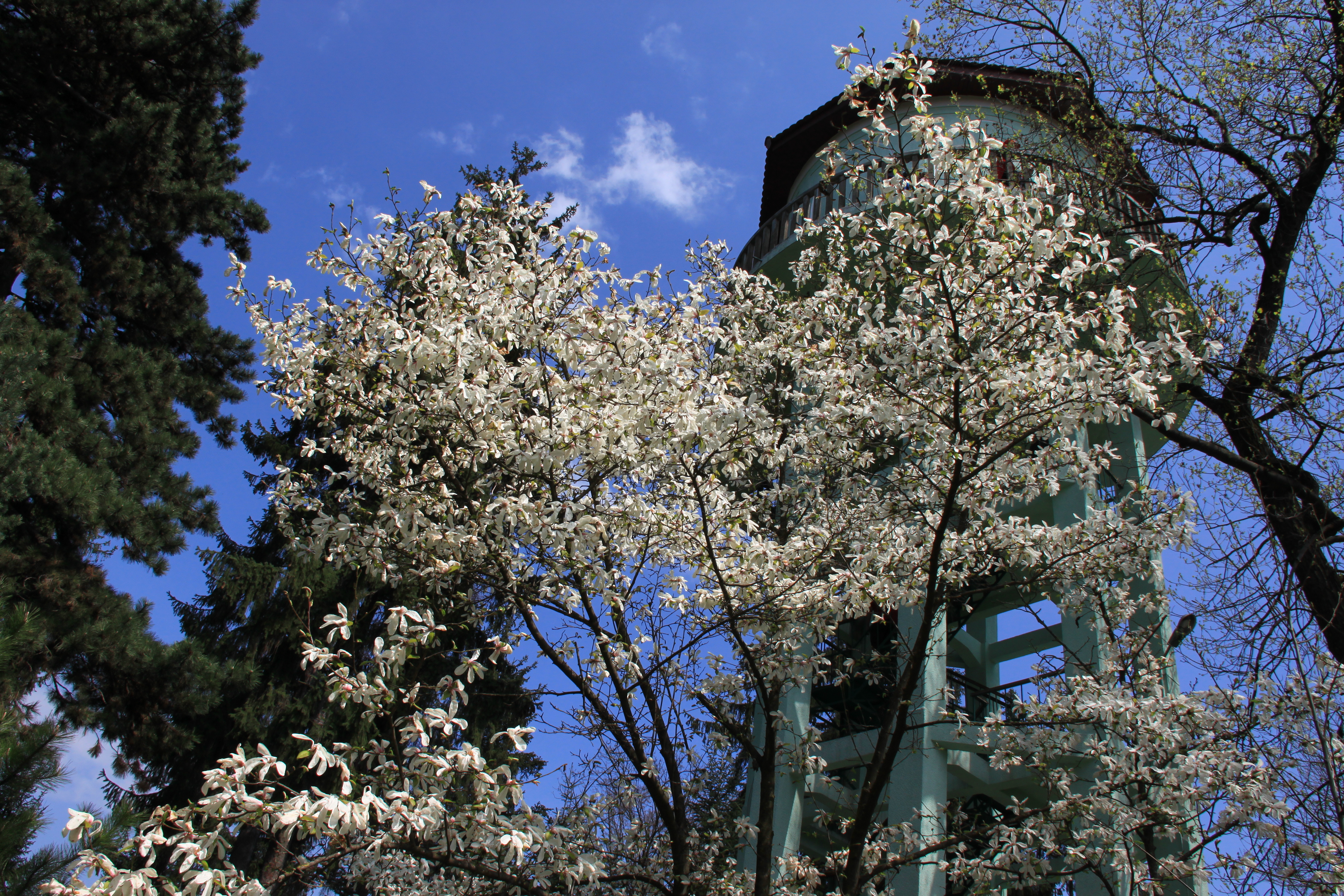
Flowering trees near the Water Tower

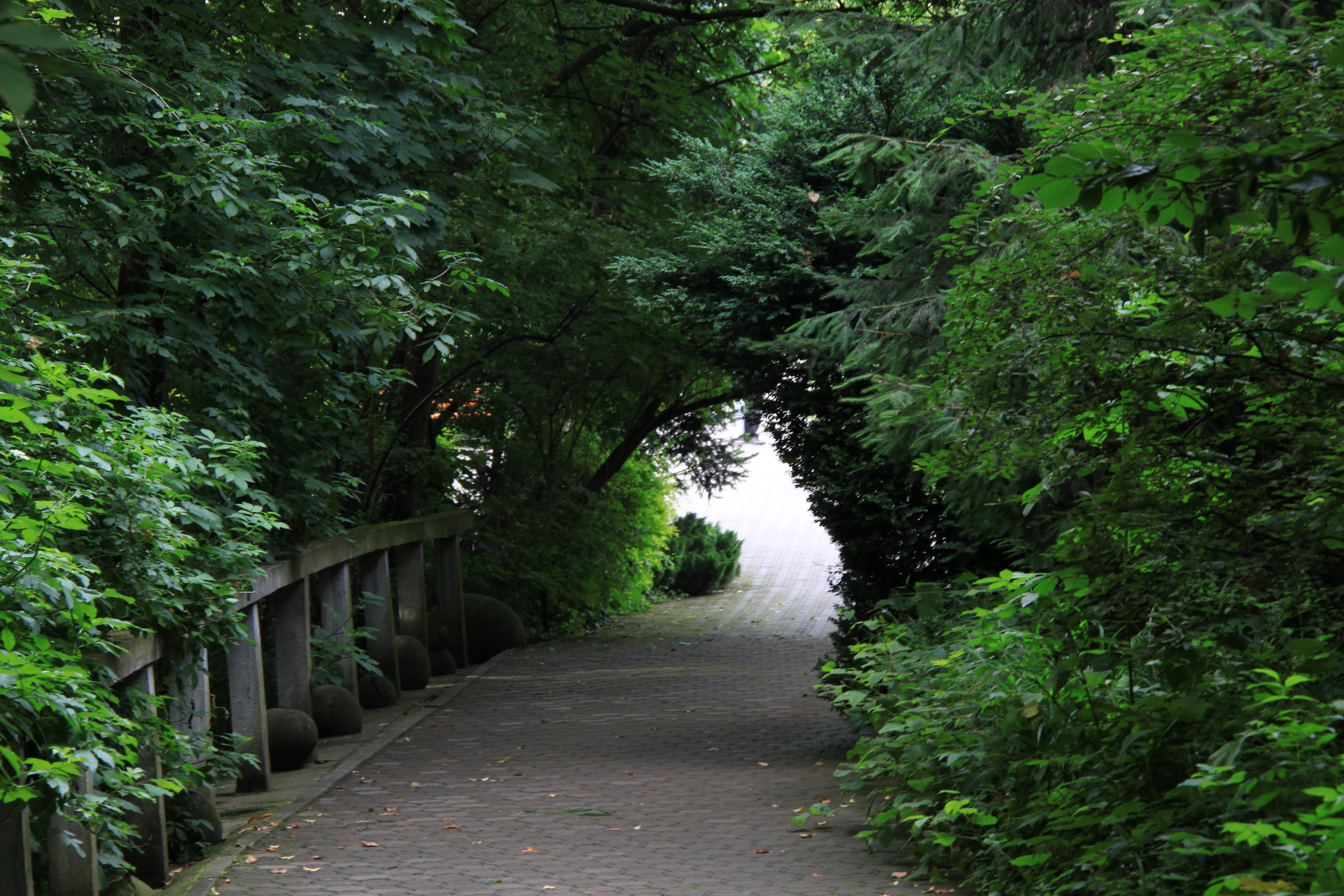
Alley in the Botanical Garden

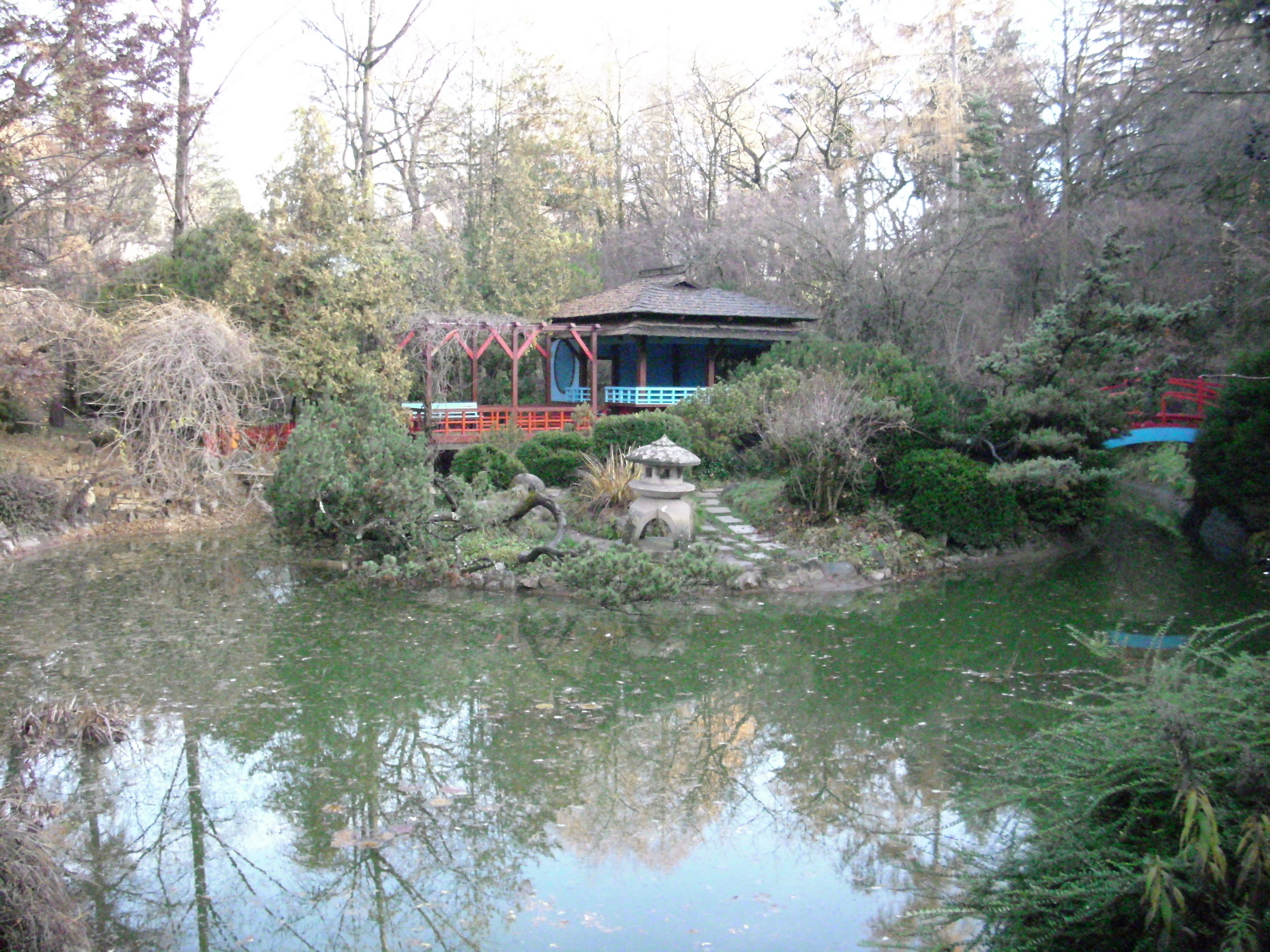
The Japanese Garden

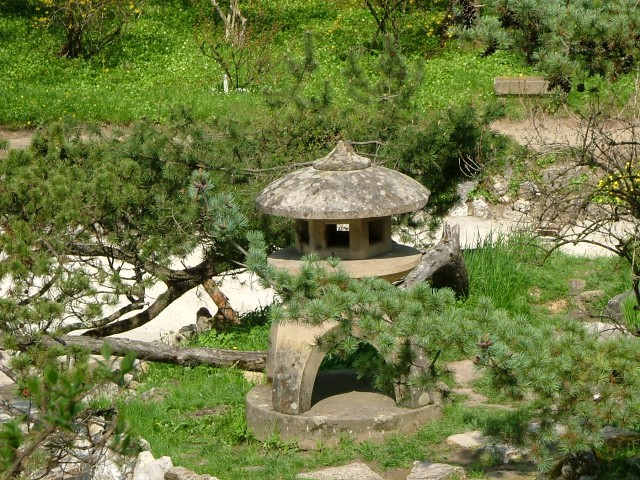
Stone lantern from the Japanese Garden

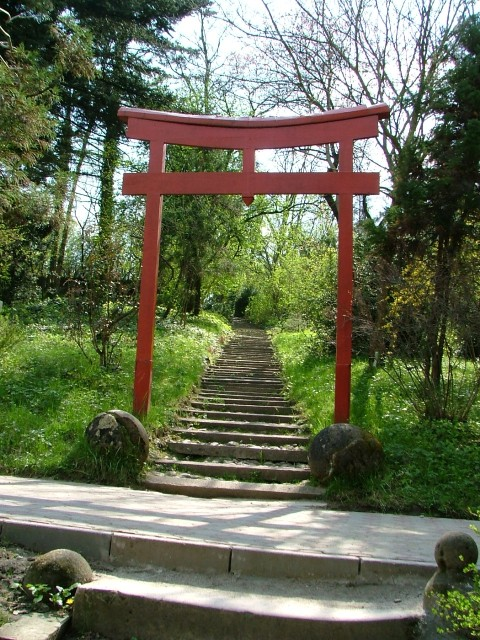
The sacred gate of the Japanese Garden

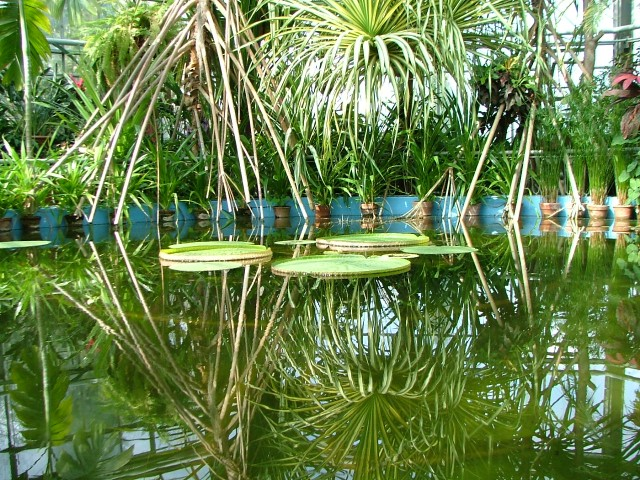
Aquatic Plant Greenhouse

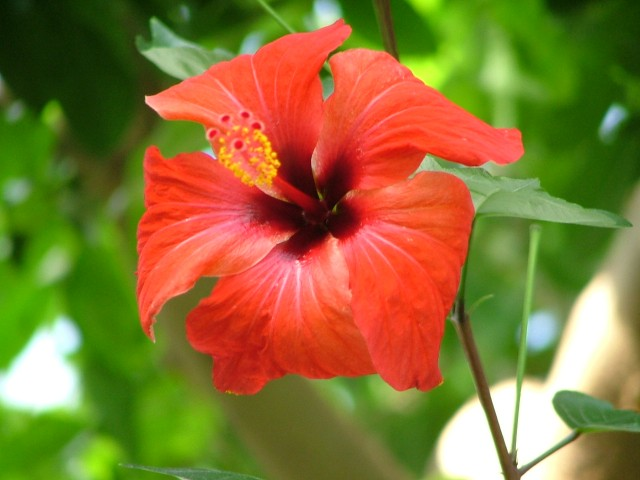
Flowers grown in greenhouses
