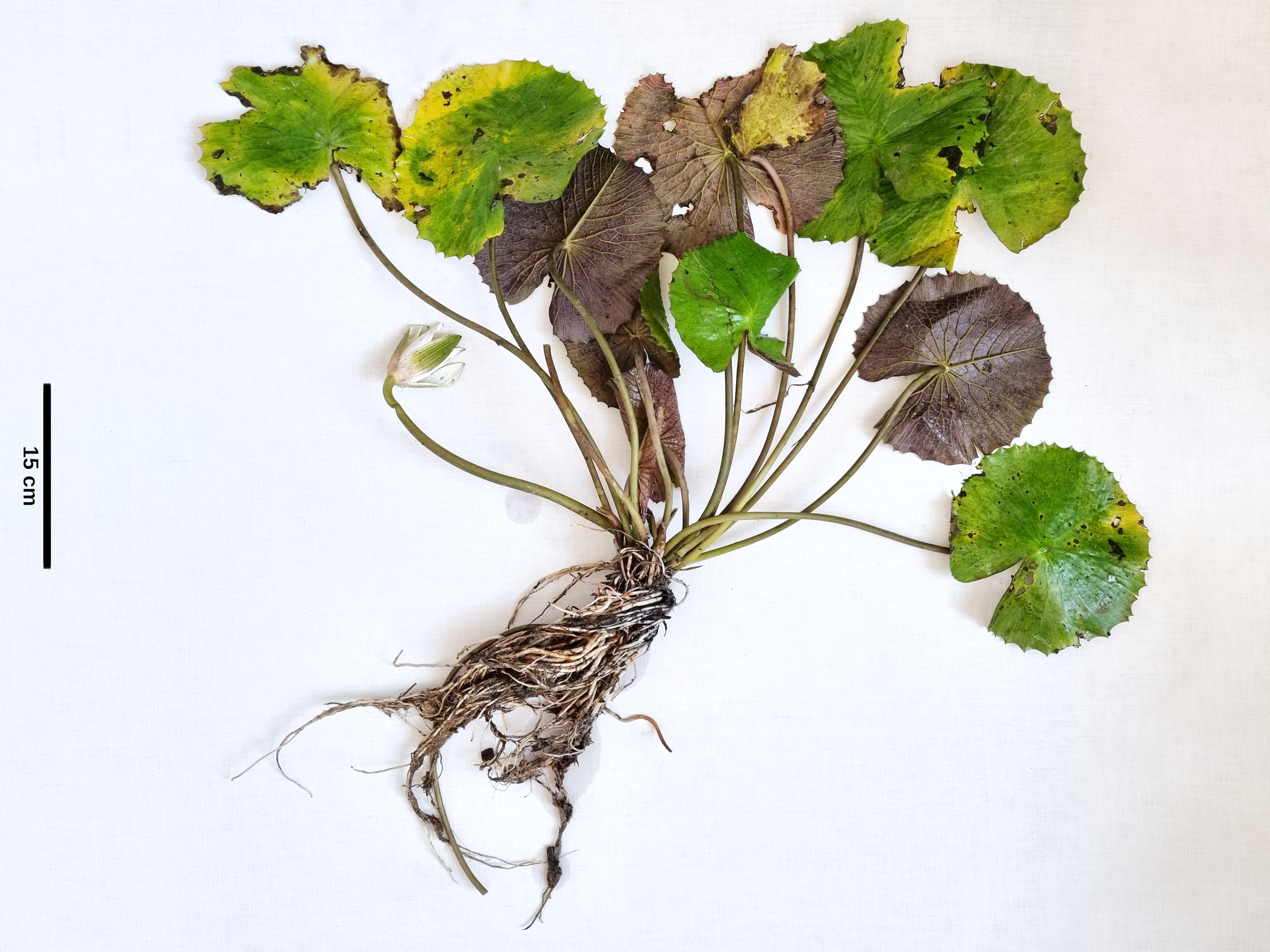
- Nymphaea lotus var. thermalis with scale bar (15 cm)

Scientific classification
- Kingdom: Plantae
- Clade: Tracheophytes
- Clade: Angiosperms
- Order: Nymphaeales
- Family: Nymphaeaceae
- Genus: Nymphaea
- Species: N. lotus
- Variety: N. l. var. thermalis

Trinomial name
- Nymphaea lotus var. thermalis (DC.) Tuzson
- It is endemic to Romania

Synonyms
- Castalia thermalis (DC.) Simonk.; Nymphaea thermalis DC.

= Nymphaea lotus var. thermalis =

Variety of water lily

Nymphaea lotus var. thermalis is a variety of Nymphaea lotus native to Romania.

== Description ==
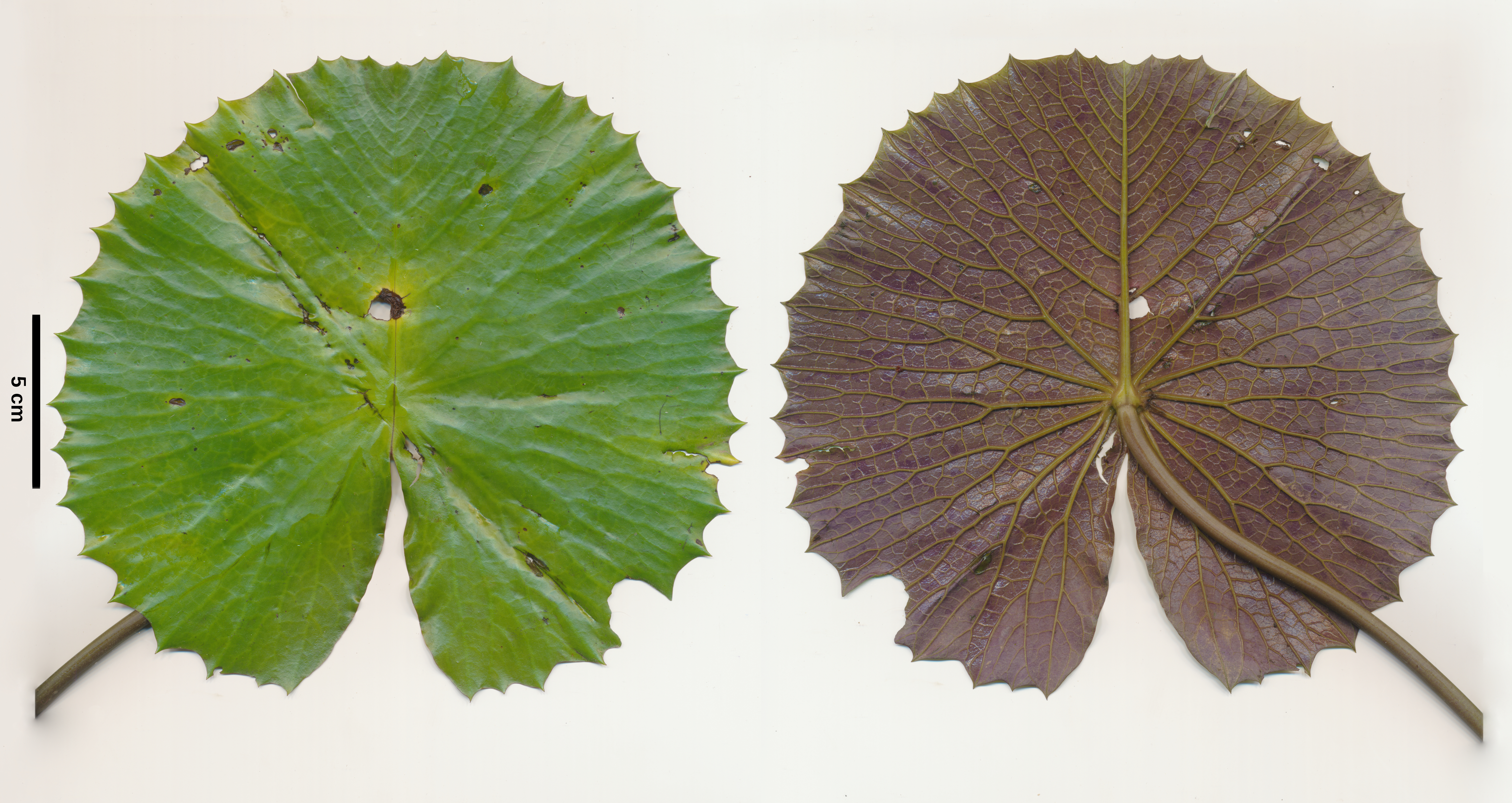
Nymphaea lotus var. thermalis floating leaf with scale bar (5 cm) on a white background

=== Vegetative characteristics ===
Nymphaea lotus var. thermalis is an aquatic, perennial, rhizomatous plant. The glabrous, or pubescent, sagittate, ovate, or circular leaves have a dentate margin. The adaxial leaf surface is dark green, and the abaxial leaf surface with prominent ribs is more pale and does not have spotting.

=== Generative characteristics ===
The nocturnal, fragrant, white to pink, 12–15 cm wide flowers extend 10–12 cm over the water surface. The flowers have four sepals, 19–20 white petals along with yellow anthers and stamens. The androecium consists of 65–80 stamens. The gynoecium consists of 24–36 carpels. The fleshy, green to brown fruit bears very numerous seeds. The grey, ellipsoid, glabrous seeds with 8–14 ribs are 1.5–1.8 mm long, and 1.1–1.3 mm wide.

== Taxonomy ==
It was first described as Nymphaea thermalis DC. by Augustin Pyramus de Candolle in 1821. Later, it was reduced from the species status to the variety Nymphaea lotus var. thermalis (DC.) Tuzson in 1907. In the following year another name, Castalia thermalis (DC.) Simonk., was published. The accepted name is Nymphaea lotus var. thermalis (DC.) Tuzson. It is placed in the subgenus Nymphaea subg. Lotos.

=== Disputation of taxonomic status ===
Some sources believe it is a relict, which had survived the ice age due to warm water from the thermal spring in Romania. DNA analyses came to the conclusion, that Nymphaea lotus var. thermalis is not distinct from Nymphaea lotus and cannot be a relict population. It was primarily separated for geographical reasons. It has been described as hardly distinct. It is said to differ in having glabrous leaves, yet other sources state there is no difference in the leaf pubescence. The issue of the leaf pubescence was deemed irrelevant, when it was discovered that both glabrous and pubescent leaves are present in individuals of Nymphaea lotus and Nymphaea lotus var. thermalis. It has also been claimed that it differs in the dentation of the leaf margin, but other authors have denied these claims. Likewise, it was refuted that Nymphaea lotus were not heterophyllous, which was claimed to be a distinguishing characteristic. Furthermore, it was claimed that Nymphaea lotus var. thermalis flowers earlier than Nymphaea lotus. The petioles, peduncles, and calyx is said to be glabrous in Nymphaea lotus var. thermalis, supposedly unlike those of Nymphaea lotus. Nymphaea lotus var. thermalis (DC.) Tuzson is treated as a synonym of Nymphaea lotus L. by some sources, however it is still accepted by others.

== Habitat ==
Nymphaea lotus var. thermalis is endemic to the thermal water of the Peţa River, Sânmartin, Bihor County, Romania. The area is protected as a nature reserve (51.0 hectares (126 acres) in size) and consists of a rivulet along with three ponds. The water has a roughly constant temperature of around 30 °C whilst the site has an average air temperature of 10–11 °C. The thermal waters have been recorded as early as 1211, but it was only in 1799 that the first record of N. lotus was made, by Pál Kitaibel. Janos Tuzson proposed in 1907 that this population's unusual location could be explained by the persistent heat provided by the thermal springs could have sustained the population at a pre-ice age time when the plant would have been spreading across the warmer regions of Europe; this theory was corroborated by additional evidence provided by the identification of other endemic species.

== Conservation ==
Alexandru Borza was the Government minister in charge of education (and also a botanist) who made the first push for legal protection and recognition of Nymphaea lotus var. thermalis – in 1932, the Cabinet of Romania declared the rivulet a nature reserve and the plant a "national monument". Conservation action with the intent to preserve this population has been undertaken for many years (since at least 1940) – including the management of invasive species – and the plant has been included in recent water management legislation. Whilst not held in any Romanian botanical gardens, Nymphaea lotus var. thermalis is grown at Royal Botanic Gardens Kew and at the botanic garden of Bonn University. It is in imminent danger of extinction.
