= Pál Kitaibel =

Hungarian botanist

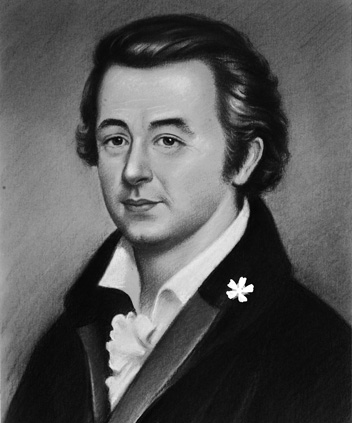
Pál Kitaibel (1757–1817)

Pál Kitaibel (3 February 1757 – 13 December 1817) was a Hungarian botanist and chemist.

He was born at Nagymarton (today Mattersburg, Austria) and studied botany and chemistry at the University of Buda. In 1794 he became Professor and taught these subjects at Pest. As well as studying the flora and hydrography of Hungary, in 1789 he discovered the element tellurium, but later gave the credit to Franz-Joseph Müller von Reichenstein (1740–1825) who had actually discovered it in 1782.

Together with Franz de Paula Adam von Waldstein (1759–1823), he wrote Descriptiones et icones plantarum rariorum Hungariae ("Descriptions and pictures of the rare plants of Hungary"; M. A. Schmidt, Vienna, three volumes, 1802–1812). In this work he made the first description of Nymphaea lotus var. thermalis.

He died in 1817 at Pest.

The genus Kitaibelia of mallows was named after him by Carl Ludwig von Willdenow.

Species named after him:

- Ablepharus kitaibelii
- Cardamine kitaibelii
- Kitaibela vitifolia
- Knautia kitaibelii
- Aquilegia kitaibelii

== Bibliography ==
- Books by and about Paul Kitaibel on Worldcat.
