= Myricitrin =

- Myricitrin structure

Names
- IUPAC name 3′,4′,5,5′,7-Pentahydroxy-3-(α-L-rhamnopyranosyloxy)flavone
- Systematic IUPAC name 5,7-Dihydroxy-3-{[(2S,3R,4R,5R,6S)-3,4,5-trihydroxy-6-methyloxan-2-yl]oxy}-2-(3,4,5-trihydroxyphenyl)-4H-1-benzopyran-4-one
- Other names Myricitroside; Myricitrine; Myricetrin; Myricetol 3-rhamnoside Myricetin 3-O-rhamnoside; Myricetin 3-rhamnoside

Identifiers
CAS Number	17912-87-7
3D model (JSmol)	Interactive image
ChEBI	CHEBI:70082
ChEMBL	ChEMBL454576
ChemSpider	4444992
ECHA InfoCard	100.038.036
EC Number	241-856-7
KEGG	C10108
PubChem CID	5281673
UNII	5Z0ZO61WPJ
CompTox Dashboard (EPA)	DTXSID40170771
- InChI: InChI=1S/C21H20O12/c1-6-14(26)17(29)18(30)21(31-6)33-20-16(28)13-9(23)4-8(22)5-12(13)32-19(20)7-2-10(24)15(27)11(25)3-7/h2-6,14,17-18,21-27,29-30H,1H3/t6-,14-,17+,18+,21-/m0/s1 Key: DCYOADKBABEMIQ-OWMUPTOHSA-N
- SMILES: CC1C(C(C(C(O1)OC2=C(OC3=CC(=CC(=C3C2=O)O)O)C4=CC(=C(C(=C4)O)O)O)O)O)O

Properties
Chemical formula	C_{21}H_{20}O_{12}
Molar mass	464.37 g/mol
Density	1.882 g/mL
- Except where otherwise noted, data are given for materials in their standard state (at 25 °C [77 °F], 100 kPa). verify (what is ?) Infobox references

Myricitrin is a plant compound, the 3-O-α-L-rhamnopyranoside of myricetin.

== Occurrences ==
It can be isolated from the root bark of Myrica cerifera (bayberry, a small tree native to North America), in Myrica esculenta, in Nymphaea lotus and N. odorata, in Chrysobalanus icaco and in Polygonum aviculare.

Myricitrin is used by several beetle species in their communication system. These include Plagioderma versicolora, Agelastica coerulea, Atrachya menetrisi, Altica nipponica, Altica oleracea, Gastrolina depressa.

== Pharmacology ==
Myricitrin is a nitric oxide and protein kinase C inhibitor and exhibits antipsychotic-like and anxiolytic-like effects in animal models of psychosis and anxiety respectively.
