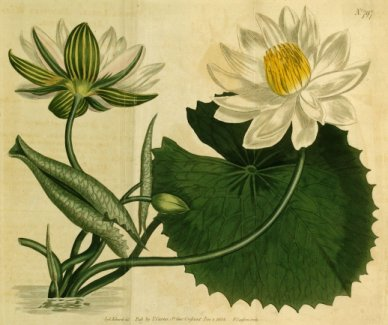

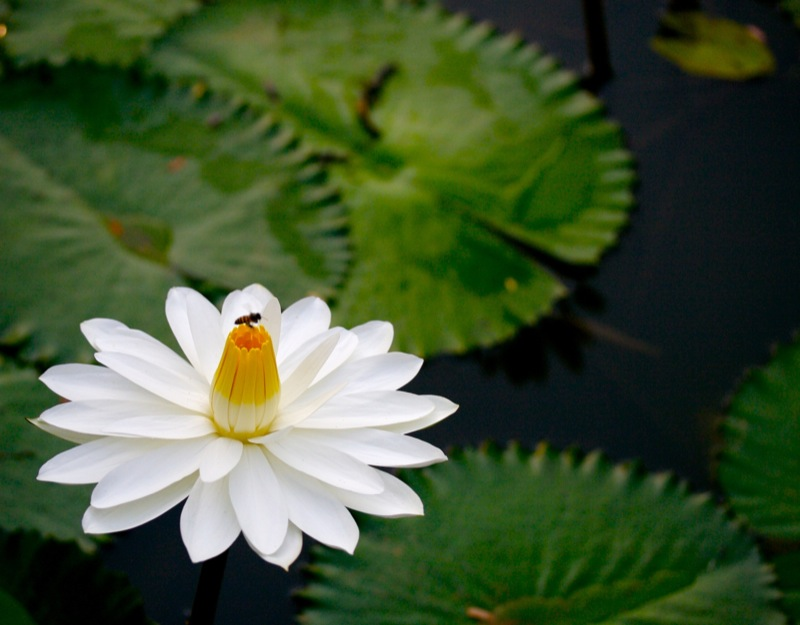

Conservation status
- Least Concern (IUCN 3.1)

Scientific classification
- Kingdom: Plantae
- Clade: Embryophytes
- Clade: Tracheophytes
- Clade: Angiosperms
- Order: Nymphaeales
- Family: Nymphaeaceae
- Genus: Nymphaea
- Subgenus: Nymphaea subg. Lotos
- Species: N. lotus

Binomial name
- Nymphaea lotus L.

Varieties
- Nymphaea lotus var. lotus; Nymphaea lotus var. thermalis (DC.) Tuzson

Synonyms
- Nymphaea dentata Schumach. Nymphaea zenkeri Gilg. Nymphaea liberiensis A.Chevalier

= Nymphaea lotus =

Species of water lily

Nymphaea lotus, the white Egyptian lotus, tiger lotus, white lotus, or Egyptian water-lily, is a flowering plant of the family Nymphaeaceae.

== Description ==
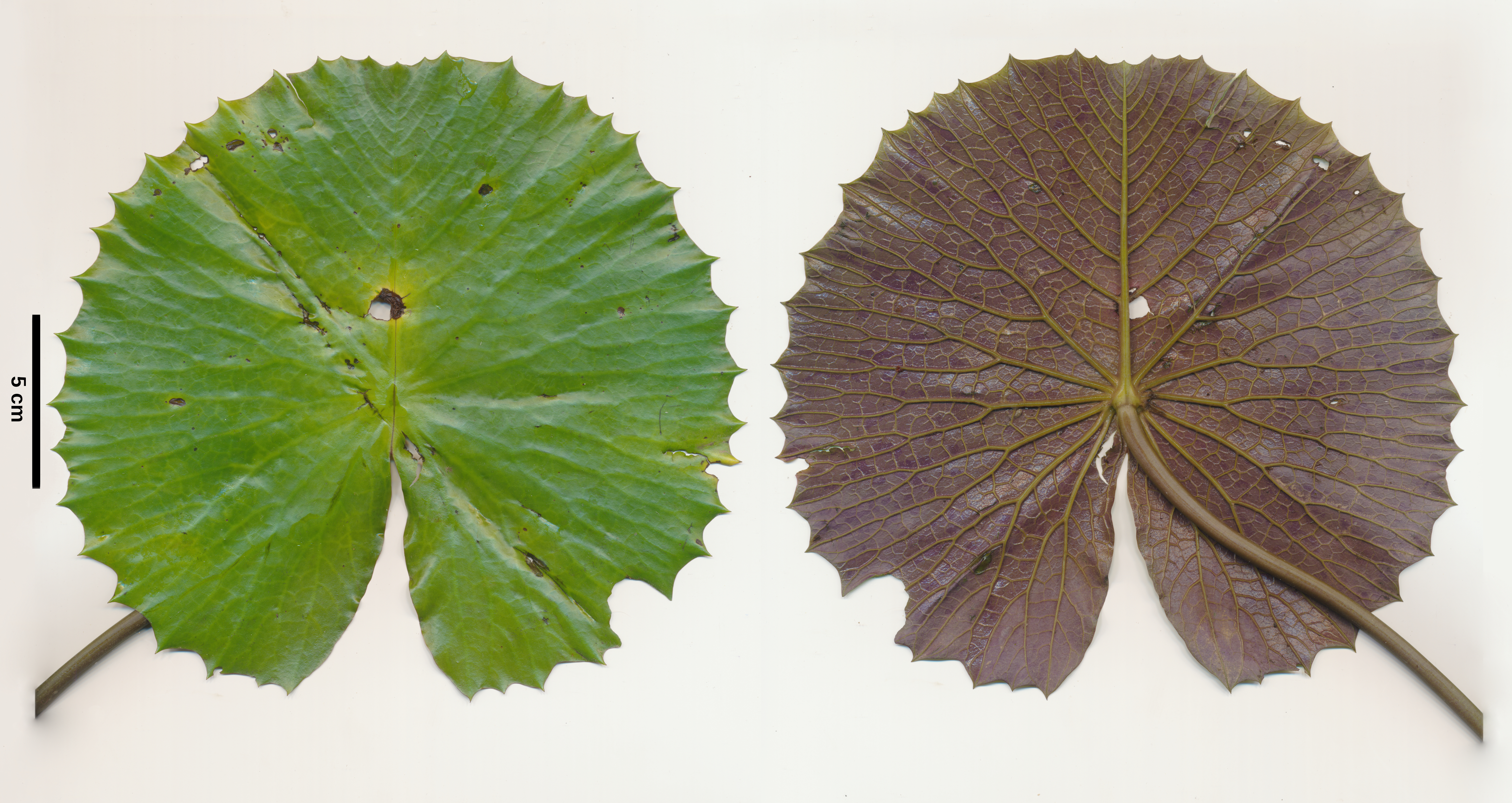
Nymphaea lotus var. thermalis (DC.) Tuzson floating leaf with scale bar (5 cm) on a white background

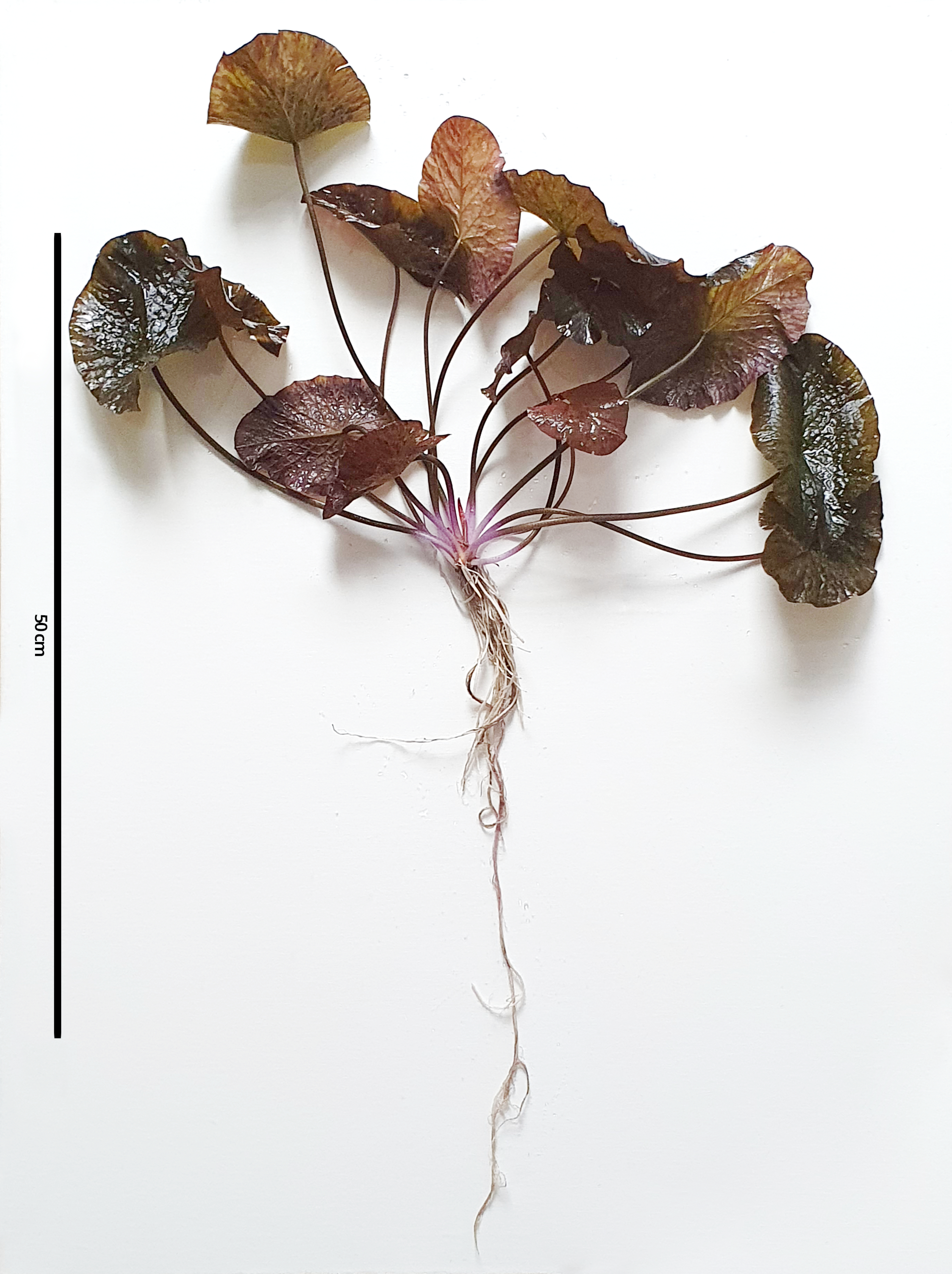
Complete Nymphaea lotus L. specimen with scale bar (50 cm) on a white background

=== Vegetative characteristics ===
Nymphaea lotus is a rhizomatous, perennial, aquatic herb with stoloniferous, ovoid, erect, branched or unbranched rhizomes bearing leaf scars. The stolons are slim. The coriaceous, orbicular to suborbicular floating leaves with a dentate margin are 10–32(−50) cm long, and 11–28(−50) cm wide. The leaf venation is actinodromous.

=== Generative characteristics ===
The white or cream, fragrant to nearly inodorous, nocturnal, protogynous, pedunculate, (6–)10–18(–25) cm wide flowers extend 15–20 cm above the water surface. The receptacle is conical. The stout, pubescent, 0.6–2.0 cm wide peduncle has 6 primary central and 12 secondary peripheral air canals. The flower has four green, broadly ovate, 4.5–9(−11) cm long, and 2–3.5 cm wide sepals. The 19–20 oval petals have a rounded apex. The androecium consists of 40–80(−90) yellow stamens. The gynoecium consists of 20–30 carpels. The large, globose, 6–9 cm wide fruit with persistent sepals bears numerous arillate, ellipsoid, 1.4–1.8 mm long, and 0.9–1.2 mm wide seeds. The peduncle does not coil in fruit. Proliferating pseudanthia are absent.

=== Cytology ===
The chromosome count is 2n = 56. It is a tetraploid species.

== Taxonomy ==
It was described by Carl Linnaeus in 1753. The lectotype was designated by Bernard Verdcourt in 1989. It is placed in the subgenus Nymphaea subg. Lotos, of which it is the type species.

== Distribution ==
It grows in various parts of East Africa and Southeast Asia. Nymphaea lotus var. thermalis was believed to be a Tertiary relict variety endemic to the thermal waters of Europe, for example, the Peţa River in Romania. DNA analysis has concluded that Nymphaea lotus var. thermalis lacks distinctiveness from Nymphaea lotus and therefore cannot be classified as a relic population.

== Ecology ==
Nymphaea lotus has the exceptional ability to persist through a dry season with rhizomes. It possesses the ability to reduce evaporation by up to 18 percent on most of the days during the summer period.

== Conservation ==
Overall, Nymphaea lotus has been categorised as a species of Least Concern (LC). However, in the Mediterranean, it is classified as Critically Endangered (CR).

== Uses ==
=== As an ornamental plant ===
It is cultivated as an ornamental plant in aquaria, where it is cultivated under bright conditions in 22–28°C warm water.

=== As a symbol ===
The Egyptian lotus is the national flower of Egypt.

Claire Waight Keller included the flower to represent Malawi in Meghan Markle's wedding veil, which included the distinctive flora of each Commonwealth country.

=== As food ===
The tubers and seeds are used as food.

== Chemistry ==
Other compounds include myricitrin, myricetin-3-(6′′-p-coumaroylglucoside), myricetin-3′-O-(6′′-p-coumaroyl)glucoside and two epimeric macrocyclic derivatives, nympholide A and B, myricetin-3-O-rhamnoside and penta-O-galloyl-β-D-glucose.
