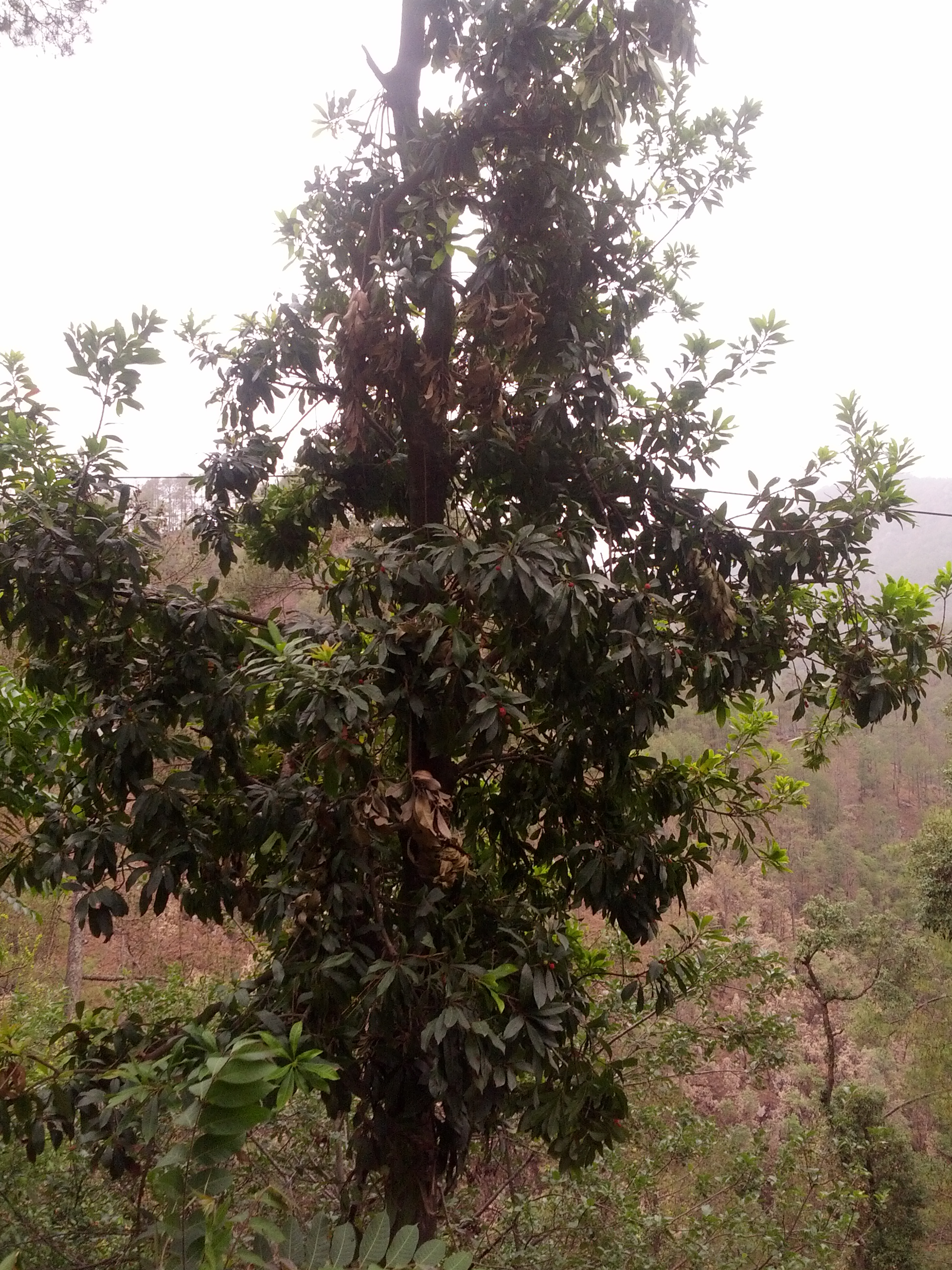

Scientific classification
- Kingdom: Plantae
- Clade: Tracheophytes
- Clade: Angiosperms
- Clade: Eudicots
- Clade: Rosids
- Order: Fagales
- Family: Myricaceae
- Genus: Myrica
- Species: M. esculenta

Binomial name
- Myrica esculenta Buch.-Ham. ex D.Don

Synonyms
- Morella esculenta (Buch.-Ham. ex D.Don) I.M.Turner in Gard. Bull. Singapore 53: 324 (2001)

= Myrica esculenta =

Species of tree

Myrica esculenta is a tree or large shrub of the tropics. The native range of this species stretches from Northern India (Uttarakhand) to Nepal to southern China and western and central Malaysia. Its common names include box myrtle, bayberry and kaphal. Its berries are edible and are consumed locally.

It is the state fruit of the northern Indian state of Uttarakhand.

== Description ==
Myrica esculenta is a evergreen tree of medium height, about 6 to 8 m (20 to 26 ft) tall. The yellow bark is soft and brittle. Its leaves are conjoint, 30–60 cm (1–2 ft) feet long, and has leaflets in pairs of 6 to 9 and it has a width of 19 mm (0.75 in). The flowers are white in color and are found in bunches. The fruit is a globose, succulent drupe, with a hard endocarp; diameter 1.1–1.3 cm (0.43–0.51 in); average mass 670 mg (10.3 gr). Similar looking to a mulberry. Seeds are triangular in shape and are astringent in taste.

== Taxonomy ==
Known locally as 'kaphal' or 'kafal' in Uttarakhand and Nepal,'sohphie' in Meghalaya or 'maching' in Nyshi language of Arunachal Pradesh).

It was first published in Prodr. Fl. Nepal. on page 56 in 1825.

It has four known varieties;

- Myrica esculenta var. balansae Dode
- Myrica esculenta var. chevalieri (Dode) H.H.Pham
- Myrica esculenta var. esculenta
- Myrica esculenta var. tonkinensis A.Chev.

According to Ayurveda, it has two varieties based on the color of flower: Shweta (white) and Rakta (red).

== Distribution ==
It is native to the hills of Uttarakhand, western Nepal and the eastern part of the Indian Himayalan states such as Arunachal Pradesh and Meghalaya and southern Bhutan. It is also found in Assam, Bangladesh, Borneo, southern China, Java, Lesser Sunda Islands, Malaya, Myanmar, Philippines, Sumatera, Thailand and Vietnam.

== Habitat ==
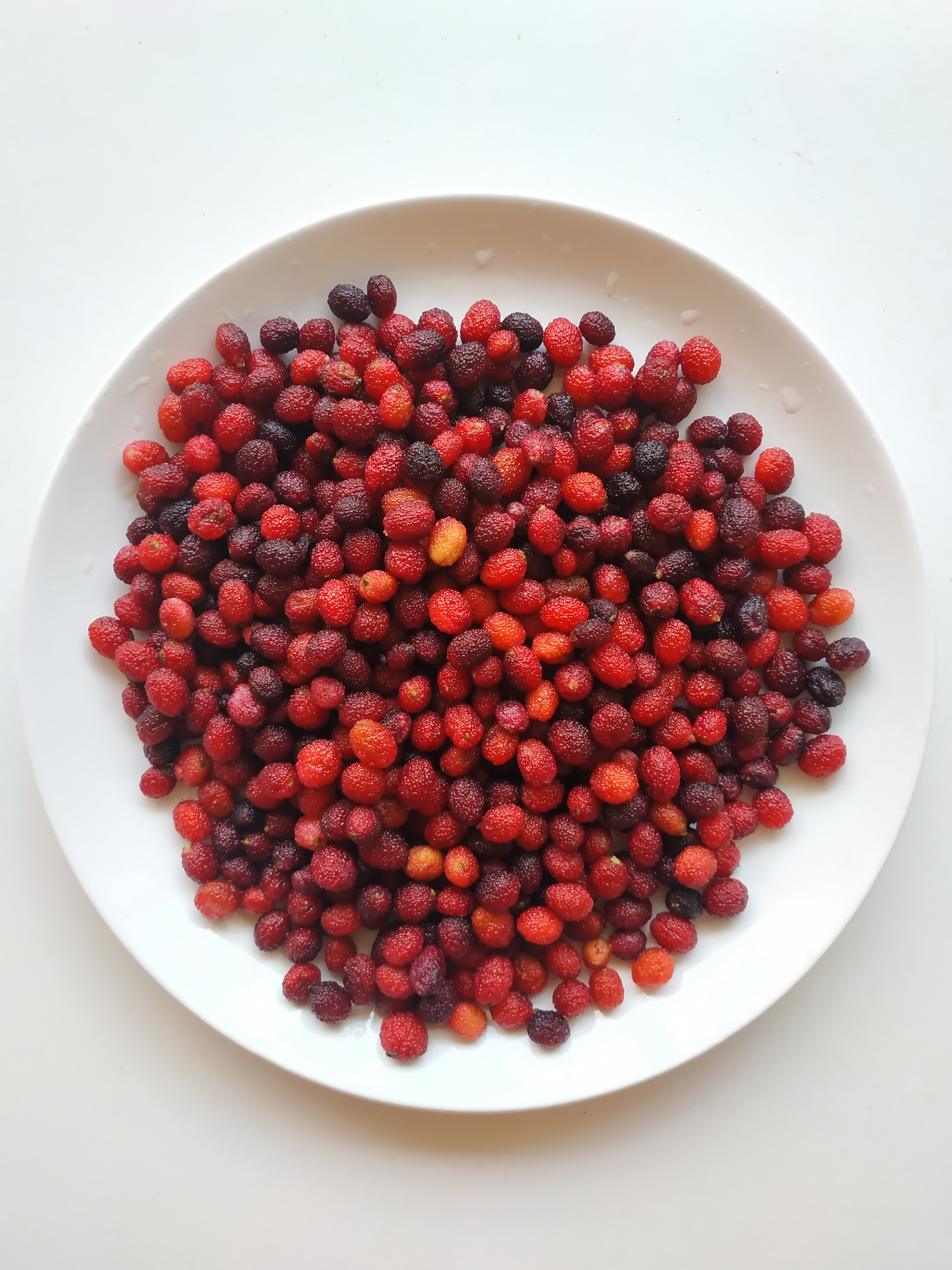
Bayberries or Kafal from Kafal tree Myrica esculenta in Lalitpur District, Nepal

Myrica esculenta is found in the hilly regions of northern India, and Nepal, especially in the regions of Garhwal, Kumaon and Eastern part of Himayala of Himachal Pradesh. Mainly in Shimla, Mandi Solan & Sirmaur districts, Uttarakhand, Arunachal Pradesh, Meghalaya, southern Bhutan, and western Nepal, especially at elevations of 900–1,800 m (3,000–6,000 ft) above sea level.

It is also found at elevations below 1,500 m (4,900 ft) in the mid-hills of Nepal. It is also found in Pakke-Kessang, Lower subansiri, kurung kumey district of Arunachal Pradesh and some parts of Himachal Pradesh and Meghalaya.

== Chemical constituents ==
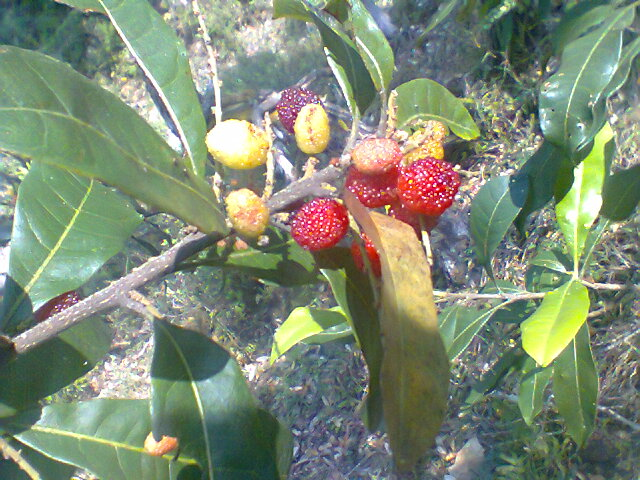
Fruits of Kaphal plant at Dailekh, Nepal.

The bark contains the chemical substances; myricetin, myricitrin and glycosides. The leaves of the plant also contain flavone-4'-hydroxy-3',5,5'-trimethoxy-7-O-β-I-D-glucopyranosy)(1→4)-α-L-rhamnopyranoside; flavone-3',4'-dihydroxy-6-methoxy-7-O-α-L-rhamnopyranoside; β-sitosterol; β-sitosterol-β-D-glucopyranoside and quercetin. Polyphenols, carotenoids, and vitamin C are some phytochemicals that have been found in the fruits. An extract of the fruit of plant species was reported to lower oxidative stresses (Shri et al. 2018).
