= Alexandru Borza =

Romanian botanist, Greek-Catholic priest and honorary archpriest of Cluj

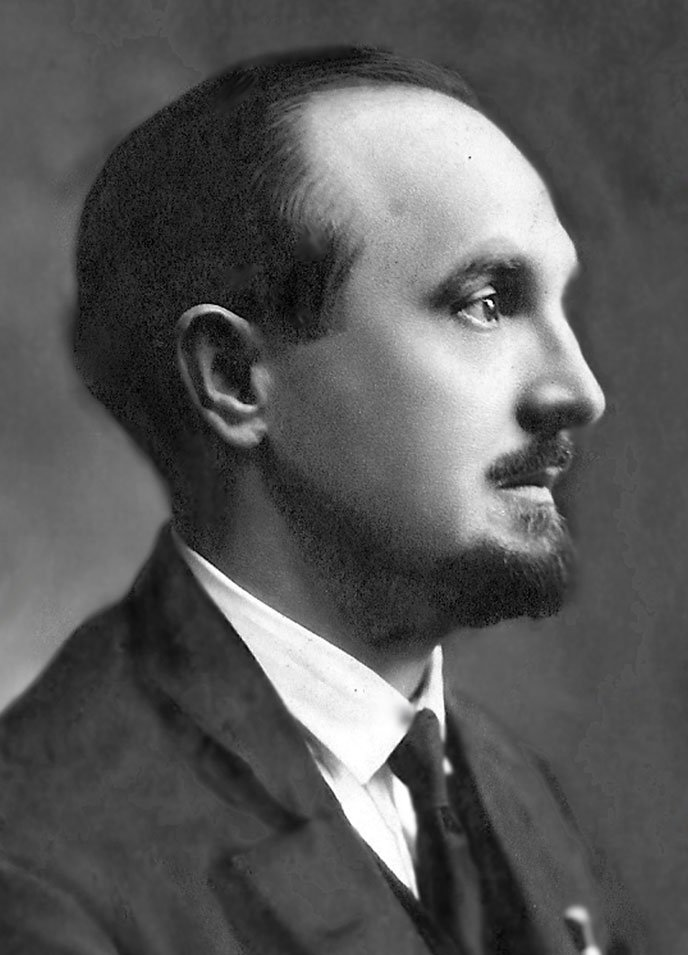
- Born: 1887; Alba Iulia
- Died: September 3, 1971 (aged 83–84); Cluj
- Occupations: Romanian botanist, Greek-Catholic priest and honorary archpriest of Cluj

Alexandru Borza (1887, in Alba Iulia – 3 September 1971, in Cluj) was a Romanian botanist, Greek-Catholic priest and honorary archpriest of Cluj.

As part of a group of professors, physicians, soldiers, and others, he helped bring Scouting to Romania.

In 1923, he founded the Cluj Botanical Garden, which now bears his name. The Retezat National Park, the first nature park of Romania, was founded in 1935 at his initiative.

Before World War II, he was the president of the General Association of the Uniate Romanians (AGRU), a Greek-Catholic association. For this role, he was briefly arrested in 1948, after the Communists came to power in Romania. He was elected a post-mortem member of the Romanian Academy in 1990.

He is credited with first advocating for the legal protection of Nymphaea lotus var. thermalis while he was the government minister in charge of education.

== Works ==
- Flora și vegetația Văii Sebeșului, Editura Academiei, Bucharest 1959
- Nicolae Boscaiu: Introducere în studiul covorului vegetal, Editura Academiei, Bucharest 1965
- Dicționar etnobotanic, Editura Academiei, Bucharest 1968
- Amintirile turistice ale unui naturalist călător pe trei continente, Editura Sport-Turism, Bucharest 1987
