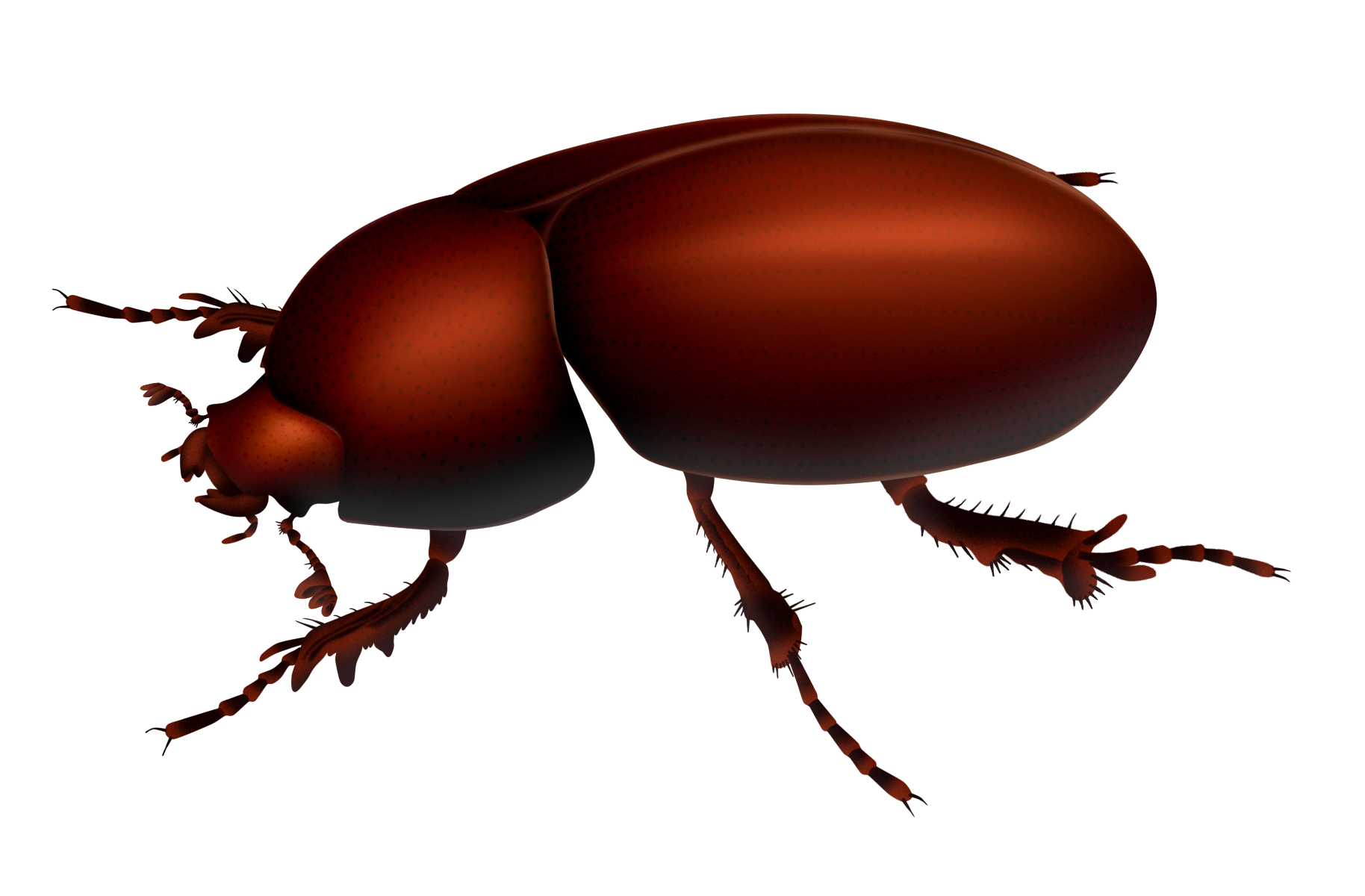
- Life restoration

Scientific classification
- Kingdom: Animalia
- Phylum: Arthropoda
- Clade: Pancrustacea
- Class: Insecta
- Order: Coleoptera
- Suborder: Polyphaga
- Infraorder: Scarabaeiformia
- Family: Hybosoridae
- Genus: †Tyrannasorus; Ratcliffe & Ocampo, 2001
- Species: †T. rex

Binomial name
- †Tyrannasorus rex Ratcliffe & Ocampo, 2001

= Tyrannasorus rex =

Tyrannasorus rex Temporal range: Miocene 20.4–13.8 Ma
- Dorsal view

Extinct species of beetle

Tyrannasorus rex is an extinct species of hybosorid beetle and the sole member of the genus Tyrannasorus. The species is known from a single, presumably female fossil specimen found in the Dominican Republic. It was trapped in the resin of Hymenaea protera, a species of tree that is also now extinct, and was preserved as the resin fossilized into amber. The most recent studies date Dominican amber to the Miocene epoch (15 to 20 million years ago).

T. rex is broadly similar to modern-day hybosorids of genera Apalonychus and Coilodes, sharing their reddish-brown color and a rounded shape, but is distinguished by its nine-segmented antennae, compared with the ten segments typical of other West Indian hybosorid beetles. The name of the species is a wordplay on "another famous, and much larger, species of extinct animal".

== Taxonomy ==
The genus Tyrannasorus belongs to Hybosorinae, a subfamily of hybosorid beetles whose adults feed primarily on carcasses and feces. The genus is monotypic; its sole species is the extinct Tyrannasorus rex. The species and genus were described in 2001 by the entomologists Brett C. Ratcliffe and Federico C. Ocampo from a single fossilized specimen, found embedded in amber. This specimen, called the holotype, is deposited in the American Museum of Natural History, New York.

Tyrannasorus rex was the first fossil hybosorid described from the Dominican Republic; the second, Procoilodes adrastus, followed in 2002. The West Indies—the island region that includes the Dominican Republic—are presently home to three native hybosorid species: Apalonychus rufulus, A. waterhousei, and Coilodes nigripennis.

The paleontologists Manuel Iturralde-Vinent and Ross MacPhee propose that the West Indies may have been briefly connected to northwestern South America by a hypothetical land bridge during the Eocene-Oligocene transition (35 to 33 million years ago). This would have allowed hybosorids to colonize the West Indies. As the original landmass broke up into islands, new hybosorid species may have arisen through vicariance.

=== Etymology ===
Tyranna, which Ratcliffe and Ocampo describe as "the loosely formed stem" of the genus name, comes from the Latin tyrannus, meaning "master" or "tyrannical". The second part of the genus name comes from the Latin sorus, which means "hump" or "pile"; the same suffix is used for the name of the family Hybosoridae and its type genus, Hybosorus. The resulting name, "tyrannical hump", refers to the "possible state of 'mind'" of the holotype when it became fatally trapped in a blob of sticky tree sap. The specific epithet rex means "king" in Latin.

The beetle's name is an example of wordplay in binomial nomenclature, alluding to "another famous, and much larger, species of extinct animal". The naturalist John Acorn explains that both Tyrannasorus rex, the beetle, and Tyrannosaurus rex, the dinosaur, can correctly be called T. rex, citing this as an example of confusion that may arise from abbreviating generic names.

== Description ==
From left to right: front, middle, and hind leg. A clue to the holotype's sex is in its front legs and claws.

Tyrannasorus is most similar to the genera Coilodes and Apalonychus, particularly in its reddish-brown color and slightly rounded shape. Ratcliffe and Ocampo surmised that the holotype is female based on the similarities of its front legs and tarsal claws to those of the female specimens of Apalonychus. It measures 5.8 mm in length and 2.7 mm in width.

=== Head ===
The frons (upper part of the face) is irregularly pitted, and its edges curve upward. The clypeus, a hardened plate on the lower face, has a truncate front edge with curved sides. This straight, cut-off edge distinguishes Tyrannasorus from Procoilodes.

The eyes of Tyrannasorus are difficult to see from above.

Front view, showing the distinctly straight edge of the lower face

The flap-like mouthpart called the labrum extends beyond the clypeus, forming a trapezoidal shape and featuring a row of bristles at its center. Its base is narrower than that of Coilodes and Apalonychus. The mandibles—tooth-like structures used for chewing—are large, with a smooth, concave surface and a sharp tooth. The eye canthus, which divides the compound eye, is elongated and rectangular. Unlike the rounded, prominent eyes of Apalonychus, the eyes of Tyrannasorus are not easily discernible when viewed from above. The maxillary palps, sensory appendages near the mouth, consist of four segments that progressively increase in length. The labium, or lower lip, is equipped with long bristles.

Tyrannasorus is distinguished by a 9-segmented antenna.

Unlike other hybosorid beetles from the West Indies, which typically have ten-segmented feelers called antennae, Tyrannasorus is distinguished by its nine-segmented antennae. The club (the end part of the antenna) is three-segmented, with the first segment slightly hollowed to fit the others. This indentation is shallow compared with the deep, cup-shaped antennal club of Coilodes. The club is also less elongated than that of Apalonychus. In contrast to Procoilodes, the shallow indentation of the club is a distinguishing feature of Tyrannasorus. All segments are covered in fine, velvety hairs, while the first and the fifth also have bristles (setae).

=== Thorax, abdomen, and legs ===
The sinuous, or wavy, front edge of the pronotum (a shield-like plate covering the first segment of the thorax) sets Tyrannasorus apart from Coilodes and Apalonychus. The scutellum, a triangular structure on the back of the thorax, has a rounded tip and a smooth surface, unlike that of Procoilodes. The hardened wing covers, known as elytra, are smooth, with minute pits but no distinct ridges. They are widest at the middle, with slightly raised bumps near the base of the elytra, called humeral umbones. The margins are bordered with a bead-like edge.

Dark amber obscures the specimen's abdomen.

Some parts of the specimen's body, especially the abdomen, are obscured by the dark pigmentation of the amber, but a pair of forelegs, a pair of middle legs, and a pair of posterior legs are clearly visible. The legs have simple claws. The front tibiae—leg segments between the knees and feet—are equipped with three sharp teeth along their edge, with smaller teeth between them. The middle and hind tibiae feature a ridge lined with bristles and end in two spurs. The foot (tarsus) consists of five segments, with the first and fifth being the longest. Each segment ends with a pair of bristles.

== Provenance ==
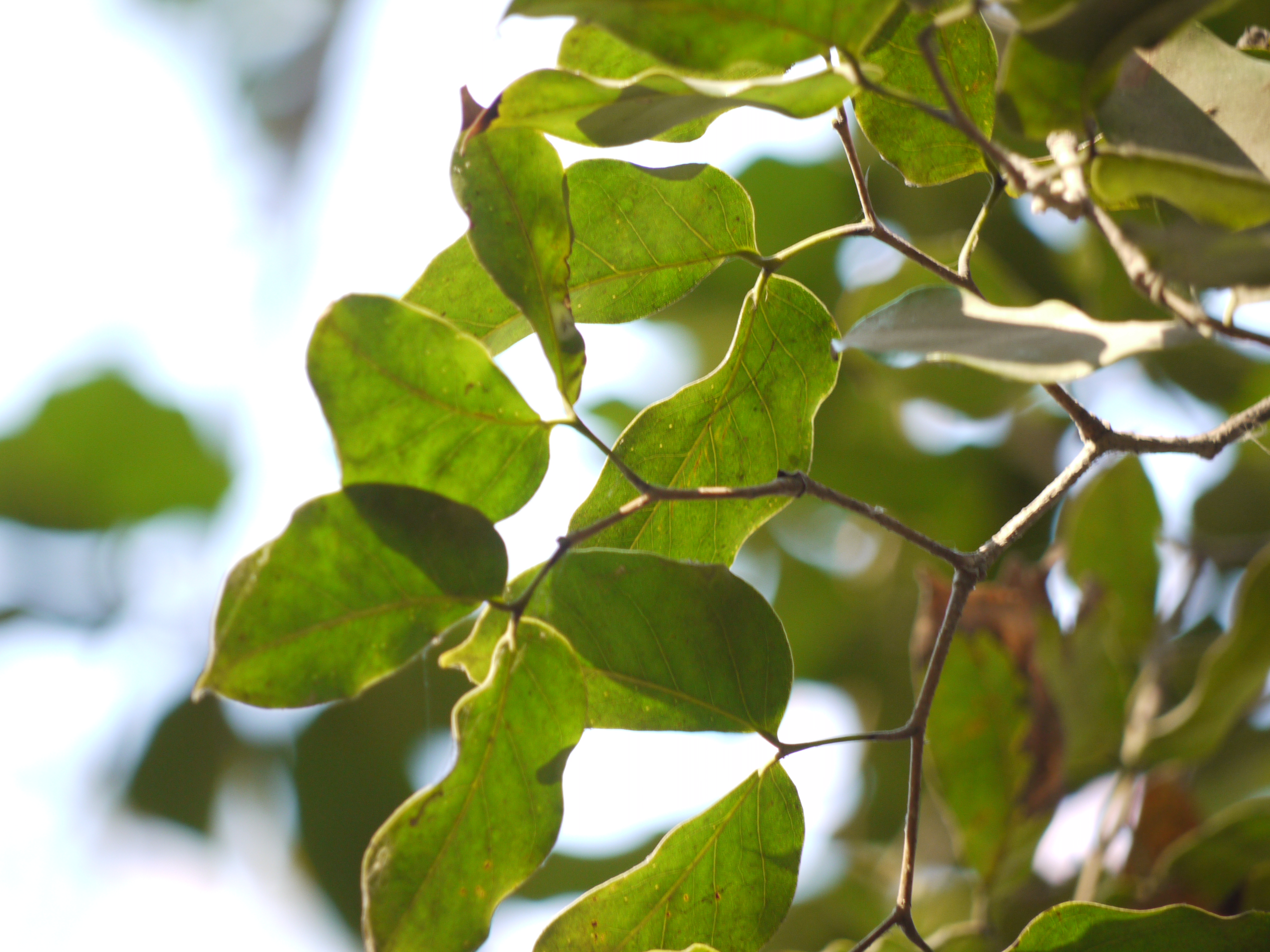
Hymenaea verrucosa is an extant relative of the tree that produced the resin which trapped and killed the beetle.

The amber in which the holotype is enclosed came from the resin produced by Hymenaea protera, a leguminous tree that is also extinct. Prior to the description of Tyrannasorus, numerous other fossil animals, particularly insects, had already been described from this amber. Scarabaeoid beetles found in it include another hybosorid, a canthonine, a scarab, a stag beetle, as well as specimens of Ataenius, Rhyparus, and Termitodius.

Joseph B. Lambert, James S. Frye, and George Poinar, Jr. dated the Dominican amber to Oligocene or Eocene. Later research by Iturralde-Vinent and MacPhee found this to be erroneous and dated all Dominican amber to 15 to 20 million years ago, which corresponds to Miocene.

The exact provenance of the amber could not be determined because researchers bought it from dealers, who had bought it from miners. Ratcliffe and Ocampo presume that it came from the mountain range north of Santiago de los Caballeros, the area where most of the Dominican amber mines are situated. The amber-rich layer is found within the top 300 meters of the La Toca Formation, where sandstone alternates with deposits containing pebbles, organic matter, and thin layers of coal. It occurs both in sandstone beds containing lignite and in the lignite layers themselves.
