= Ceratocanthinae =

Scientific classification
- Kingdom: Animalia
- Phylum: Arthropoda
- Clade: Pancrustacea
- Class: Insecta
- Order: Coleoptera
- Suborder: Polyphaga
- Infraorder: Scarabaeiformia
- Family: Hybosoridae
- Subfamily: Ceratocanthinae; A. Martínez, 1968

Type genus
- Ceratocanthus White, 1842

Tribes
- Ceratocanthini Martinez 1968; Scarabatermitini Nikolaev, 1999; Ivieolini Howden and Gill, 2000

Synonyms
- Acanthoceridae Lacordaire, 1856

Subfamily of beetles

Ceratocanthinae is a subfamily of the scarabaeoid beetle family Hybosoridae. It includes three tribes comprising 43 genera and 366 species; it was formerly treated as a separate family, Ceratocanthidae.

== Description ==
Ceratocanthinae are small sized beetles from 2.0 to 10.0 millimeters in length. Adult beetles can be found on the bark and branches of dead trees and on fungus.

== Distribution ==
Ceratocanthinae are relatively widespread. They can be found in Australian, Afrotropical, Indomalaysian, Neotropical, Nearctic, and Palaearctic regions.

== Ecology ==
The adults have been found to associate with termites and ants. Larvae live under bark and in burrows of bessbugs (Passalidae).

== Taxonomy ==
The subfamily Ceratocanthinae contains 43 genera:

- Acanthocerodes Péringuey, 1901
- Afrocloetus Petrovitz, 1968
- Aneilobolus Hesse, 1948
- Anopsiostes Paulian, 1982
- Astaenomoechus Martínez & Pereira, 1959
- Aulisostes Howden & Gill, 2000
- Baloghianestes Paulian, 1968
- Besuchetostes Paulian, 1972
- Callophilharmostes Paulian, 1968
- Carinophilharmostes Paulian, 1968
- Ceratocanthoides Paulian, 1982
- Ceratocanthopsis Paulian, 1982
- Ceratocanthus White, 1842
- Chaetophilharmostes Paulian, 1977
- Cloeotus Germar, 1843
- Congomostes Paulian, 1968
- Cryptophilharmostes Ballerio, 2000
- Cryptosphaeroides Ballerio, 2009
- Cyphopisthes Gestro, 1898
- Ebbrittoniella Martínez, 1962
- Eusphaeropeltis Gestro, 1898
- Germarostes Paulian, 1982
- Glyptogermarostes Ocampo & Ballerio, 2006
- Goudotostes Paulian, 1979
- Ivieolus Howden & Gill, 1988
- Macrophilharmostes Paulian, 1978
- Madrasostes Paulian, 1975
- Martinezostes Paulian, 1982
- Melanophilharmostes Paulian, 1968
- Nesopalla Paulian & Howden, 1982
- Oxymorostes Ballerio, 2009
- Paulianostes Ballerio, 2000
- Perignamptus Harold, 1877
- Petrovitzostes Paulian, 1977
- Philharmostes Kolbe, 1895
- Pseudopterorthochaetes Paulian, 1977
- Pseudosynarmostes Ballerio, 2009
- Pterorthochaetes Gestro, 1898
- Scarabaeinus Silvestri, 1940
- Scarabatermes Howden, 1973
- Synarmostes Germar, 1843
- Trachycrusus Howden & Gill, 1995
- Xenocanthus Howden & Gill, 1988
