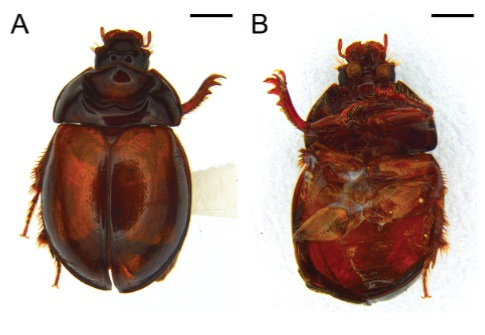

Scientific classification
- Kingdom: Animalia
- Phylum: Arthropoda
- Class: Insecta
- Order: Coleoptera
- Suborder: Polyphaga
- Infraorder: Scarabaeiformia
- Family: Hybosoridae
- Genus: Coilodes
- Species: C. mayae

Binomial name
- Coilodes mayae Basílio & Vaz-de-Mello, 2023

= Coilodes mayae =

Species of beetle

Coilodes mayae is a species of beetle of the family Hybosoridae. This species is found in Brazil (Espírito Santo).

Adults reach a length of about 5.6 mm (males) and 5.5–6 mm (females). The colour of their head and pronotum is dark brown, while the scutellar shield, venter and legs are yellowish brown. The elytra is yellowish brown with dark brown margins.

== Etymology ==
The species is named in honour Maya Basílio Dantas, younger niece of the first author.
