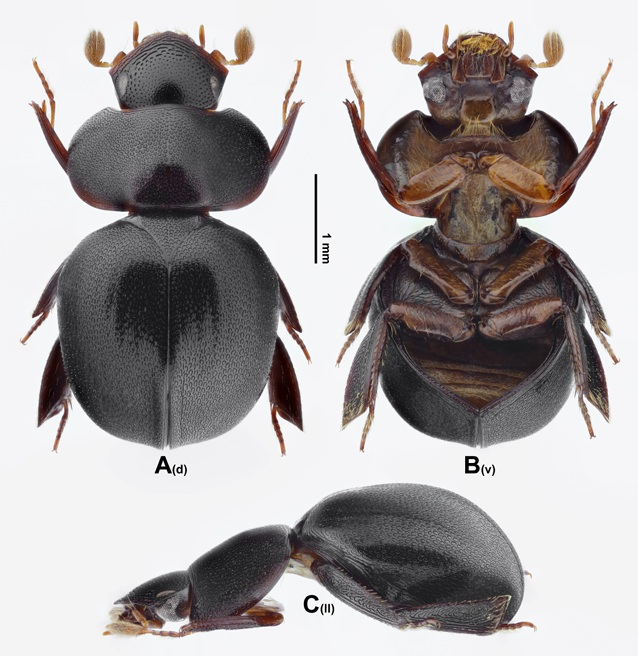

Scientific classification
- Domain: Eukaryota
- Kingdom: Animalia
- Phylum: Arthropoda
- Class: Insecta
- Order: Coleoptera
- Suborder: Polyphaga
- Infraorder: Scarabaeiformia
- Family: Hybosoridae
- Genus: Cyphopisthes
- Species: C. erlangshen

Binomial name
- Cyphopisthes erlangshen Wang, 2025

= Cyphopisthes erlangshen =

Species of beetle

Cyphopisthes erlangshen is a species of beetle of the Hybosoridae family. This species is found in China (Guangxi).

Adults reach a length of about 4.7 mm. The body is suboval and moderately shiny. The colour is mainly blackish, while the antennae are brown.

== Etymology ==
The name of the species is derived from the name Erlang Shen, a figure in Chinese mythology, celebrated for his extraordinary supernatural abilities and defiant spirit.
