= Hybosorus laportei =

Scientific classification
- Kingdom: Animalia
- Phylum: Arthropoda
- Clade: Pancrustacea
- Class: Insecta
- Order: Coleoptera
- Suborder: Polyphaga
- Infraorder: Scarabaeiformia
- Family: Hybosoridae
- Genus: Hybosorus
- Species: H. laportei

Binomial name
- Hybosorus laportei Westwood, 1845

Synonyms
- Hybosorus illigeri Reiche, 1853

Species of beetle

Hybosorus laportei is a species of beetle of the family Hybosoridae described by Westwood in 1845. The species was also later described as Hybosorus illigeri by Reiche in 1853.
