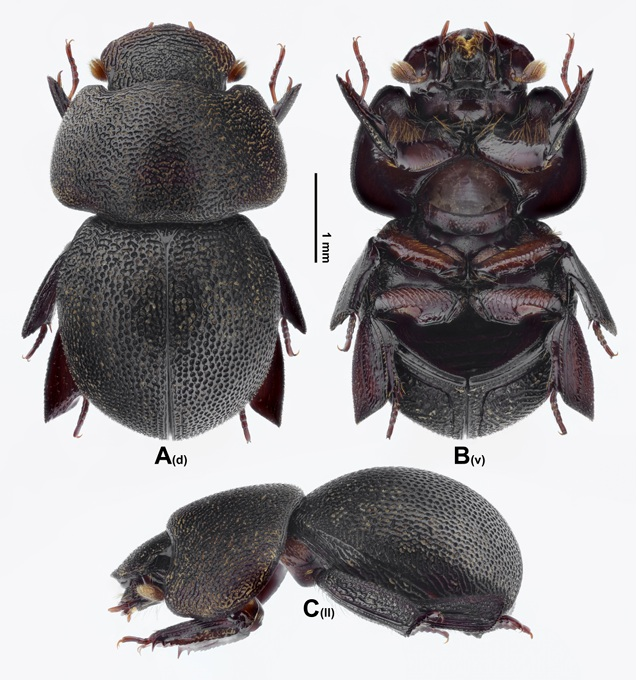

Scientific classification
- Domain: Eukaryota
- Kingdom: Animalia
- Phylum: Arthropoda
- Class: Insecta
- Order: Coleoptera
- Suborder: Polyphaga
- Infraorder: Scarabaeiformia
- Family: Hybosoridae
- Genus: Madrasostes
- Species: M. lini

Binomial name
- Madrasostes lini Wang, 2025

= Madrasostes lini =

Species of beetle

Madrasostes lini is a species of beetle of the Hybosoridae family. This species is found in China (Guangxi).

Adults reach a length of about 4.7 mm. The body is suboval and mainly blackish, while the antennae are brown.

== Etymology ==
The species is dedicated to Ye-Jie Lin, a young spider taxonomist.
