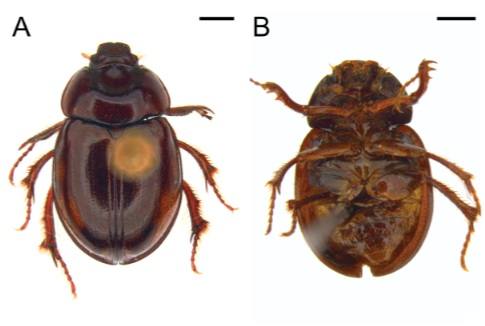

Scientific classification
- Kingdom: Animalia
- Phylum: Arthropoda
- Class: Insecta
- Order: Coleoptera
- Suborder: Polyphaga
- Infraorder: Scarabaeiformia
- Family: Hybosoridae
- Genus: Coilodes
- Species: C. humeralis

Binomial name
- Coilodes humeralis (Mannerheim, 1829)

Synonyms
- Hybosorus humeralis Mannerheim, 1829; Hybosorus gibbus Perty, 1830; Hybosorus brasiliensis Castelnau, 1840; Coilodes chilensis Westwood, 1846; Coelodes gibbus var. testaceus Pic, 1928

= Coilodes humeralis =

Species of beetle

Coilodes humeralis is a species of beetle of the family Hybosoridae. This species is found in Brazil (Distrito Federal, Minas Gerais, Espírito Santo, Mato Grosso do Sul, São Paulo, Rio de Janeiro, Paraná, Santa Catarina, Rio Grande do Sul), Paraguay (Amambay, Caazapá, Misiones), Argentina (Misiones) and possibly Chile.

Adults reach a length of about 5.5–8.7 mm (males) and 5.7–8.3 mm (females). The colour of their body ranges from black to dark brown. The elytral disc might have yellowish brown spots throughout the surface, or just on the humerus.

== Biology ==
This species has been collected in human and bovine faeces and in direct association with decomposing meat of pig, chicken and fish. Many specimens were collected in suspended traps using fish as bait and with ovitrap for mosquitoes. This demonstrates that C. humeralis has a good flight ability. In addition, the species seems to have stridulating behaviour and the ability to bury itself (probably as a defense mechanism).
