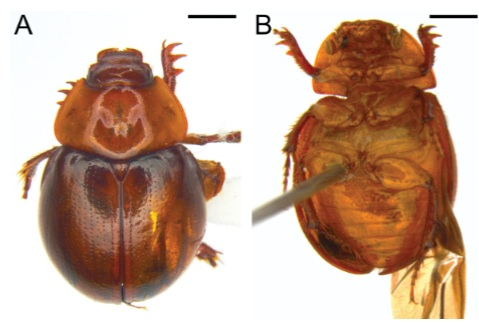

Scientific classification
- Kingdom: Animalia
- Phylum: Arthropoda
- Class: Insecta
- Order: Coleoptera
- Suborder: Polyphaga
- Infraorder: Scarabaeiformia
- Family: Hybosoridae
- Genus: Coilodes
- Species: C. fumipennis

Binomial name
- Coilodes fumipennis Arrow, 1909

= Coilodes fumipennis =

Species of beetle

Coilodes fumipennis is a species of beetle of the family Hybosoridae. This species is found in Colombia (Magdalena, Boyacá), French Guiana (Saint-Laurent-du-Maroni, Régina) and Brazil (Amazonas, Pará, Acre, Rondônia, Mato Grosso).

Adults reach a length of about 5.3–6.4 mm (males) and 5.4–7.1 mm (females). The colour of their head ranges from yellowish brown to dark brown, while the pronotum, scutellar shield, legs and venter are yellowish brown. The elytra is dark brown with a smoky region at the base and external margins.

== Biology ==
This species is attracted to fish and human faeces.
