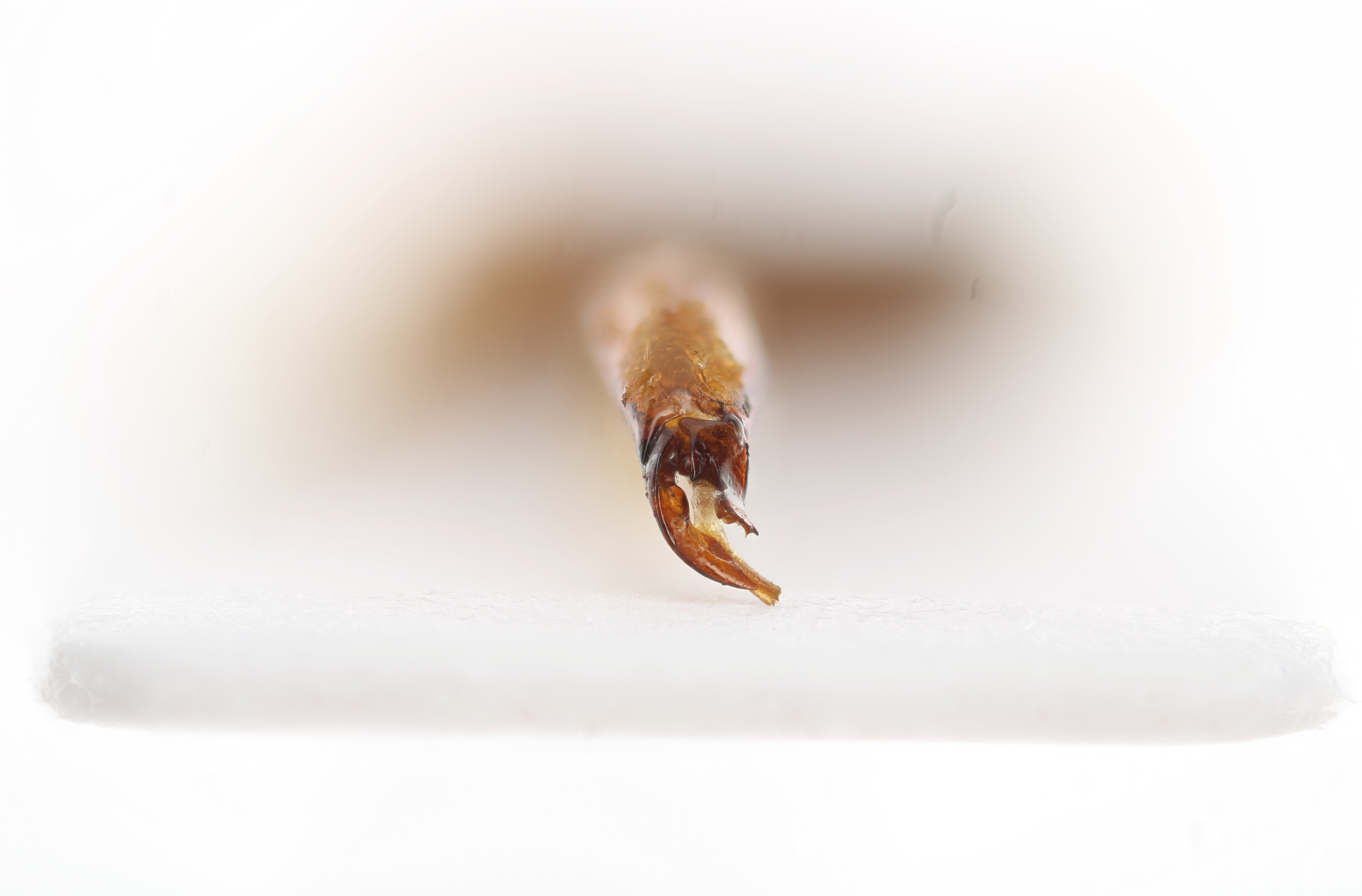

Scientific classification
- Kingdom: Animalia
- Phylum: Arthropoda
- Clade: Pancrustacea
- Class: Insecta
- Order: Coleoptera
- Suborder: Polyphaga
- Infraorder: Scarabaeiformia
- Family: Hybosoridae
- Subfamily: Hybosorinae
- Genus: Phaeochrous; Laporte, 1840

Type species
- Phaeochrous emarginatus Castelnau, 1840

Diversity
- About 67 species

Synonyms
- Acallus Dejean, 1833; Atimus Dejean, 1837; Silphodes Westwood, 1841

= Phaeochrous =

Genus of beetles

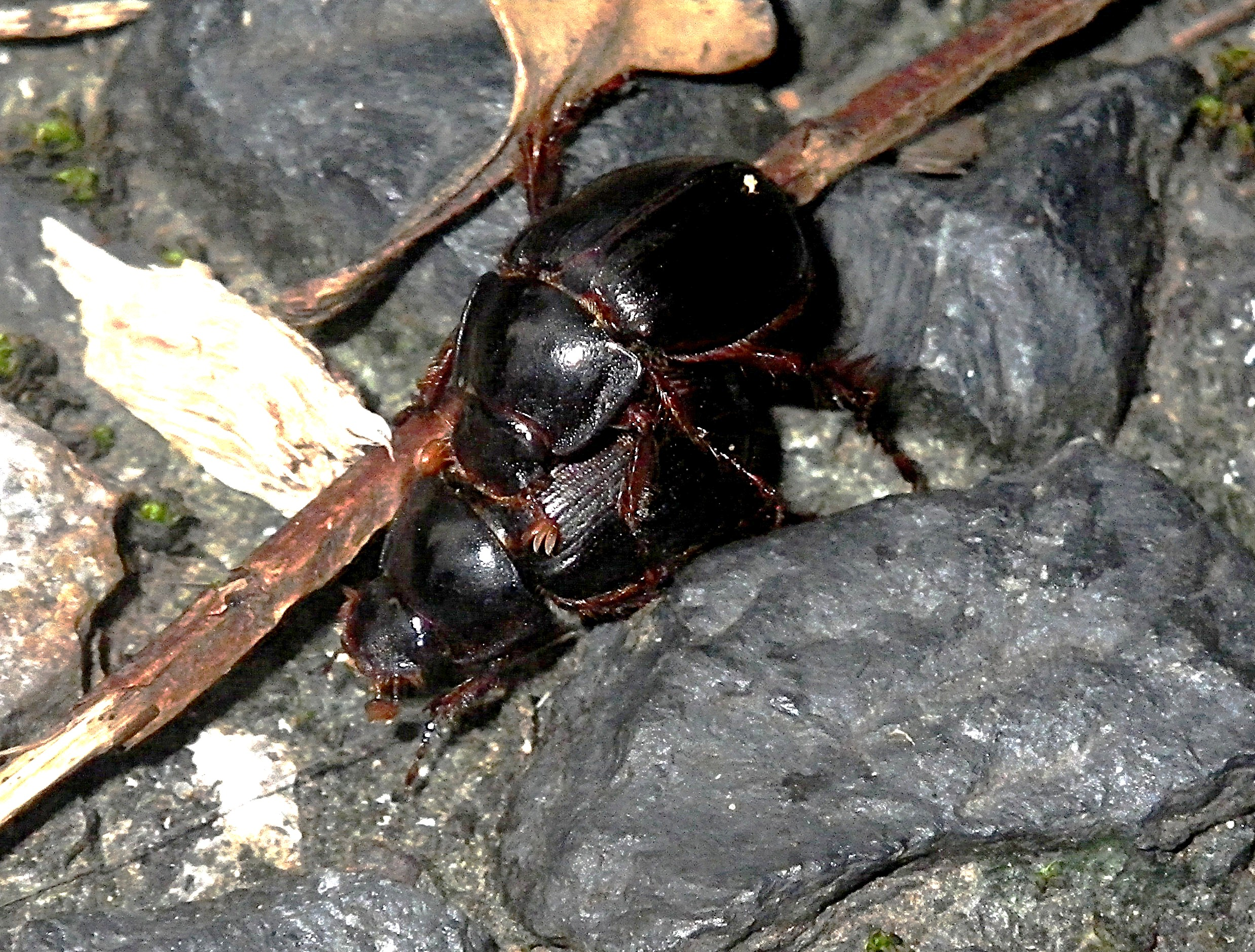
Phaeochrous tokaraensis, Amami Is., Japan

Phaeochrous is a genus of beetles belonging to the family Hybosoridae. The species are widely distributed over tropical Africa, Madagascar, Aldabra, Yemen, South Asia, South-East Asia, New Guinea and Oceanian islands, as well as North and West Australia.

== Description ==
Body length is approximately 8 to 17 mm. Eyes normally developed. Pronotum glabrous. Elytra striate, without longitudinal carenae. Male is yellowish brown, via dark reddish brown, to nearly black. Margins of the head, pronotum and elytra lighter, or more reddish whereas the ventrum is about reddish to dark brown. Labrum anteriorly emarginate, with a row of long, erect setae along its fore margin. Anterior margin of clypeus is concave. Gena rounded and protruding laterally beyond eye, and clothed with a conspicuous tuft of yellowish, erect setae. Pronotum disc with double isodiametric punctation and often a faint median longitudinal band is visible. Anterior margin of pronotum is bisinuate, whereas the base is bisinuate. Elytra completely glabrous or with sparse, hardly discernible, short, erect setae in apical area. Elytral surface with around 16 to 18 striae, composed of round to quadrangular punctures. Mandibles are more or less strongly protruding beyond labrum. Parameres are strongly asymmetric. Females with less wide to hardly present lateral deplanations in pronotum. Elytral setae of lateral fringe much shorter. Mandibles much less to hardly protruding beyond labrum, and evenly rounded.

== Species ==
- Phaeochrous amplus Arrow, 1909
- Phaeochrous australicus Kuijten, 1978
- Phaeochrous beccarii Harold, 1871
- Phaeochrous behrensii Horn, 1867
- Phaeochrous bicarinatus Kuijten, 1986
- Phaeochrous borealis Kuijten, 1984
- Phaeochrous burgoblitus Kuijten, 1986
- Phaeochrous camerunensis Arrow, 1909
- Phaeochrous compactus Kuijten, 1978
- Phaeochrous davaonis Kuijten, 1981
- Phaeochrous dispar Quedenfeldt, 1884
- Phaeochrous dissimilis Arrow, 1909
- Phaeochrous diversipes Pic, 1928
- Phaeochrous dubius (Westwood, 1845)
- Phaeochrous elevatus Kuijten, 1978
- Phaeochrous emarginatus Castelnau, 1840
- Phaeochrous enigmaticus Kuijten, 1978
- Phaeochrous gambiensis (Westwood, 1841)
- Phaeochrous gigas Schouteden, 1918
- Phaeochrous hainanensis Zhang, 1990
- Phaeochrous indicus (Westwood, 1845)
- Phaeochrous intermedius Pic, 1928
- Phaeochrous lobatus Kuijten, 1978
- Phaeochrous madagascariensis (Westwood, 1845)
- Phaeochrous madrassicus Kuijten, 1978
- Phaeochrous nicolasi Keith, 2002
- Phaeochrous nitidus Arrow, 1909
- Phaeochrous orbachi Keith & Ballerio, 2019
- Phaeochrous philippinensis (Westwood, 1841)
- Phaeochrous pletus Kuijten, 1978
- Phaeochrous portuum Kuijten, 1978
- Phaeochrous pseudintermedius Kuijten, 1978
- Phaeochrous rhodesianus Schouteden, 1918
- Phaeochrous rudis Kuijten, 1984
- Phaeochrous ruficollis Fairmaire, 1893
- Phaeochrous rufus Pic, 1928
- Phaeochrous schoutedeni Burgeon, 1928
- Phaeochrous senegalensis Castelnau, 1840
- Phaeochrous separabilis Zhang, 1990
- Phaeochrous stupendus Kuijten, 1986
- Phaeochrous sulawesi Kuijten, 1978
- Phaeochrous tanzanianus Tagliaferri, 2002
- Phaeochrous tertiarium (Deichmüller, 1881)
- Phaeochrous tokaraensis Nomura, 1961
- Phaeochrous tonkineus Pic, 1943
- Phaeochrous tumbanus Burgeon, 1928
- Phaeochrous turcanicola Kuijten, 1986
- Phaeochrous uelensis Burgeon, 1928
- Phaeochrous usambarae Burgeon, 1928
