= Cryptogenius =

- A taxonomic illustration of Cryptogenius inflatus.

Scientific classification
- Kingdom: Animalia
- Phylum: Arthropoda
- Clade: Pancrustacea
- Class: Insecta
- Order: Coleoptera
- Suborder: Polyphaga
- Infraorder: Scarabaeiformia
- Family: Hybosoridae
- Subfamily: Anaidinae
- Genus: Cryptogenius; Westwood, 1842

Type species
- Cryptogenius miersianus Westwood, 1842

Synonyms
- Cremastochilodius Krikken, 1975

Genus of scarab beetle

Cryptogenius is a genus of scarab beetles that belongs to the subfamily Anaidinae (may be a member of the tribe Cryptogeniini). Members of this genus inhabits the neotropical regions of South America (Amazon) and possibly Central America (Panama and Costa Rica).

== Taxonomy ==
Since the description of this genus, it had remained extremely obscure being little featured in catalogues. This genus was first described by John O. Westwood in 1845 with the type species being Cryptogenius miersianus. Cryptogenius was originally placed in the family Trogidae however it was removed from this family in 1986 and placed as the probable closest relative to the genus Anaides on the subfamily Anaidinae. In 2001, H. F. Howden grouped this genus with Callosides to form the newly proposed tribe Cryptogeniini. A study in 2023 by Costa-Silva, V. & Vaz-de-Mello, F. Z. recognized only two species: Cryptogenius miersianus and Cryptogenius westwoodi which was described as a new species.

=== Species ===
This genus possibly contains five species however some may be synonyms. They are all listed below with possible synonyms being noted:

- Cryptogenius fryi Arrow, 1909 (possible synonym of C. westwoodi)
- Cryptogenius inflatus
- Cryptogenius miersianus Westwood, 1842 (type species)
- Cryptogenius tristis (Krikken, 1975)
- Cryptogenius westwoodi Costa-Silva, V., & Vaz-de-Mello, F. Z., 2023
