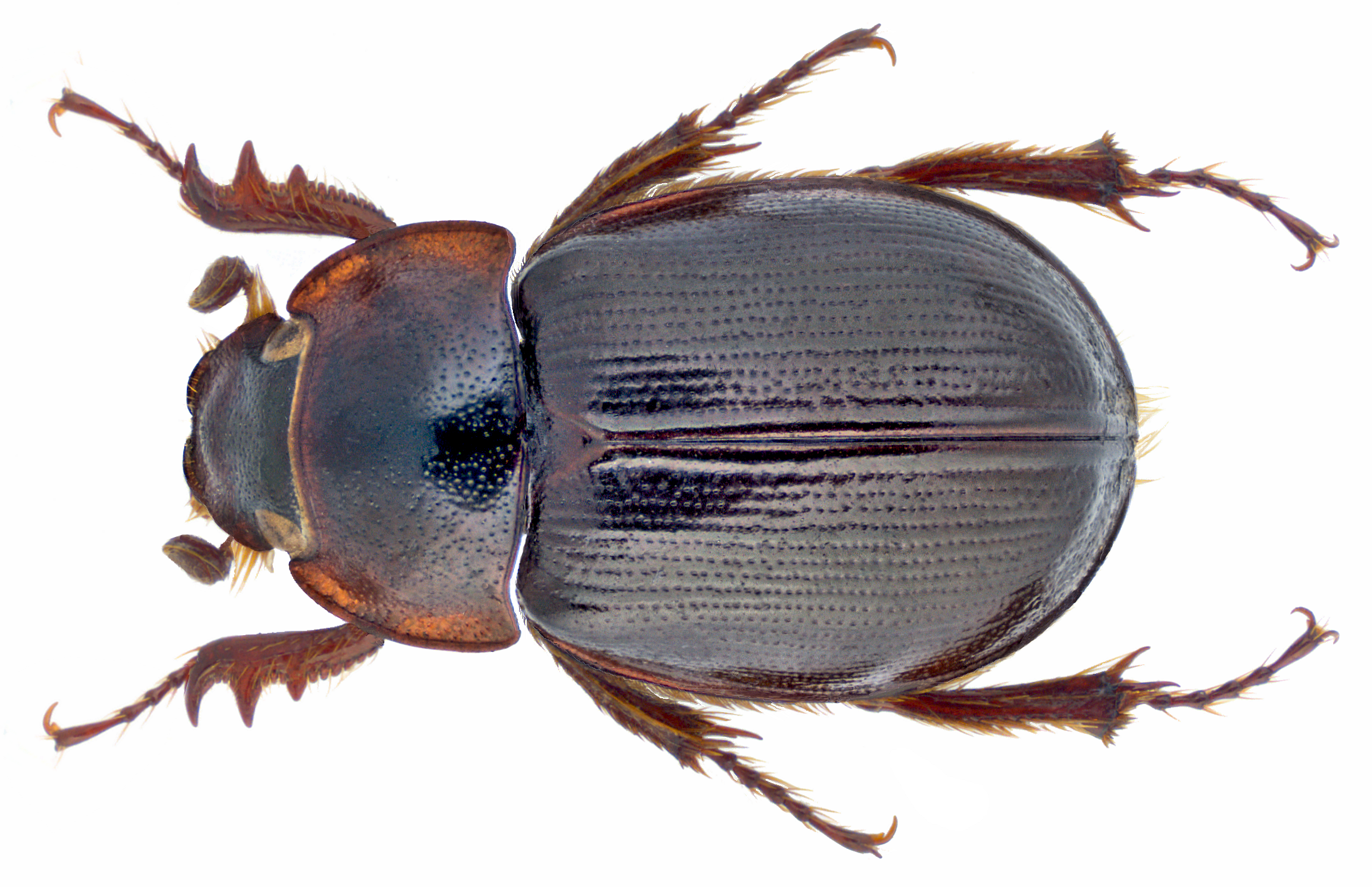

Scientific classification
- Kingdom: Animalia
- Phylum: Arthropoda
- Clade: Pancrustacea
- Class: Insecta
- Order: Coleoptera
- Suborder: Polyphaga
- Infraorder: Scarabaeiformia
- Family: Hybosoridae
- Genus: Phaeochrous
- Species: P. emarginatus

Binomial name
- Phaeochrous emarginatus Castelnau, 1840

Synonyms
- Phaeochrous alternatus Fairmaire, 1879; Phaeochrous asiaticus Lewis, 1896; Phaeochrous celebensis Pic, 1928; Phaeochrous gracilis Petrovitz, 1975; Phaeochrous pallidus Arrow, 1909; Phaeochrous perroudi Pic, 1943; Phaeochrous striatus Pic, 1944; Silphodes hirtipes MacLeay, 1864; Silphodes sumatrensis Westwood, 1841

= Phaeochrous emarginatus =

Species of beetle

Phaeochrous emarginatus is a species of scavenger scarab beetle found in India, Sri Lanka, Bhutan, China, Taiwan, Japan, Laos, Myanmar, Thailand, Malaysia, Vietnam, Indonesia, Philippines, New Guinea, Ryukyu Archipelago, and Australia.

== Description ==
There are slight differences among the subspecies. Nominate subspecies has elytral punctation which is not so strongly irregular. Typical length is about 8.2 to 13.7 mm. There are 5 to 25 denticles in fore tibia and slightly heterogeneous 5th, 9th and 13th interstriae. The irregular punctation are widely extended. Parameral excavation is well defined whereas the upper margin of blade is gently curved. Apex more or less curved downward.

The subspecies buruensis is about 8.1 to 9.5 mm in length. There are 6 to 11 denticles in fore tibia and regularly punctate striae in elytra. The 5th, 9th and 13th interstriae are approximately slightly heterogeneous. The subspecies benderitteri is about 10.1 to 15 mm in length, and there are 11 to 18 denticles in fore tibia. The subspecies suturalis is very small with a length of about 7.8 mm. It has 17 denticles in fore tibia. The subspecies suturalis is 8.7 to 10.2 mm in length. There are 11 to 15 denticles in fore tibia and striai punctation and heterogeneous 5th, 9th and 13th interstriae.

== Subspecies ==
Seven subspecies have been identified.

- Phaeochrous emarginatus benderitteri Pic, 1928
- Phaeochrous emarginatus buruensis Kuijten, 1978
- Phaeochrous emarginatus cyclops Prokofiev, 2012
- Phaeochrous emarginatus davidis Fairmaire, 1886
- Phaeochrous emarginatus emarginatus Castelnau, 1840
- Phaeochrous emarginatus suturalis Lansberge, 1885
- Phaeochrous emarginatus thilliezi Keith, 1999
