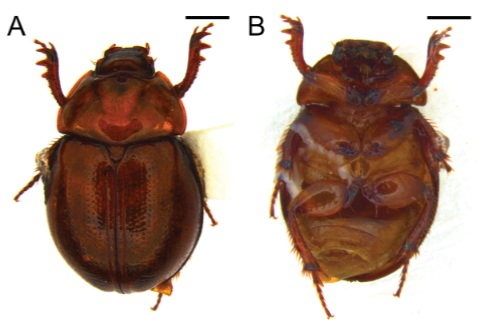

Scientific classification
- Kingdom: Animalia
- Phylum: Arthropoda
- Class: Insecta
- Order: Coleoptera
- Suborder: Polyphaga
- Infraorder: Scarabaeiformia
- Family: Hybosoridae
- Genus: Coilodes
- Species: C. ravii

Binomial name
- Coilodes ravii Basílio & Vaz-de-Mello, 2023

= Coilodes ravii =

Species of beetle

Coilodes ravii is a species of beetle of the family Hybosoridae. This species is found in Ecuador (Napo).

Adults reach a length of about 6.4 mm (males) and 5.8 mm (females). The colour of their body is yellowish brown, the elytra with the outer margins black.

== Biology ==
This species has been collected in carcasses of fish.

== Etymology ==
The species is named in honour Ravi Basílio Dantas, nephew of the first author.
