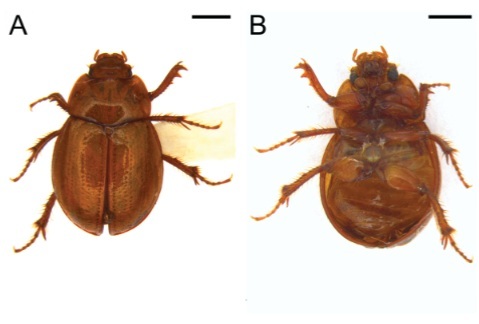

Scientific classification
- Kingdom: Animalia
- Phylum: Arthropoda
- Class: Insecta
- Order: Coleoptera
- Suborder: Polyphaga
- Infraorder: Scarabaeiformia
- Family: Hybosoridae
- Genus: Coilodes
- Species: C. edeiltae

Binomial name
- Coilodes edeiltae Basílio & Vaz-de-Mello, 2023

= Coilodes edeiltae =

Species of beetle

Coilodes edeiltae is a species of beetle of the family Hybosoridae. This species is found in Brazil (Minas Gerais, Rio de Janeiro, São Paulo, Paraná).

Adults reach a length of about 4.9–5.2 mm and have a yellowish brown body.

== Biology ==
This species has been collected in human faeces and carcasses of fish.

== Etymology ==
The species is named in honour Edeilta Silva Basílio, mother of the first author.
