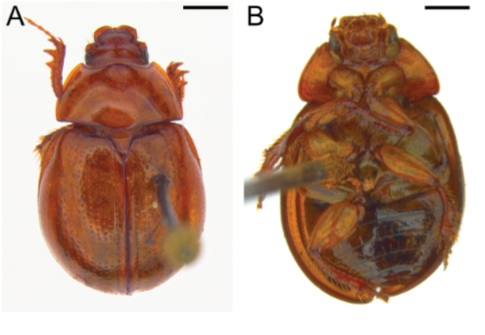

Scientific classification
- Kingdom: Animalia
- Phylum: Arthropoda
- Class: Insecta
- Order: Coleoptera
- Suborder: Polyphaga
- Infraorder: Scarabaeiformia
- Family: Hybosoridae
- Genus: Coilodes
- Species: C. punctipennis

Binomial name
- Coilodes punctipennis Arrow, 1909

= Coilodes punctipennis =

Species of beetle

Coilodes punctipennis is a species of beetle of the family Hybosoridae. This species is found in Ecuador, Peru and Bolivia.

Adults reach a length of about 5.8–6.9 mm (males) and 6.6–7.0 mm (females). The colour of their body is yellowish brown, sometimes with dark brown spots on the elytra.

== Biology ==
This species has been collected in human faeces.
