= Trex =

Trex may refer to:

- Tyrannosaurus rex, a large species of theropod dinosaur from the late Cretaceous Period
- Trex Company, Inc., a composite decking manufacturer
- Tampere Region Exchange, an Internet Exchange Point in Finland
- Trex (card game) a card game
- TREX search engine, a search engine in SAP NetWeaver
- TREX (Tree Regular Expressions for XML), a subset of Regular Language description for XML
- The proteins TREX1 and TREX2

== See also ==
- T. rex (disambiguation)
- Regulatory T cell, commonly abbreviated as "Tregs"
- Star TreX, a comic book crossover with characters from Star Trek and X-Men
