= Pachyplectrinae =

Scientific classification
- Kingdom: Animalia
- Phylum: Arthropoda
- Class: Insecta
- Order: Coleoptera
- Suborder: Polyphaga
- Infraorder: Scarabaeiformia
- Family: Hybosoridae
- Subfamily: Pachyplectrinae; Ocampo, 2006

Subfamily of beetles

Pachyplectrinae is a subfamily of thick scavenger scarab beetles in the family Hybosoridae. There is at least one genus, Pachyplectrus, in Pachyplectrinae.
