= Ceratocanthus aeneus =

Scientific classification
- Kingdom: Animalia
- Phylum: Arthropoda
- Class: Insecta
- Order: Coleoptera
- Suborder: Polyphaga
- Infraorder: Scarabaeiformia
- Family: Hybosoridae
- Genus: Ceratocanthus
- Species: C. aeneus

Binomial name
- Ceratocanthus aeneus (MacLeay, 1819)

Synonyms
- Sphaeromorphus volvox Erichson, 1843

Species of beetle

Ceratocanthus aeneus, known generally as the shining ball scarab beetle or round fungus beetle, is a species of pill scarab beetle in the family Hybosoridae. It is found in North America.
