= Apalonychus rufulus =

Scientific classification
- Kingdom: Animalia
- Phylum: Arthropoda
- Clade: Pancrustacea
- Class: Insecta
- Order: Coleoptera
- Suborder: Polyphaga
- Infraorder: Scarabaeiformia
- Family: Hybosoridae
- Genus: Apalonychus
- Species: A. rufulus

Binomial name
- Apalonychus rufulus (Laporte, 1840)

Species of beetles

Apalonychus rufulus is a species of hybosorid beetle. It was described in 1840 by Laporte as a member of the genus Coilodes. Preudhomme de Borre transferred it to Apalonychus. Arrow considered it synonymous with A. waterhousei. The species has been recorded in the Dominican Republic.
