= Hybosorus orientalis =

Scientific classification
- Kingdom: Animalia
- Phylum: Arthropoda
- Clade: Pancrustacea
- Class: Insecta
- Order: Coleoptera
- Suborder: Polyphaga
- Infraorder: Scarabaeiformia
- Family: Hybosoridae
- Genus: Hybosorus
- Species: H. orientalis

Binomial name
- Hybosorus orientalis Westwood, 1845

Species of beetle

Hybosorus orientalis, is a species of scavenger scarab beetle found in Nepal, Pakistan, India, Sri Lanka, Afghanistan, Myanmar, Sumatra, and Java.

== Description ==
Body length of male is about 11.5 to 12.3 mm. Elongate and oval body with black dorsum and light colored ventrum whereas some individuals with dark reddish brown. Head very closely and rugosely punctate anteriorly. Clypeus is semicircular in circumference, whereas eye-canthus is strongly directed backward. Anterior margin of the labrum consists with nine denticles. Lateral margins of the pronotum is weakly and nearly evenly rounded. Posterior margin of pronotum evenly rounded in middle, but weakly sinuate before the rounded, and blunt posterolateral angles. There are series of shallow punctures at the bottom of lateral marginal ridge. Pronotum dorsum is shiny, with sparse, fine, and circular punctures. Elytra with nine complete striae between suture and humeral umbone, as well as 7 to 8 well developed striae. Hind tibia possess ten stout setae on transverse ridge and external margin. Abdominal sternites are laterally rather densely punctate. Middle of sternites is shiny, with a single transverse series of coarse punctures. Last sternite is impunctate. Most punctures are clothed with yellowish seta. Pygidium is sub-semicircular, shiny, and densely transversely ruguloso-punctate.
