= Phaeochrous compactus =

Scientific classification
- Kingdom: Animalia
- Phylum: Arthropoda
- Class: Insecta
- Order: Coleoptera
- Suborder: Polyphaga
- Infraorder: Scarabaeiformia
- Family: Hybosoridae
- Genus: Phaeochrous
- Species: P. compactus

Binomial name
- Phaeochrous compactus Kuijten, 1978

Species of beetle

Phaeochrous compactus is a species of scavenger scarab beetle endemic to Sri Lanka.

== Description ==
Body length of male is about 8.2 to 9 mm. There are 13 to 20 denticles, and regular striae. The 5th, 9th and 13th interstriae are very weakly heterogeneous. Elytra opaque. In genitalia, left paramere is relatively short, and somewhat triangular. Right paramere consists with well defined ridges and excavations on the external lateral face. Pronotal disc is not completely shining.
