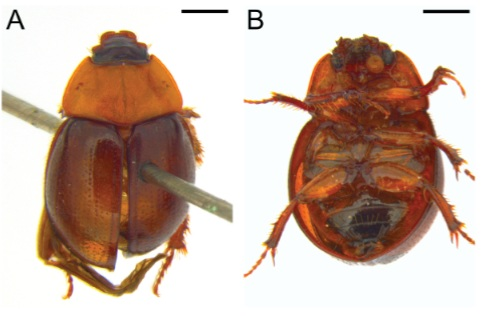

Scientific classification
- Kingdom: Animalia
- Phylum: Arthropoda
- Class: Insecta
- Order: Coleoptera
- Suborder: Polyphaga
- Infraorder: Scarabaeiformia
- Family: Hybosoridae
- Genus: Coilodes
- Species: C. skelleyi

Binomial name
- Coilodes skelleyi Basílio & Vaz-de-Mello, 2023

= Coilodes skelleyi =

Species of beetle

Coilodes skelleyi is a species of beetle of the family Hybosoridae. This species is found in Peru (Loreto) and Brazil (Amazonas).

Adults reach a length of about 5.6 mm (males) and 5.2–6.7 mm (females). The colour of their head, scutellar shield, elytra and legs is dark brown, while the pronotum and venter are yellowish brown.

== Biology ==
This species has been collected in human faeces.

== Etymology ==
The species is named in honour Paul E. Skelley, an aphodiine and erotylid specialist, and collector of most specimens of this species known thus far.
