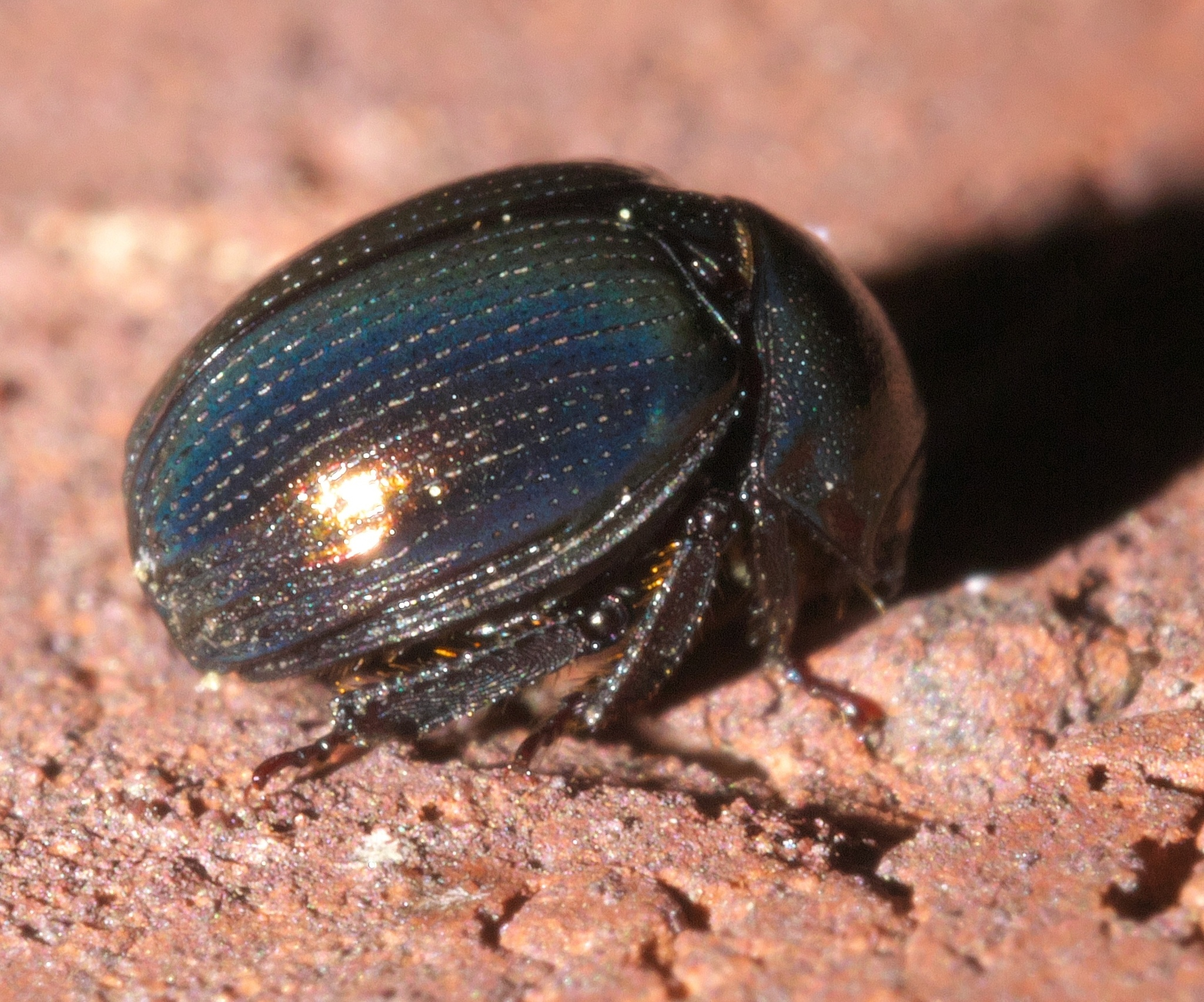

Scientific classification
- Kingdom: Animalia
- Phylum: Arthropoda
- Clade: Pancrustacea
- Class: Insecta
- Order: Coleoptera
- Suborder: Polyphaga
- Infraorder: Scarabaeiformia
- Family: Hybosoridae
- Genus: Germarostes
- Species: G. aphodioides

Binomial name
- Germarostes aphodioides (Illiger, 1800)

Synonyms
- Acanthocerus laevistriatus Germar, 1824; Cloeotus prionomus Say, 1835; Scarabaeus latipes Laporte, 1840; Trox splendidus Bates, 1887

= Germarostes aphodioides =

Species of beetle

Germarostes aphodioides is a species of pill scarab beetle in the family Hybosoridae. It is found in North America.

== Subspecies ==
These two subspecies belong to the species Germarostes aphodioides:

- Germarostes aphodioides aphodioides^{g}
- Germarostes aphodioides prionomus (Bates, 1887)^{c g}

Data sources: i = ITIS, c = Catalogue of Life, g = GBIF, b = Bugguide.net
