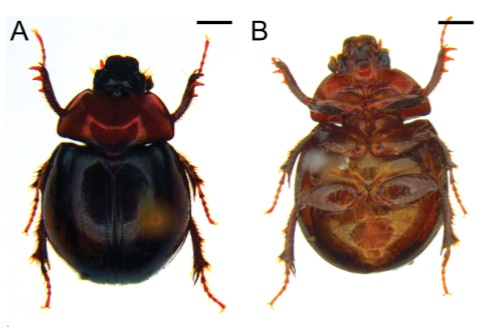

Scientific classification
- Kingdom: Animalia
- Phylum: Arthropoda
- Class: Insecta
- Order: Coleoptera
- Suborder: Polyphaga
- Infraorder: Scarabaeiformia
- Family: Hybosoridae
- Genus: Coilodes
- Species: C. niger

Binomial name
- Coilodes niger (Mannerheim, 1829)

Synonyms
- Hybosorus niger Mannerheim, 1829; Coilodes auger Westwood, 1846

= Coilodes niger =

Species of beetle

Coilodes niger is a species of beetle of the family Hybosoridae. This species is found in Brazil (Rio de Janeiro).

Adults reach a length of about 5.9–7.6 mm (males) and 7 mm (females). The colour of their head and elytra is black, while the pronotum and scutellar shield range from black to red in colour. The venter and legs are dark brown.
