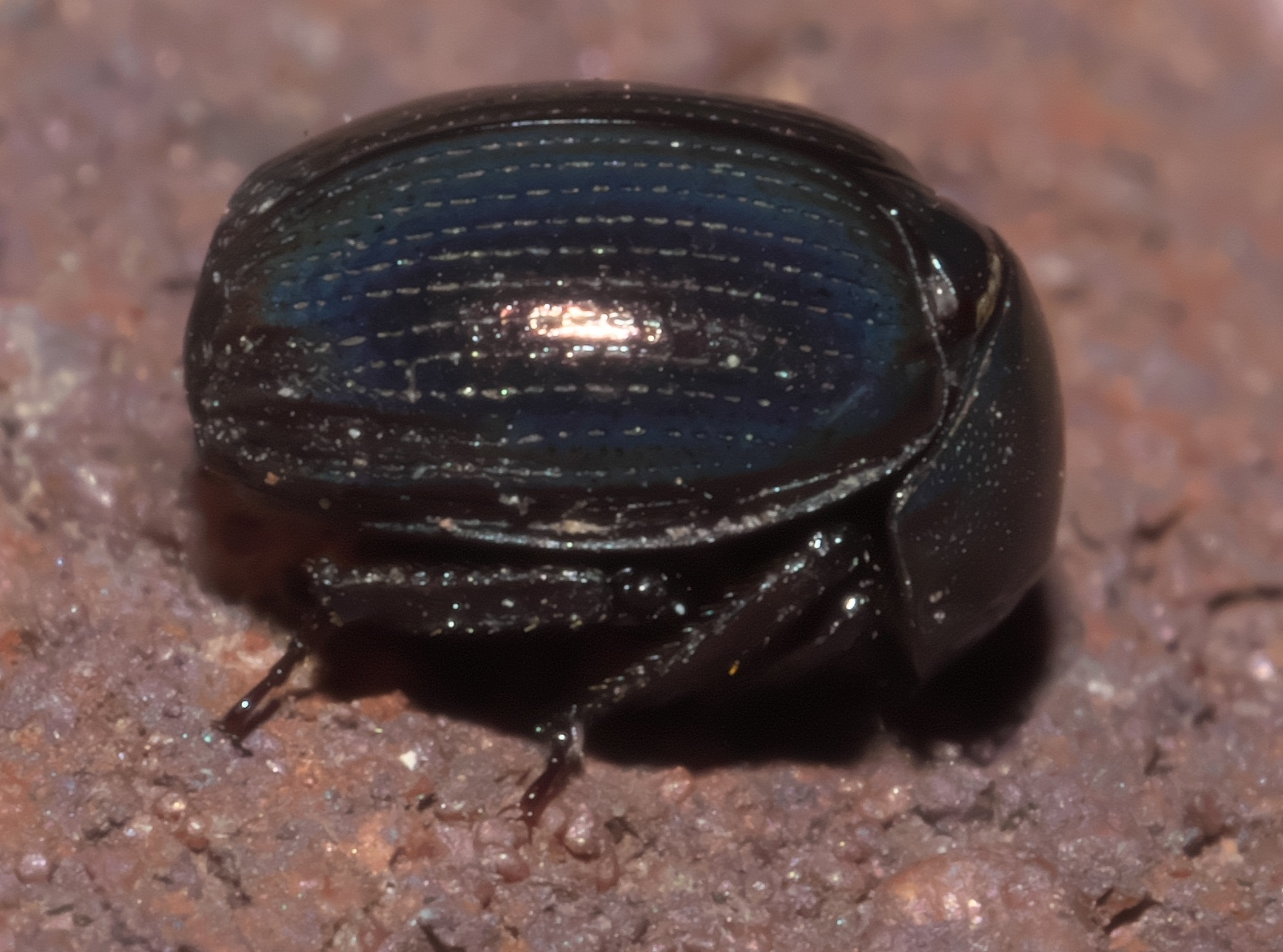
- Germarostes globosus, Oklahoma

Scientific classification
- Kingdom: Animalia
- Phylum: Arthropoda
- Class: Insecta
- Order: Coleoptera
- Suborder: Polyphaga
- Infraorder: Scarabaeiformia
- Family: Hybosoridae
- Genus: Germarostes
- Species: G. globosus

Binomial name
- Germarostes globosus (Say, 1835)

= Germarostes globosus =

Species of beetle

Germarostes globosus is a species of pill scarab beetle in the family Hybosoridae. It is found in North America.
