= Phaeochrous elevatus =

Scientific classification
- Kingdom: Animalia
- Phylum: Arthropoda
- Class: Insecta
- Order: Coleoptera
- Suborder: Polyphaga
- Infraorder: Scarabaeiformia
- Family: Hybosoridae
- Genus: Phaeochrous
- Species: P. elevatus

Binomial name
- Phaeochrous elevatus Kuijten, 1978

Species of beetle

Phaeochrous elevatus is a species of scavenger scarab beetle native to South India and Sri Lanka.

== Description ==
Body length of male is about 10.3 to 10.7 mm. There are 13 denticles in fore tibia and hardly heterogeneous 5th, 9th and 13th interstriae. Characterized by the longer paramere where the tooth is hardly developed. A strongly elevated sharp ridge forms the upper margin of the excavation. Some elytral striae are waving, but less punctured. Pronotal disc with slightly opaque derm. The parameral excavation with elevated upper margin.
