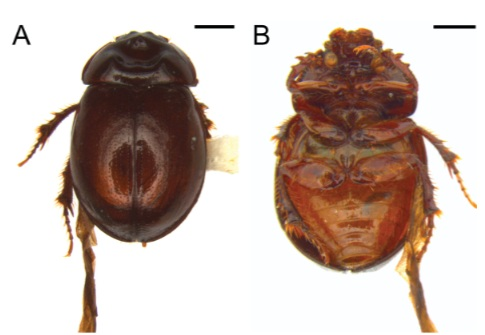

Scientific classification
- Kingdom: Animalia
- Phylum: Arthropoda
- Class: Insecta
- Order: Coleoptera
- Suborder: Polyphaga
- Infraorder: Scarabaeiformia
- Family: Hybosoridae
- Genus: Coilodes
- Species: C. lunae

Binomial name
- Coilodes lunae Basílio & Vaz-de-Mello, 2023

= Coilodes lunae =

Species of beetle

Coilodes lunae is a species of beetle of the family Hybosoridae. This species is found in Brazil (Bahia, Rio de Janeiro).

Adults reach a length of about 6.3 mm (males) and 5.6–6.3 mm (females). The colour of their head and pronotum is black, while the scutellar shield and elytra are dark brown with lighter stains. The legs and venter are fully dark brown.

== Etymology ==
The species is named in honour Luna Basílio Dantas, niece of the first author.
