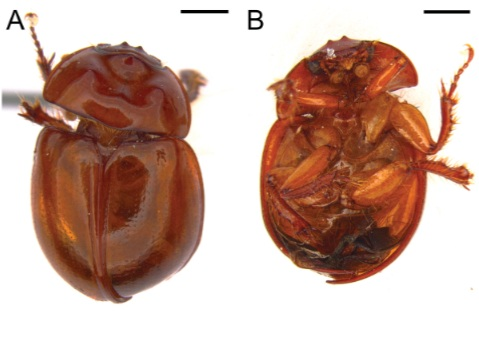

Scientific classification
- Kingdom: Animalia
- Phylum: Arthropoda
- Class: Insecta
- Order: Coleoptera
- Suborder: Polyphaga
- Infraorder: Scarabaeiformia
- Family: Hybosoridae
- Genus: Coilodes
- Species: C. bezerrai

Binomial name
- Coilodes bezerrai Basílio & Vaz-de-Mello, 2023

= Coilodes bezerrai =

Species of beetle

Coilodes bezerrai is a species of beetle of the family Hybosoridae. This species is found in Colombia (Santander).

Adults reach a length of about 5.8–6.3 mm and have a yellowish brown body.

== Biology ==
This species has been collected in faeces of Ateles hybridus and Alouatta seniculus.

== Etymology ==
The species is named in honour of Dr. Eduardo Barbosa Bezerra, entomologist, and professor at Universidade Estadual da Paraíba, Brazil.
