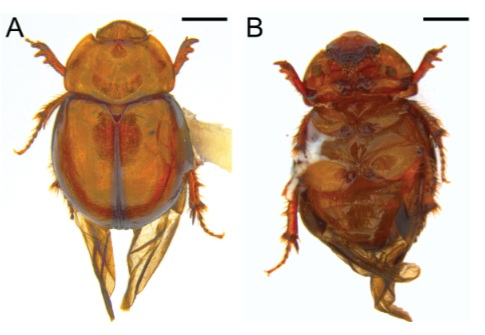

Scientific classification
- Kingdom: Animalia
- Phylum: Arthropoda
- Class: Insecta
- Order: Coleoptera
- Suborder: Polyphaga
- Infraorder: Scarabaeiformia
- Family: Hybosoridae
- Genus: Coilodes
- Species: C. parvulus

Binomial name
- Coilodes parvulus Westwood, 1846

= Coilodes parvulus =

Species of beetle

Coilodes parvulus is a species of beetle of the family Hybosoridae. This species is found in Brazil (Ceará, Bahia, Minas Gerais).

Adults reach a length of about 4.7–5.8 mm (males) and 5.3–6.9 mm (females). The colour of their body ranges from yellowish brown to dark brown, with the elytral inner and outer margins black.

== Biology ==
This species has been collected in human faeces.
