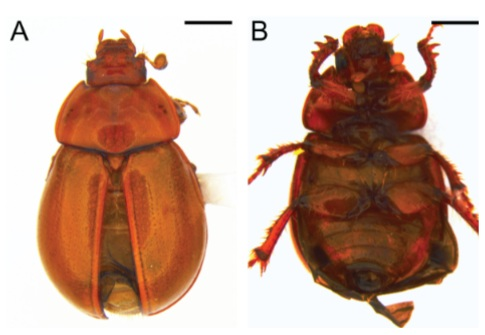

Scientific classification
- Kingdom: Animalia
- Phylum: Arthropoda
- Class: Insecta
- Order: Coleoptera
- Suborder: Polyphaga
- Infraorder: Scarabaeiformia
- Family: Hybosoridae
- Genus: Coilodes
- Species: C. ovalis

Binomial name
- Coilodes ovalis Robinson, 1948

= Coilodes ovalis =

Species of beetle

Coilodes ovalis is a species of beetle of the family Hybosoridae. This species is found in Colombia, Trinidad and Tobago and Venezuela.

Adults reach a length of about 5.5–6.7 mm (males) and 5.2–7.1 mm (females). The colour of their body ranges from yellowish brown to dark brown. Specimens sometimes have darker spots.

== Biology ==
This species has been collected in human and bovine faeces, as well as in chicken meat.
