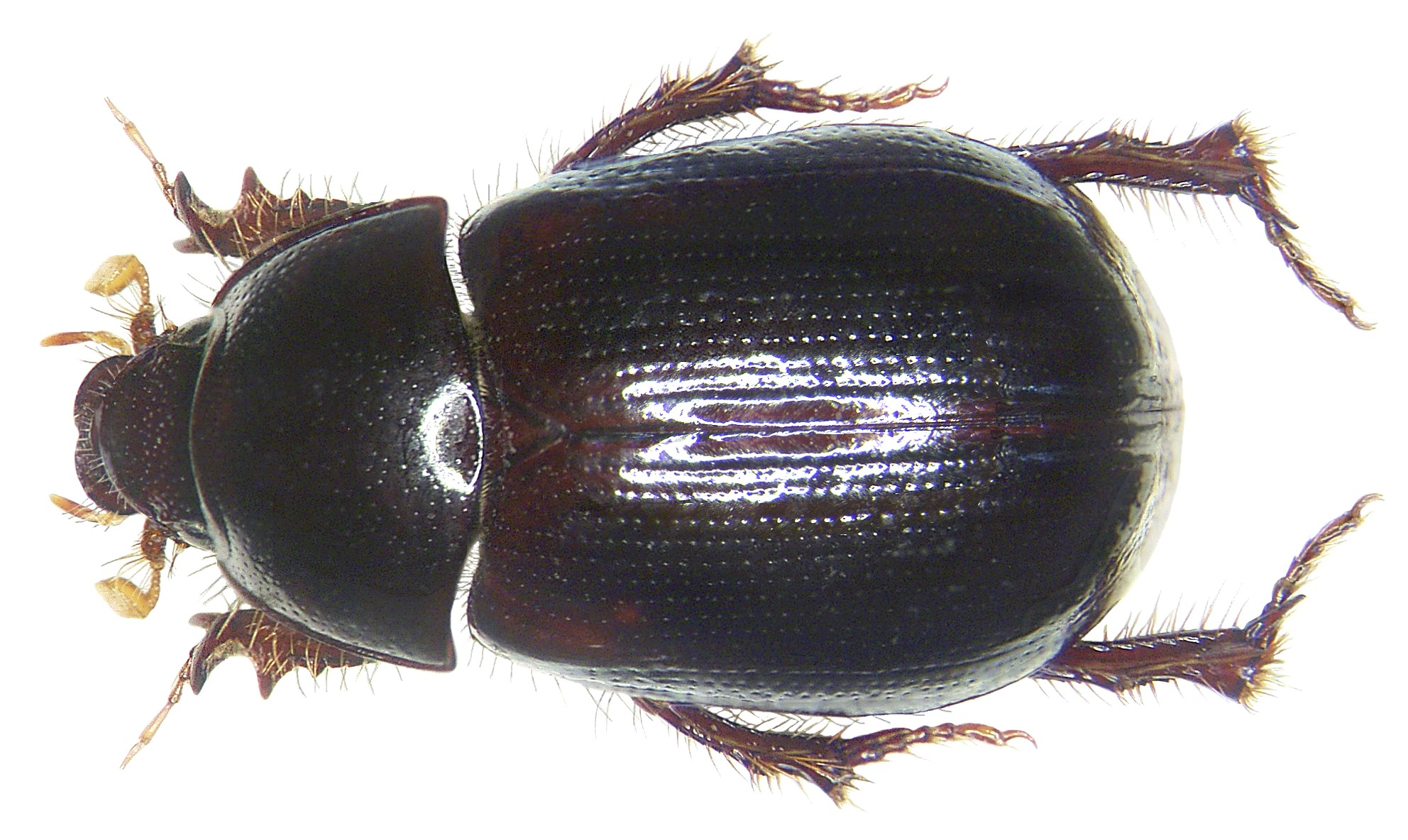

Scientific classification
- Kingdom: Animalia
- Phylum: Arthropoda
- Class: Insecta
- Order: Coleoptera
- Suborder: Polyphaga
- Infraorder: Scarabaeiformia
- Family: Hybosoridae
- Genus: Hybosorus
- Species: H. roei

Binomial name
- Hybosorus roei Westwood, 1845

Synonyms
- Hybosorus illigeri Reiche, 1853; Hybosorus nitidus Lansberge, 1882; Hybosorus nossibianus Fairmaire, 1895; Hybosorus palearcticus Endrödi, 1957

= Hybosorus roei =

Species of beetle

Hybosorus roei is a species of scavenger scarab beetle in the family Hybosoridae. It is found in North America. Adults feed on carrion in its early stages of decomposition of both vertebrae and invertebrate. Their size ranges from 7–9 mm.

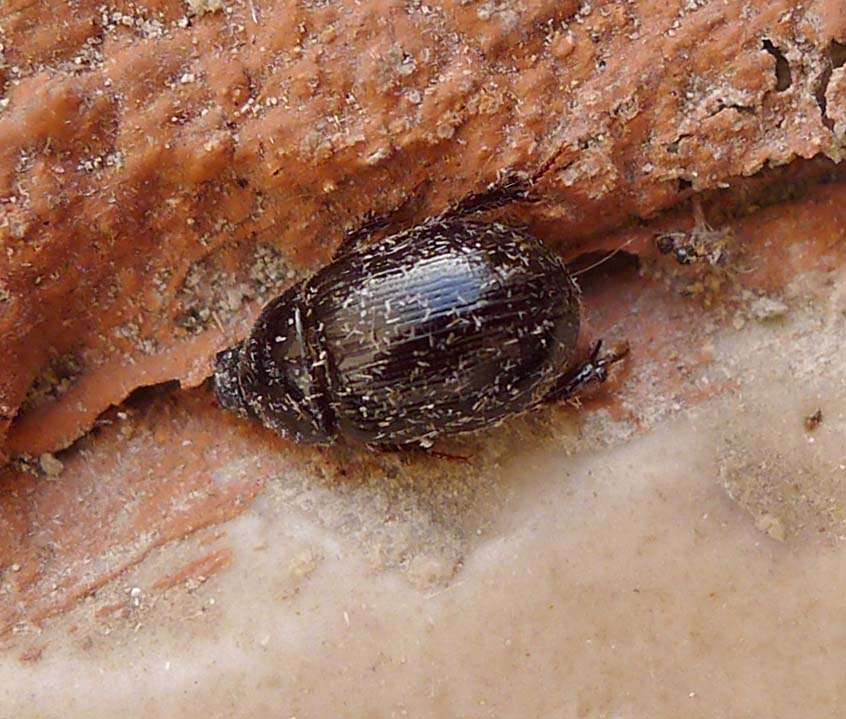
