= Ceratocanthus =

Scientific classification
- Domain: Eukaryota
- Kingdom: Animalia
- Phylum: Arthropoda
- Class: Insecta
- Order: Coleoptera
- Suborder: Polyphaga
- Infraorder: Scarabaeiformia
- Family: Hybosoridae
- Subfamily: Ceratocanthinae
- Genus: Ceratocanthus; White, 1842

Synonyms
- Gymnoropterus Gestro, 1899; Sphaeromorphus Germar, 1843

Genus of beetles

Ceratocanthus is a genus of pill scarab beetles in the family Hybosoridae. There are more than 50 described species in Ceratocanthus.

== Species ==
These 53 species belong to the genus Ceratocanthus:

- Ceratocanthus aeneus (MacLeay, 1819) (shining ball scarab beetle)
- Ceratocanthus amazonicus Paulian, 1982
- Ceratocanthus aureolus (Harold, 1874)
- Ceratocanthus baniensis Howden, 1978
- Ceratocanthus basilicus (Germar, 1843)
- Ceratocanthus bicinctoides Paulian, 1982
- Ceratocanthus bicinctus (Erichson, 1843)
- Ceratocanthus bonfilsi Chalumeau, 1977
- Ceratocanthus brasiliensis (Lansberge, 1887)
- Ceratocanthus chalceus (Germar, 1843)
- Ceratocanthus clypealis (Lansberge, 1887)
- Ceratocanthus ebeninus (Erichson, 1843)
- Ceratocanthus eberti Paulian, 1982
- Ceratocanthus eulampros (Bates, 1887)
- Ceratocanthus fuscoviridis (Ohaus, 1911)
- Ceratocanthus globulus (Erichson, 1843)
- Ceratocanthus gundlachi (Harold, 1874)
- Ceratocanthus humeralis (Erichson, 1843)
- Ceratocanthus inca Paulian, 1982
- Ceratocanthus major Paulian, 1982
- Ceratocanthus mathani Paulian, 1982
- Ceratocanthus micans (Harold, 1874)
- Ceratocanthus micros (Bates, 1887)
- Ceratocanthus monrosi (Martinez & Pereira, 1959)
- Ceratocanthus nanus (Germar, 1843)
- Ceratocanthus niger Paulian, 1982
- Ceratocanthus nitidus (Germar, 1843)
- Ceratocanthus pararelucens Howden, 1978
- Ceratocanthus pauliani (Delgado & Hernandez, 1998)
- Ceratocanthus pecki Paulian, 1982
- Ceratocanthus perpunctatus Paulian, 1982
- Ceratocanthus politus (Erichson, 1843)
- Ceratocanthus pseudosuturalis Paulian, 1982
- Ceratocanthus punctolineatus Paulian, 1982
- Ceratocanthus punctulatus (Lansberge, 1887)
- Ceratocanthus pyritosus (Erichson, 1843)
- Ceratocanthus quadristriatus Paulian & Vaz-de-mello, 1998
- Ceratocanthus relucens (Bates, 1887)
- Ceratocanthus rotundicollis (Bates, 1887)
- Ceratocanthus semipunctatus (Germar, 1843)
- Ceratocanthus semistriatus (Germar, 1843)
- Ceratocanthus seriatus (Erichson, 1843)
- Ceratocanthus sesquistriatus (Germar, 1843)
- Ceratocanthus sexstriatus Paulian, 1982
- Ceratocanthus spinicornis (Fabricius, 1775)
- Ceratocanthus steinbachi Paulian, 1982
- Ceratocanthus striatulus (Lansberge, 1887)
- Ceratocanthus suturalis (Lansberge, 1887)
- Ceratocanthus suturaloides Paulian, 1982
- Ceratocanthus termiticola (Wasmann, 1894)
- Ceratocanthus turquinensis (Zayas, 1988)
- Ceratocanthus undulatus (Harold, 1874)
- Ceratocanthus vicarius (Bates, 1887)
