= T. rex (disambiguation) =

Tyrannosaurus rex is a species of dinosaur.

T. Rex or T-Rex may also refer to:

== Biology ==
- Tachyoryctes rex, the king mole rat, a rodent species found high on Mount Kenya
- Thoristella rex, a sea snail species endemic to New Zealand
- Trialeurodes rex, a whitefly species found on Sulawesi
- Tropidoptera rex, a probably extinct snail species endemic to Oahu
- Tylosaurus rex, a fossil mosasaur species from Texas, United States
- Tyrannasorus rex, a fossil beetle species from the Miocene epoch
- Tyrannobdella rex, a leech species found in South America
- Tyrannochthonius rex, a pseudoscorpion species found in Australia
- Tyrannomolpus rex, a leaf beetle species endemic to New Zealand
- Tyrannomyrmex rex, an ant species found in Southeast Asia

== Arts, entertainment, and media ==
=== Music ===
==== Groups and labels ====
- T. Rex (band), a 1970s glam rock band (previously Tyrannosaurus Rex. a 1960s psychedelic folk duo) headed by Marc Bolan
- Mickey Finn's T-Rex, a tribute band to the 1970s glam rock band, formed by members of the original band
- X-T. Rex, formerly Bill Legend's T.Rex, another tribute band to the 1970s glam rock band, formed by Bill Legend, another member of the original band
- T.Rex Wax Company, record label owned by Marc Bolan which released his band's recordings from 1972 onwards

==== Other uses in music ====
- T. Rex (album), a 1970 studio album by the 1970s band
- "T-Rex [Jurassic Park]", a song by Basshunter from The Old Shit album

=== Other uses in arts, entertainment, and media ===
- T-Rex, the main character of Dinosaur Comics
- The Adventures of T-Rex, an American animated television series
- Theodore Rex (film), starring Whoopi Goldberg
- T-Rex, a toy in Big & Small

== Brands and enterprises ==
- .577 T-Rex, .577 Tyrannosaur, a very large and powerful rifle cartridge developed for "stopping rifles" intended to stop the charge of dangerous game
- T-Rex Engineering, a guitar effect pedal manufacturer

== Sports teams ==
- dmedia T-REX, a defunct Chinese Professional Baseball League team
- Tupelo T-Rex, a defunct American ice hockey team

== Vehicles ==
- Bremach T-Rex, a multi-purpose truck manufactured in Italy
- Campagna T-Rex, a two-seat, three-wheeled vehicle manufactured in Canada
- Dodge T-Rex, a 6x6 concept vehicle
- T-Rex (tank), a Ukrainian main battle tank in development

== Other uses ==
- T-Rex Cafe, a restaurant chain at Disney Springs in Lake Buena Vista, Florida
- T-REX (web server), developed at the Université du Québec à Montréal, Canada
- T-REX Project, a Colorado Department of Transportation project
- T-REx cell lines, a proprietary cell line system using tetracycline-controlled transcriptional activation

== See also ==
- Terex, a construction equipment manufacturer
- Trex (disambiguation)
- Regulatory T cell, commonly abbreviated as "Tregs"
