= Anaidinae =

Scientific classification
- Kingdom: Animalia
- Phylum: Arthropoda
- Clade: Pancrustacea
- Class: Insecta
- Order: Coleoptera
- Suborder: Polyphaga
- Infraorder: Scarabaeiformia
- Family: Hybosoridae
- Subfamily: Anaidinae; Nikolajev, 1996

Type genus
- Anaides Westwood, 1845

Synonyms
- Anaidini Nikolajev, 1996; Cryptogeniini Howden, 2001

Subfamily of beetles

Anaidinae is a subfamily of the scarabaeoid beetle family Hybosoridae. It presently includes 6 extant genera and 3 fossil genera.

== Genera ==
- Anaides Westwood, 1845
- Callosides Howden, 1971
- Chaetodus Westwood, 1845
- Cryptogenius Westwood, 1845
- Hybochaetodus Arrow, 1909
- Totoia Ocampo, 2003

=== Extinct genera ===
- †Crassisorus
- †Cretanaides
- †Protanaides
