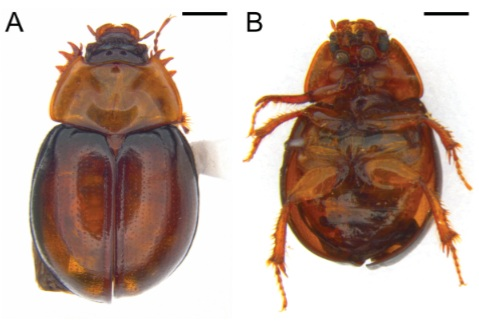

Scientific classification
- Kingdom: Animalia
- Phylum: Arthropoda
- Class: Insecta
- Order: Coleoptera
- Suborder: Polyphaga
- Infraorder: Scarabaeiformia
- Family: Hybosoridae
- Genus: Coilodes
- Species: C. castaneus

Binomial name
- Coilodes castaneus Westwood, 1846

Synonyms
- Coilodes nigripennis Arrow, 1903; Gnombolbus orosi Prokofiev, 2013

= Coilodes castaneus =

Species of beetle

Coilodes castaneus is a species of beetle of the family Hybosoridae. This species is found in Nicaragua, Costa Rica, Panama, Saint Vincent and the Grenadines, Colombia and Ecuador.

Adults reach a length of about 5.6–6.9 mm. Their head and scutellar shield are dark brown with black stains, while the pronotum, legs and venter are yellowish brown. The colour of the elytra ranges from dark brown to yellowish brown with its elytra base black. Some specimens have a uniformly yellowish brown body, with the elytra base black or dark brown.

== Biology ==
This species has been collected in carcasses of vertebrates (sloth, hedgehog, rat, lizard, frog, and fish) and invertebrates (shrimp, squid and earthworm), human faeces, the dung of monkeys, coatis and tapirs, as well as rotten fruit and fungi. It was also observed in association with colonies of Eciton burchelli.
