= Anopsiostes =

Scientific classification
- Kingdom: Animalia
- Phylum: Arthropoda
- Class: Insecta
- Order: Coleoptera
- Suborder: Polyphaga
- Infraorder: Scarabaeiformia
- Family: Hybosoridae
- Subfamily: Ceratocanthinae
- Genus: Anopsiostes; Paulian, 1982

Species
- Species: Anopsiostes pauliani; Anopsiostes punctatus

Genus of beetles

Anopsiostes is a genus of beetles in the family Hybosoridae, described as a genus in 1982. It has two species: Anopsiostes punctatus, which is restricted to Ecuador, and Anopsiostes pauliani, which was discovered in Mexico.
