= Apalonychus waterhousei =

Scientific classification
- Kingdom: Animalia
- Phylum: Arthropoda
- Clade: Pancrustacea
- Class: Insecta
- Order: Coleoptera
- Suborder: Polyphaga
- Infraorder: Scarabaeiformia
- Family: Hybosoridae
- Genus: Apalonychus
- Species: A. waterhousei

Binomial name
- Apalonychus waterhousei Westwood, 1846

Species of beetles

Apalonychus waterhousei is a species of hybosorid beetle. It is the type species of the genus Apalonychus. It was once considered synonymous with A. rufulus. It occurs in Cuba and the Dominican Republic.
