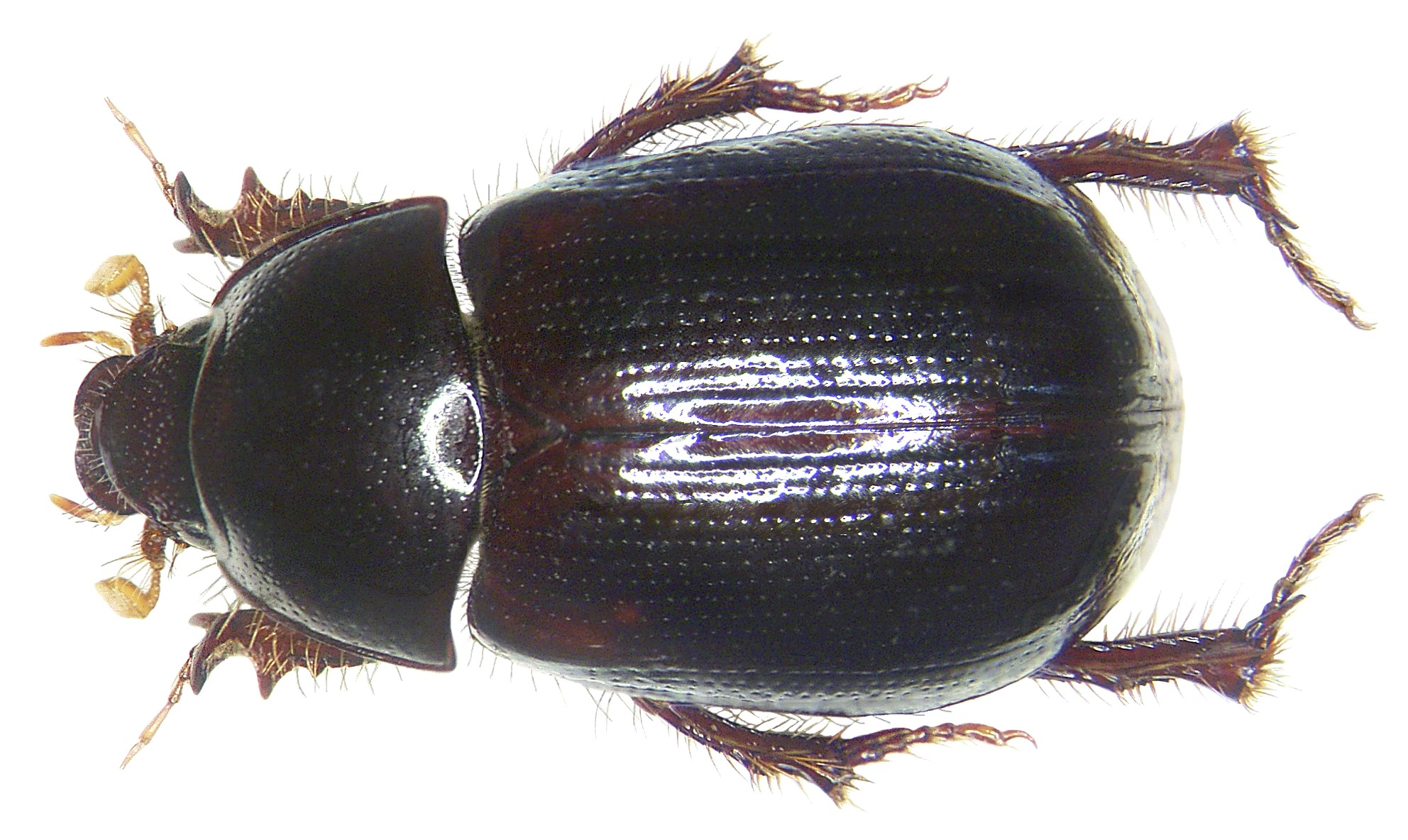
- Hybosorus roei

Scientific classification
- Domain: Eukaryota
- Kingdom: Animalia
- Phylum: Arthropoda
- Class: Insecta
- Order: Coleoptera
- Suborder: Polyphaga
- Infraorder: Scarabaeiformia
- Family: Hybosoridae
- Subfamily: Hybosorinae
- Genus: Hybosorus; MacLeay, 1819

= Hybosorus =

Hybosorus Temporal range: Cenomanian–Recent

Genus of beetles

Hybosorus is a genus of scavenger scarab beetles in the family Hybosoridae. There are about eight described species in Hybosorus.

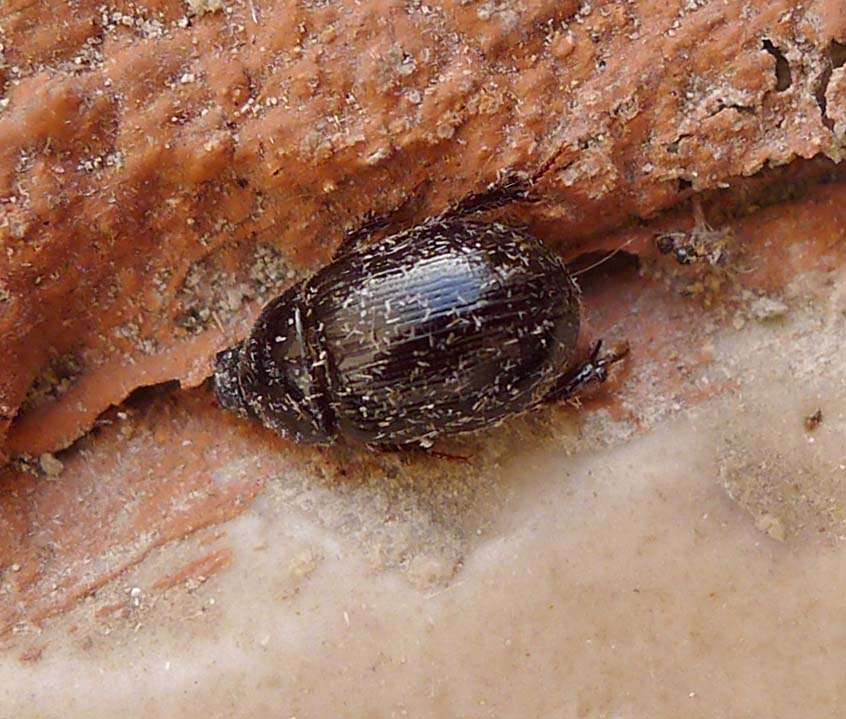
Hybosorus roei

== Species ==
- Hybosorus crassus Klug, 1855
- Hybosorus curtulus Fairmaire, 1887
- Hybosorus laportei Westwood, 1845
- Hybosorus orientalis Westwood, 1845
- Hybosorus roei Westwood, 1845 (= illigeri)
- Hybosorus ruficornis Boheman, 1857

=== Extinct species ===
- †Hybosorus lividus Heer 1862 Upper Freshwater-Molasse Formation, Germany, Miocene
- †Hybosorus ocampoi Bai and Zhang 2016 Burmese amber, Myanmar, Cenomanian
