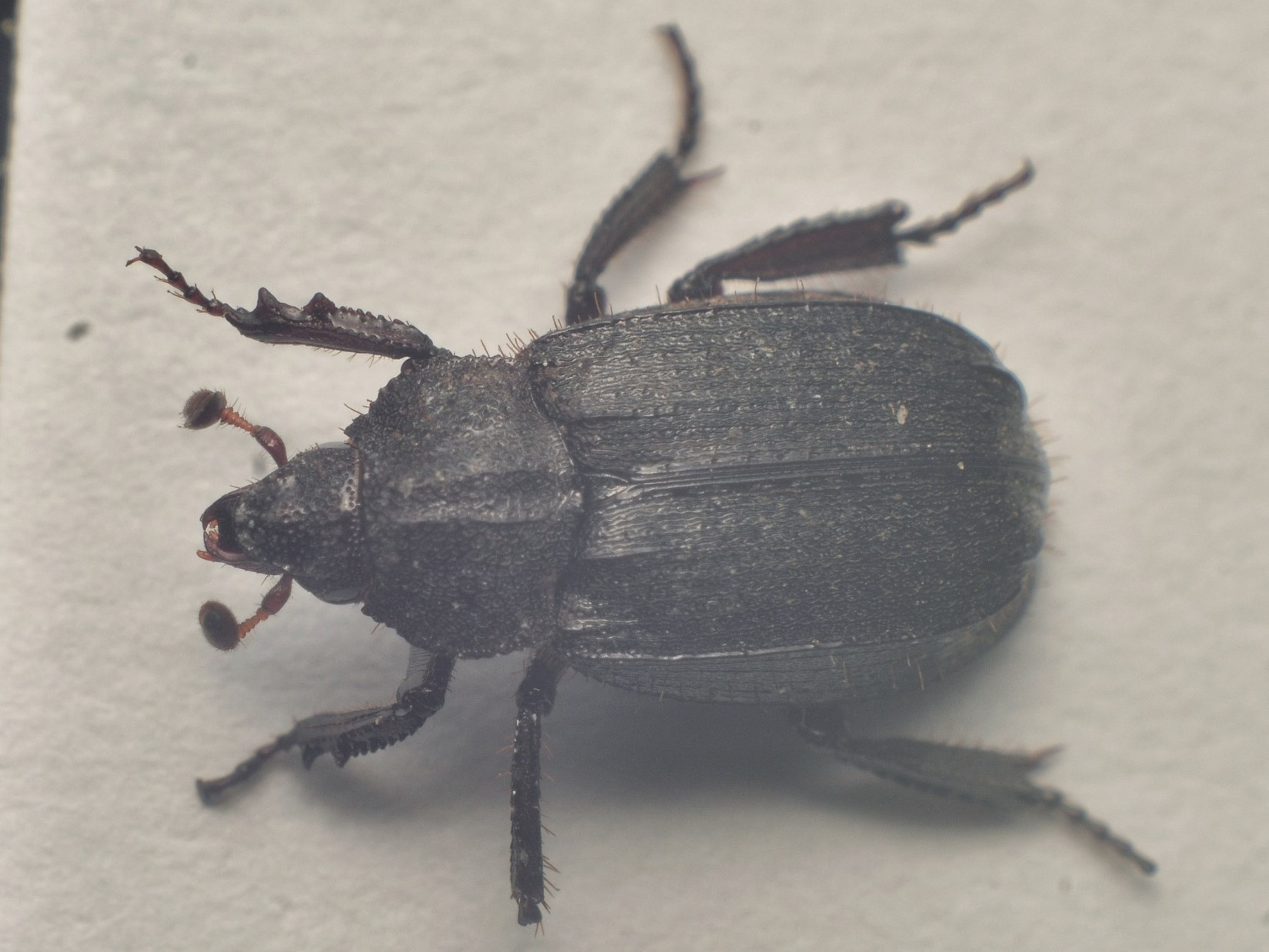
- Anaides fossulatus

Scientific classification
- Kingdom: Animalia
- Phylum: Arthropoda
- Class: Insecta
- Order: Coleoptera
- Suborder: Polyphaga
- Infraorder: Scarabaeiformia
- Family: Hybosoridae
- Subfamily: Anaidinae
- Genus: Anaides; Westwood, 1845

= Anaides =

Genus of beetles

Anaides is a genus of scavenger scarab beetles in the family Hybosoridae.

== Species ==
- Anaides carioca Ocampo
- Anaides fossulatus Westwood
- Anaides laticollis Harold
- Anaides longeciliatus Balthasar
- Anaides onofrii Ocampo
- Anaides ortii Ocampo
- Anaides parvulus Ocampo
- Anaides planus Ocampo
- Anaides quinckei Ocampo
- Anaides rugosus Robinson
- Anaides simplicicollis Bates
- Anaides vartorellii Ocampo
