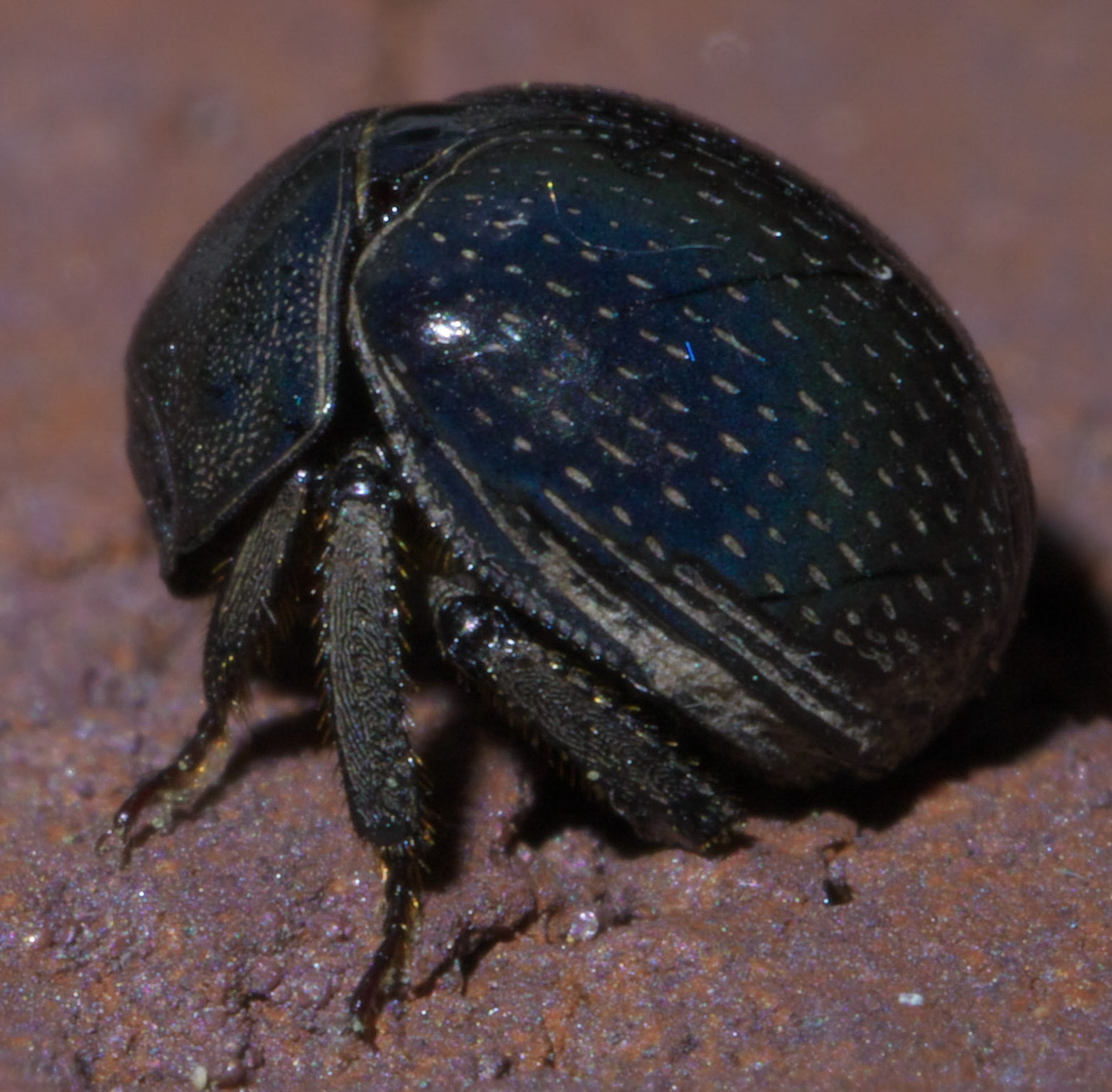

Scientific classification
- Kingdom: Animalia
- Phylum: Arthropoda
- Class: Insecta
- Order: Coleoptera
- Suborder: Polyphaga
- Infraorder: Scarabaeiformia
- Family: Hybosoridae
- Tribe: Ceratocanthini
- Genus: Germarostes; Paulian, 1982

= Germarostes =

Genus of beetles

Germarostes is a genus of pill scarab beetles in the family Hybosoridae. There are at least 70 described species in Germarostes.

== Species ==
These 72 species belong to the genus Germarostes:

- Germarostes abruptus (Petrovitz, 1973)^{c g}
- Germarostes allorgei (Paulian, 1947)^{c g}
- Germarostes anchicayae Paulian, 1982^{c g}
- Germarostes antiquus (Erichson, 1843)^{c g}
- Germarostes aphodioides (Illiger, 1800)^{i c g b}
- Germarostes argentinus (Ohaus, 1911)^{c g}
- Germarostes batesi (Harold, 1874)^{c g}
- Germarostes bidens (Bates, 1887)^{c g}
- Germarostes brunnipes (Germar, 1843)^{c g}
- Germarostes bugabensis (Arrow, 1903)^{c g}
- Germarostes carinatus (Paulian, 1982)^{c}
- Germarostes carltoni Howden & Gill, 2005^{c g}
- Germarostes columbianus Paulian, 1982^{c g}
- Germarostes costulatus Paulian, 1982^{c g}
- Germarostes crassicollis (Arrow, 1903)^{c}
- Germarostes degallieri Paulian, 1982^{c g}
- Germarostes diffundus (Petrovitz, 1976)^{c g}
- Germarostes ecuadoricus Paulian, 1982^{c g}
- Germarostes ecuadoriensis (Petrovitz, 1976)^{c g}
- Germarostes emarginatus (Poinar, 2014)^{c g}
- Germarostes excisus (Bates, 1887)^{c g}
- Germarostes farri (Howden, 1970)^{c g}
- Germarostes gaujoni Paulian, 1982^{c g}
- Germarostes geayi Paulian, 1982^{c g}
- Germarostes globosus (Say, 1835)^{i c g b}
- Germarostes guyanensis Paulian, 1982^{c g}
- Germarostes hamiger (Ohaus, 1911)^{c g}
- Germarostes haroldi (Arrow, 1911)^{c g}
- Germarostes heterodynamus Paulian, 1982^{c g}
- Germarostes howdenicus Paulian, 1982^{c g}
- Germarostes indigaceus (Germar, 1843)^{c g}
- Germarostes infantulus (Bates, 1887)^{c g}
- Germarostes instriatus Paulian, 1982^{c g}
- Germarostes jamaicensis (Howden, 1978)^{c g}
- Germarostes leprieuri (Germar, 1843)^{c g}
- Germarostes leticiae Paulian, 1982^{c g}
- Germarostes macleayi (Perty, 1830)^{c g}
- Germarostes madeiranus Paulian, 1982^{c g}
- Germarostes malkini Paulian, 1982^{c g}
- Germarostes metallicus (Harold, 1874)^{c g}
- Germarostes nasutus (Bates, 1887)^{c g}
- Germarostes nigerrimus (Blanchard, 1846)^{c g}
- Germarostes nitens (Guérin-Méneville, 1839)^{c g}
- Germarostes oberthuri Paulian, 1982^{c g}
- Germarostes osellai Ballerio & Gill, 2008^{c g}
- Germarostes otonga Ballerio & Gill, 2008^{c g}
- Germarostes pauliani (Chalumeau & Cambefort, 1976)^{c g}
- Germarostes pecki (Howden, 1970)^{c g}
- Germarostes plicatus (Germar, 1843)^{c g}
- Germarostes posticus (Germar, 1843)^{c g}
- Germarostes pullus Paulian, 1982^{c g}
- Germarostes puncticollis (Erichson, 1843)^{c g}
- Germarostes punctulatus (Ohaus, 1911)^{c g}
- Germarostes pusillus (Castelnau, 1840)^{c g}
- Germarostes pustulosus (Lansberge, 1887)^{c g}
- Germarostes reticularis (Bates, 1887)^{c g}
- Germarostes rotundatus Paulian, 1982^{c g}
- Germarostes rufopiceus (Arrow, 1903)^{c g}
- Germarostes rugatus (Germar, 1843)^{c g}
- Germarostes rugiceps (Germar, 1843)^{c g}
- Germarostes salesiacus Paulian, 1982^{c g}
- Germarostes semituberculatus (Germar, 1843)^{c g}
- Germarostes senegalensis (Castelnau, 1840)^{c}
- Germarostes sinuatus (Bates, 1887)^{c g}
- Germarostes sticticus (Erichson, 1843)^{c g}
- Germarostes strigilateris (Bates, 1887)^{c g}
- Germarostes sulcipennis (Harold, 1875)^{c g}
- Germarostes tibialis (Petrovitz, 1973)^{c g}
- Germarostes tubericauda (Bates, 1891)^{c g}
- Germarostes viridipennis (Bates, 1887)^{c g}
- Germarostes viridis (Lansberge, 1887)^{c g}
- Germarostes viridulus (Bates, 1887)^{c g}

Data sources: i = ITIS, c = Catalogue of Life, g = GBIF, b = Bugguide.net
