= Procoilodes =

Procoilodes Temporal range: Miocene

Scientific classification
- Kingdom: Animalia
- Phylum: Arthropoda
- Clade: Pancrustacea
- Class: Insecta
- Order: Coleoptera
- Suborder: Polyphaga
- Infraorder: Scarabaeiformia
- Family: Hybosoridae
- Genus: †Procoilodes; Ocampo, 2002
- Species: †P. adrastus

Binomial name
- †Procoilodes adrastus Ocampo, 2002

Extinct species of beetle

Procoilodes adrastus is an extinct species of hybosorid beetle. It is the only species in the genus Procoilodes.
