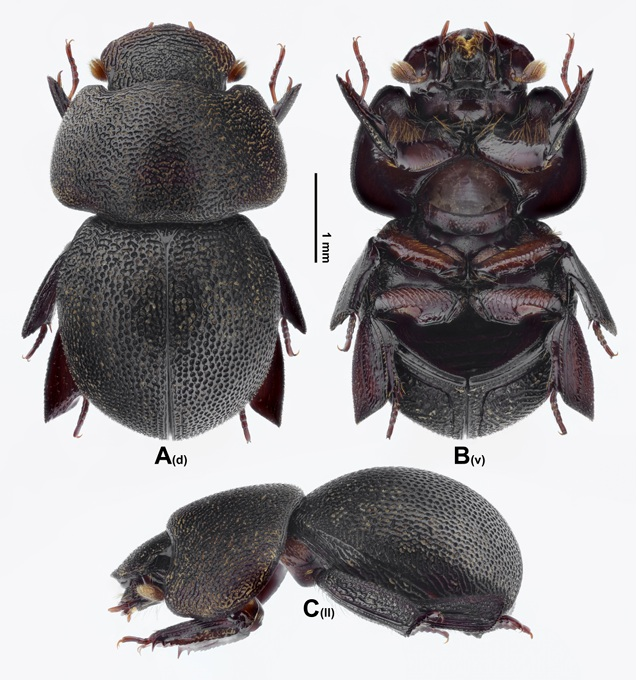
- Madrasostes lini

Scientific classification
- Domain: Eukaryota
- Kingdom: Animalia
- Phylum: Arthropoda
- Class: Insecta
- Order: Coleoptera
- Suborder: Polyphaga
- Infraorder: Scarabaeiformia
- Family: Hybosoridae
- Genus: Madrasostes; Paulian, 1975

= Madrasostes =

Genus of beetles

Madrasostes is a genus of scavenger scarab beetles in the family Hybosoridae.

== Selected species ==
- Madrasostes lini Wang, 2025
- Madrasostes nigrum Paulian, 1975
