= Pachyplectrus =

Scientific classification
- Kingdom: Animalia
- Phylum: Arthropoda
- Class: Insecta
- Order: Coleoptera
- Suborder: Polyphaga
- Infraorder: Scarabaeiformia
- Family: Hybosoridae
- Genus: Pachyplectrus; LeConte, 1874
- Species: P. laevis

Binomial name
- Pachyplectrus laevis LeConte, 1874

Genus of beetles

Pachyplectrus is a genus of thick scavenger scarab beetles in the family Hybosoridae containing one described species, P. laevis.
