= Apalonychus =

Scientific classification
- Kingdom: Animalia
- Phylum: Arthropoda
- Clade: Pancrustacea
- Class: Insecta
- Order: Coleoptera
- Suborder: Polyphaga
- Infraorder: Scarabaeiformia
- Family: Hybosoridae
- Genus: Apalonychus; Westwood, 1845

Synonyms
- Hapalonychus (misspelled by Lacordaire 1856); Haplonychus (misspelled by Petrovitz (1973); Trichops Val, 1853

Genus of beetles

Apalonychus is a genus of scavenger scarab beetles (Hybosoridae). It consists of the following species:

- Apalonychus nattereri Petrovitz, 1973, native to Brazil
- Apalonychus pusillus Arrow, 1911, native to Paraguay
- Apalonychus rufulus (Laporte, 1840), native to the Dominican Republic
- Apalonychus waterhousei Westwood, 1846 , native to Cuba and the Dominican Republic

A. waterhousei is the type species of the genus.
