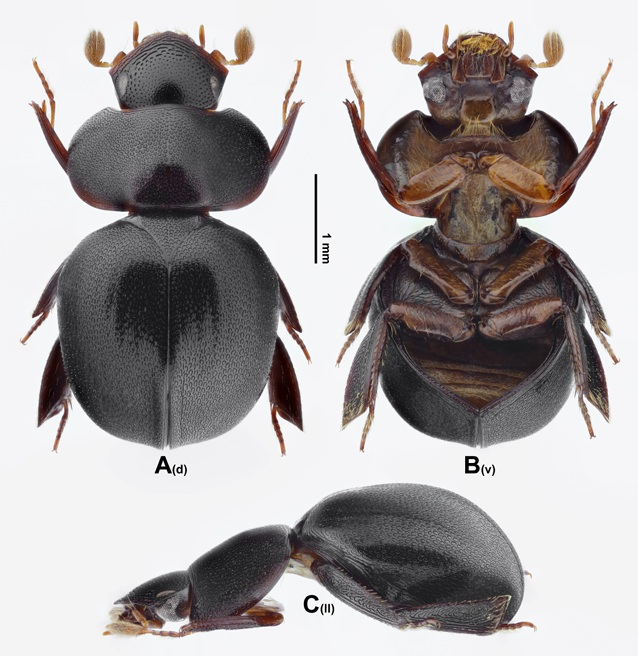
- Cyphopisthes erlangshen

Scientific classification
- Domain: Eukaryota
- Kingdom: Animalia
- Phylum: Arthropoda
- Class: Insecta
- Order: Coleoptera
- Suborder: Polyphaga
- Infraorder: Scarabaeiformia
- Family: Hybosoridae
- Genus: Cyphopisthes; Gestro, 1899

= Cyphopisthes =

Genus of beetles

Cyphopisthes is a genus of scavenger scarab beetles in the family Hybosoridae.

== Selected species ==
- Cyphopisthes amphicyllis (Sharp, 1875)
- Cyphopisthes erlangshen Wang, 2025
