= TREX2 =

Protein-coding gene in the species Homo sapiens

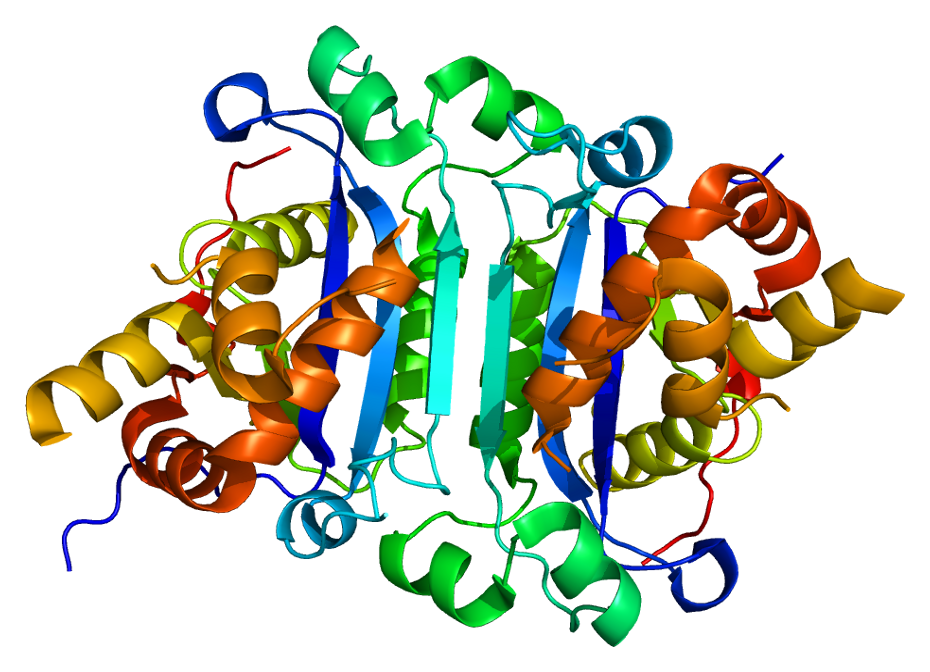

Identifiers
- Aliases: TREX2, three prime repair exonuclease 2
- External IDs: OMIM: 300370; MGI: 1346343; GeneCards: TREX2
Available structures
| PDB | Ortholog search: PDBe RCSB |
| PDB | List of PDB id codes 1Y97 |
Enzyme activity
| EC # | BRENDA | ExPASy | KEGG | MetaCyc |
|---|---|---|---|---|
| 3.1.11.2 | ↗ | ↗ | ↗ | ↗ |

Gene location (Human)
| Chr. | X chromosome (human) |
| Band | Xq28 | Start | 153,444,473 bp |
| Band | Xq28 | End | 153,470,587 bp |

Gene location (Mouse)
| Chr. | X chromosome (mouse) |
| Band | X|X A7.3 | Start | 72,477,311 bp |
| Band | X|X A7.3 | End | 72,478,950 bp |
RNA expression pattern
| Bgee | Human / Mouse (ortholog); Top expressed in: skin of abdomen; skin of leg; ascending aorta; Descending thoracic aorta; right coronary artery; tibial arteries; granulocyte; left coronary artery; ectocervix; spleen / Top expressed in: esophagus; lip; embryo; embryo; skin of external ear; skin of abdomen; submandibular gland; skin of back; stomach; umbilical cord; More reference expression data |
| BioGPS | n/a |
Gene ontology
| Molecular function | nuclease activity; exodeoxyribonuclease III activity; exonuclease activity; hydrolase activity; protein homodimerization activity; magnesium ion binding; 3'-5'-exodeoxyribonuclease activity; metal ion binding; nucleic acid binding; 3'-5' exonuclease activity |
| Cellular component | nucleus |
| Biological process | DNA repair; cellular response to DNA damage stimulus; nucleic acid phosphodiester bond hydrolysis; DNA metabolic process |
Sources:Amigo / QuickGO
Orthologs
| Databases | NCBI: entry; OMA: entry |
| Species | Human | Mouse |
| Entrez | 11219 | 24102 |
| Ensembl | ENSG00000183479 | ENSMUSG00000031372 |
| UniProt | Q9BQ50 | Q9R1A9 |
| RefSeq (mRNA) | NM_080701; NM_080699; NM_080700 | NM_011907 |
| RefSeq (protein) | NP_542432 | NP_036037 |
| Location (UCSC) | Chr X: 153.44 – 153.47 Mb | Chr X: 72.48 – 72.48 Mb |
| PubMed search |
- Wikidata
| View/Edit Human | View/Edit Mouse |

Three prime repair exonuclease 2 is an enzyme that in humans is encoded by the TREX2 gene.

== Function ==
This gene encodes a protein with 3' exonuclease activity. Enzymes with this activity are involved in DNA replication, repair, and recombination. Similarity to an E. coli protein suggests that this enzyme may be a subunit of DNA polymerase III, which does not have intrinsic exonuclease activity.

Newer research has determined that TREX2 is also involved in flap endonuclease activity, as detected in the context of inhibiting gene-editing nickases that generate an extension flap such as prime editors that do not usually create a double-stranded break. This function was first demonstrated in a thesis by Lung in 2021, and replicated by Koeppel et al. in 2023. Subsequently, TREX2 has become incorporated into fusion enzymes for genetic engineering by multiple research groups for the purposes of reducing off-target edits which include chromosomal translocations and mismatched insertions.

== Clinical significance ==
Mutations in this gene may lead to Aicardi-Goutieres syndrome.
