= Coilodes =

Scientific classification
- Kingdom: Animalia
- Phylum: Arthropoda
- Clade: Pancrustacea
- Class: Insecta
- Order: Coleoptera
- Suborder: Polyphaga
- Infraorder: Scarabaeiformia
- Family: Hybosoridae
- Subfamily: Hybosorinae
- Genus: Coilodes; Westwood, 1846

Synonyms
- Gnombolbus Prokofiev, 2013

Genus of beetles

Coilodes is a Neotropical genus of the scavenger scarab beetle family Hybosoridae.

== Species ==
- Coilodes bezerrai Basílio & Vaz-de-Mello, 2023
- Coilodes castaneus Westwood, 1846
- Coilodes edeiltae Basílio & Vaz-de-Mello, 2023
- Coilodes fumipennis Arrow, 1909
- Coilodes humeralis (Mannerheim, 1929)
- Coilodes lunae Basílio & Vaz-de-Mello, 2023
- Coilodes mayae Basílio & Vaz-de-Mello, 2023
- Coilodes niger (Mannerheim, 1929)
- Coilodes ovalis Robinson, 1948
- Coilodes parvulus Westwood, 1846
- Coilodes punctipennis Arrow, 1909
- Coilodes ravii Basílio & Vaz-de-Mello, 2023
- Coilodes skelleyi Basílio & Vaz-de-Mello, 2023
