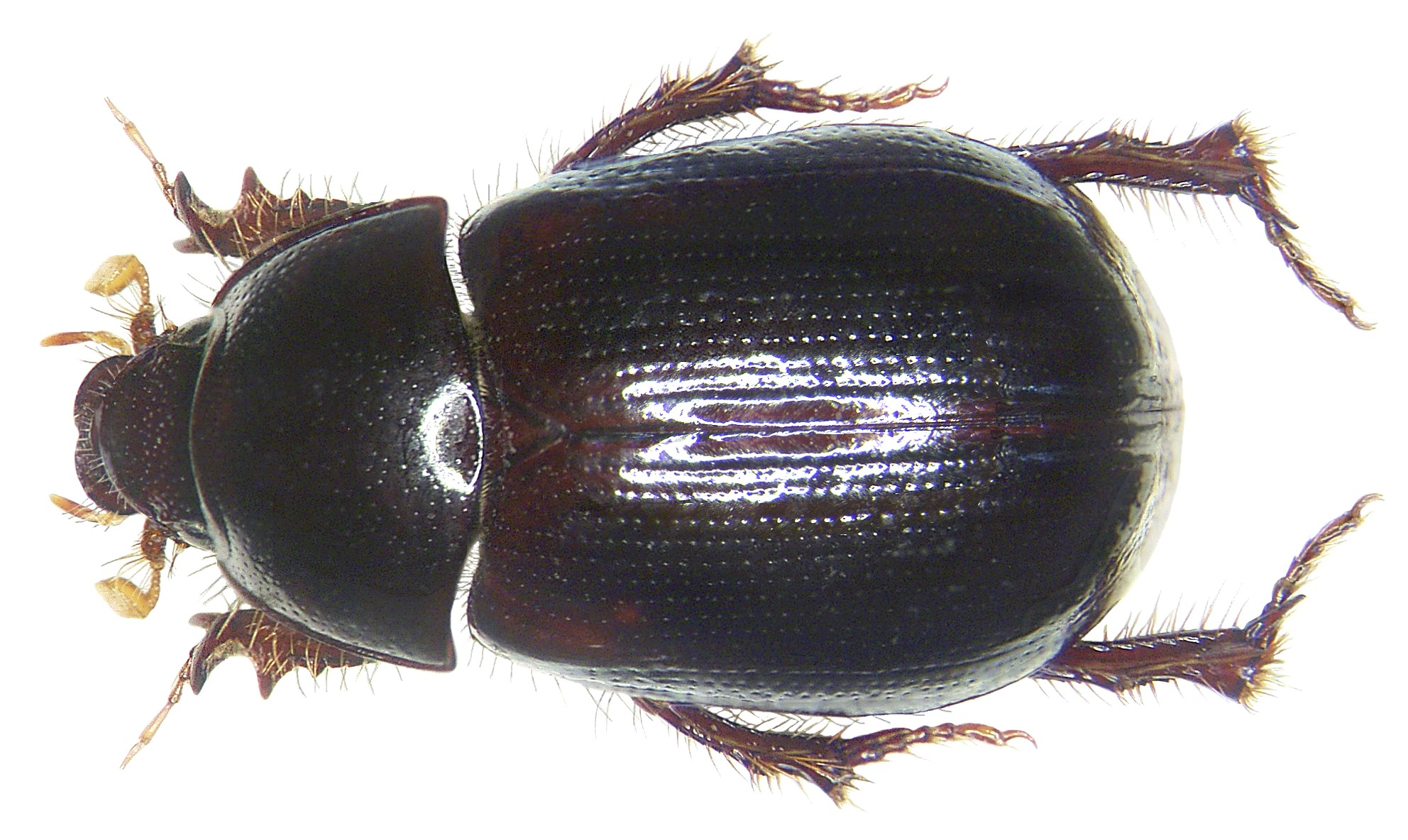
- Hybosorus roei

Scientific classification
- Kingdom: Animalia
- Phylum: Arthropoda
- Class: Insecta
- Order: Coleoptera
- Suborder: Polyphaga
- Infraorder: Scarabaeiformia
- Family: Hybosoridae
- Subfamily: Hybosorinae; Erichson, 1847

= Hybosorinae =

Subfamily of beetles

Hybosorinae is a subfamily of scavenger scarab beetles in the family Hybosoridae. There is at least one extant genus, Hybosorus, in Hybosorinae, and several extinct genera.

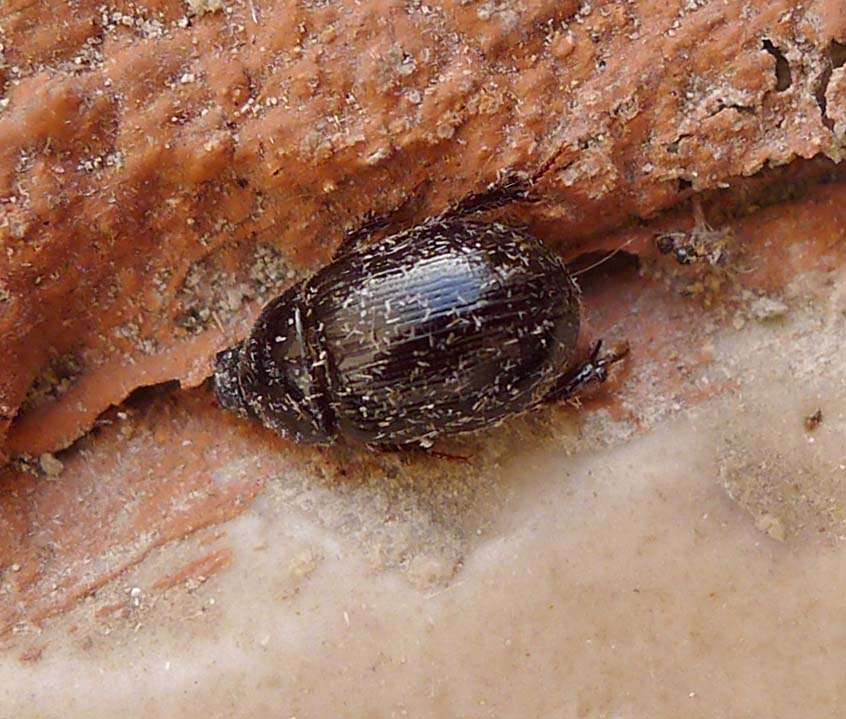
Hybosorus roei
