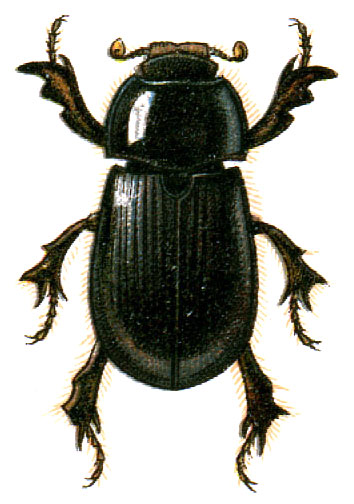
- Hybosorus roei

Scientific classification
- Kingdom: Animalia
- Phylum: Arthropoda
- Clade: Pancrustacea
- Class: Insecta
- Order: Coleoptera
- Suborder: Polyphaga
- Infraorder: Scarabaeiformia
- Superfamily: Scarabaeoidea
- Family: Hybosoridae; Erichson, 1847

Subfamilies
- Anaidinae; Ceratocanthinae; Hybosorinae; Liparochrinae; Pachyplectrinae

= Hybosoridae =

Hybosoridae Temporal range: Middle Jurassic–Recent

Family of beetles

Hybosoridae, sometimes known as the scavenger scarab beetles, is a family of scarabaeiform beetles. The >600 species in 78 extant genera occur widely in the tropics, but little is known of their biology.

Hybosorids are small, 5–7 mm in length and oval in shape. Color ranges from a glossy light brown to black. They are distinctive for their large mandibles and labrum, and their 10-segmented antennae, in which the 8th antennomere of the club is deeply grooved and occupied by the 9th and 10th antennomeres. The legs have prominent spurs.

The larvae have the C-shape and creamy white appearance typical of the scarabaeiforms. The 4-segmented legs are well-developed; the front legs are used to stridulate by rubbing against the margin of the epipharynx, a habit unique to this family.

Adults are known to feed on invertebrate and vertebrate carrion, with some found in dung. Larvae have been found in decomposing plant material. Little more is known of their life histories.

The group has been long recognized as distinct, primarily because of the larval characteristics, either as a distinct family or as a subfamily of Scarabaeidae, though its constituency was greatly expanded with the inclusion within it of the former family Ceratocanthidae.

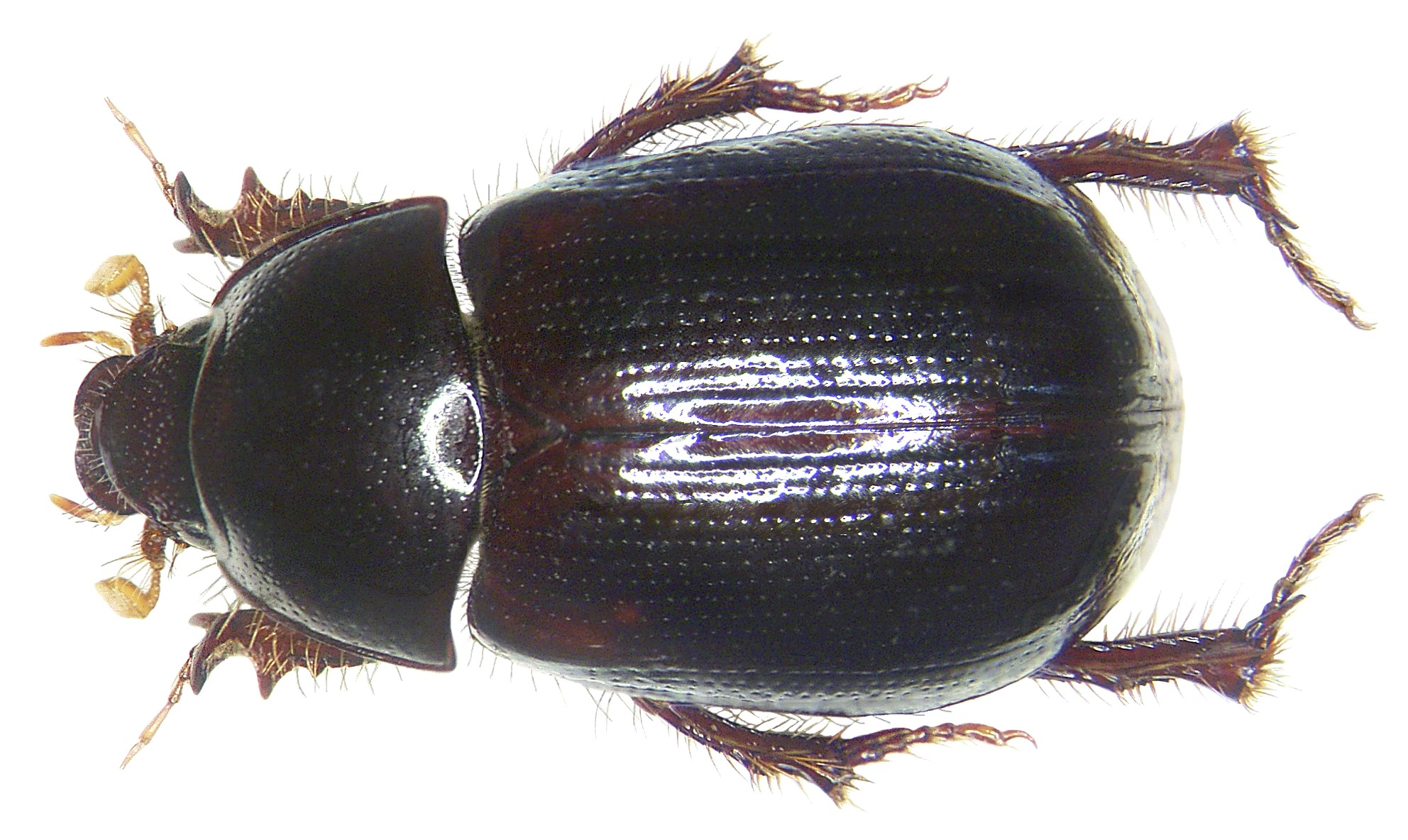
Hybosorus roei

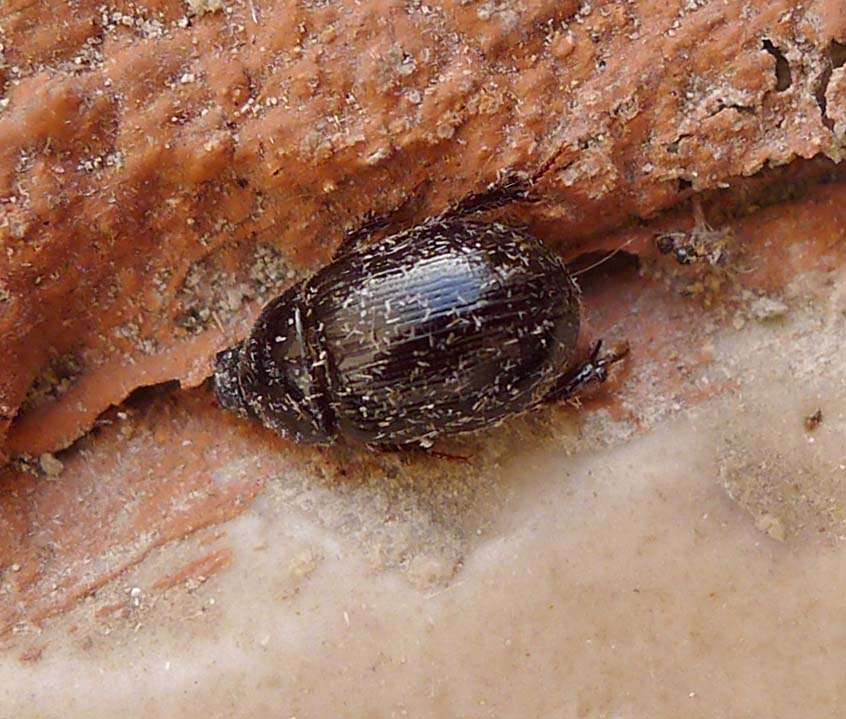
Hybosorus roei

== Genera ==
- Acanthocerodes^{c g}
- Adraria^{c g}
- Afrocloetus^{c g}
- Allidiostoma^{c g}
- Anaides^{c g}
- Aneilobolus^{c g}
- Anopsiostes^{c g}
- Antiochrus^{c g}
- Apalonychus^{c g}
- Aporolaus^{c g}
- Araeotanypus^{c g}
- Astaenomoechus^{c g}
- Aulisostes^{c g}
- Baloghianestes^{c g}
- Besuchetostes^{c g}
- Brenskea^{c g}
- Callophilharmostes^{c g}
- Callosides^{c g}
- Carinophilharmostes^{c g}
- Celaenochrous^{c g}
- Ceratocanthoides^{c g}
- Ceratocanthopsis^{c g}
- Ceratocanthus White, 1842^{i c g b}
- Chaetodus^{c g}
- Chaetophilharmostes^{c g}
- Cloeotus^{c g}
- Coilodes^{c g}
- Congomostes^{c g}
- Cryptogenius^{c g}
- Cryptophilharmostes^{c g}
- Cryptosphaeroides^{c g}
- Cyphopisthes^{c g}
- Daimothoracodes^{c g}
- Dicraeodon^{c g}
- Ebbrittoniella^{c g}
- Eusphaeropeltis^{c g}
- Germarostes Paulian, 1982^{i c g b}
- Glyptogermarostes^{c}
- Goudotostes^{c g}
- Hapalonychoides^{c g}
- Hybochaetodus^{c g}
- Hybosoroides^{c g}
- Hybosorus MacLeay, 1819^{i c g b}
- Hypseloderus^{c g}
- Ivieolus^{c g}
- Kuijtenous^{c g}
- Liparochrus^{c g}
- Macrophilharmostes^{c}
- Madrasostes^{c g}
- Martinezostes^{c g}
- Melanophilharmostes^{c g}
- Metachaetodus^{c g}
- Microphaeochroops^{c g}
- Microphaeolodes^{c g}
- Mimocoelodes^{c g}
- Nesopalla^{c g}
- Oxymorostes^{c g}
- Pachyplectrus LeConte, 1874^{i c g b}
- Pantolasius^{c g}
- Parallidiostoma^{c g}
- Paulianostes^{c g}
- Perignamptus^{c g}
- Petrovitzostes^{c g}
- Phaeochridius^{c g}
- Phaeochroops^{c g}
- Phaeochrous^{c g}
- Phaeocroides^{c g}
- Philharmostes^{c g}
- Procoilodes †
- Pseudopterorthochaetes^{c g}
- Pseudosynarmostes^{c g}
- Pterorthochaetes^{c g}
- Scarabaeinus^{c g}
- Scarabatermes^{c g}
- Seleucosorus^{c g}
- Synarmostes^{c g}
- Totoia^{c g}
- Trachycrusus^{c g}
- Tyrannasorus †
- Xenocanthus^{c g}

Data sources: i = ITIS, c = Catalogue of Life, g = GBIF, b = Bugguide.net

=== Extinct genera ===
- Subfamily Anaidinae Nikolajev 1996
  - †Crassisorus Nikolajev et al. 2012 Yixian Formation, China, Early Cretaceous (Aptian)
  - †Cretanaides Nikolajev 1996 Zaza Formation, Russia, Aptian
  - †Protanaides Nikolajev 2010 Zaza Formation, Russia, Aptian
- Subfamily Ceratocanthinae Martinez 1968
  - Tribe Ivieolini Howden and Gill 2000
    - †Mesoceratocanthus Nikolajev et al. 2010 Yixian Formation, China, Aptian
- Subfamily Hybosorinae Erichson 1847
  - †Cretohybosorus Nikolajev 1999 Zaza Formation, Russia, Aptian
  - †Fortishybosorus Yan et al. 2013 Yixian Formation, China, Aptian
  - †Jurahybosorus Nikolajev 2005 Bayan Teg, Mongolia, Middle Jurassic (Bajocian), Karabastau Formation, Kazakhstan, Late Jurassic
  - †Leptosorus Nikolajev 2006 Jiufotang Formation, China, Aptian, Zaza Formation, Russia, Aptian
  - †Protohybosorus Nikolajev 2010 Karabastau Formation, Kazakhstan, Late Jurassic
- Subfamily †Mimaphodiinae Nikolajev 2007
  - †Mimaphodius Nikolajev 2007 Zaza Formation, Russia, Aptian
- Subfamily Liparochrinae Ocampo 2006
  - †Libanochrus Kirejtshuk et al. 2011 Lebanese amber, Early Cretaceous (Barremian)
- †Coprologus Heer 1847 Upper Freshwater-Molasse Formation, Germany, Miocene
- †Procoilodes Ocampo 2002 Dominican amber, Miocene
- †Pulcherhybosorus Yan et al. 2012 Yixian Formation, China, Aptian
- †Sinochaetodus Lu et al. 2018 Yixian Formation, China, Aptian
- †Sinohybosorus Nie et al. 2018 Yixian Formation, China, Aptian
- †Tyrannasorus Ratcliffe and Ocampo 2001 Dominican amber, Miocene
