= List of Cyclocephala species =

This is a list of 356 species in the genus Cyclocephala, masked chafers.

== Cyclocephala species ==
- Cyclocephala abrelata Ratcliffe & Cave, 2002^{c g}
- Cyclocephala acoma Ratcliffe, 2008^{c g}
- Cyclocephala acuta Arrow, 1902^{c g}
- Cyclocephala aequatoria Endrödi, 1963^{c g}
- Cyclocephala affinis Endrödi, 1966^{c g}
- Cyclocephala alazonia Ratcliffe, 2003^{c g}
- Cyclocephala alexi Ratcliffe & Delgado, 1990^{c g}
- Cyclocephala almitana Dechambre, 1992^{c g}
- Cyclocephala altamontana Dechambre, 1999^{c g}
- Cyclocephala alutacea Höhne, 1923^{c g}
- Cyclocephala alvarengai Dechambre, 1980^{c g}
- Cyclocephala amazona (Linnaeus, 1767)^{c g}
- Cyclocephala amblyopsis Bates, 1888^{c g}
- Cyclocephala ampliata Bates, 1888^{c g}
- Cyclocephala amplitarsis Ratcliffe, 1992^{c g}
- Cyclocephala angularis (Knoch, 1801)^{c g}
- Cyclocephala anibali Joly, 2009^{c g}
- Cyclocephala aravaipensis Ratcliffe, 1992^{i c g}
- Cyclocephala arenosa Howden and Endrödi, 1966^{i c g}
- Cyclocephala arnaudi Dechambre, 1980^{c g}
- Cyclocephala arrowiana Martinez, 1967^{c g}
- Cyclocephala atricapilla Mannerheim, 1829^{c g}
- Cyclocephala atriceps (Casey, 1915)^{c g}
- Cyclocephala atricolor Chapin, 1932^{c g}
- Cyclocephala atripes Bates, 1888^{c g}
- Cyclocephala aulustjaorum Hielkema, 2017^{c g}
- Cyclocephala barrerai Martínez, 1969^{i c g}
- Cyclocephala batesi Delgado-Castillo & Castaneda, 1994^{c g}
- Cyclocephala bella Endrödi, 1969^{c g}
- Cyclocephala berti Delgado-Castillo, 1992^{c g}
- Cyclocephala bicolor Castelnau, 1840^{c g}
- Cyclocephala bicolorata Endrödi, 1964^{c g}
- Cyclocephala bimaculata Dechambre, 1999^{c g}
- Cyclocephala binotata Dechambre, 1999^{c g}
- Cyclocephala bleuzeni Dechambre, 1995^{c g}
- Cyclocephala boliviana Dechambre, 1997^{c g}
- Cyclocephala bollei Dechambre & Endrodi, 1984^{c g}
- Cyclocephala borburatae Endrödi, 1980^{c g}
- Cyclocephala borealis Arrow, 1911^{i c g b} (northern masked chafer)
- Cyclocephala boucheri Dechambre, 1997^{c g}
- Cyclocephala boulardi Dechambre, 1979^{c g}
- Cyclocephala brasiliana Endrödi, 1966^{c g}
- Cyclocephala brevipennis Endrödi, 1985^{c g}
- Cyclocephala brevis Höhne, 1923^{g}
- Cyclocephala brittoni Endrödi, 1964^{c g}
- Cyclocephala burmeisteri Endrödi, 1964^{c g}
- Cyclocephala caelestis Delgado and Ratcliffe, 1990^{i c g}
- Cyclocephala camachicola Ohaus, 1910^{c g}
- Cyclocephala capitata Höhne, 1923^{c g}
- Cyclocephala carbonaria Arrow, 1911^{c g}
- Cyclocephala cardini Chapin, 1935^{c g}
- Cyclocephala carinatipennis Martinez & Morón, 1984^{c g}
- Cyclocephala cartwighti Endrödi, 1964^{g}
- Cyclocephala cartwrighti Endrödi, 1964^{c g}
- Cyclocephala casanova Ratcliffe & Cave, 2009^{c g}
- Cyclocephala castanea (Olivier, 1789)^{c g}
- Cyclocephala castaniella Bates, 1888^{c g}
- Cyclocephala caussaneli Dechambre, 1999^{c g}
- Cyclocephala cearae Höhne, 1923^{c g}
- Cyclocephala celata Dechambre, 1980^{c g}
- Cyclocephala cerea Burmeister, 1847^{c g}
- Cyclocephala chalumeaui Martinez, 1978^{c g}
- Cyclocephala chera Ratcliffe, 2008^{c g}
- Cyclocephala chiquita Ratcliffe, 2008^{c g}
- Cyclocephala colasi Endrödi, 1964^{c g}
- Cyclocephala collaris Burmeister, 1847^{c g}
- Cyclocephala comata Bates, 1888^{i c g}
- Cyclocephala compacta Ratcliffe, 2008^{c g}
- Cyclocephala complanata Burmeister, 1847^{c g}
- Cyclocephala concolor Burmeister, 1847^{c g}
- Cyclocephala confusa Endrödi, 1966^{c g}
- Cyclocephala conspicua Sharp, 1877^{c g}
- Cyclocephala contraria Kirsch, 1873^{c g}
- Cyclocephala coriacea Dechambre, 1992^{c g}
- Cyclocephala couturieri Dechambre, 1999^{c g}
- Cyclocephala crassa Endrödi, 1967^{c g}
- Cyclocephala crepuscularis Martinez, 1954^{c g}
- Cyclocephala cribrata Burmeister, 1847^{c g}
- Cyclocephala curta Bates, 1888^{c g}
- Cyclocephala dalensi Ponchel, 2009^{c g}
- Cyclocephala deceptor (Casey, 1915)^{i c g}
- Cyclocephala decorella Endrödi, 1966^{c g}
- Cyclocephala defecta Endrödi, 1970^{c g}
- Cyclocephala deltoides Ratcliffe, 1992^{c g}
- Cyclocephala dichroa Dechambre, 1992^{c g}
- Cyclocephala dilatata (Prell, 1934)^{c g}
- Cyclocephala diluta Erichson, 1847^{c g}
- Cyclocephala discicollis Arrow, 1902^{c g}
- Cyclocephala discolor (Herbst, 1790)^{c g}
- Cyclocephala dispar (Herbst, 1790)^{c g}
- Cyclocephala distincta Burmeister, 1847^{c g}
- Cyclocephala divaricata Joly, 2005^{c g}
- Cyclocephala dolichotarsa Ratcliffe & Cave, 2008^{c g}
- Cyclocephala dominicana Endrödi, 1985^{c g}
- Cyclocephala duodecimpunctata Endrödi, 1966^{c g}
- Cyclocephala dupuisi Ratcliffe, 2014^{c g}
- Cyclocephala durantonorum Dechambre, 1999^{c g}
- Cyclocephala dyscinetoides Dechambre, 1999^{c g}
- Cyclocephala emarginata Endrödi, 1966^{c g}
- Cyclocephala endroedii Martinez, 1965^{c g}
- Cyclocephala endroedy-youngai Endrödi, 1964^{c g}
- Cyclocephala englemani (Ratcliffe, 1977)^{c g}
- Cyclocephala enigma Ratcliffe, 2003^{c g}
- Cyclocephala epistomalis Bates, 1888^{c g}
- Cyclocephala ergastuli Dechambre, 1997^{c g}
- Cyclocephala erotylina Arrow, 1914^{c g}
- Cyclocephala everardoi Grossi, Santos & Almeida, 2016^{c g}
- Cyclocephala falsa (Arrow, 1911)^{c g}
- Cyclocephala fankhaeneli Endrödi, 1964^{c g}
- Cyclocephala fasciolata Bates, 1888^{c g}
- Cyclocephala ferruginea (Fabricius, 1801)^{c g}
- Cyclocephala figueroai Paz-Ordoñez & Grossi, 2026
- Cyclocephala figurata Burmeister, 1847^{c g}
- Cyclocephala flavipennis Arrow, 1914^{c g}
- Cyclocephala flavoscutellaris Höhne, 1923^{c g}
- Cyclocephala flora Arrow, 1911^{c g}
- Cyclocephala forcipulata Howden and Endrödi, 1966^{i c g}
- Cyclocephala forsteri Endrödi, 1963^{c g}
- Cyclocephala freudei Endrödi, 1963^{i c g}
- Cyclocephala freyi Endrödi, 1964^{c g}
- Cyclocephala frontalis Chevrolat, 1844^{c g}
- Cyclocephala fulgurata Burmeister, 1847^{c g}
- Cyclocephala fulvipennis Burmeister, 1847^{c g}
- Cyclocephala gabaldoni Martinez & Martinez, 1981^{c g}
- Cyclocephala genieri Joly, 2010^{c g}
- Cyclocephala gigantea Dupuis, 1999^{c g}
- Cyclocephala goetzi Endrödi, 1966^{c g}
- Cyclocephala gravis Bates, 1888^{c g}
- Cyclocephala gregaria Heyne & Taschenberg, 1908^{c g}
- Cyclocephala guaguarum Dechambre & Endrodi, 1984^{c g}
- Cyclocephala guianae Endrödi, 1969^{c g}
- Cyclocephala guttata Bates, 1888^{c g}
- Cyclocephala guycolasi Dechambre, 1992^{c g}
- Cyclocephala halffteriana Martinez, 1968^{c g}
- Cyclocephala hardyi Endrödi, 1975^{c g}
- Cyclocephala hartmannorum Maly, 2006^{c g}
- Cyclocephala helavai Endrödi, 1975^{c g}
- Cyclocephala herteli Endrödi, 1964^{c g}
- Cyclocephala hiekei Endrödi, 1964^{c g}
- Cyclocephala hirsuta Höhne, 1923^{c g}
- Cyclocephala hirta Leconte, 1861^{i c g b}
- Cyclocephala histrionica Burmeister, 1847^{c g}
- Cyclocephala holmbergi Martinez, 1968^{c g}
- Cyclocephala howdenannae Endrödi, 1975^{c g}
- Cyclocephala husingi Endrödi, 1964^{c g}
- Cyclocephala iani Ratcliffe, 1992^{c g}
- Cyclocephala immaculata (Olivier, 1789)^{c g}
- Cyclocephala inca Endrödi, 1966^{c g}
- Cyclocephala insulicola Arrow, 1937^{c g}
- Cyclocephala isabellina Höhne, 1923^{c g}
- Cyclocephala isthmiensis Ratcliffe, 1992^{c g}
- Cyclocephala italoi Dupuis, 1999^{c g}
- Cyclocephala jalapensis Casey, 1915^{c g}
- Cyclocephala jauffreti Dechambre, 1979^{c g}
- Cyclocephala kahanoffae Martinez, 1975^{c g}
- Cyclocephala kaszabi Endrödi, 1964^{c g}
- Cyclocephala kechua (Martinez, 1957)^{c g}
- Cyclocephala knobelae (Brown, 1934)^{i c g}
- Cyclocephala krombeini Endrödi, 1979^{c g}
- Cyclocephala kuijteni Hielkema, 2023
- Cyclocephala kuntzeniana Höhne, 1923^{c g}
- Cyclocephala labidion Ratcliffe, 2003^{c g}
- Cyclocephala lachaumei Dechambre, 1992^{c g}
- Cyclocephala laevis Arrow, 1937^{c g}
- Cyclocephala lamarcki Dechambre, 1999^{c g}
- Cyclocephala laminata Burmeister, 1847^{c g}
- Cyclocephala larssoni Endrödi, 1964^{c g}
- Cyclocephala latericia Höhne, 1923^{c g}
- Cyclocephala latipennis Arrow, 1911^{c g}
- Cyclocephala latreillei Dechambre, 1999^{c g}
- Cyclocephala lecourti Dechambre, 1992^{c g}
- Cyclocephala letiranti Young, 1992^{c g}
- Cyclocephala lichyi Dechambre, 1980^{c g}
- Cyclocephala ligyrina Bates, 1888^{c g}
- Cyclocephala lineata Dupuis, 2008^{c g}
- Cyclocephala lineigera Höhne, 1923^{c g}
- Cyclocephala liomorpha Arrow, 1911^{c g}
- Cyclocephala literata Burmeister, 1847^{c g}
- Cyclocephala lizeri Martinez, 1964^{c g}
- Cyclocephala longa Endrödi, 1963^{c g}
- Cyclocephala longicollis Burmeister, 1847^{c g}
- Cyclocephala longimana Dechambre, 1980^{c g}
- Cyclocephala longitarsis Dechambre, 1999^{c g}
- Cyclocephala longula Leconte, 1863^{i c g b}
- Cyclocephala lunulata Burmeister, 1847^{i c g b}
- Cyclocephala lurida Bland, 1863^{i c g b} (southern masked chafer)
- Cyclocephala lutea Endrödi, 1966^{c g}
- Cyclocephala machadoi Grossi, Santos & Almeida, 2016^{c g}
- Cyclocephala macrophylla Erichson, 1847^{c g}
- Cyclocephala maculata Burmeister, 1847^{c g}
- Cyclocephala maculiventris Höhne, 1923^{c g}
- Cyclocephala mafaffa Burmeister, 1847^{i c g}
- Cyclocephala magdalenae Young & Le Tirant, 2005^{c g}
- Cyclocephala malleri Martinez, 1968^{c g}
- Cyclocephala malyi Dupuis, 2014^{c g}
- Cyclocephala mannheimsi Endrödi, 1964^{c g}
- Cyclocephala marginalis Kirsch, 1871^{c g}
- Cyclocephala marginicollis Arrow, 1902^{c g}
- Cyclocephala marianista Dechambre & Endrodi, 1984^{c g}
- Cyclocephala marqueti Dechambre, 1997^{c g}
- Cyclocephala martinezi Endrödi, 1964^{c g}
- Cyclocephala marylizae Ratcliffe, 2003^{c g}
- Cyclocephala mathani Dechambre, 1982^{c g}
- Cyclocephala mechae Martinez, 1978^{c g}
- Cyclocephala mecynotarsis Höhne, 1923^{c g}
- Cyclocephala megalophylla Endrödi, 1966^{c g}
- Cyclocephala meinanderi Endrödi, 1964^{c g}
- Cyclocephala melanae Bates, 1888^{c g}
- Cyclocephala melanocephala (Fabricius, 1775)^{i c g b}
- Cyclocephala melanopoda Ratcliffe, 2008^{c g}
- Cyclocephala melolonthida Ratcliffe & Cave, 2002^{c g}
- Cyclocephala mesophylla Mora-Aguilar & Delgado, 2012^{c g}
- Cyclocephala metrica Steinheil, 1872^{c g}
- Cyclocephala miamiensis Howden and Endrödi, 1966^{i c g}
- Cyclocephala minuchae Joly, 2003^{c g}
- Cyclocephala minuta Burmeister, 1847^{c g}
- Cyclocephala modesta Burmeister, 1847^{c g}
- Cyclocephala molesta Endrödi, 1969^{c g}
- Cyclocephala monacha Ratcliffe, 2008^{c g}
- Cyclocephala monnei Paz-Ordoñez & Grossi, 2026
- Cyclocephala monzoni Ratcliffe & Cave, 2009^{c g}
- Cyclocephala moreti Dechambre, 1992^{c g}
- Cyclocephala morphoidina Prell, 1937^{c g}
- Cyclocephala multiplex Casey, 1915^{c g}
- Cyclocephala munda Kirsch, 1870^{c g}
- Cyclocephala mustacha Ratcliffe, 2003^{c g}
- Cyclocephala mutata Harold, 1869^{c g}
- Cyclocephala nana Dechambre, 1999^{c g}
- Cyclocephala nigerrima Bates, 1888^{c g}
- Cyclocephala nigra Dechambre, 1999^{c}
- Cyclocephala nigricollis Burmeister, 1847^{i}
- Cyclocephala nigritarsis Ratcliffe, 1992^{c g}
- Cyclocephala nigrobasalis Höhne, 1923^{c g}
- Cyclocephala nigropicta Dechambre & Endrodi, 1983^{c g}
- Cyclocephala niguasa Dechambre & Endrodi, 1984^{c g}
- Cyclocephala nike Ratcliffe, 1992^{c g}
- Cyclocephala nodanotherwon Ratcliffe, 1992^{c g}
- Cyclocephala notata (Illiger, 1806)^{c g}
- Cyclocephala obscura Endrödi, 1966^{c g}
- Cyclocephala occipitalis Fairmaire, 1892^{c g}
- Cyclocephala ocellata Burmeister, 1847^{c g}
- Cyclocephala ochracea Prell, 1937^{c g}
- Cyclocephala octopunctata Burmeister, 1847^{c g}
- Cyclocephala ohausiana Höhne, 1923^{c g}
- Cyclocephala olivieri Arrow, 1911^{c g}
- Cyclocephala ovulum Bates, 1888^{c g}
- Cyclocephala pan Ratcliffe, 1992^{c g}
- Cyclocephala panthera Dechambre, 1979^{c g}
- Cyclocephala paraflora Martinez, 1978^{c g}
- Cyclocephala paraguayensis Arrow, 1903^{c g}
- Cyclocephala parallela (Casey, 1915)^{i c b}
- Cyclocephala pardolocarnoi Dechambre, 1995^{c g}
- Cyclocephala pasadenae (Casey, 1915)^{i c g b}
- Cyclocephala perconfusa Dechambre, 1992^{c g}
- Cyclocephala pereirai (Martinez, 1960)^{c g}
- Cyclocephala perforata Arrow, 1913^{c g}
- Cyclocephala perplexa Ratcliffe, 2008^{c g}
- Cyclocephala peruana Endrödi, 1966^{c g}
- Cyclocephala pichinchana Dechambre, 1992^{c g}
- Cyclocephala picipes (Olivier, 1789)^{c g}
- Cyclocephala picta Burmeister, 1847^{c g}
- Cyclocephala pilosa Dupuis, 2006^{c g}
- Cyclocephala pilosicollis Saylor, 1936^{i c g}
- Cyclocephala pokornyi Dupuis, 2014^{c g}
- Cyclocephala pompanoni Dechambre, 1979^{c g}
- Cyclocephala poncheli Dechambre & Duranton, 2005^{c g}
- Cyclocephala porioni Dechambre, 1979^{c g}
- Cyclocephala prelli Endrödi, 1967^{c g}
- Cyclocephala prolongata Arrow, 1902^{c g}
- Cyclocephala proxima Dechambre, 1997^{c g}
- Cyclocephala pseudoconfusa Ratcliffe, 1992^{c g}
- Cyclocephala pseudomelanocephala Dupuis, 1996^{c g}
- Cyclocephala puberula LeConte, 1863^{i c g}
- Cyclocephala pugnax Arrow, 1914^{c g}
- Cyclocephala pulchra Dechambre, 1999^{c g}
- Cyclocephala puncticollis Endrödi, 1966^{c g}
- Cyclocephala putrida Burmeister, 1847^{c g}
- Cyclocephala pygidialis Joly, 2000^{c g}
- Cyclocephala pygidiata Dupuis, 1999^{c g}
- Cyclocephala quadripunctata Höhne, 1923^{c g}
- Cyclocephala quatuordecimpunctata Mannerheim, 1829^{c g}
- Cyclocephala quercina Burmeister, 1847^{c g}
- Cyclocephala quisqueya Joly, 1998^{c g}
- Cyclocephala rangelana Chapin, 1935^{c g}
- Cyclocephala ratcliffei Endrödi, 1977^{c g}
- Cyclocephala recta Dupuis, 2008^{c g}
- Cyclocephala regularis Casey, 1915^{i g}
- Cyclocephala robusta LECONTE, 1863^{c g b}
- Cyclocephala rogezi Dechambre, 1992^{c g}
- Cyclocephala rondoniana Ratcliffe, 1992^{c g}
- Cyclocephala rorulenta Höhne, 1923^{c g}
- Cyclocephala rotundipenis Dupuis, 2009^{c g}
- Cyclocephala rubescens Bates, 1891^{c g}
- Cyclocephala rufa Endrödi, 1967^{c g}
- Cyclocephala rufescens Endrödi, 1967^{c g}
- Cyclocephala ruficollis Burmeister, 1847^{c g}
- Cyclocephala rufonigra Demay, 1838^{c g}
- Cyclocephala rufovaria Arrow, 1911^{c g}
- Cyclocephala rustica (Olivier, 1789)^{c g}
- Cyclocephala saltini Ratcliffe, 2008^{c g}
- Cyclocephala sanguinicollis Burmeister, 1847^{i c g}
- Cyclocephala santaritae Ratcliffe, 1992^{c g}
- Cyclocephala sarahae Ratcliffe, 1992^{c g}
- Cyclocephala sardadebiae Dechambre & Duranton, 2005^{c g}
- Cyclocephala sarpedon Ratcliffe, 1992^{c g}
- Cyclocephala scarabaeina (Gyllenhal, 1817)^{c g}
- Cyclocephala schmitzorum Ratcliffe, 1992^{c g}
- Cyclocephala seditiosa LeConte, 1863^{i c g}
- Cyclocephala setosa Burmeister, 1847^{c g}
- Cyclocephala sexpunctata Castelnau, 1840^{c g}
- Cyclocephala signaticollis Burmeister, 1847^{c g}
- Cyclocephala signatoides Höhne, 1923^{c g}
- Cyclocephala similis Dechambre, 1980^{c g}
- Cyclocephala simillima Dechambre, 1999^{c g}
- Cyclocephala simulatrix Höhne, 1923^{c g}
- Cyclocephala sinaloae Howden and Endrödi, 1966^{i c g}
- Cyclocephala sinuosa Höhne, 1923^{c g}
- Cyclocephala sororia Bates, 1888^{i}
- Cyclocephala spangleri Joly, 2000^{c g}
- Cyclocephala sparsa Arrow, 1902^{i c g}
- Cyclocephala spilopyga Erichson, 1847^{c g}
- Cyclocephala stictica Burmeister, 1847^{c g}
- Cyclocephala stockwelli Ratcliffe, 2003^{c g}
- Cyclocephala striata Endrödi, 1963^{c g}
- Cyclocephala subsignata Burmeister, 1847^{c g}
- Cyclocephala supernana Dechambre, 1999^{c g}
- Cyclocephala suturalis Ohaus, 1911^{c g}
- Cyclocephala sylviae Dechambre, 1995^{c g}
- Cyclocephala testacea Burmeister, 1847^{i c g}
- Cyclocephala tetrica Burmeister, 1847^{c g}
- Cyclocephala tidula Dechambre, 1999^{c g}
- Cyclocephala toulgoeti Dechambre, 1992^{c g}
- Cyclocephala tridentata (Fabricius, 1801)^{c g}
- Cyclocephala tronchonii Martinez, 1975^{c g}
- Cyclocephala tucumana Brethes, 1904^{c g}
- Cyclocephala tutilina Burmeister, 1847^{c g}
- Cyclocephala tylifera Höhne, 1923^{c g}
- Cyclocephala unamas Ratcliffe, 2003^{c g}
- Cyclocephala undata (Olivier, 1789)^{c g}
- Cyclocephala unidentata Endrödi, 1980^{c g}
- Cyclocephala variabilis Burmeister, 1847^{i c g}
- Cyclocephala varians Burmeister, 1847^{c g}
- Cyclocephala variipenis Dechambre, 1999^{c g}
- Cyclocephala variolosa Burmeister, 1847^{c g}
- Cyclocephala verticalis Burmeister, 1847^{c g}
- Cyclocephala vestita Höhne, 1923^{c g}
- Cyclocephala vidanoi Dechambre, 1992^{c g}
- Cyclocephala villosa Blanchard, 1846^{c g}
- Cyclocephala vincentiae Arrow, 1900^{c g}
- Cyclocephala vinosa Arrow, 1937^{c g}
- Cyclocephala virgo Dechambre, 1999^{c g}
- Cyclocephala viridis Dechambre, 1982^{c g}
- Cyclocephala vittoscutellaris Prell, 1937^{c g}
- Cyclocephala wandae Hardy, 1974^{i c g}
- Cyclocephala weidneri Endrödi, 1964^{c g}
- Cyclocephala williami Ratcliffe, 1992^{c g}
- Cyclocephala zischkai Martinez, 1965^{c g}
- Cyclocephala zodion Ratcliffe, 1992^{c g}
- Cyclocephala zurstrasseni Endrödi, 1964^{c g}

Data sources: i = ITIS, c = Catalogue of Life, g = GBIF, b = Bugguide.net
