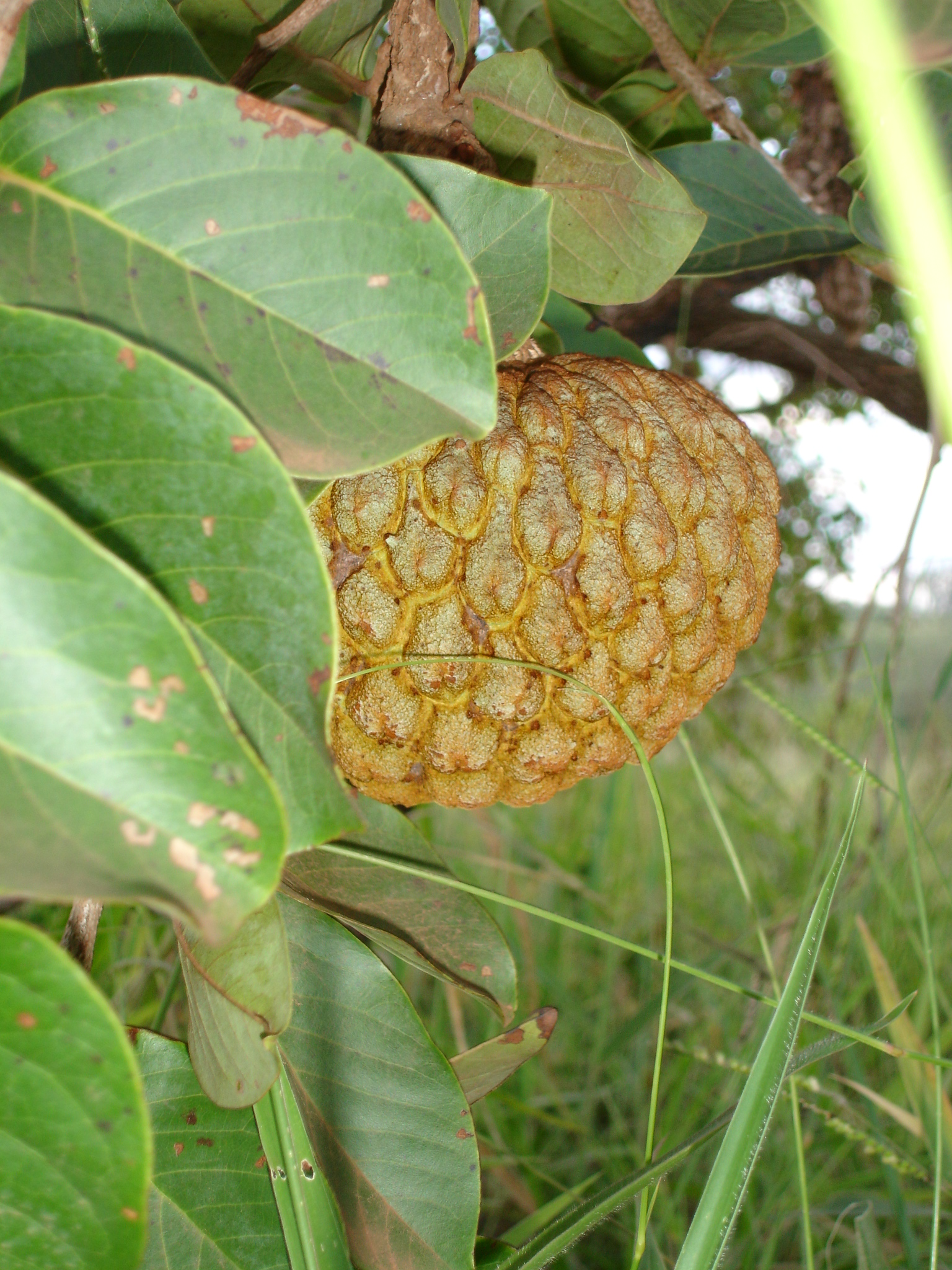

Conservation status
- Least Concern (IUCN 3.1)

Scientific classification
- Kingdom: Plantae
- Clade: Embryophytes
- Clade: Tracheophytes
- Clade: Spermatophytes
- Clade: Angiosperms
- Clade: Magnoliids
- Order: Magnoliales
- Family: Annonaceae
- Genus: Annona
- Species: A. crassiflora

Binomial name
- Annona crassiflora Mart.

= Annona crassiflora =

Species of fruit and plant

Annona crassiflora, commonly known as marolo, araticum cortiça, araticum do cerrado or bruto, is a flowering plant in the Annonaceae family. The flowers of a marolo look like jellyfish wearing hats, and the fruits are sweet and very rough. It is native to Brazil and Paraguay and the fruit is eaten by native peoples in the Brazilian Cerrado. Although it is considered to have potential for cultivation, it has not been domesticated to date.

== Description ==
Marolo is a tree of about 6–8 m tall, with a crown diameter reaching 2–4 m, from the Annonaceae family, which occurs discontinuously in the Brazilian cerrado. The plant prefers the savannah regions with lower moisture deficit such as Minas Gerais, where the fruit is typical and very much appreciated, Mato Grosso do Sul, a small portion of the interior of São Paulo and in isolated parts of Goiás, Mato Grosso, Tocantins, Maranhão and the eastern part of Bahia.

=== Roots, trunk and leaves ===
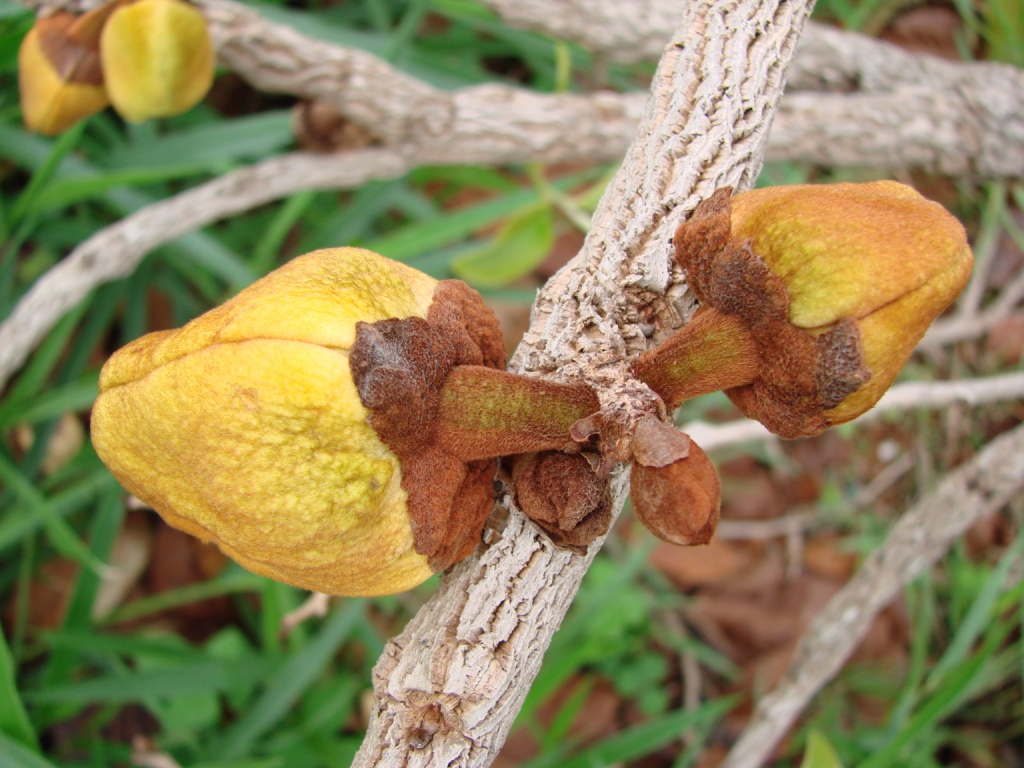
Flowering buds of Annona crassiflora, Brasília.

It has axial root system that reaches greater depths in the soil to absorb water and nutrients. Its trunk is straight with crooked twigs, its bark is corky, chipped and thick. It has ovate leaves, leathery, yellow-greenish flowers that occur between November and January, with entomophilous pollination, more specifically by the Ciclocéfalo beetle (Cyclocephala atricapilla). The fruits are multiple bacáceas infructescenses up to 4.5 kg, edible, green-brownish bark when mature, with seeds also regarded as anti-diarrheal.

=== Fruits ===
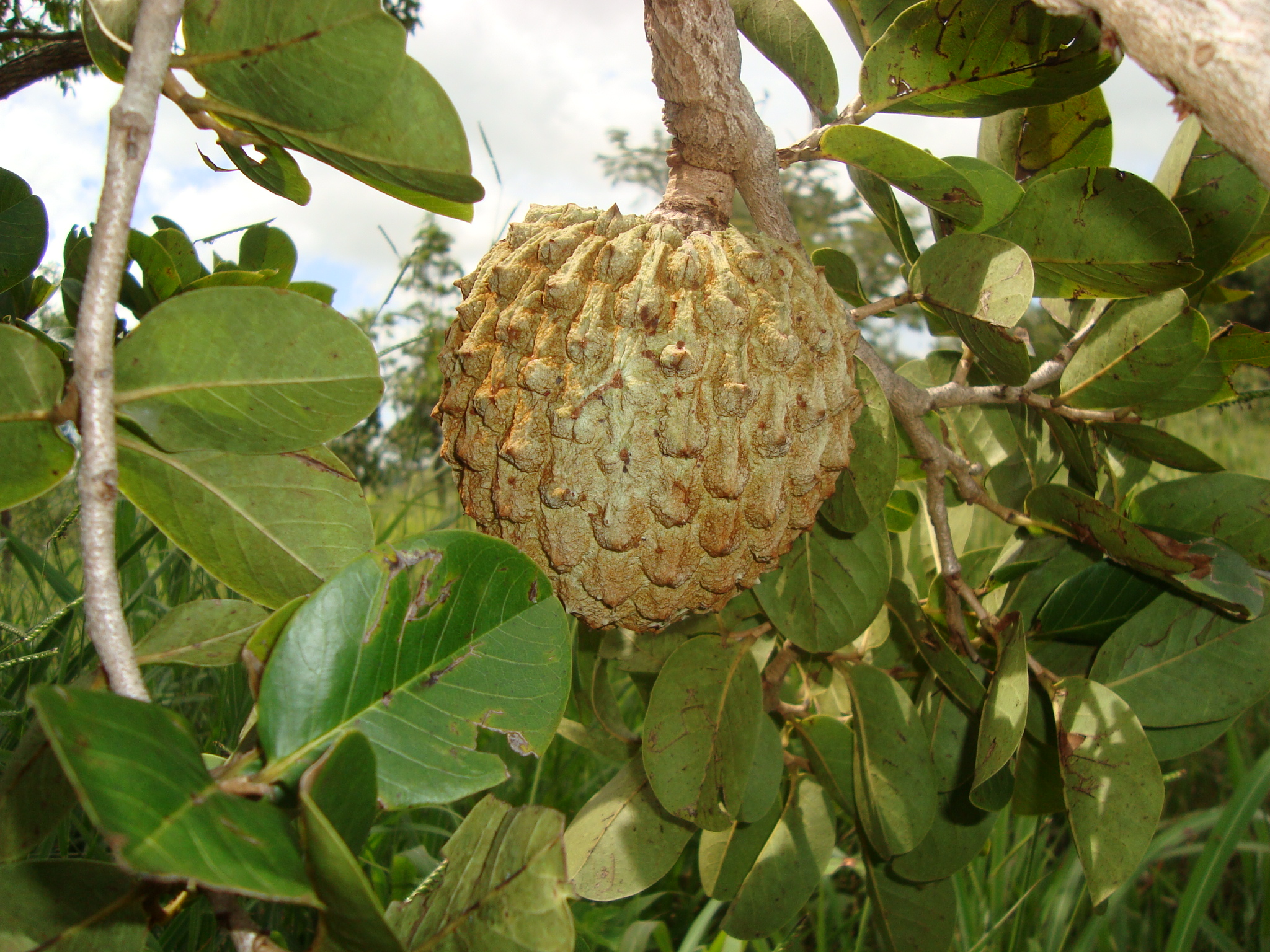
Araticum fruit.

Its fruits reach over 15 cm in diameter and 2 kg, containing many seeds about 1.5 cm long. When opened, the fruit has a creamy pulp and very strong odor and flavor that differs greatly from custard apple. It is considered a delicacy in the Brazilian Cerrado region, sold in street markets, consumed fresh or as a Cocktail, cake, in the form of cookies, crackers, pops, ice cream, jams and many other sweets.

The fruiting begins in November, maturing between February and April, where living in Minas Gerais Brazil, where it is popularly associated with the Lent season. When the fruit is ripe it falls to the ground under the protection of the crown, exuding a strong and distinctive smell. These are the best quality fruits for the consumer, because if harvested directly from the tree, the fruit will not mature, producing an inferior quality flavor.

=== Reproductive Biology ===
Its pollen is shed as permanent tetrads.

== Deforestation and reduction of species ==
The increasing deforestation of the Cerrado and the delayed germination of seeds, which can reach up to three hundred days, have contributed much to the radical reduction of maroleiros in Minas Gerais. It is the scientific research work and cultivation developed by João Afonso de Carvalho, professor at the Federal Agrotechnical School in Machado, in southern Minas Gerais, that preserves the Marolo trees region. The locations which concentrate a greater number of species of trees are Carvalhópolis and Paraguaçu.
