= Cyclocephala latericia =

Scientific classification
- Kingdom: Animalia
- Phylum: Arthropoda
- Clade: Pancrustacea
- Class: Insecta
- Order: Coleoptera
- Suborder: Polyphaga
- Infraorder: Scarabaeiformia
- Family: Scarabaeidae
- Genus: Cyclocephala
- Species: C. latericia

Binomial name
- Cyclocephala latericia Höhne, 1923

Species of insect

Cyclocephala latericia is a beetle which belongs to the subfamily Dynastinae in the family Scarabaeidae.

== Appearance ==
The beetle is a medium sized (ca. 15 millimeter), wide, glossy, tan and black rhinoceros beetle. The head is black, the legs are tan. The pronotum and scutellum have different shaped black spots. On the pronotum there are six spots: two round on the side and four more or less triangular that form a square in the middle. The wings tend to have two spots on the front and one on the back. The body does not have a horn on the head or pits on the pronotum, the sexes can be distinguished by the fact that the male is narrower than the female and that the feet, and especially the claw joint, on the forelegs are thickened, with this species the claws are extra large. The top is fine and scattered, with barely visible punctures.

== Life cycle ==
The larvae are known only to a few species of the genus, which live in the soil and eat on grass roots. The adult beetles often visit flowers to eat pollen, and can be important pollinators. This species has been found in the floral chambers of Annona crassiflora.

== Range ==
The species is known in Brazil, Bolivia, Paraguay and Argentina.
