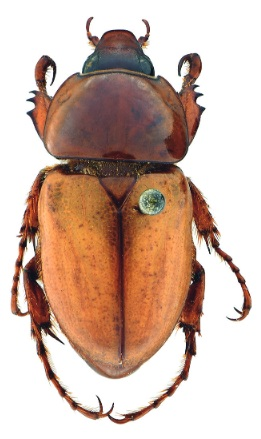

Scientific classification
- Kingdom: Animalia
- Phylum: Arthropoda
- Clade: Pancrustacea
- Class: Insecta
- Order: Coleoptera
- Suborder: Polyphaga
- Infraorder: Scarabaeiformia
- Family: Scarabaeidae
- Genus: Cyclocephala
- Species: C. monnei

Binomial name
- Cyclocephala monnei Paz-Ordoñez & Grossi, 2026

= Cyclocephala monnei =

Species of beetle

Cyclocephala monnei is a species of beetle of the family Scarabaeidae. It is found in Brazil (Mato Grosso do Sul).

== Description ==
Adults reach a length of about 17–18 mm (0.67–0.71 in). The dorsal surface is strongly shiny on the pronotum and elytral disc, while the elytral apex is slightly dull. The head, pronotum, scutellum, legs and ventral surface are reddish‑brown, while the elytra are yellowish and slightly darkened.

== Etymology ==
The species is dedicated to the entomologist Dr. Miguel Ángel Monné. The name honours his contributions to the research of the taxonomy of the Cerambycidae (Coleoptera), the curation of the collection of the National Museum (Brazil) and the training of many generations of entomologists.
