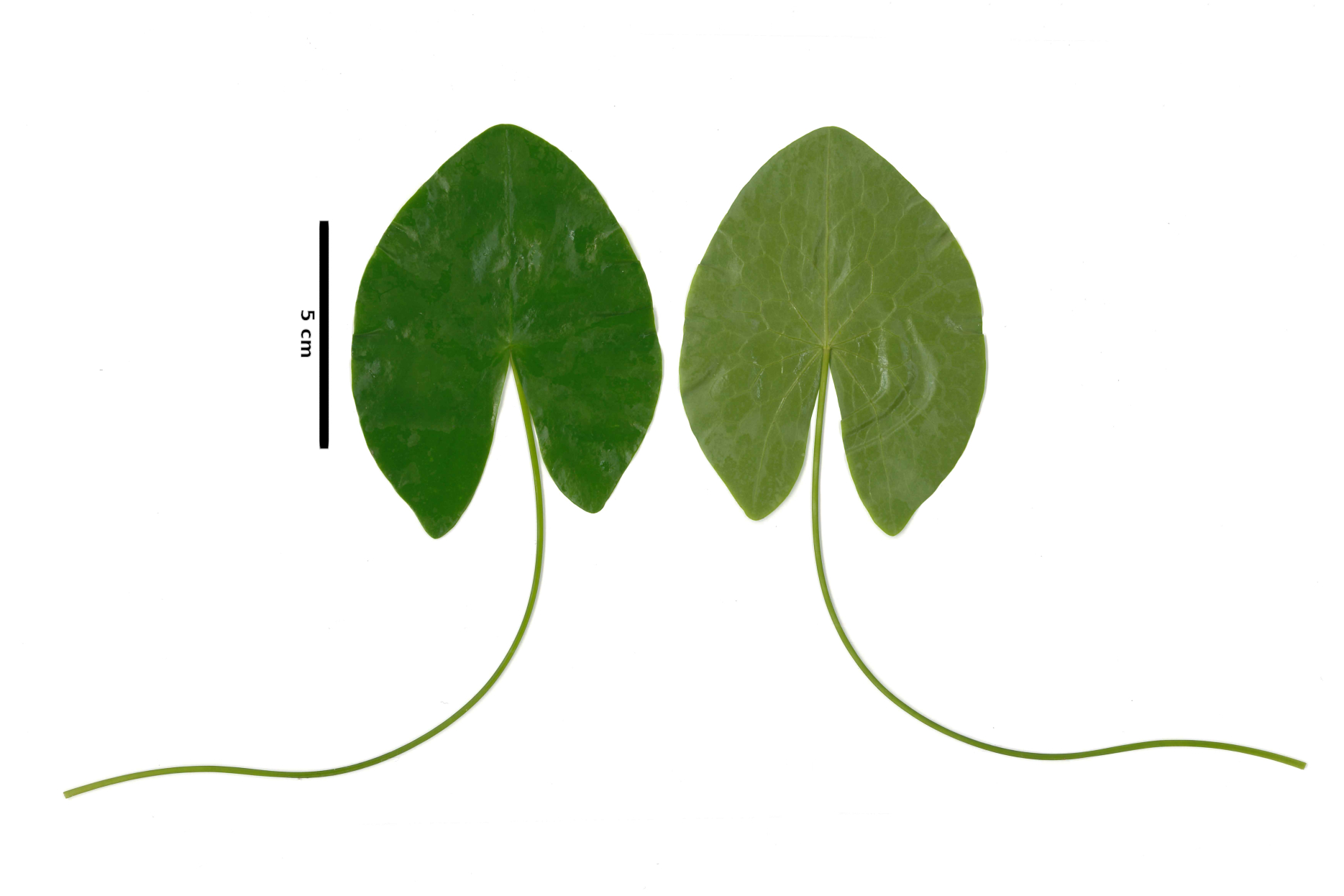
- Floating leaf of Nymphaea glandulifera with scale bar (5 cm) on a white background with adaxial leaf surface (left) and abaxial leaf surface (right)
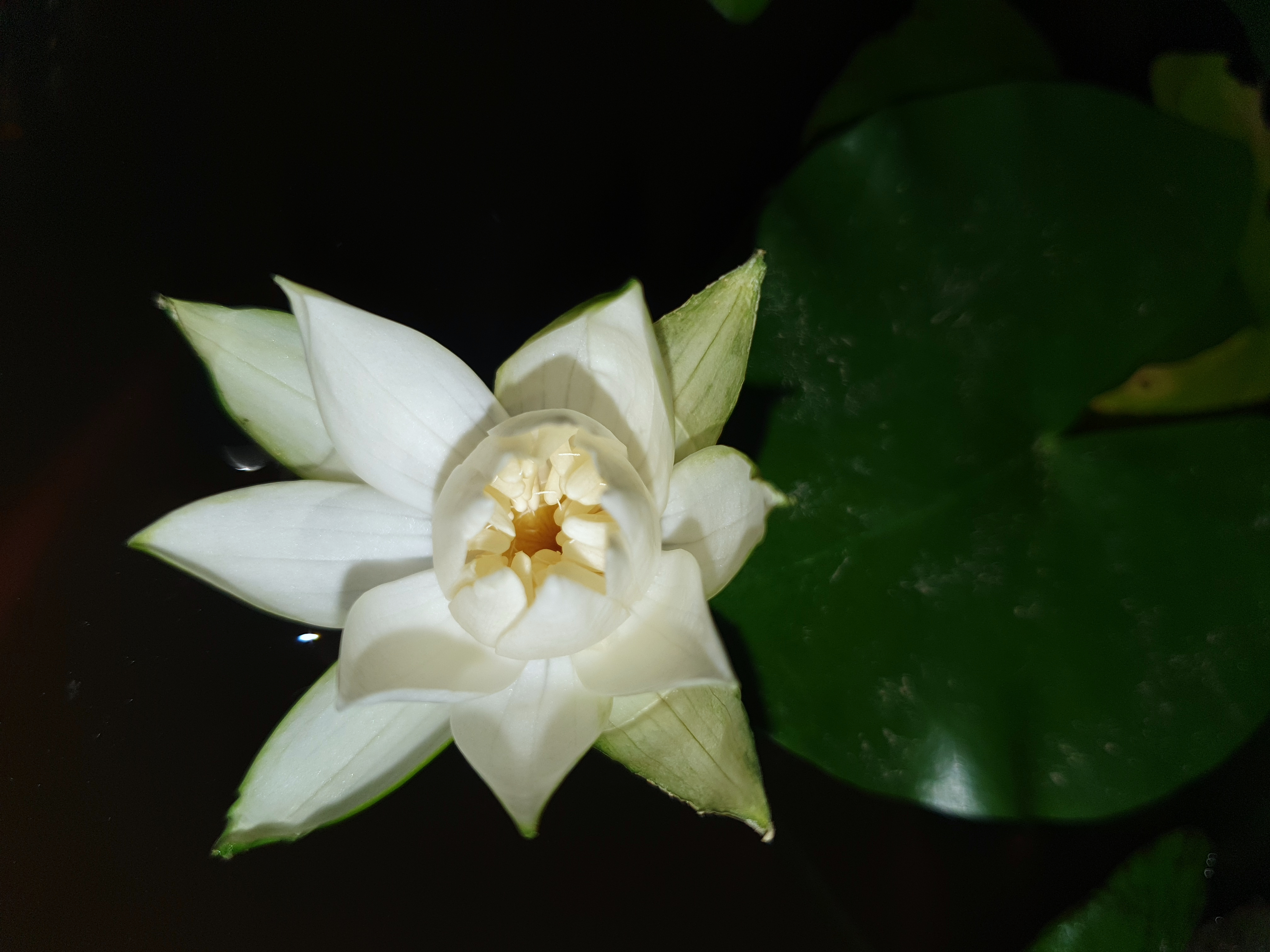
- Nymphaea glandulifera flower

Scientific classification
- Kingdom: Plantae
- Clade: Tracheophytes
- Clade: Angiosperms
- Order: Nymphaeales
- Family: Nymphaeaceae
- Genus: Nymphaea
- Subgenus: Nymphaea subg. Hydrocallis
- Species: N. glandulifera

Binomial name
- Nymphaea glandulifera Rodschied

Synonyms
- Castalia blanda G.Lawson; Leuconymphaea blanda Kuntze; Nymphaea blanda G.Mey.; Nymphaea blanda f. genuina Planch.; Nymphaea blanda var. fenzliana (Lehm.) Casp.; Nymphaea fenzliana Lehm.

= Nymphaea glandulifera =

Species of water lily

Nymphaea glandulifera is a species of waterlily native to tropical America.

== Description ==
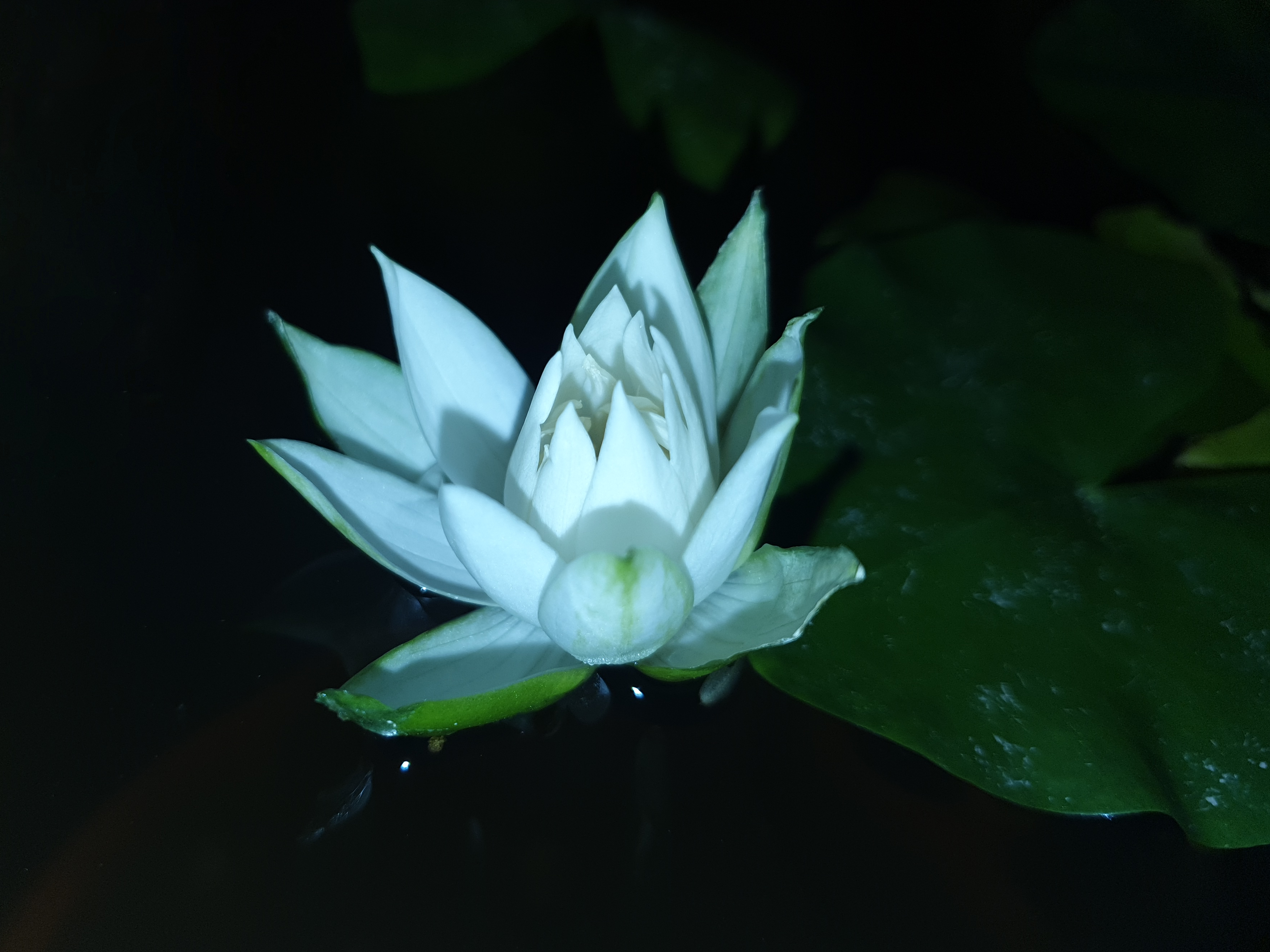
Nymphaea glandulifera Rodschied flower

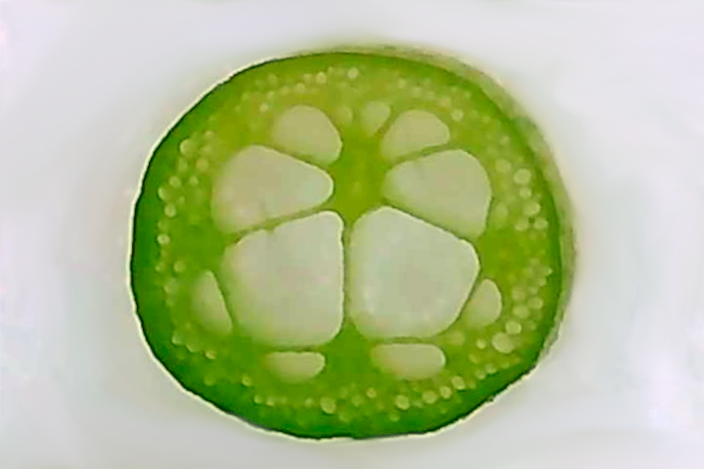
Cross section of Nymphaea glandulifera Rodschied petiole with numerous air canals on a grey background

=== Vegetative characteristics ===
Nymphaea glandulifera produces ovoid tubers, which do not produce stolons. The petiole has two sets of air channels: Four central channels and four peripheral smaller channels.

=== Generative characteristics ===
The flowers have a green peduncle, which has six bigger air channels and twelve smaller peripheral air channels. The flowers open at dusk and close by midnight. This species does not have proliferating pseudanthia.

== Reproduction ==
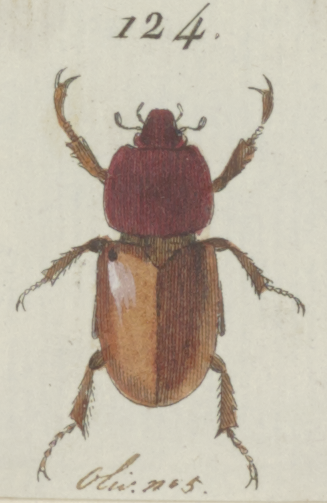
Cyclocephala castanea beetles have reportedly visited flowers of Nymphaea glandulifera

Only sexual reproduction is known to occur in this species. No stolons or proliferate pseudanthia are known to occur in Nymphaea glandulifera. Autogamy is thought to occur in this species. Additionally, there have been reports of Cyclocephala castanea beetles visiting Nymphaea glandulifera flowers in Surinam.

== Habitat ==
In Bolivia it has been reported to grow in seasonally inundated savannas, or in small pools associated with streams of water.

== Taxonomy ==
=== Type specimen ===
The type specimen was collected by Rodschied in Guyana.

=== Placement within Nymphaea ===
It is placed within Nymphaea subg. Hydrocallis.

== Etymology ==
The specific epithet glandulifera means "gland bearing".

== Cultivation ==
It is suitable for small aquariums.
