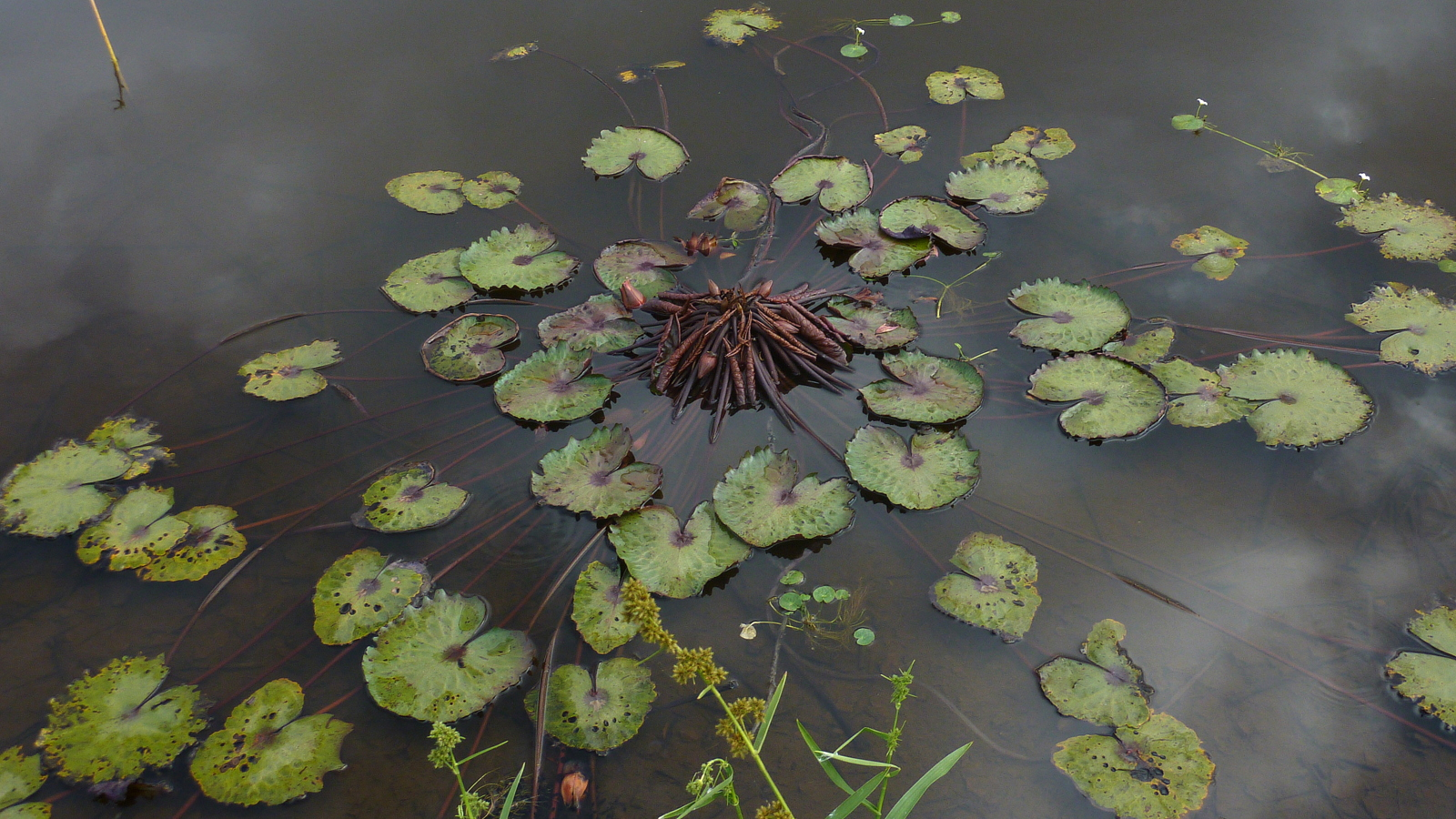
- Nymphaea rudgeana in its natural habitat in Bahia, Brazil
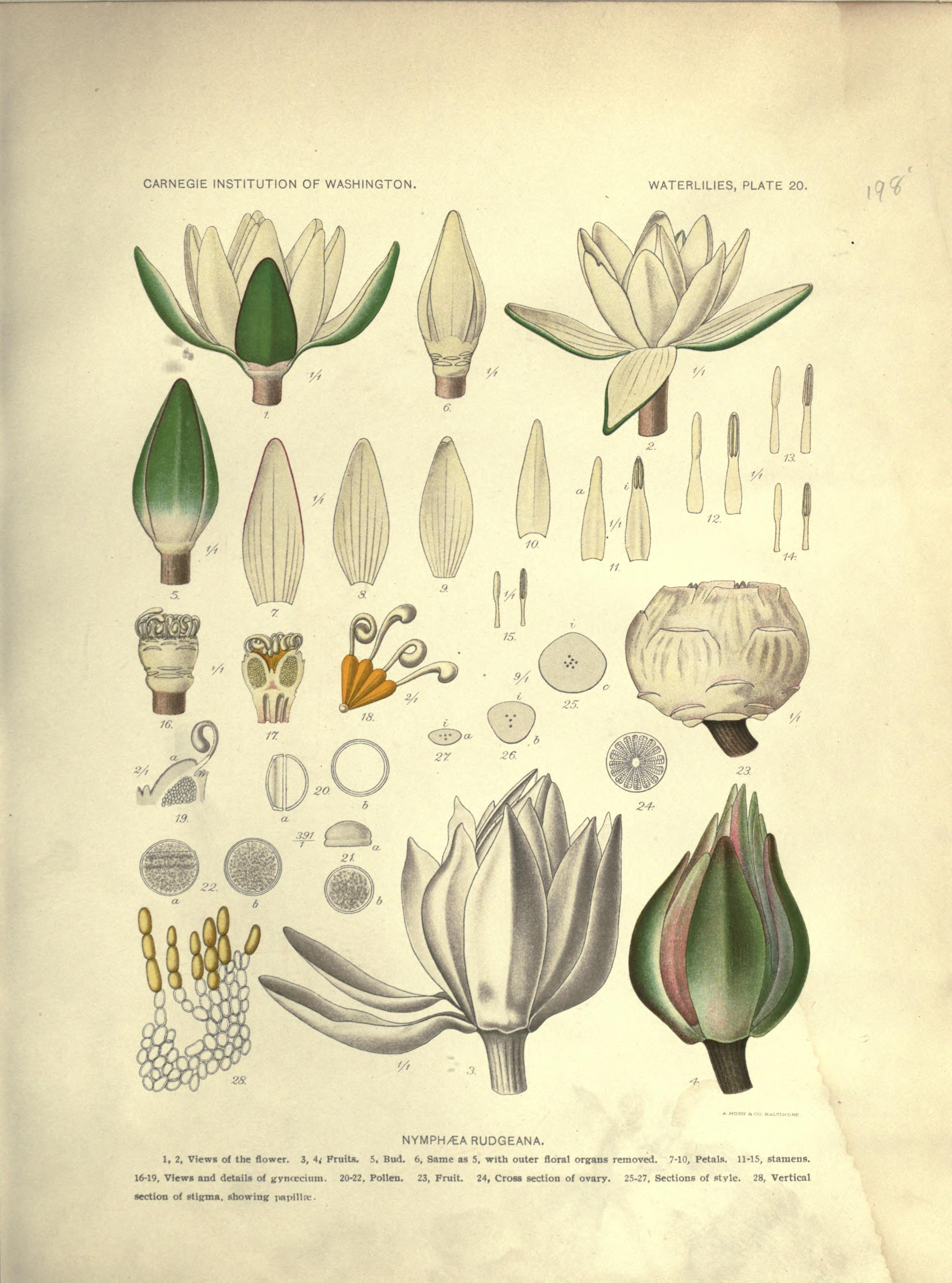
- Botanical illustration of Nymphaea rudgeana

Scientific classification
- Kingdom: Plantae
- Clade: Tracheophytes
- Clade: Angiosperms
- Order: Nymphaeales
- Family: Nymphaeaceae
- Genus: Nymphaea
- Subgenus: Nymphaea subg. Hydrocallis
- Species: N. rudgeana

Binomial name
- Nymphaea rudgeana G.Mey.

Synonyms
- Castalia rudgeana (G.Mey.) Britton & P.Wilson; Nymphaea ampla var. rudgeana (G.Mey.) DC.; Nymphaea blanda Planch.

= Nymphaea rudgeana =

Species of water lily

Nymphaea rudgeana is a species of waterlily native to the region spanning from Mexico to tropical South America.

== Description ==
=== Vegetative characteristics ===
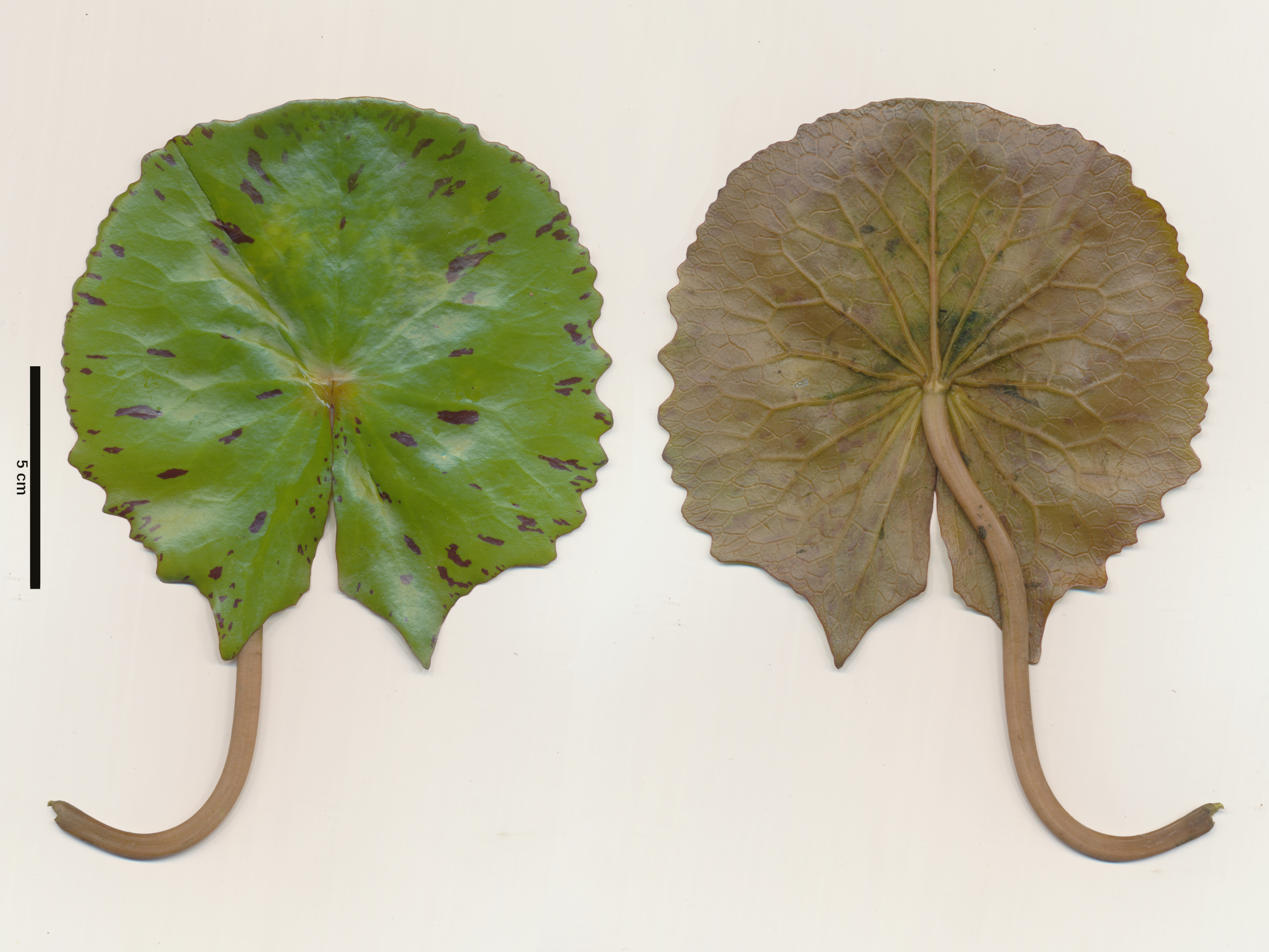
Nymphaea rudgeana G.Mey. floating leaf with scale bar (5 cm) on a white background

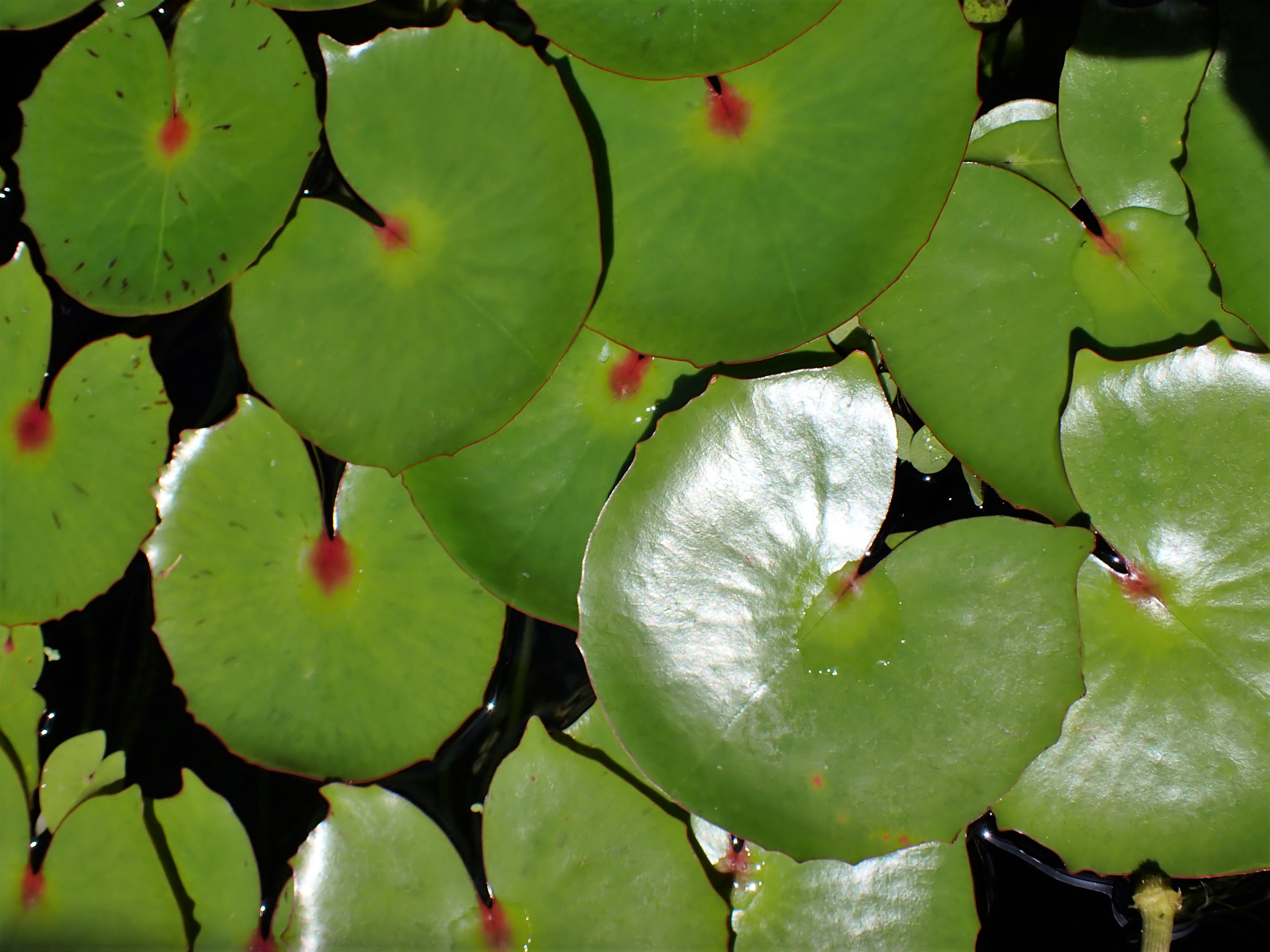
Nymphaea rudgeana G.Mey. foliage of plants cultivated at the Botanischer Garten Berlin-Dahlem

The ovoid to subglobose rhizome may exceed 7 cm in length and 8 cm in width. It is not stoloniferous. Its leaves are thick and leathery, round to kidney-shaped or broadly heart-shaped. The leaf blade is 17-18 cm long and 19-21 cm wide. In deeper water, they can grow up to 35 cm. The margin is dentate and has uneven, blunt teeth, although towards the apex the margin is almost entirely smooth. It is the sole member of its subgenus featuring leaves with dentate margins. However, it also produces submerged leaves with entire margins, if it grows in flowing water. The adaxial leaf surface is shiny and light green with some red colouration in the centre and towards the edge. Younger leaves exhibit brownish red spotting. The abaxial leaf surface, which features protruding leaf venation, displays a brownish-purple colouration with irregular spotting. The petiole is reddish-brown, up to 9 or 11 mm wide, glabrous and has 2 primary, as well as 4 to numerous secondary air canals. From each leaf base, 6-7 roots emerge.

=== Generative characteristics ===
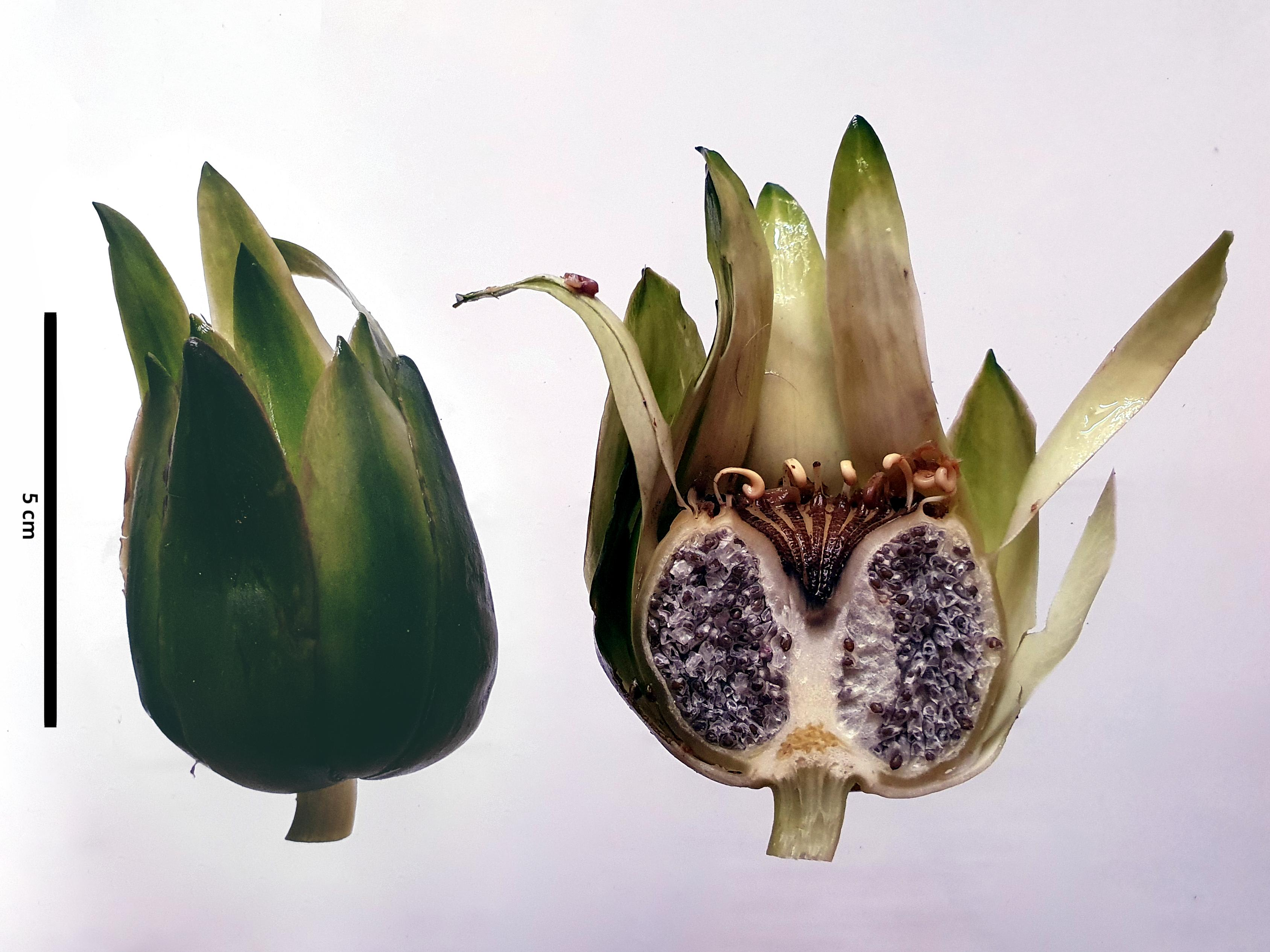
Halved Nymphaea rudgeana G.Mey. fruit with scale bar (5 cm) against a grey background

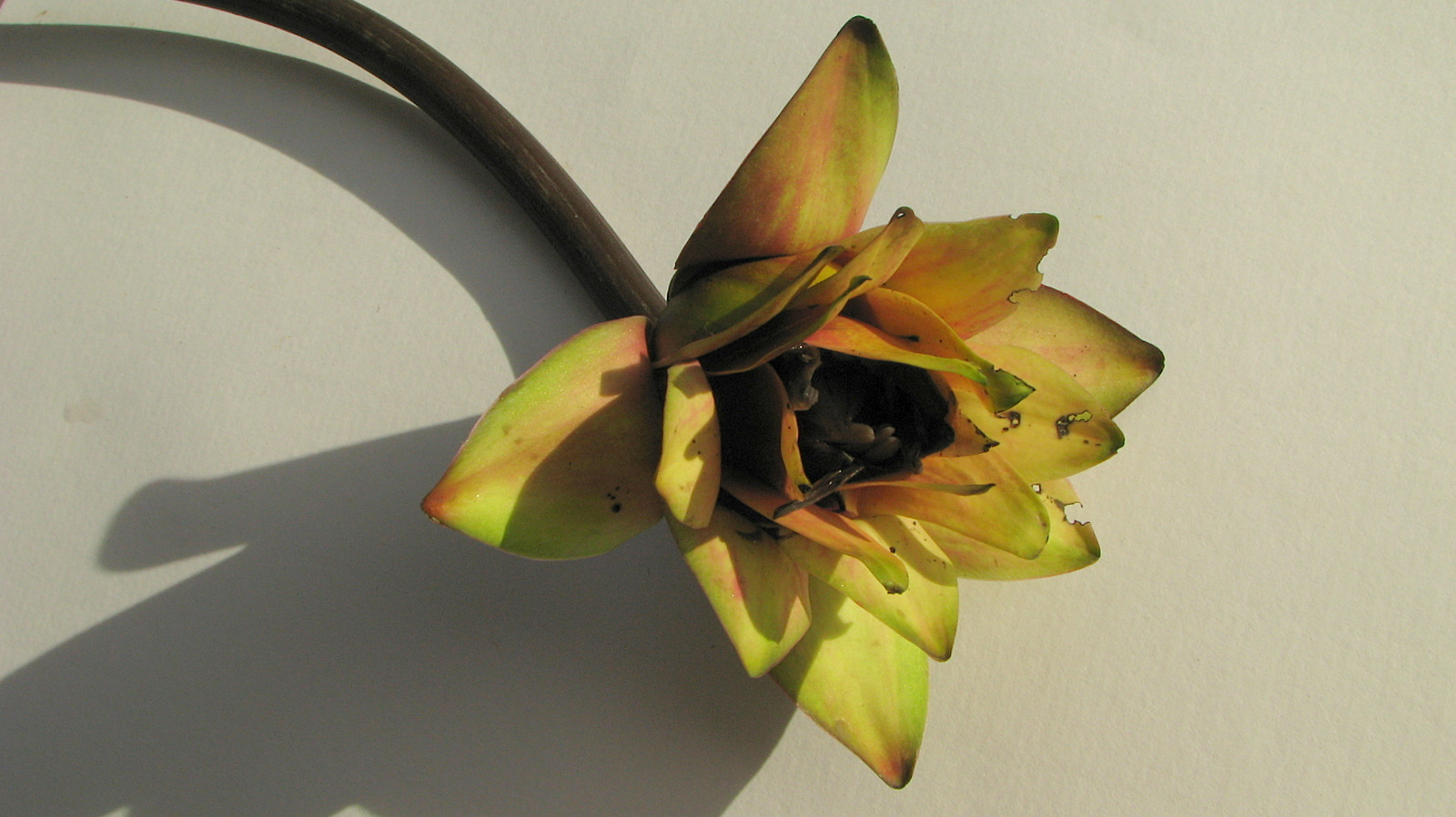
Nymphaea rudgeana G.Mey. fruit

The flower has four green or pink sepals, with or without blackish stripes. They are elliptic in shape with an acute to obtuse apex. The white to pink petals are gradually transitioning into stamens. The floral fragrance has been described as lemon scented. The rich, fruity odour is said to resemble the fragrance of Nymphaea amazonum.

== Cytology ==
The diploid chromosome count is 2n = 42.

== Reproduction ==
=== Vegetative reproduction ===
Asexual reproduction is not known to occur in this species. Both stolons and proliferating pseudanthia are absent in this species.

=== Generative reproduction ===
Cross pollination of the protogynous flowers occurs frequently. However, since the stigma remains receptive in the second day, which is when the pollen is released, autogamy is possible as well. The seeds are very numerous. In one case, 4365 seeds were found in a single fruit. A range of 1000 to 8000 seeds has also been reported.

== Habitat ==
It can grow in salty or brackish water. It has been observed growing in shallow waters of 20-100 cm in depth at river margins. It has also been found growin in an artificial lake with slight water flow.

== Taxonomy ==
=== Type specimen ===
The type specimen was collected in Guyana by Rodschied.

=== Placement within Nymphaea ===
It is a member of Nymphaea subg. Hydrocallis. However, it was speculated that Nymphaea rudgeana may be an ancient hybrid involving Nymphaea subgenus Lotos.

== Etymology ==
The specific epithet rudgeana honours Anne Rudge.

== Ecology ==
=== Pollination ===
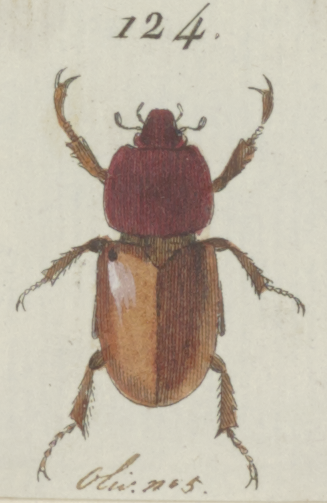
Cyclocephala castanea, a pollinator of Nymphaea rudgeana

The beetle species Cyclocephala castanea and Cyclocephala verticalis visit Nymphaea rudgeana flowers. The insects are not trapped inside the flowers overnight. There have however been reports of consistently finding dead insects within the flowers.

== Conservation ==
In Puerto Rico it is a rare species facing habitat destruction. The IUCN conservation status is not evaluated (NE).

== Uses ==
Foliage and flowers are used as emollients by the Palikur people of French Guiana. Various other ethnobotanical uses were also reported: Decoctions were used for cases of morphea, as a drink it was used against erysipelas, and it has been used as treatment of facial tumours, toothaches and leprous wounds. The seeds are used as food by native people.

== Cultivation ==
It is very rare in cultivation, although it may be easily cared for. It should be cultivated in high light conditions in rich, loamy fertile substrate at temperatures of 23 - 29 °C.
