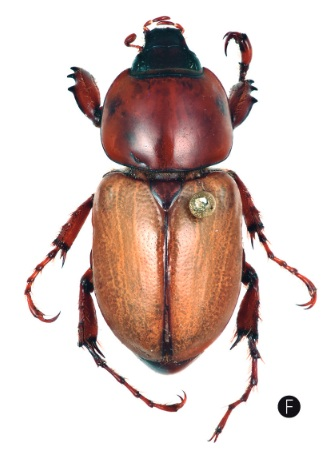

Scientific classification
- Kingdom: Animalia
- Phylum: Arthropoda
- Clade: Pancrustacea
- Class: Insecta
- Order: Coleoptera
- Suborder: Polyphaga
- Infraorder: Scarabaeiformia
- Family: Scarabaeidae
- Genus: Cyclocephala
- Species: C. pygidialis

Binomial name
- Cyclocephala pygidialis Joly, 2000

= Cyclocephala pygidialis =

Species of beetle

Cyclocephala pygidialis is a species of beetle of the family Scarabaeidae. It is found in Venezuela (Guarico, Monagas).
