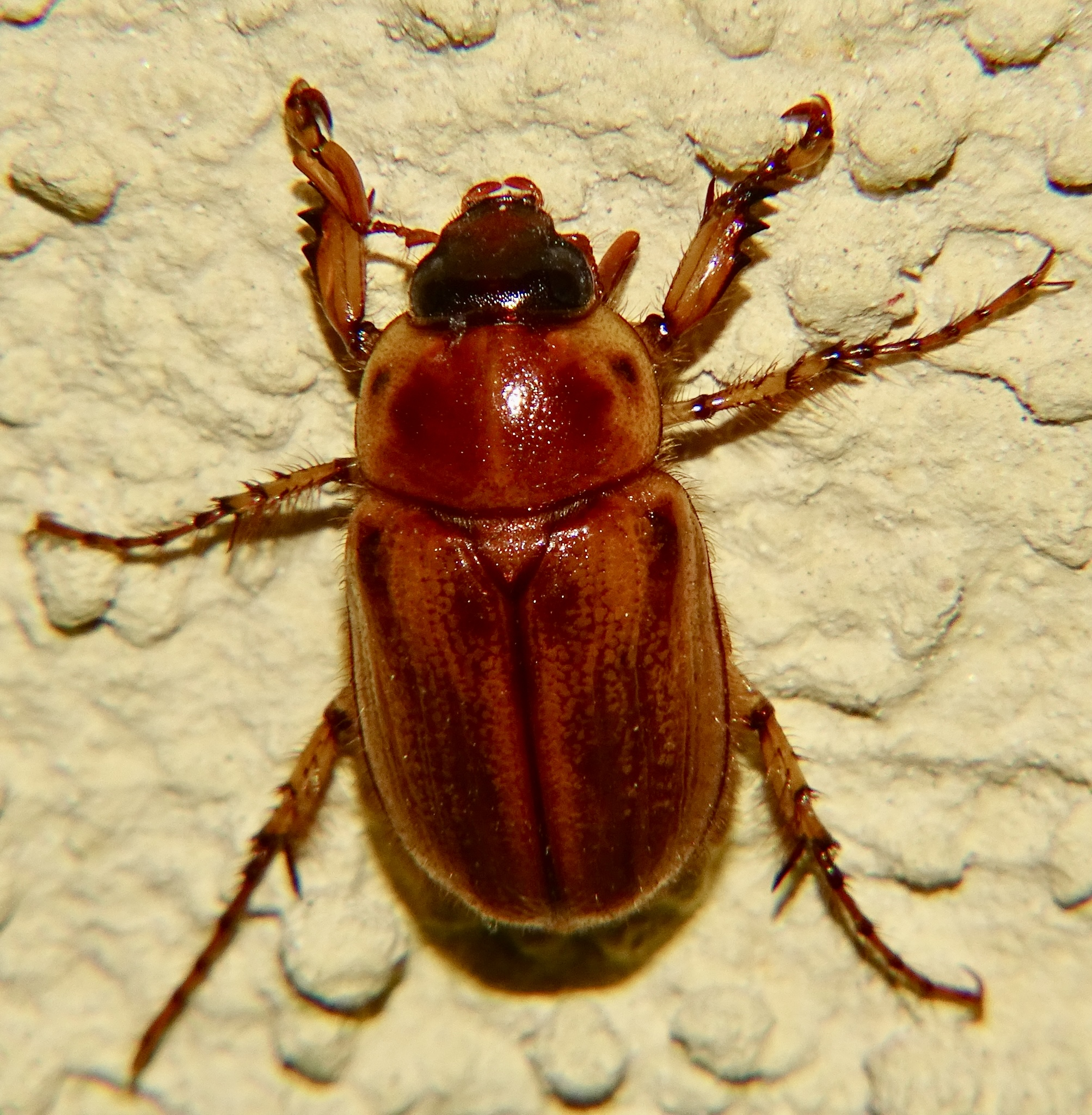

Scientific classification
- Kingdom: Animalia
- Phylum: Arthropoda
- Clade: Pancrustacea
- Class: Insecta
- Order: Coleoptera
- Suborder: Polyphaga
- Infraorder: Scarabaeiformia
- Family: Scarabaeidae
- Genus: Cyclocephala
- Species: C. pasadenae

Binomial name
- Cyclocephala pasadenae (Casey, 1915)

Synonyms
- Cyclocephala mexica Martínez, 1969; Ochrosidia arizonica Casey, 1915; Ochrosidia facilis Casey, 1915; Ochrosidia melina Casey, 1915; Ochrosidia ovulata Casey, 1915; Ochrosidia pusilla Casey, 1915; Ochrosidia validiceps Casey, 1915

= Cyclocephala pasadenae =

Species of beetle

Cyclocephala pasadenae, also known as the Pasadena masked chafer, is a species of rhinoceros beetle in the family Scarabaeidae. Native to southwestern North America, they and their cousins Cyclocephala hirta are locally abundant in the Los Angeles basin. These are tan or auburn colored beetles, about 13 mm long, with some patterning on their wing covers.
