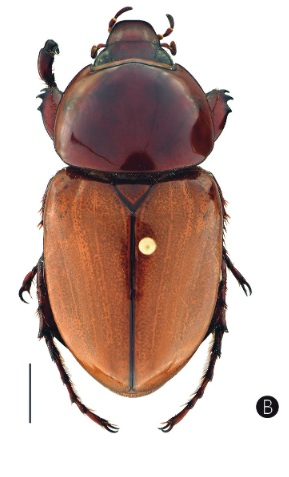

Scientific classification
- Kingdom: Animalia
- Phylum: Arthropoda
- Clade: Pancrustacea
- Class: Insecta
- Order: Coleoptera
- Suborder: Polyphaga
- Infraorder: Scarabaeiformia
- Family: Scarabaeidae
- Genus: Cyclocephala
- Species: C. figueroai

Binomial name
- Cyclocephala figueroai Paz-Ordoñez & Grossi, 2026

= Cyclocephala figueroai =

Species of beetle

Cyclocephala figueroai is a species of beetle of the family Scarabaeidae. It is found in Peru (Loreto).

== Description ==
Adults reach a length of about 24.5 mm (0.96 in). The dorsal surface is strongly shiny, with the head, pronotum, scutellum, legs and ventral surface dark red, while the elytra are dark yellow.

== Etymology ==
The species is dedicated to Luis Figueroa Reynoso, esteemed entomologist and mentor, in recognition of his significant contributions to the study of Peruvian Scarabaeidae.
