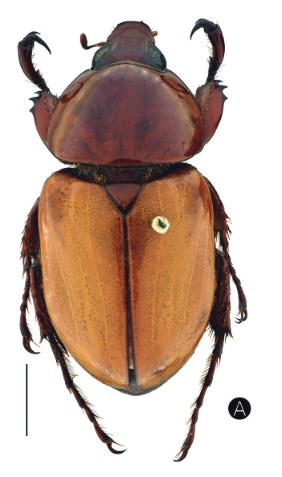

Scientific classification
- Kingdom: Animalia
- Phylum: Arthropoda
- Clade: Pancrustacea
- Class: Insecta
- Order: Coleoptera
- Suborder: Polyphaga
- Infraorder: Scarabaeiformia
- Family: Scarabaeidae
- Genus: Cyclocephala
- Species: C. castanea

Binomial name
- Cyclocephala castanea (Olivier, 1789)

Synonyms
- Melolontha castanea Olivier, 1789; Cyclocephala latipes Laporte, 1840; Melolontha valida Schönherr, 1817; Melolontha elongata Olivier, 1789

= Cyclocephala castanea =

Species of beetle

Cyclocephala castanea is a species of small beetle in the family Scarabaeidae which is native to the Amazon basin in South America. This beetle and certain others in the same genus have a commensal relationship with the large water lily Victoria amazonica. Visiting the flower for food, the beetles are trapped inside and emerge laden with pollen the following evening.

== Ecology ==
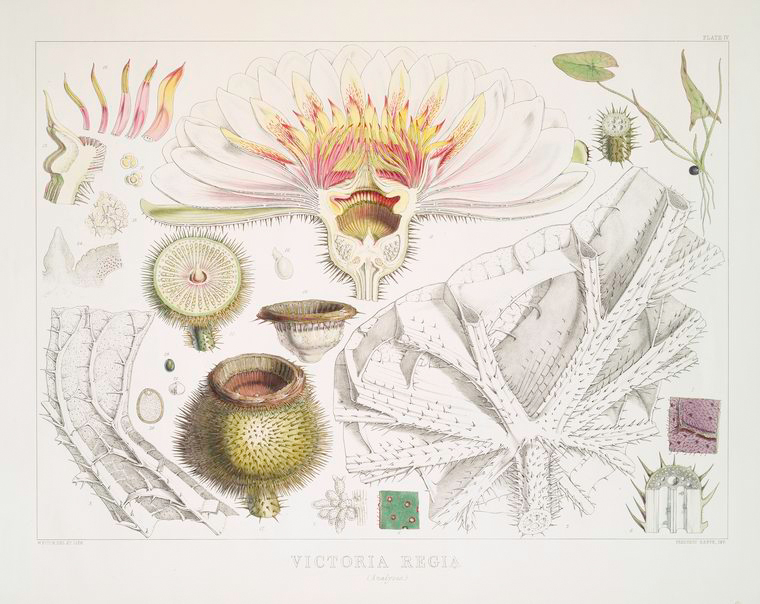
Illustration of Victoria amazonica by Walter Hood Fitch

Cyclocephala castanea, and the closely related Cyclocephala hardyi, have co-evolved with the giant water lily Victoria amazonica, found in shallow waters in the Amazon basin. The flowers are nocturnal and float on the surface of the water. They are creamy-white and have a strong fragrance when they first open. The beetles are attracted to the flowers which have a high temperature, up to 10 °C (18 °F) warmer than their surroundings, and which contain starch-rich appendages called paracarpels. At the end of the night the flowers close and the beetles are trapped by the petals. When the flowers reopen the next night, they are pinkish-red or purple, no longer warmer than their surroundings, the fragrance has gone, and the stigmas are no longer receptive. However, the stamens are loaded with pollen and the beetles, well-dusted with pollen, fly off to find other, white flowers which are more attractive to them, and which they will pollinate. The plant benefits from this arrangement because it avoids self-fertilisation, each plant unfurling a new flower every alternate evening. The beetles also benefit; they have a period to feast on the specialised food tissues provided for them by the plant, and plenty of time in close proximity with one another for mating.

Another water lily, Nymphaea rudgeana, is similarly pollinated by C. castanea. Additionally, there have been reports of Cyclocephala castanea beetles visiting Nymphaea glandulifera flowers in Surinam.
