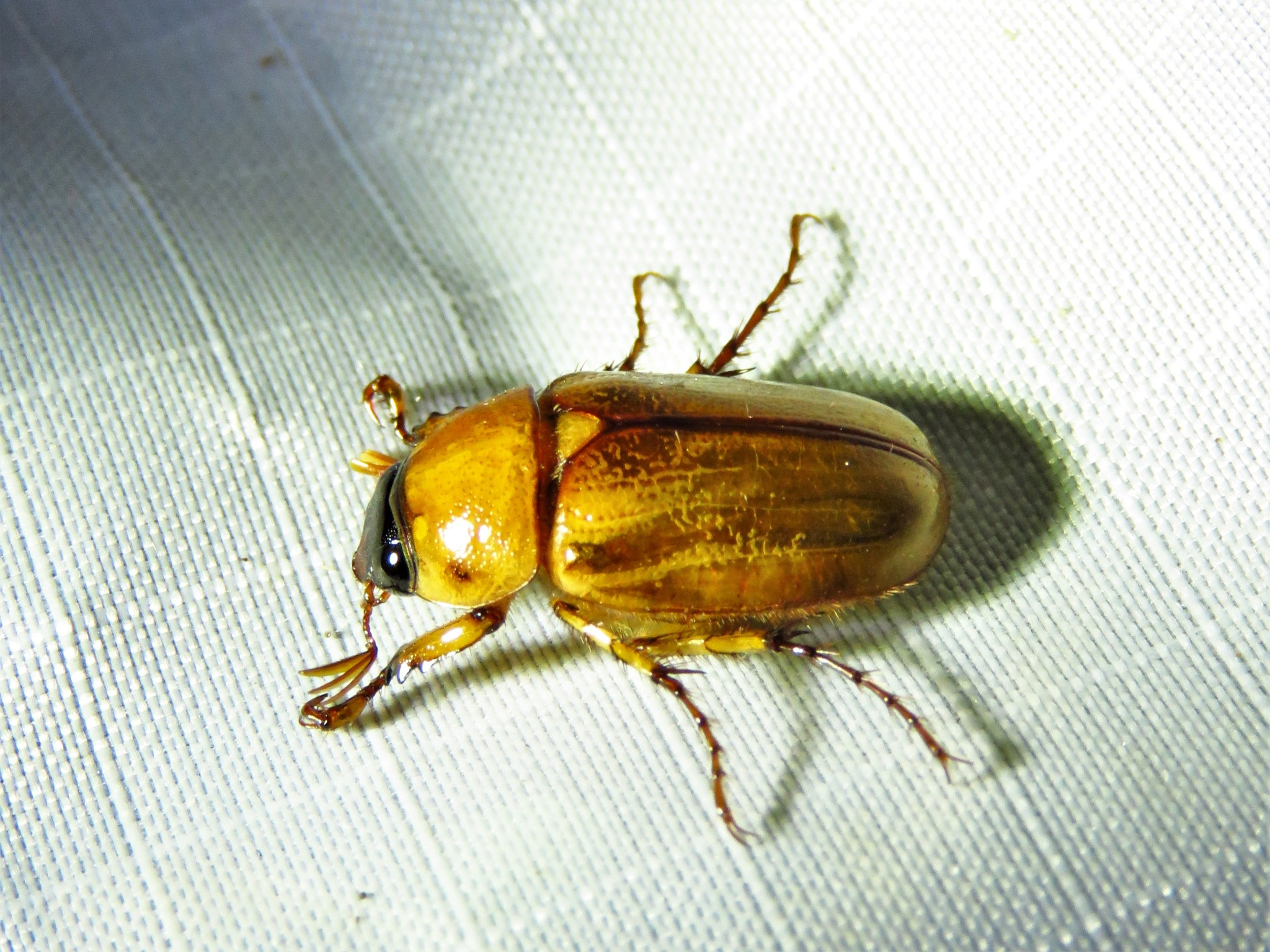

Scientific classification
- Kingdom: Animalia
- Phylum: Arthropoda
- Clade: Pancrustacea
- Class: Insecta
- Order: Coleoptera
- Suborder: Polyphaga
- Infraorder: Scarabaeiformia
- Family: Scarabaeidae
- Genus: Cyclocephala
- Species: C. lurida

Binomial name
- Cyclocephala lurida Bland, 1863

= Cyclocephala lurida =

Species of beetle (southern masked chafer)

Cyclocephala lurida, the southern masked chafer, is a species of beetle in the family Scarabaeidae which is native to the southeastern United States. It is a brown beetle with a black head, with an adult length of 10 to 14 mm (0.4 to 0.6 in). The adult beetles cause no harm, but the eggs are laid underground and the developing larvae feed on grass roots and can kill turf under dry conditions.

== Life cycle ==
Female southern masked chafer beetles emerge from the soil soon after sunset in June and July, remaining on the surface of the ground or climbing up grasses. At much the same time, males emerge and make zig-zag flights low over the ground. The females emit a pheromone, a volatile substance that acts as an attractant to males. When a male has homed in on a female, mating takes place after which the female burrows back into the soil. Mated females lay their eggs underground. The growing larvae feed on grass roots until late spring the following year when they pupate, the adults emerging about a fortnight later. There is a single generation each year, the adults being active for a few weeks.

By 11pm during the breeding season, unmated females and all males move underground, and it has been found that after this time, unmated females retained in traps above ground start to attract male northern masked chafer (Cyclocephala borealis), a closely related species. This beetle normally mates after midnight and presumably uses the same pheromone for communication. Research shows that the larvae of the southern masked chafer also release pheromone, and if they happen to be on the surface, the adult males may attempt to mate with them. Adult males and larvae do not normally come in contact because the larvae remain entirely below ground and will usually have pupated before the adults emerge. However a bacterium present in the soil called milky spore (Paenibacillus popilliae) causes a developmental delay in the larvae, and it was these infected larvae that the researchers happened to see on the surface of the soil. It is thought that the ability to release pheromones, now known to be present in larvae of both sexes, is retained in the adult female but lost in the adult male.

== Damage ==
The larvae of the southern masked chafer are commonly known as white grubs and grow to a length of about 2.5 cm (1 in). The adult beetles are harmless, but the grubs feed on the roots of grasses (and sometimes other plants) and cause much damage. During wet periods, the grasses can keep growing new shoots and may look healthy, but in dry conditions, the plants cannot obtain enough moisture, become desiccated, turn brown and die. Tufts of dead grass can be pulled from the ground without effort. One possible approach to controlling this species is the use of entomopathogenic fungi; this has worked well in the laboratory but is proving more problematic in the field.

== Ecology ==
Along with the larvae of the Japanese beetle (Popillia japonica), the larvae of the southern masked chafer are considered the worst pests of turf in the midwestern United States. When populations of these insects are high, the larvae can cause the death of turf over large areas. It has been found that ants, particularly the thief ant (Solenopsis molesta), are predators on the eggs and larvae of these beetles. However, the application of insecticides before the season in which the beetles lay their eggs, results in a considerable decrease in natural predation. Damage to turf by these beetles is an annual problem, and locations that are regularly treated with organophosphate pesticides are nearly devoid of ants, so the natural control of the beetle eggs and larvae by the ants is lost.

Raccoons and skunks feed on the grubs, pulling up the turf as they do so.
