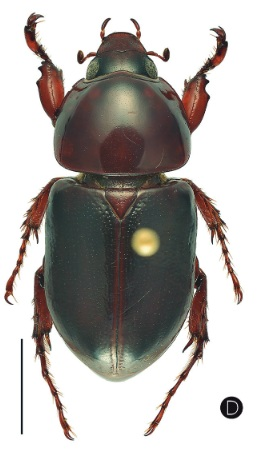

Scientific classification
- Kingdom: Animalia
- Phylum: Arthropoda
- Clade: Pancrustacea
- Class: Insecta
- Order: Coleoptera
- Suborder: Polyphaga
- Infraorder: Scarabaeiformia
- Family: Scarabaeidae
- Genus: Cyclocephala
- Species: C. kuijteni

Binomial name
- Cyclocephala kuijteni Hielkema, 2023

= Cyclocephala kuijteni =

Species of beetle

Cyclocephala kuijteni is a species of beetle of the family Scarabaeidae. It is found in Suriname (district of Para).
