= Cyclocephala parallela =

Scientific classification
- Kingdom: Animalia
- Phylum: Arthropoda
- Clade: Pancrustacea
- Class: Insecta
- Order: Coleoptera
- Suborder: Polyphaga
- Infraorder: Scarabaeiformia
- Family: Scarabaeidae
- Genus: Cyclocephala
- Species: C. parallela

Binomial name
- Cyclocephala parallela (Casey, 1915)

Synonyms
- Ochrosidia parallela Casey, 1915

Species of beetle

Cyclocephala parallela is a species of rhinoceros beetle in the family Scarabaeidae. It is found in the United States (Florida, Georgia, North Carolina, South Carolina).
