= Carvalhópolis =

Coordinates: 21.7778°S 45.8408°W

- Municipality
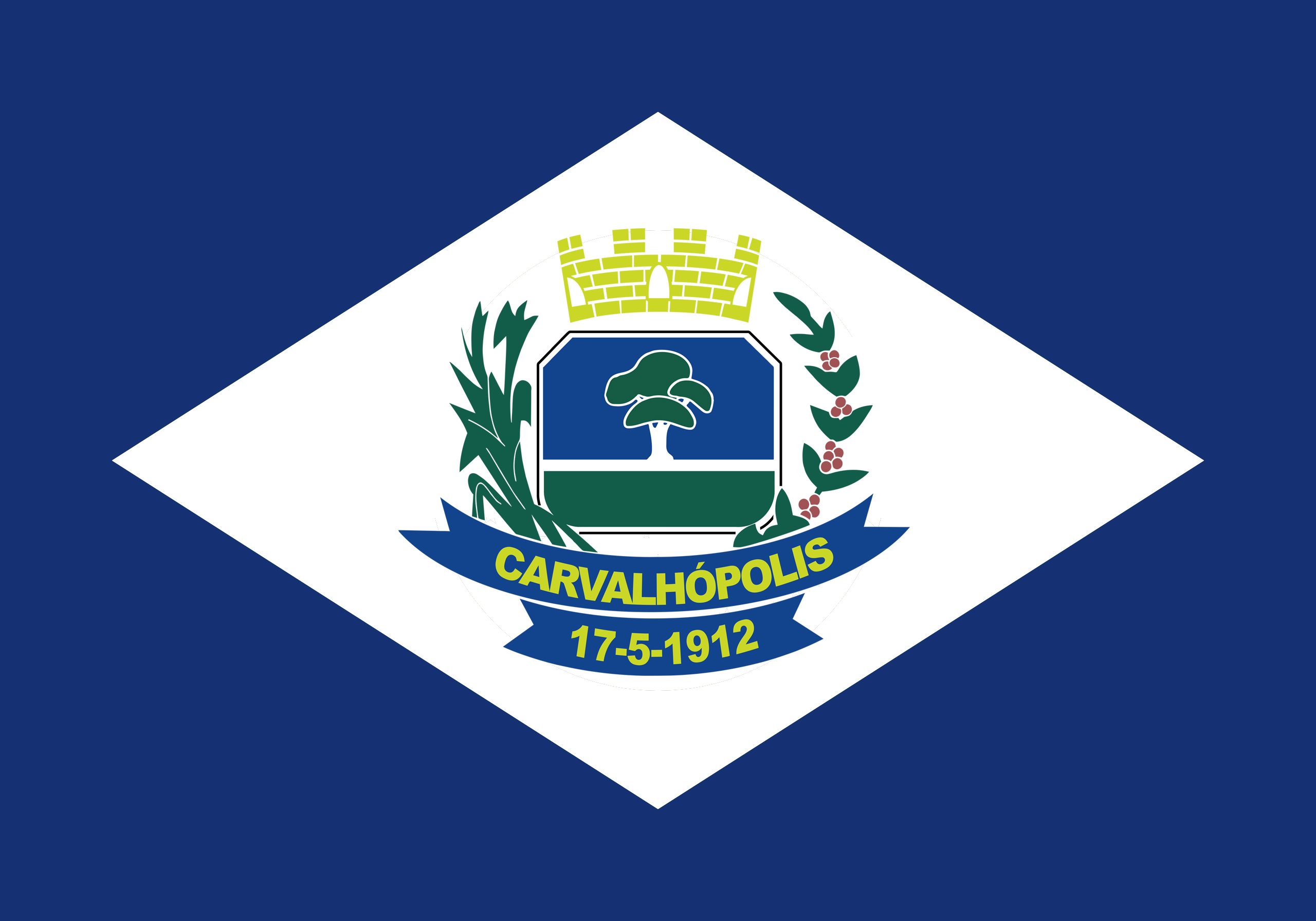
- Flag Coat of arms
- Interactive map of Carvalhópolis
- Country: Brazil
- Region: Southeast
- State: Minas Gerais
- Mesoregion: Sud/Sudoeste de Minas

Government
  - Mayor: José Antonio de Carvalho (DEM)

Population (2020)
  - Total: 3,597
- Time zone: UTC−3 (BRT)

Carvalhópolis is a municipality in the state of Minas Gerais in the Southeast region of Brazil.

== See also ==
- List of municipalities in Minas Gerais
