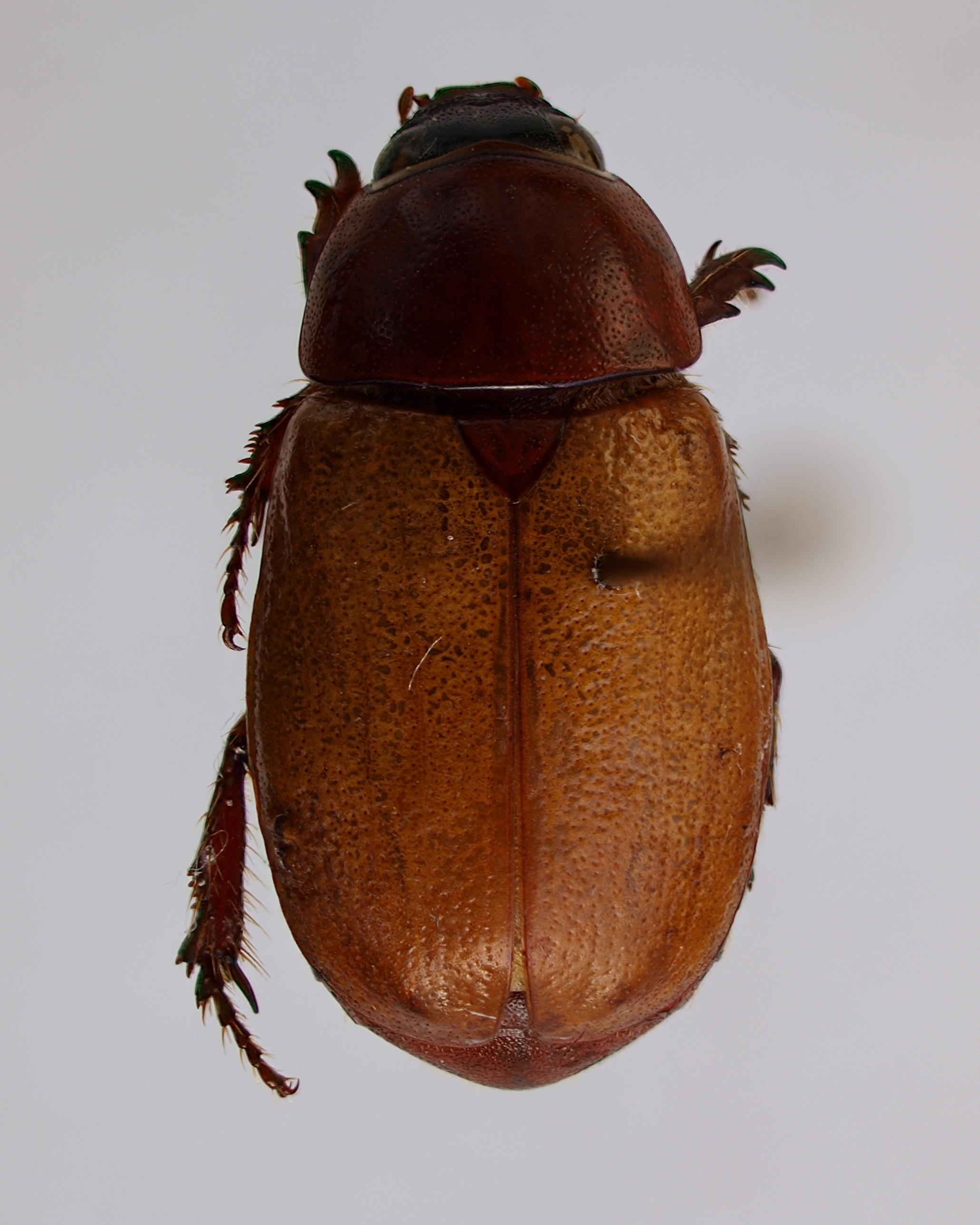
- Cyclocephala melanocephala, sex unknown

Scientific classification
- Kingdom: Animalia
- Phylum: Arthropoda
- Clade: Pancrustacea
- Class: Insecta
- Order: Coleoptera
- Suborder: Polyphaga
- Infraorder: Scarabaeiformia
- Family: Scarabaeidae
- Genus: Cyclocephala
- Species: C. melanocephala

Binomial name
- Cyclocephala melanocephala (Fabricius, 1775)

Synonyms
- Melolontha melanocephala Fabricius, 1775; Cyclocephala elegans Horn, 1871; Cyclocephala dimidiata Burmeister, 1847; Cyclocephala rubiginosa Burmeister, 1847; Cyclocephala ventralis Erichson, 1847; Chalepus leucophthalmus Fischer von Waldheim, 1823; Dichromina ocularis Casey, 1915

= Cyclocephala melanocephala =

Species of beetle

Cyclocephala melanocephala is a species of beetle in the subfamily Dynastinae. It is found in North and Central America. Adults typically feed on Helianthus annuus inflorescence.
