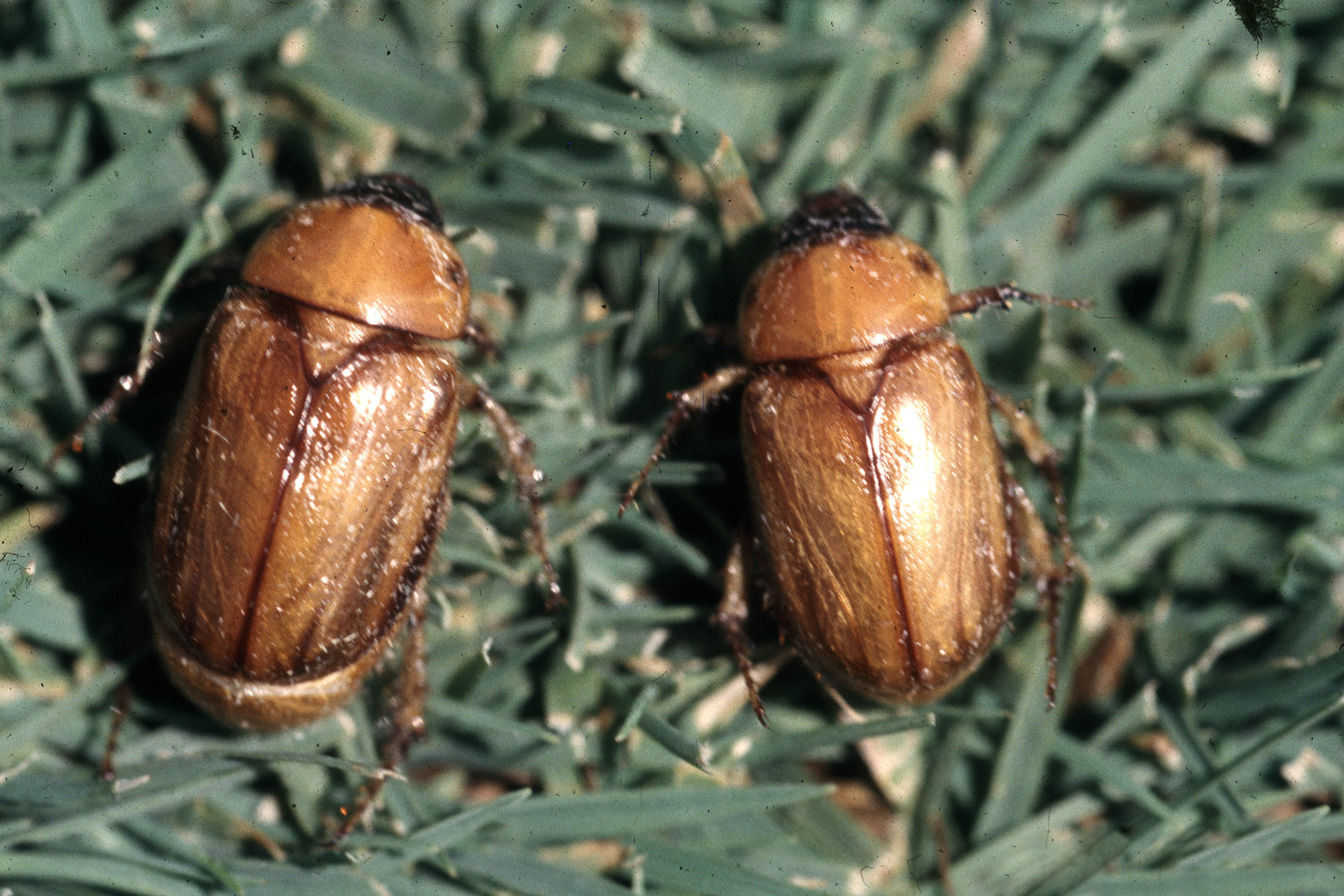

Scientific classification
- Kingdom: Animalia
- Phylum: Arthropoda
- Clade: Pancrustacea
- Class: Insecta
- Order: Coleoptera
- Suborder: Polyphaga
- Infraorder: Scarabaeiformia
- Family: Scarabaeidae
- Genus: Cyclocephala
- Species: C. hirta

Binomial name
- Cyclocephala hirta Leconte, 1861

Synonyms
- Spilosota inconspicua Casey, 1915; Spilosota magister Casey, 1915; Spilosota nubeculina Casey, 1915; Spilosota pallidissima Casey, 1915

= Cyclocephala hirta =

Species of beetle

Cyclocephala hirta is a species in the family Scarabaeidae ("scarab beetles"), in the order Coleoptera ("beetles"). C. hirta and cousin Cyclocephala pasadenae are among the most common "June beetles" found in the Los Angeles Basin.
