= Cyclocephala lunulata =

Scientific classification
- Kingdom: Animalia
- Phylum: Arthropoda
- Clade: Pancrustacea
- Class: Insecta
- Order: Coleoptera
- Suborder: Polyphaga
- Infraorder: Scarabaeiformia
- Family: Scarabaeidae
- Genus: Cyclocephala
- Species: C. lunulata

Binomial name
- Cyclocephala lunulata Burmeister, 1847

Synonyms
- Cyclocephala nubeculosa Burmeister, 1847; Ochrosidia oblita Casey, 1915

Species of beetle

Cyclocephala lunulata is a species of beetle in the family Scarabaeidae.

== Distribution ==
It has a wide range, from the southern United States (Arizona, Texas), through Central America, where it has been recorded from Belize, Costa Rica, El Salvador, Guatemala, Mexico (Aguascalientes, Baja California Sur, Campeche, Chiapas, Coahuila, Colima, Distrito Federal, Guanajuato, Guerrero, Hidalgo, Jalisco, México, Michoacán, Morelos, Nayarit, Oaxaca, Puebla, Querétaro, Quintana Roo, San Luis Potosí, Sinaloa, Sonora, Tabasco, Tamaulipas, Veracruz, Yucatán, Zacatecas), Honduras, Nicaragua and Panama, to South America, with records from Argentina, Bolivia, Brazil (Acre, Amazonas, Bahia, Espírito Santo, Goiás, Minas Gerais, Paraná, Rio de Janeiro, Rio Grande do Sul, Santa Catarina, São Paulo), Colombia, Ecuador, French Guiana, Guyana, Paraguay, Peru, Suriname, Trinidad & Tobago and Venezuela.
