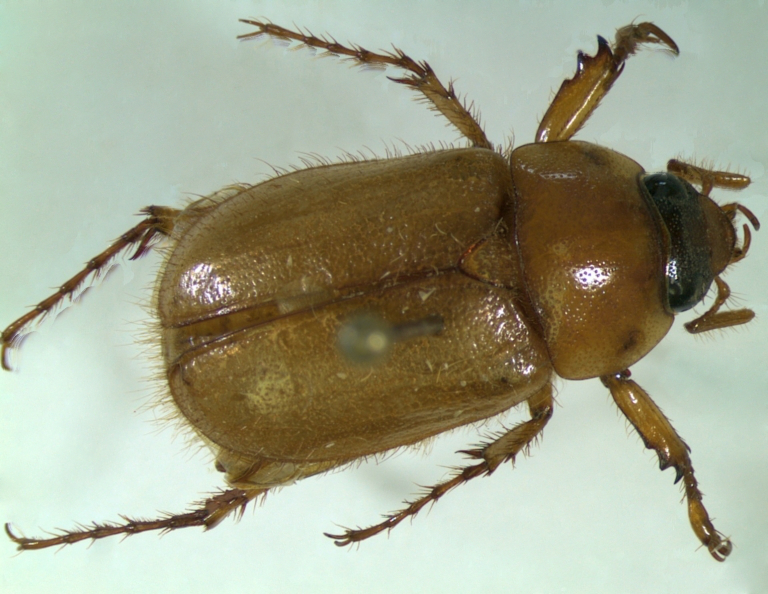
- Male northern masked chafer, museum specimen

Scientific classification
- Kingdom: Animalia
- Phylum: Arthropoda
- Clade: Pancrustacea
- Class: Insecta
- Order: Coleoptera
- Suborder: Polyphaga
- Infraorder: Scarabaeiformia
- Family: Scarabaeidae
- Genus: Cyclocephala
- Species: C. borealis

Binomial name
- Cyclocephala borealis Arrow, 1911

Synonyms
- Melolontha angularis Knoch, 1801; Cyclocephala villosa Burmeister, 1847

= Cyclocephala borealis =

Species of beetle

Cyclocephala borealis, the northern masked chafer, is a beetle in the family Scarabaeidae. It is native to North America, where it is considered a crop pest.

== Distribution ==
This species is native to North America, and specimens have been collected from Maine to California and as far south as Alabama.

== Description and life cycle ==
Adult northern masked chafers are 11 to 14 mm long and 6 to 7 mm wide. They are a dull yellow-brown with darker markings on the head and eyes, and their thoraxes and wing covers are hairy. The larvae eat plant roots and other matter near the soil surface. The adults do not feed.

The life cycle of the beetle usually begins with the emergence of adults starting in mid-June. Males come to the surface of the soil after sunset, before the females emerge. After emerging from the soil the unmated females climb a blade of grass and begin to release a sex pheromone to attract males. Multiple males will sometimes crowd a female releasing such pheromones, but only one will successfully copulate after having clasped the female with his forelegs, which feature an enlarged fifth tarsal segment for this purpose. This activity will continue until a few hours before sunrise at which point the males and females disperse. Mated individuals fly at night, males staying within around 60 cm of the ground while females will fly higher. Both sexes are strongly attracted to light. After mating females will dig 10 to 15 cm into the soil and lay a clutch of 11 to 14 pearly white oval eggs, each 1.7 mm long. With sufficient soil moisture eggs will swell in the first eight days to 2.1 mm in diameter, becoming nearly spherical. The eggs hatch within 14 to 18 days at temperatures of 70 to 75 degrees F. The resultant larvae are 4.5 mm long. They move to the soil surface to begin feeding on roots and other organic matter. Under ideal conditions the larvae grow rapidly, up to 22–25 mm when maturing as third instars. Third instars are common by September. As temperatures begin to fall in autumn the larvae begin to dig down into the soil up to 30 cm to hibernate. From late-April to May the larvae which have survived winter return to the surface to feed, moving down again in late-May to early-June to pupate. Prior to pupating a larva will void its gut and the abdomen becomes very translucent. Forming within the old exoskeleton, which splits down the middle, the 17 mm long pupa will take about 17 days to mature, gradually changing from creamy white to reddish brown.

Cyclocephala borealis males were found to mate freely with females of the species Cyclocephala immaculata, which has morphologically indistinguishable larvae, in a laboratory. The resultant eggs appeared to develop normally; however, fully formed larvae never emerged from them.

== Economic significance ==
=== Pest ===
Northern masked chafers are considered a common pest of turf and cereal crops from New England to Illinois. Most damage to turf occurs in September and October and again in spring.

=== As food ===
This beetle is recognized as being edible to humans.

== Taxonomy ==
Cyclocephala borealis was first described by Hermann Burmeister as Cyclocephala villosa. As another species from Bolivia had already been given that name it was renamed borealis by Gilbert John Arrow.
