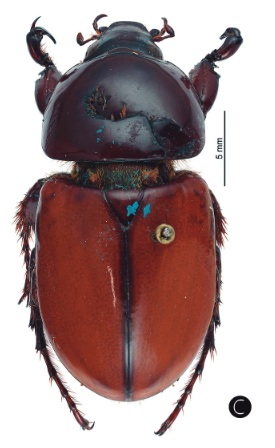

Scientific classification
- Kingdom: Animalia
- Phylum: Arthropoda
- Clade: Pancrustacea
- Class: Insecta
- Order: Coleoptera
- Suborder: Polyphaga
- Infraorder: Scarabaeiformia
- Family: Scarabaeidae
- Genus: Cyclocephala
- Species: C. hardyi

Binomial name
- Cyclocephala hardyi Endrödi, 1975

= Cyclocephala hardyi =

Species of beetle

Cyclocephala hardyi is a species of beetle of the family Scarabaeidae. It is found in Guyana (Upper Takutu‑Upper Essequibo) and Brazil (Amazonas).
