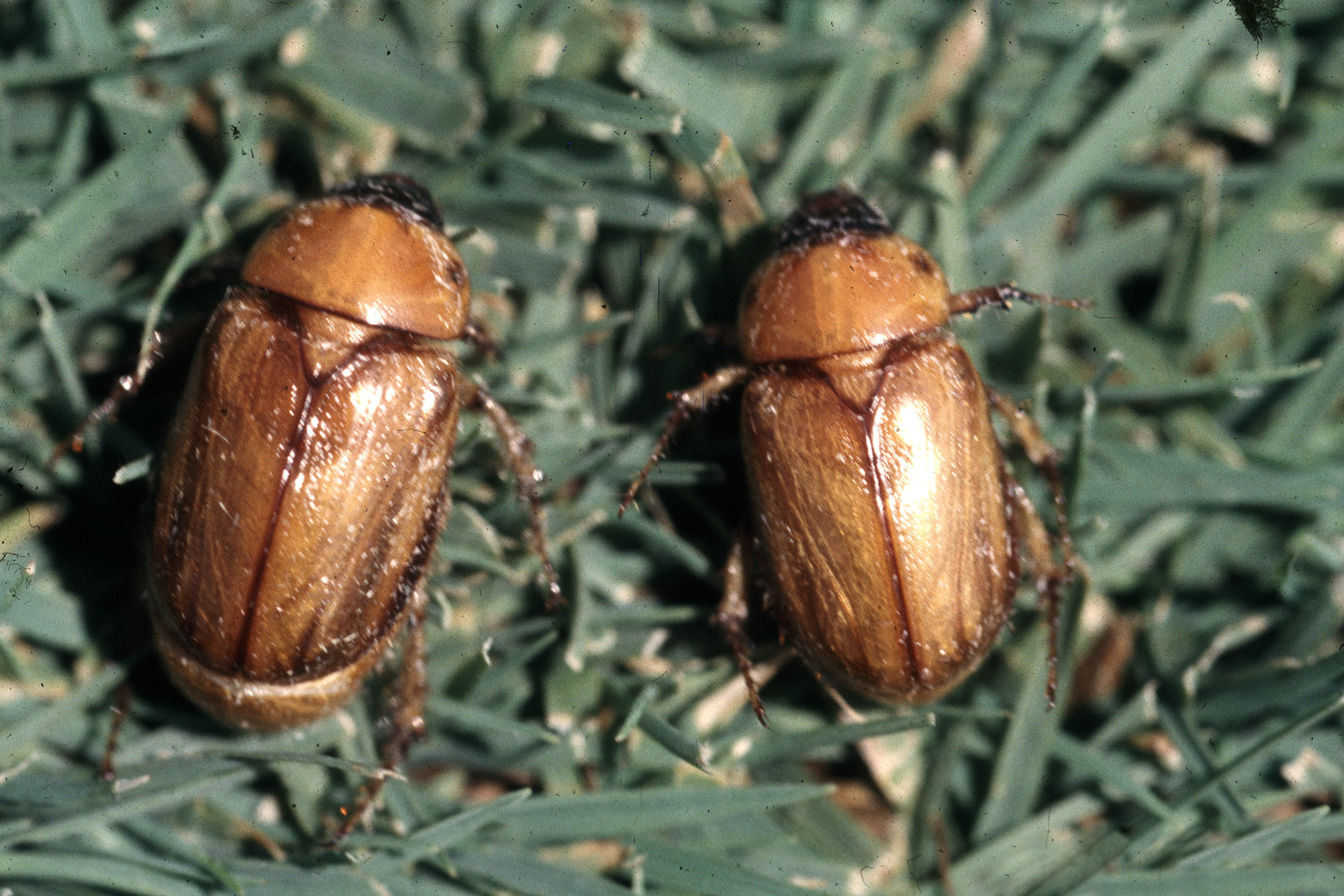
- Western masked chafer (Cyclocephala hirta)

Scientific classification
- Kingdom: Animalia
- Phylum: Arthropoda
- Clade: Pancrustacea
- Class: Insecta
- Order: Coleoptera
- Suborder: Polyphaga
- Infraorder: Scarabaeiformia
- Family: Scarabaeidae
- Subfamily: Dynastinae
- Genus: Cyclocephala; Dejean, 1821

Species
- Many, see text

Synonyms
- Mononidia Casey 1915; Diapatalia Casey 1915; Stigmalia Casey 1915; Spilosota Casey 1915; Ochrosidia Casey 1915; Dichromina Casey 1915; Homochromina Casey 1915; Plagiosalia Casey 1915; Isocoryna Casey 1915; Graphalia Casey 1915; Aclinidia Casey 1915; Halotosia Casey 1915; Aspidotites Höhne 1922; Aspidolella Prell 1936; Albridarollia Bolivar y Pieltaín, Jiménez-Asúa, and Martínez 1963; Paraclimidia Martínez 1965

= Cyclocephala =

Genus of beetles

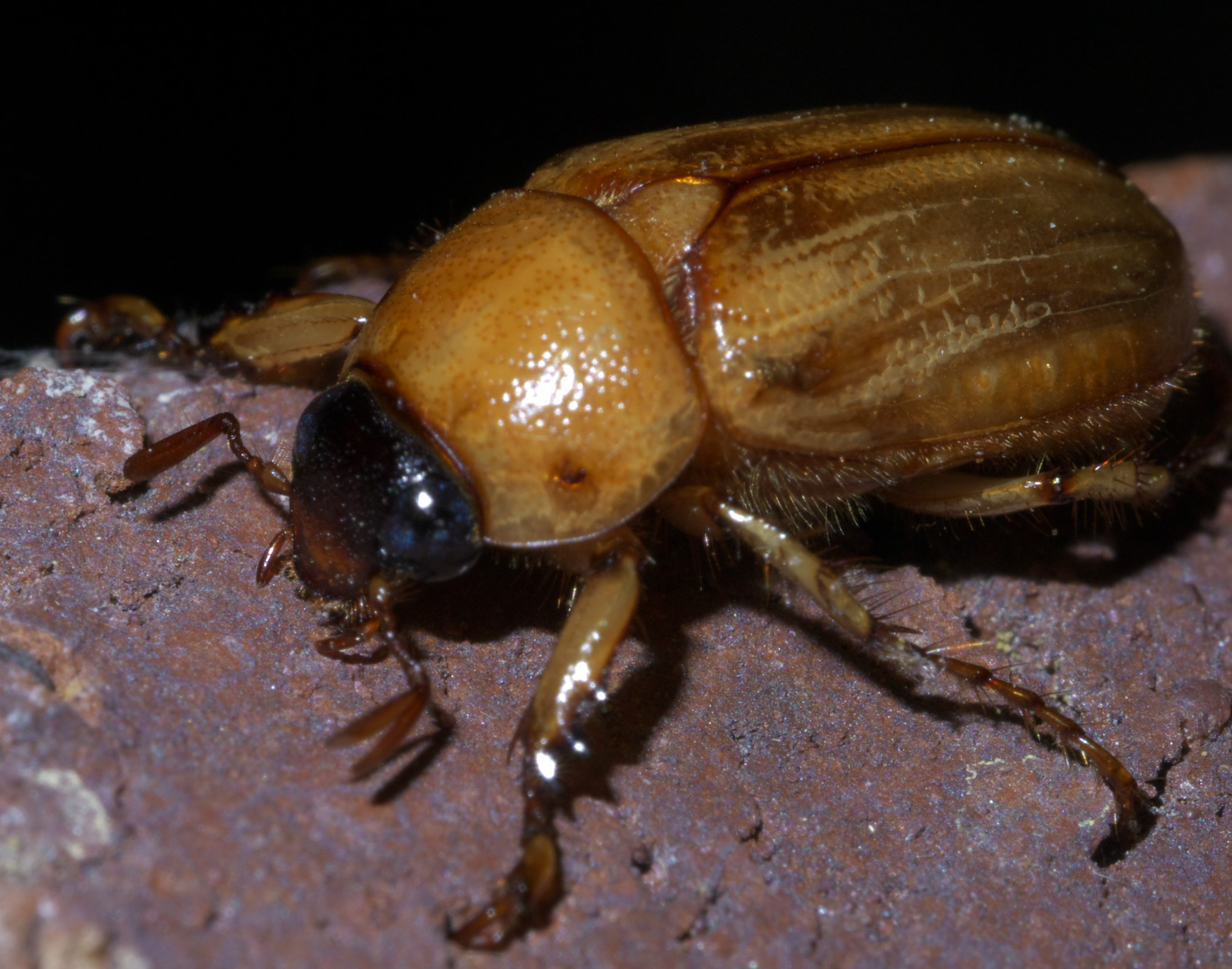
Masked chafers, Cyclocephala

Cyclocephala is a genus of scarab beetles from the subfamily Dynastinae (Coleoptera, Scarabaeidae). Beetles of this genus occur from southeastern Canada to Argentina, India and the West Indies.

Adults of this genus are nocturnal or crepuscular, and are usually attracted to lights.

== Taxonomy ==
It was published by Pierre François Marie Auguste Dejean in 1821. It is the type genus of the tribe Cyclocephalini.

=== Selected species ===
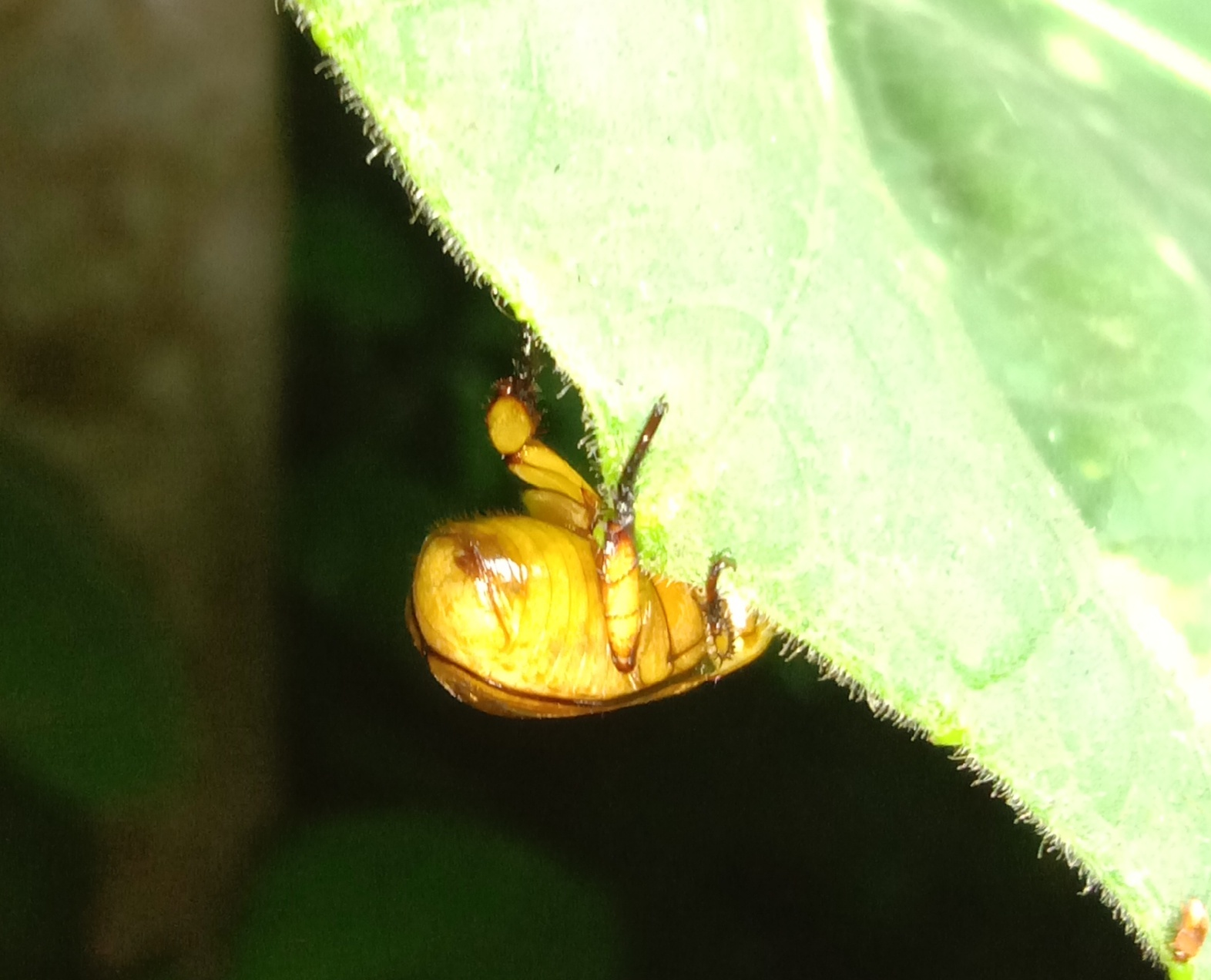
Cyclocephala captured at night

This is a large genus and new species continue to be added.

- Cyclocephala almitana
- Cyclocephala amazona
- Cyclocephala amblyopsis
- Cyclocephala atripes
- Cyclocephala atripes
- Cyclocephala barroensis
- Cyclocephala brittoni
- Cyclocephala borealis - Northern masked chafer
- Cyclocephala carbonaria
- Cyclocephala cartwrighti
- Cyclocephala castanea
- Cyclocephala castaniella
- Cyclocephala colasi
- Cyclocephala complanata
- Cyclocephala concolor
- Cyclocephala confusa
- Cyclocephala conspicua
- Cyclocephala discicollis
- Cyclocephala discolor
- Cyclocephala dispar (Herbst, 1790) (= C.dorsalis)
- Cyclocephala elegans
- Cyclocephala epistomalis
- Cyclocephala erotylina
- Cyclocephala fasciolata
- Cyclocephala fulgurata
- Cyclocephala gravis
- Cyclocephala gregaria
- Cyclocephala hardyi
- Cyclocephala herteli
- Cyclocephala hirta - Western masked chafer
- Cyclocephala howdeni
- Cyclocephala kaszabi
- Cyclocephala krombeini
- Cyclocephala laminata
- Cyclocephala ligyrina
- Cyclocephala lunulata
- Cyclocephala lurida
- Cyclocephala macrophylla
- Cyclocephala maffafa
- Cyclocephala melanae
- Cyclocephala melanocephala
- Cyclocephala modesta
- Cyclocephala nigerrima
- Cyclocephala nigritarsis
- Cyclocephala nigrobasalis
- Cyclocephala nodanotherwon
- Cyclocephala pan
- Cyclocephala pardolocarnoi
- Cyclocephala porioni
- Cyclocephala prolongata
- Cyclocephala puberula
- Cyclocephala pubescens
- Cyclocephala putrida
- Cyclocephala quadripunctata
- Cyclocephala rubescens
- Cyclocephala rufonigra De Mey, 1838 (may belong in C.dispar)
- Cyclocephala sanguinicollis
- Cyclocephala santaritae
- Cyclocephala sexpunctata
- Cyclocephala signaticollis
- Cyclocephala sparsa
- Cyclocephala spermophila
- Cyclocephala stictica
- Cyclocephala testacea
- Cyclocephala variabilis
- Cyclocephala weidneri
- Cyclocephala zodion

== Etymology ==
The generic name Cyclocephala means "round head".

== Ecology ==
=== Pollination ===
Flowers of Nymphaea subg. Hydrocallis are pollinated by Cyclocephala beetles. Likewise, flowers of Victoria are pollinated by Cyclocephala.

=== Predation ===
Several species of Cyclocephala serve as hosts for the parasitic larvae of the South American robber fly Mallophora ruficauda, especially C. signaticollis.

=== Herbivory ===
The larvae are root feeders.

== See also ==
- List of Cyclocephala species
