= Brett Ratcliffe =

American entomologist (1946-)

Brett Charles Ratcliffe (born 1946) is a British-born US entomologist who specializes in beetles. He was a professor and curator at the University of Nebraska until his retirement in 2023.

== Background ==
Ratcliffe was born on 18 March 1946 in Bedford, England. His mother was English and his father was American. He grew up in Warner Robins, Georgia, where he first developed a fascination with insects. After moving with his family to Tokyo, Japan, he began collecting insects with other American and Japanese teenagers. Upon moving to Roswell, New Mexico, he became interested in beetles in particular. He studied entomology at the University of Nebraska, gaining a Bachelor of Science degree in 1968, a Master of Science degree in 1970, and a Doctor of Philosophy degree in 1975.

== Career ==
Ratcliffe specializes in beetles, especially neotropical scarab beetles, and their biodiversity. From 1971 until 2017, Ratcliffe conducted field research throughout South and Central America, the West Indies, South Africa, Western Europe, and Japan. In the 1970s, he spent two years working at the National Institute of Amazonian Research in Brazil, where he moved with his wife and two children. He worked as a professor and curator at the University of Nebraska until his retirement in 2023.

On the subject of beetle biodiversity, he has authored 250 academic journal articles and 13 books. He has described 240 new scarab species, and 25 species have been named in his honor by other scientists. He named three Gymnetis species—G. drogoni, G. rhaegali, and G. viserioni—after the dragons of Daenerys Targaryen from the book series A Song of Ice and Fire and the TV series Game of Thrones, of both of which he is a fan; he did this believing "that scientists take themselves too seriously" and "to gain a little bit of notoriety and bring public attention to [biodiversity]". He also described the extinct Tyrannasorus rex from a specimen found in amber, killed by plant sap. Other humorous names published by Ratcliffe include Strategus longichomperus (the long-chomper), Amblyoproctus boondocksius (found "in the boondocks"), and Cyclocephala nodanotherwon (not another one).

Ratcliffe has received numerous honours for his contributions to entomology, including the J. O. Westwood Medal from the Royal Entomological Society and several awards from the University of Nebraska.
