= Astrothelium quintosulphureum =

Scientific classification
- Kingdom: Fungi
- Division: Ascomycota
- Class: Dothideomycetes
- Order: Trypetheliales
- Family: Trypetheliaceae
- Genus: Astrothelium
- Species: A. quintosulphureum

Binomial name
- Astrothelium quintosulphureum Aptroot & M.Cáceres (2022)
- Holotype: Adolfo Ducke Forest Reserve, Brazil

Species of lichen-forming fungus

Astrothelium quintosulphureum is a corticolous (bark-dwelling) lichen in the family Trypetheliaceae. Described in 2022 from specimens collected in primary rainforest near Manaus (Brazil), this species is distinguished by its internal yellow pigment and ascospores divided into five segments. It forms glossy, olive-green patches on tree bark, with clusters of fruiting bodies embedded in raised structures that turn blood red when treated with potassium hydroxide solution. Known only from the Adolfo Ducke Forest Reserve in the central Amazon, it grows on tree trunks in lowland rainforest.

== Taxonomy ==
Astrothelium quintosulphureum was described in 2022 by André Aptroot and Marcelo Cáceres from material collected on tree bark in primary rainforest in the Adolfo Ducke Forest Reserve near Manaus, Amazonas, Brazil, at an elevation of about 50 m (160 ft). The holotype (specimen M.E.S. Cáceres 50699 & A. Aptroot) is deposited in the herbarium of the National Institute of Amazonian Research (INPA 284620). The species is characterized within Astrothelium by having fruiting bodies (ascomata) clustered in raised structures (pseudostromata), an inner tissue layer (medulla) with a yellow pigment, and spores divided into five segments with diamond-shaped compartments (lumina) between the dividing walls; it keys out in the world treatment of the genus in a couplet defined by those characters. The specific epithet quintosulphureum refers to the combination of 5-septate ascospores and the yellow, sulfur-colored pigment in the medulla.

== Description ==
The thallus of Astrothelium quintosulphureum is glossy, olivaceous green, smooth and continuous, occupying areas up to about 7 cm (2.8 in) across while remaining only 0.1–0.2 mm thick; it is not surrounded by a distinct prothallus, although a thin black prothallus line may be present at the margin. The ascomata are globose to pyriform, 0.2–0.4 mm in diameter, and are immersed in well-developed pseudostromata. These pseudostromata emerge from the surface, are completely covered by a thick thallus layer, round to lobed in outline, 0.5–2.7 × 0.5–2.6 mm in extent and 0.2–0.6 mm high, and each contains 2–25 ascomata with separate ostioles; internally they are filled with yellow crystals. The ostioles are apical, single, and black. The hamathecium is not inspersed with oil droplets. Ascospores are produced eight per ascus; they are hyaline, long-ellipsoid, 5-septate, measure 45–51 × 11–12.5 μm, have diamond-shaped lumina between the septa, and lack a surrounding gelatinous sheath. Pycnidia were not observed. Standard spot tests on the thallus are negative (UV−, C−, P−, K−), but the yellow pigment in the pseudostromata reacts K+ blood red, and thin-layer chromatography detects an anthraquinone as the main lichen substance.

== Habitat and distribution ==
Astrothelium quintosulphureum is known only from the type locality in the central Brazilian Amazon. It grows on tree bark in lowland primary rainforest at about 50 m (160 ft) elevation, where it forms patches of thallus with emergent pseudostromata on trunks along forest trails. Additional specimens have been collected from the same reserve, but no occurrences have yet been reported outside Brazil. A national checklist published in 2025 likewise recorded no additional occurrences.
