= Vantanea spichigeri =

Conservation status
- Vulnerable (IUCN 3.1)

Scientific classification
- Kingdom: Plantae
- Clade: Tracheophytes
- Clade: Angiosperms
- Clade: Eudicots
- Clade: Rosids
- Order: Malpighiales
- Family: Humiriaceae
- Genus: Vantanea
- Species: V. spichigeri

Binomial name
- Vantanea spichigeri A. H. Gentry

Species of plant

Vantanea spichigeri is a species of plant in the Humiriaceae family. It is endemic to Peru.
