= Terminalia parvifolia =

Conservation status
- Least Concern (IUCN 3.1)

Scientific classification
- Kingdom: Plantae
- Clade: Tracheophytes
- Clade: Angiosperms
- Clade: Eudicots
- Clade: Rosids
- Order: Myrtales
- Family: Combretaceae
- Genus: Terminalia
- Species: T. parvifolia

Binomial name
- Terminalia parvifolia (Ducke) Gere & Boatwr.

Subspecies
- Terminalia parvifolia subsp. parvifolia; Terminalia parvifolia subsp. rabelloana (Mattos) Gere & Boatwr.

Synonyms
- Buchenavia parvifolia Ducke

Species of flowering plant

Terminalia parvifolia is a species of flowering plant in the family Combretaceae. It is a tree native to tropical South America, ranging from Colombia and Venezuela to Guyana, French Guiana, Ecuador, Peru, and northern and southeastern Brazil, It grows in lowland tropical rain forest.

Two subspecies are accepted:

- Terminalia parvifolia subsp. parvifolia – full range
- Terminalia parvifolia subsp. rabelloana (Mattos) Gere & Boatwr. – São Paulo state in southeastern Brazil

The species was first described as Buchenavia parvifolia by Adolpho Ducke in 1925. In 2017 Jephris Gere and James Stephen Boatwright merged genus Buchenavia into genus Terminalia and renamed the species Terminalia parvifolia.
