= Vantanea magdalenensis =

Conservation status
- Endangered (IUCN 3.1)

Scientific classification
- Kingdom: Plantae
- Clade: Tracheophytes
- Clade: Angiosperms
- Clade: Eudicots
- Clade: Rosids
- Order: Malpighiales
- Family: Humiriaceae
- Genus: Vantanea
- Species: V. magdalenensis

Binomial name
- Vantanea magdalenensis Cuatrec.

Species of flowering plant

Vantanea magdalenensis is a species of plant in the Humiriaceae family. It is endemic to Colombia.
