= Vantanea peruviana =

Conservation status
- Vulnerable (IUCN 3.1)

Scientific classification
- Kingdom: Plantae
- Clade: Tracheophytes
- Clade: Angiosperms
- Clade: Eudicots
- Clade: Rosids
- Order: Malpighiales
- Family: Humiriaceae
- Genus: Vantanea
- Species: V. peruviana

Binomial name
- Vantanea peruviana J. F. Macbr.

Species of tree

Vantanea peruviana is a species of plant in the Humiriaceae family. It is endemic to Peru.
