= Cyclocephala nodanotherwon =

Scientific classification
- Kingdom: Animalia
- Phylum: Arthropoda
- Clade: Pancrustacea
- Class: Insecta
- Order: Coleoptera
- Suborder: Polyphaga
- Infraorder: Scarabaeiformia
- Family: Scarabaeidae
- Genus: Cyclocephala
- Species: C. nodanotherwon

Binomial name
- Cyclocephala nodanotherwon Ratcliffe, 1992

Species of beetle

Cyclocephala nodanotherwon is a species of rhinoceros beetle in the scarab family. It has only been found in Amazonas, Brazil. Brett C. Ratcliffe described and named the species in 1992.

== Taxonomic history and etymology ==
Brett C. Ratcliffe, an entomologist at the University of Nebraska State Museum (UNSM), formally named and described this species, along with eight other Brazilian Cyclocephala species, in a 1992 paper. He based his description of C. nodanotherwon on three specimens, collected from 1980 to 1981 by Robin Best of the National Institute of Amazonian Research. The male holotype and female allotype were both deposited in the UNSM.

The specific name, nodanotherwon, is wordplay referring to the English phrase "not another one". Ratcliffe's description listed its etymology as "the result of an arbitrary combination of letters", but that it resulted in "a species name not inappropriate in such a large genus". Cyclocephala is the largest genus in the subfamily Dynastinae, with approximately 350 described species as of 2009; at least 240 Cyclocephala species had already been described by the time Ratcliffe wrote his description of C. nodanotherwon.

Various lists of humorous taxon names have included this species name as an example.

== Distribution ==
The type locality, where all three specimens in the initial description were collected, is Lago Anamã, in the Brazilian state of Amazonas about 160 km (99 mi) west-southwest of Manaus.

== Description ==
Their body is reddish-brown and leather-like, with triangular black marks near their eyes. Their antennae consist of ten segments. The males are 15.6–16.2 mm (0.61–0.64 in) long and 7.9–8.2 mm (0.31–0.32 in) wide; the female is 15.8 mm (0.62 in) long and 7.9 mm (0.31 in) wide. It is similar in appearance to C. gravis, C. munda, and C. divaricata.
