= Hylocarpa =

Conservation status
- Least Concern (IUCN 3.1)

Scientific classification
- Kingdom: Plantae
- Clade: Tracheophytes
- Clade: Angiosperms
- Clade: Eudicots
- Clade: Rosids
- Order: Malpighiales
- Family: Humiriaceae
- Genus: Hylocarpa; Cuatrec.
- Species: H. heterocarpa

Binomial name
- Hylocarpa heterocarpa (Ducke) Cuatrec.

Synonyms
- Sacoglottis heterocarpa Ducke

Genus of plants

Hylocarpa is a monotypic genus of flowering plants belonging to the family Humiriaceae. The only species is Hylocarpa heterocarpa.

Its native range is Northern Brazil.
