= Humiriastrum melanocarpum =

Conservation status
- Vulnerable (IUCN 3.1)

Scientific classification
- Kingdom: Plantae
- Clade: Tracheophytes
- Clade: Angiosperms
- Clade: Eudicots
- Clade: Rosids
- Order: Malpighiales
- Family: Humiriaceae
- Genus: Humiriastrum
- Species: H. melanocarpum

Binomial name
- Humiriastrum melanocarpum (Cuatrec.) Cuatrec.

Synonyms
- Sacoglottis melanocarpa Cuatrec.

Species of flowering plant

Humiriastrum melanocarpum is a species of plant in the Humiriaceae family. It is a tree endemic to Colombia.
