= Astrothelium megeustomurale =

Scientific classification
- Kingdom: Fungi
- Division: Ascomycota
- Class: Dothideomycetes
- Order: Trypetheliales
- Family: Trypetheliaceae
- Genus: Astrothelium
- Species: A. megeustomurale

Binomial name
- Astrothelium megeustomurale M.Cáceres & Aptroot (2017)

Species of lichen-forming fungus

Astrothelium megeustomurale is a species of corticolous (bark-dwelling) lichen in the family Trypetheliaceae. Found in Brazil, it was formally described as a new species in 2017 by Marcela Eugenia da Silva Cáceres and André Aptroot. The type specimen was collected by the authors along a trail near a field station in the Adolfo Ducke Forest Reserve (Manaus); here it was found growing on tree bark in old-growth rainforest. The lichen has a dull olive-greenish thallus lacking a prothallus, with spherical to pear-shaped ascomata that are either immersed in or on top of the thallus surface, typically arranged in groups of 5 to 15. The pseudostromata (a stroma in which fungal cells and remnants of host tissue are mixed) contain lichexanthone, a secondary chemical. The ascospores number four per ascus, are muriform (divided in regular chambers), and measure 95–120 by 30–33 μm. The species epithet refers to the large ascospores (meg-), the resemblance to A. eustomum (-eusto-), and the muriform ascospores (-murale).

== See also ==
- List of lichens of Brazil
