= Durophagy =

Consumption of hard-shelled or exoskeleton-bearing organisms

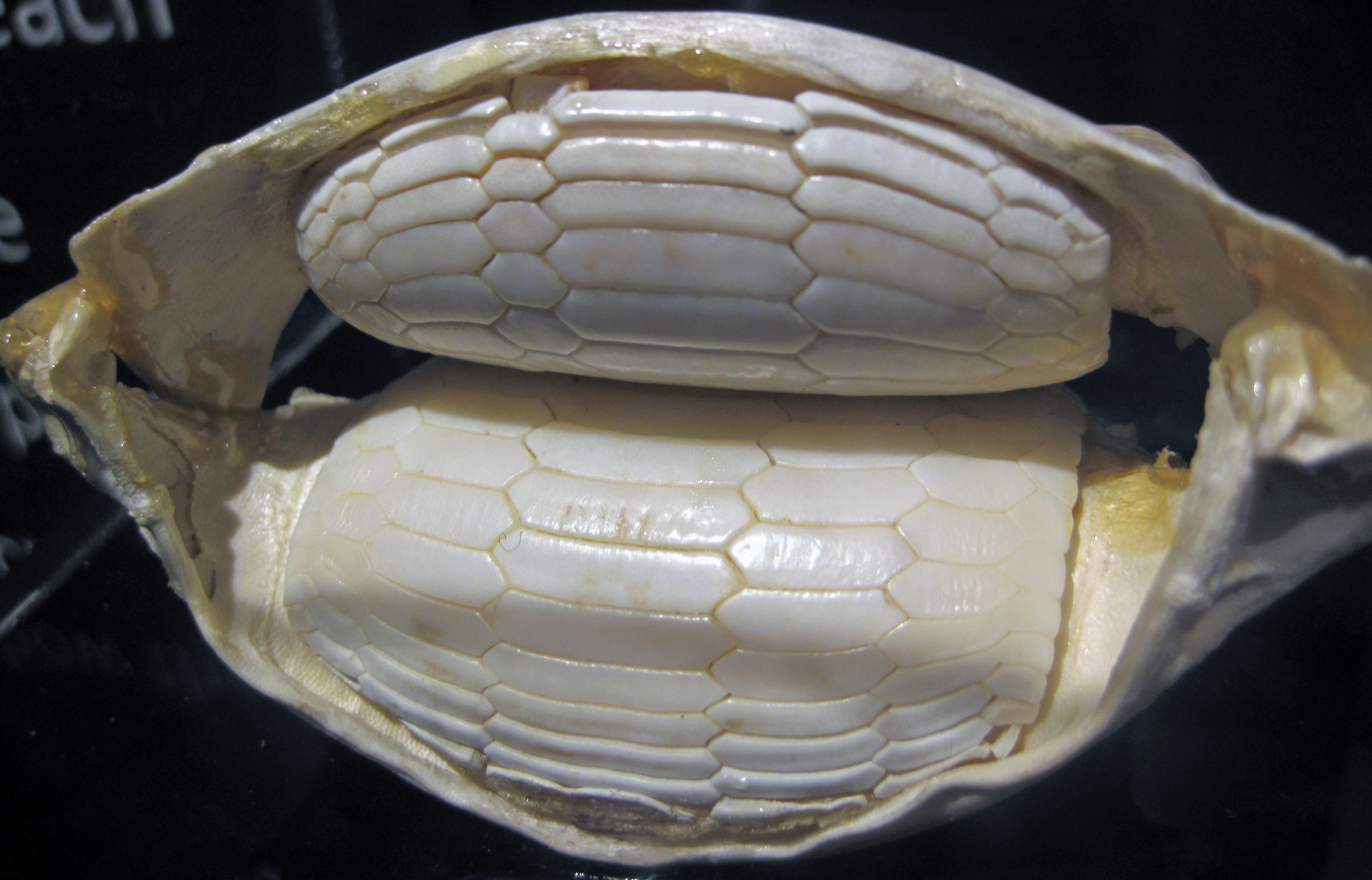
Jaws and teeth of Rhinoptera bonasus (cownose ray)

Durophagy is the eating behavior of animals that consume hard-shelled or exoskeleton-bearing organisms, such as corals, shelled mollusks, or crabs. It is mostly used to describe fish, but is also used when describing reptiles, including fossil turtles, placodonts, some mosasaurs and extinct crocodylians, invertebrates, as well as "bone-crushing" mammalian carnivores such as hyenas. Durophagy requires special adaptions, such as blunt, strong teeth and a heavy jaw. Bite force is necessary to overcome the physical constraints of consuming more durable prey and gain a competitive advantage over other organisms by gaining access to more diverse or exclusive food resources earlier in life. Those with greater bite forces require less time to consume certain prey items as a greater bite force can increase the net rate of energy intake when foraging and enhance fitness in durophagous species.

In the order Carnivora there are two dietary categories of durophagy; bonecrackers and bamboo eaters. Bonecrackers are exemplified by hyenas and borophagines, while bamboo eaters are primarily the giant panda and the red panda. Both have developed similar cranial morphology. However, the mandible morphology reveals more about their dietary resources. Both have a raised and dome-like anterior cranium, enlarged areas for the attachment of masticatory muscles, enlarged premolars, and reinforced tooth enamel. Bamboo eaters tend to have larger mandibles, while bonecrackers have more sophisticated premolars.

== Teleost fish (Teleostei) ==
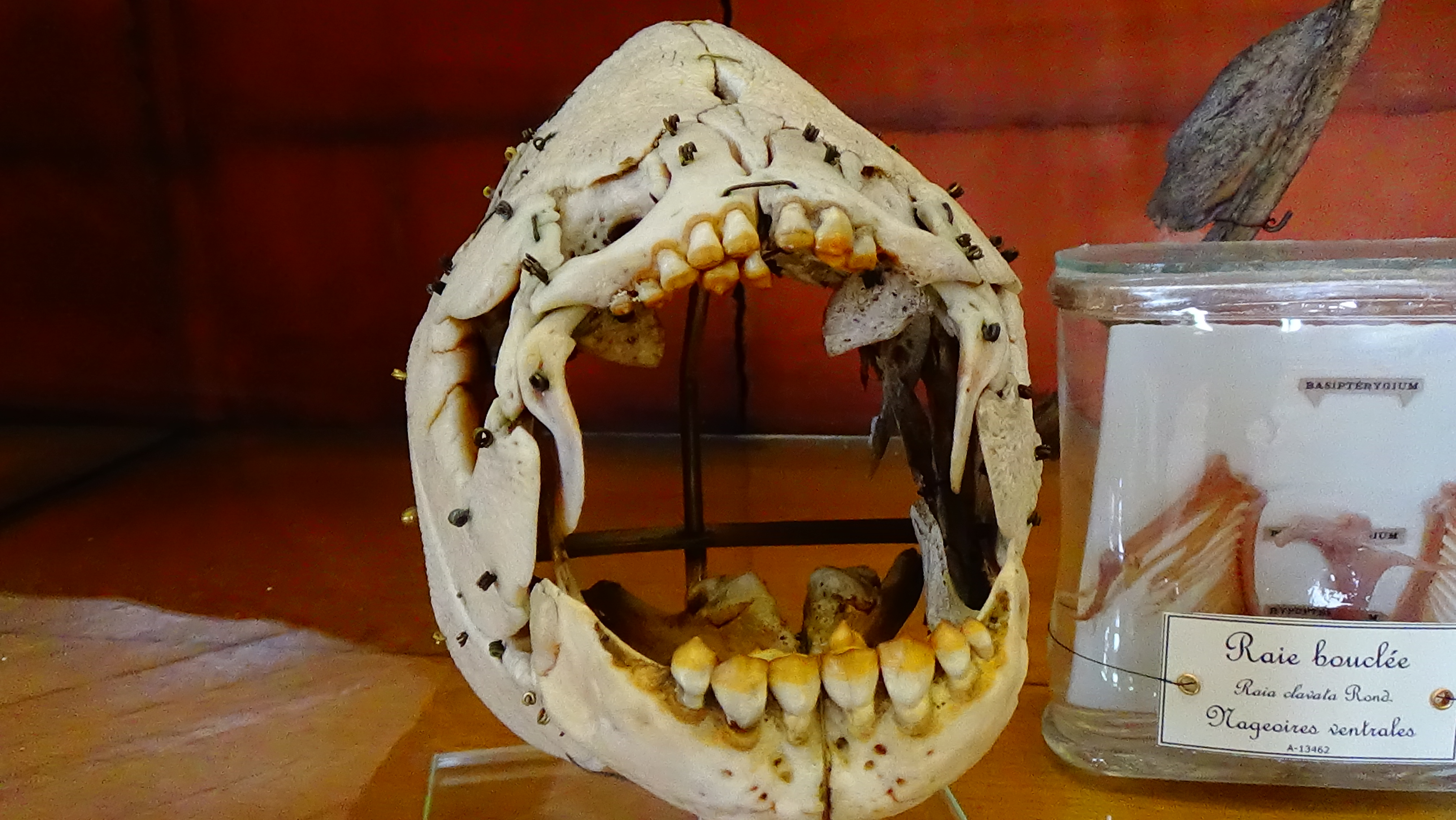
This Piaractus brachypomus skull exhibits the durophagous dentition that enables it to crack hard nut shells, instead of animal prey.

Many Teleosts, for example the Atlantic wolffish, exhibit durophagous behaviour and crush hard prey with their appropriately adapted jaws and teeth. Other fish use of their pharyngeal teeth, with the aid of their protrusible mouth for enabling the grabbing of prey to draw it into their mouth. The pharyngeal jaws found in more derived teleosts are more powerful, with left and right ceratobranchials fusing to become one lower jaw and the pharyngeal branchial fusing to create a large upper jaw that articulates with the neurocranium. They also have developed a muscle, the hypertrophied pharyngeal, to crush prey with help from the molariform pharyngeal teeth. This permits the consumption of hard-shelled prey.

As in the Carnivora however, some largely herbivorous or omnivorous Teleost fishes too, exhibit durophagous behaviour in feeding on plant foods, in that they crack the hard stones of fruit that fall into their water: spectacular examples include relatives of the carnivorous piranhas — such species include Piaractus brachypomus and Piaractus mesopotamicus.

=== Triggerfish (Balistidae) ===
Triggerfish have jaws that contain a row of four teeth on either side, the upper jaw containing an additional set of six plate-like pharyngeal teeth. Triggerfish do not have jaw protrusion and there are enlarged jaw adductor muscles for extra power to crush the protective shells and spines of their prey.

=== Cichlids (Cichlidae) ===
Mollusk shells can be crushed to expose soft parts of the prey to digestive juices or the soft parts can be removed from the shell. Species that crush shells are defined by their large and greatly thickened pharyngeal bones. These bones have flat-crowned teeth and along with their dorsal fellows drawn by powerful muscles, create a crushing mill. The jaws are less derived as they are for just for picking up relatively large objects.

The second method cichlids use is to crush mollusk shells between powerful jaws armed with suitable teeth. Cichlids possess short, broad jaws armed with an outer row of relatively few, strong and conical teeth and several inner rows of finer, also conical teeth. Along with these features are the presence of foreshortening of the skull and development of particularly powerful mandibular adductor muscles. To feed with this type of structure the fish can protrude its mouth ventrally to permit muscles to be seized by the jaws and the mouth then is retracted rapidly so the hard-toothed jaws crush the mollusk shell with the resulting force. A series of biting movements completes the process and the shell fragments are spat out and the soft body is swallowed.

== Chondrichthyans ==
Within the chondrichthyans, horn sharks (Heterodontidae), some rays (Myliobatidae) and chimeras (Holocephali) exhibit durophagous behaviour. They have adaptations to allow for this including stout flattened teeth, hypertrophied jaw adductor muscles and robust jaws to feed on hard prey such as crustaceans and molluscs. Sharks that crush prey have teeth with small, low rounded cusps that are numerous per row, or are molariform. The molariform teeth are smoothly rounded, lack cusps, and there are numerous teeth per row.

=== Horn sharks (Heterodontiformes) ===
Horn sharks have molariform teeth. The anterior teeth are pointed and are used for grasping while the posterior teeth are molariform and are used for crushing. Horn sharks feed primarily on limpets, bivalve molluscs and blue crabs.

=== Bonnethead shark (Sphyrna tiburo) ===
The bonnethead shark Sphyrna tiburo uses ram feeding to capture crab, shrimp and fish which are placed between the molariform teeth where they are crushed. This species also uses suction to transport prey to the esophagus for swallowing. By combining durophagous characteristics with altered kinematic and motor patterns, bonnethead sharks can prey on hard shelled animals. This characteristic distinguishes prey crushing from simply biting, which is a behaviour exhibited by elasmobranchs. While bonnethead sharks feed almost exclusively on crabs, they have the same tooth structure as the Horn sharks (Heterodontiformes).

=== Chimeras (Holocephali) ===
Chimeras (Holocephali) have pavement teeth that are flat, hexagonal in shape and interconnect to form an even dental plate. There is the presence of calcified strengthened cartilaginous jaws, calcified struts within the jaws and a lever 'nutcracker' system that amplifies the force of the jaw adductor muscles. The fusion of the palatoquadrate and mandibular symphysis, a restricted gape and asynchronous activation of the jaw adductors are key elements in the 'nutcracker' model of jaw-crushing ability. Chimeras use their pavement teeth for grinding molluscs, gastropods and crabs.

=== Myliobatidae ===
Myliobatidae are free-swimming rays whose pectoral fins make up broad, powerful "wings" which include the eagle and cow-nose rays. They feed on molluscs and have dentitions adapted to crushing. Dentitions of durophagous myliobatids show several specializations in the jaws and teeth related to their diet. The cartilaginous jaws are strengthened by calcified struts (trabeculae), and the palatoquadrate and mandibular symphysis are fused. Strong ligaments connecting the upper and lower jaws restrict the jaw gape. The strong adductor muscles can be asynchronously activated.

==== Eagle (Aetobatus narinari) and cow-nose (Rhinoptera javanica) rays ====
In eagle (Aetobatus narinari) and cow-nose (Rhinoptera javanica) rays, teeth are hexagonal and are arranged in anteroposterior files packed closely together in an alternating array to form an almost gap-free pavement, similar to the organization found in Chimeras. The teeth are covered with a layer of enameloid. The tooth pavement is stabilized by vertical surfaces that bear ridges and grooves which are interconnected with those on neighboring teeth. These rays also use their pavement teeth for grinding molluscs, gastropods and crabs. Cow nose rays are specialized suction feeders, which open and close their jaws to generate water movements that are used to excavate buried prey. Food capture is achieved by suction and the prey is then cleaned by actions similar to those used in excavation.

==== Myliobatis and Aetobatus ====
In Myliobatis and Aetobatus, anteroposterior ridges of the basal plate extend from the posterior margin of the tooth and these interdigitate with those of the succeeding tooth and also form a shelf on which the body of the neighboring tooth rests. The dentition of the bat ray (Myliobatis californica) is made up of a series of seven files of crushing teeth. The central hexagonal plate is very wide, taking up about half the width of the occlusal surface and it is flanked by three lateral files of smaller teeth on each side, the outermost being pentagonal. The crushing surface formed by the teeth of the upper jaw is more curved than that of the lower jaw.

== Birds ==
Shorebirds commonly consume bivalves and snails which are low in chitin but the calcium carbonate shell makes up a large portion of their weight. Bivalves and snails are largely consumed whole by ducks and wading birds. The molluscivores that swallow snails or bivalves whole have large well-modularized gizzards for crushing the strong shells. The gizzard of red-necked stints and red knots is more than ten times larger than the proventriculus. The size of the gizzard is adaptable in these shore birds, becoming atrophied when soft food items like worms are consumed and increasing in size and muscularity following prolonged consumption of snails, cockles or mussels. The production of chitinase for the hydrolysis of chitin is important for birds that consume mollusks.

== Mammals ==
=== Marine mammals ===
==== Sea otters (Enhydra lutris) ====
Sea otters preferentially forage on benthic invertebrates, particularly sea urchins, gastropod, bivalve mollusks, and crustaceans. Once prey is caught, the otters use their powerful jaws and sharp teeth to consume their meal quickly, even protective crustacean shells. They have canines that deliver a lethal bite, and molars that can crush bones and the shells of mollusks.

Sea otter molars are broad, flat, multi cuspid teeth and the carnassial are also modified for crushing. Both the temporalis and masseter muscles are well developed, creating a strong bite force. The teeth are extremely broad and carnassial are highly molarized. Captured prey is manipulated with the forepaws or is held temporarily in loose skin pouches in the armpits. For larger, heavier-shelled prey, otters will sometimes exhibit tool-use behavior, breaking open sea urchins and mussels with a false stone used as an anvil. Sea otters can also bite sea urchins and mussels open using their strong jaws and teeth. Adults can crush most of their food items but youngsters have not yet developed powerful enough jaws. Therefore, young otters require the assistance of a tool or stone. Tools may also be used when the molluscs are too large to be crushed in the jaws.

=== Monkeys ===
All mangabeys appear to be durophagous and possess relatively thick molar enamel and expanded premolars, dental adaptations for processing hard foods. Their diet consists of Sacoglottis gabonensis seeds. These seeds can remain on the ground for months without rotting. With hard-object feeding, Mangabeys needed selection to favour thick molar enamel and flattened molars for crushing seeds.

=== Giant panda ===
The giant panda is mainly a herbivore despite its short, relatively unspecialized digestive tract that is characteristic of carnivores. Giant pandas lack microbial digestion in their rumen or caecum that is typical of most herbivores for breaking down cellulose and lignin in plant cell walls. Therefore, Giant Pandas need to get their nutrients from the cell contents and fraction of hemicellulose they can break down. The panda subsists mainly on bamboo and does so with modifications of their jaws. Pandas show elaboration of the crushing features of the dentition. The molars are broad, flat, multi cuspid teeth and are the main grinding surface. Jaw action is not a simple crushing one but rather a definite sideways grinding. Panda jaws have a large zygomatico-mandibularis muscle, which is responsible for the sideways movement of the jaw. The glenoid is very deep, preventing back and forth movement of the jaw.

Bamboo represents a predictable food source which is seasonally abundant. Pandas are able to subsist on it despite its low nutritive content. Pandas do this by moving large quantities through the digestive tract in a short period of time. They also reduce their energy expenditures by resting and only remaining active to feed, and they don't have a hibernation period, allowing them to have more foraging time. They chose security over uncertainty, indicated by their bamboo eating adaptations.

=== Hyaenids ===
Bone-crushing eating habits appear to be associated with stronger teeth, as seen is in hyaenids. This is because bone-crushing requires greater bite strength and increases the risk of canine breakage. In hyaenids, the carnassial are slightly less specialized as cutting blades than those of the Felidae. The bone-crushing adaptations relate mainly to the premolars. The anterior and posterior cusps are reduced and the central cusp enlarged and widened, so that the tooth is converted from a blade-like structure to a heavy conical hammer. Strong muscles are also required for bone crushing, and the temporalis attachment on the skull is enlarged by a strong sagittal crest. Heavy, hammer-like teeth and extremely strong jaws and jaw muscles make it possible for hyaenas to crack larger bone than other carnivores are capable of, and their highly efficient cutting carnassials can deal with tough hides and tendons.

=== Wolverine (Gulo gulo) ===
The wolverine has jaws and teeth that are extremely powerful and together with its scavenging habits, have earned the wolverine the name "hyena of the north". The wolverine is an effective scavenger, capable of cracking heavy bones and shows the same adaptations in the jaw as the hyenas do. The sagittal crest projects well above the area of attachment of the neck muscles, and in a large animal it extends back far behind the level of the condyles to provide attachments for the relatively enormous temporalis muscles, creating a powerful bite force.

== See also ==
- List of feeding behaviours
