= Sternarchogiton zuanoni =

Conservation status
- Vulnerable (IUCN 3.1)

Scientific classification
- Kingdom: Animalia
- Phylum: Chordata
- Class: Actinopterygii
- Order: Gymnotiformes
- Family: Apteronotidae
- Genus: Sternarchogiton
- Species: S. zuanoni

Binomial name
- Sternarchogiton zuanoni de Santana & Vari, 2010

Species of fish

Sternarchogiton zuanoni is a species of weakly electric, freshwater ray-finned fish belonging to the family Apteronotidae, the ghost knifefishes. This species is known only from a single locality in Brazil.

== Taxonomy ==
Sternarchogiton zuanoni was first formally described in 2010 by the Bazilian ichthyologist Carlos David de Santana and the American ichthyologist Richard P. Vari with its type locality given as the Rio Xingu, Município de Altamira, Cachoeira de Kaituká at 3°12'S, 52°12'W in Pará. The genus Sternarchogiton is classified within the subfamily Aperonotinae of the family Aperonotidae, the ghost kinfefishes.

== Etymology ==
Sternarchogiton zuanoni is classified in the genus Sternarchogiton, a name which combines Sternarus, a synonym of Apteronotus, with geiton, which means neighbour. Sternarus was the genus that the type species of Sternarchogiton, S. nattereri was originally placed in, thus the name means "neighbour of Sternarnus". The specific name honours the Brazilian ichthyologist Jansen Alfredo Sampaio Zuanon of the Instituto Nacional de Pesquisas da Amazônia in Manaus in recognition to his contribution to the study of the Amazonian fish fauna and who also assisted in the collection of the holotype of this species.

== Distribution and habitat ==
Sternarchogiton zuanoniis known only from its type locality on the Rio Xingu near Altamira in Pará, Brazil. The type series was collected from rapids pools at the bases of waterfalls. It is the only species in its genus which is found on rocky substrates in switly flowing streams.

== Conservation status ==
Sternarchogiton zuanoni is known only from its type locality which is within the area affected by the development of the Belo Monte Hydroelectric Power Plant and it is known from a total area of 4 km (2.49 mi) so the International Union for Conservation of Nature have assessed its status a Vulnerable but state that the construction of the hydro eoe=lectricproject could change that status to Critically endangered or extinct.
