= Gymnetis merops =

- Gymnetis merops

Scientific classification
- Kingdom: Animalia
- Phylum: Arthropoda
- Clade: Pancrustacea
- Class: Insecta
- Order: Coleoptera
- Suborder: Polyphaga
- Infraorder: Scarabaeiformia
- Family: Scarabaeidae
- Genus: Gymnetis
- Species: G. merops

Binomial name
- Gymnetis merops Ratcliffe, 2018

Species of beetle

Gymnetis merops is a species of scarab beetle in the family Scarabaeidae.

== Distribution & Habitat ==
It is found in multiple provinces of Peru, and its habitat is mostly in the dry forests of the area.
