= Terminalia parvifolia subsp. rabelloana =

Conservation status
- Endangered (IUCN 2.3)

Scientific classification
- Kingdom: Plantae
- Clade: Tracheophytes
- Clade: Angiosperms
- Clade: Eudicots
- Clade: Rosids
- Order: Myrtales
- Family: Combretaceae
- Genus: Terminalia
- Species: T. parvifolia
- Subspecies: T. p. subsp. rabelloana

Trinomial name
- Terminalia parvifolia subsp. rabelloana (Mattos) Gere & Boatwr.

Synonyms
- Buchenavia parvifolia subsp. rabelloana (Mattos) Alwan & Stace; Buchenavia rabelloana Mattos

Species of flowering plant

Buchenavia rabelloana is a subspecies of flowering plant in the Combretaceae family. It is a tree endemic to São Paulo state in southeastern Brazil. It is threatened by habitat loss.

The plant was first described as species Buchenavia rabelloana by Joáo Rodrigues de Mattos in 1967. In 2010 Abdul-Ridha Akber Alwan Al-Mayah and Clive Anthony Stace described it as a subspecies of Buchenavia parvifolia. In 2017 Jephris Gere and James Stephen Boatwright merged genus Buchenavia into genus Terminalia and renamed the subspecies T. parvifolia subsp. rabelloana.
