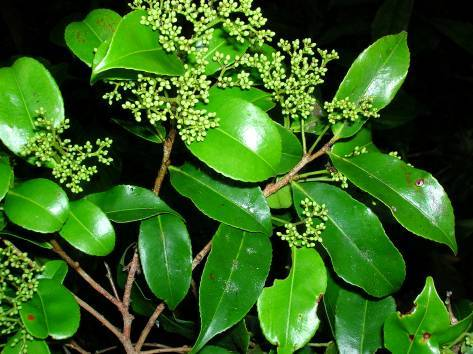
- Humiriastrum diguense
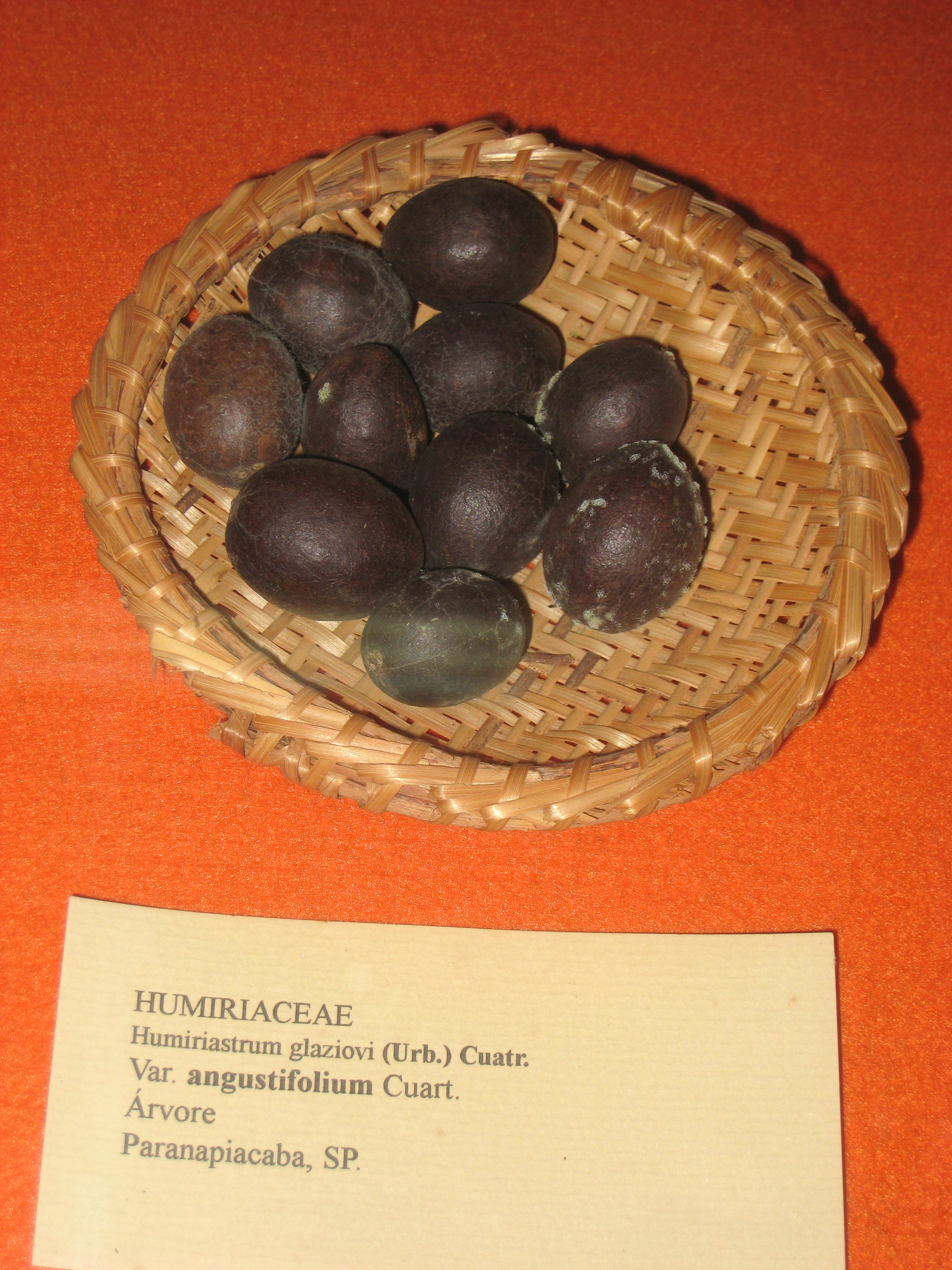
- Humiriastrum glaziovii fruits

Scientific classification
- Kingdom: Plantae
- Clade: Tracheophytes
- Clade: Angiosperms
- Clade: Eudicots
- Clade: Rosids
- Order: Malpighiales
- Family: Humiriaceae
- Genus: Humiriastrum (Urb.) Cuatrec.

= Humiriastrum =

Humiriastrum Temporal range: Miocene - recent

Genus of flowering plants

Humiriastrum is a genus of flowering plants in the family Humiriaceae. There are about 16 species distributed in Central and South America.

== Species ==
16 species are accepted.

- Humiriastrum colombianum (Cuatrec.) Cuatrec.
- Humiriastrum cuspidatum
- Humiriastrum dentatum
- Humiriastrum diguense (Cuatrec.) Cuatrec.
- Humiriastrum excelsum
- Humiriastrum glaziovii
- Humiriastrum mapiriense Cuatrec.
- Humiriastrum melanocarpum (Cuatrec.) Cuatrec.
- Humiriastrum mussunungense Cuatrec.
- Humiriastrum obovatum (Benth.) Cuatrec.
- Humiriastrum ottohuberi Cuatrec.
- Humiriastrum piraparanense Cuatrec.
- Humiriastrum procerum (Little) Cuatrec.
- Humiriastrum purusensis Prance
- Humiriastrum subcrenatum (Benth.) Cuatrec.
- Humiriastrum villosum (Fróes) Cuatrec.
