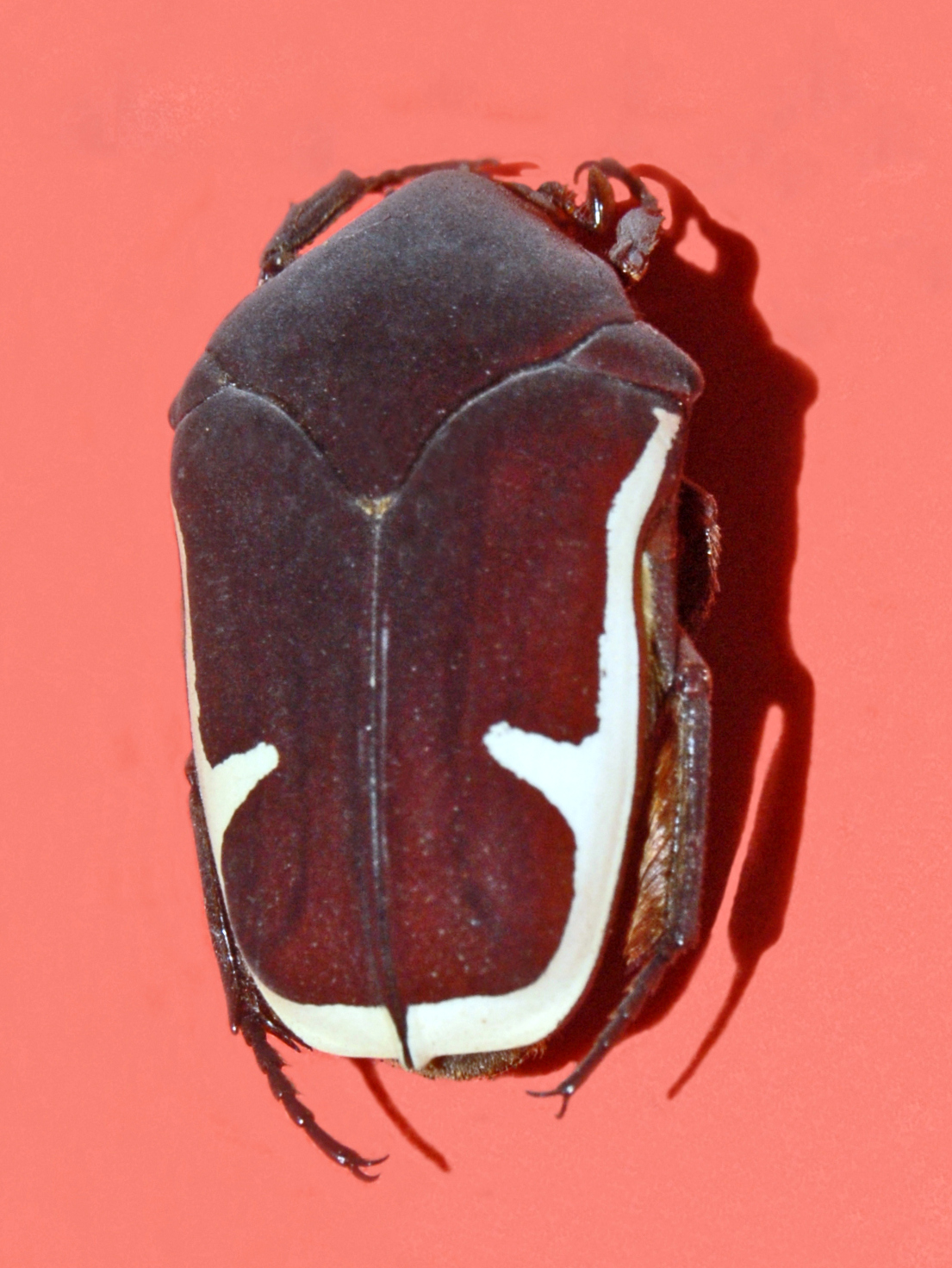
- Museum specimen of Gymnetis holosericea

Scientific classification
- Kingdom: Animalia
- Phylum: Arthropoda
- Clade: Pancrustacea
- Class: Insecta
- Order: Coleoptera
- Suborder: Polyphaga
- Infraorder: Scarabaeiformia
- Family: Scarabaeidae
- Genus: Gymnetis
- Species: G. holosericea

Binomial name
- Gymnetis holosericea (Olivier, 1789)

Synonyms
- Scarabaeus holosericeus Voet, 1779 (Unav.); Cetonia holosericea Olivier, 1789; Cetonia circumdata Schönherr, 1817; Gymnetis xanthospila Schaum, 1844; Gymnetis sexmaculata Blanchard, 1850; Gymnetis mathani Pouillaude, 1913; Gymnetis olivina Pouillaude, 1913

= Gymnetis holosericea =

Species of beetle

Gymnetis holosericea is a species of beetles of the family Scarabaeidae and subfamily Cetoniinae.

== Subspecies ==
- Gymnetis holosericea aureotorquata Bourgoin, 1912
- Gymnetis holosericea chanchamayensis Pouillaude, 1913
- Gymnetis holosericea distincta Pouillaude, 1913
- Gymnetis holosericea flava (Weber, 1801)
- Gymnetis holosericea holosericea (Olivier, 1789)
- Gymnetis holosericea magnifica Gory & Percheron, 1833

== Description ==
Gymnetis holosericea can reach a body length of about 30–40 millimetres (1.2–1.6 in). The third instar larvae reach a length of about 20–30 millimetres (0.79–1.18 in), while pupa has a length of 20–25 millimetres (0.79–0.98 in). Variability of this species is quite large. The basic color is usually black or dark brown, with yellow or whitish markings on the elytra.

== Distribution ==
This species can be found in Brazil, Ecuador, Bolivia, Colombia and French Guiana.
