= Schistostemon =

Scientific classification
- Kingdom: Plantae
- Clade: Tracheophytes
- Clade: Angiosperms
- Clade: Eudicots
- Clade: Rosids
- Order: Malpighiales
- Family: Humiriaceae
- Genus: Schistostemon (Urb.) Cuatrec.

Genus of plants

Schistostemon is a genus of flowering plants belonging to the family Humiriaceae.

Its native range is Southern Tropical America.

Species:

- Schistostemon auyantepuiensis Cuatrec.
- Schistostemon densiflorus (Benth.) Cuatrec.
- Schistostemon dichotomus (Urb.) Cuatrec.
- Schistostemon fernandezii Cuatrec.
- Schistostemon macrophyllus (Benth.) Cuatrec.
- Schistostemon oblongifolius (Benth.) Cuatrec.
- Schistostemon reticulatus (Ducke) Cuatrec.
- Schistostemon retusus (Ducke) Cuatrec.
- Schistostemon sylvaticus D.Sabatier
