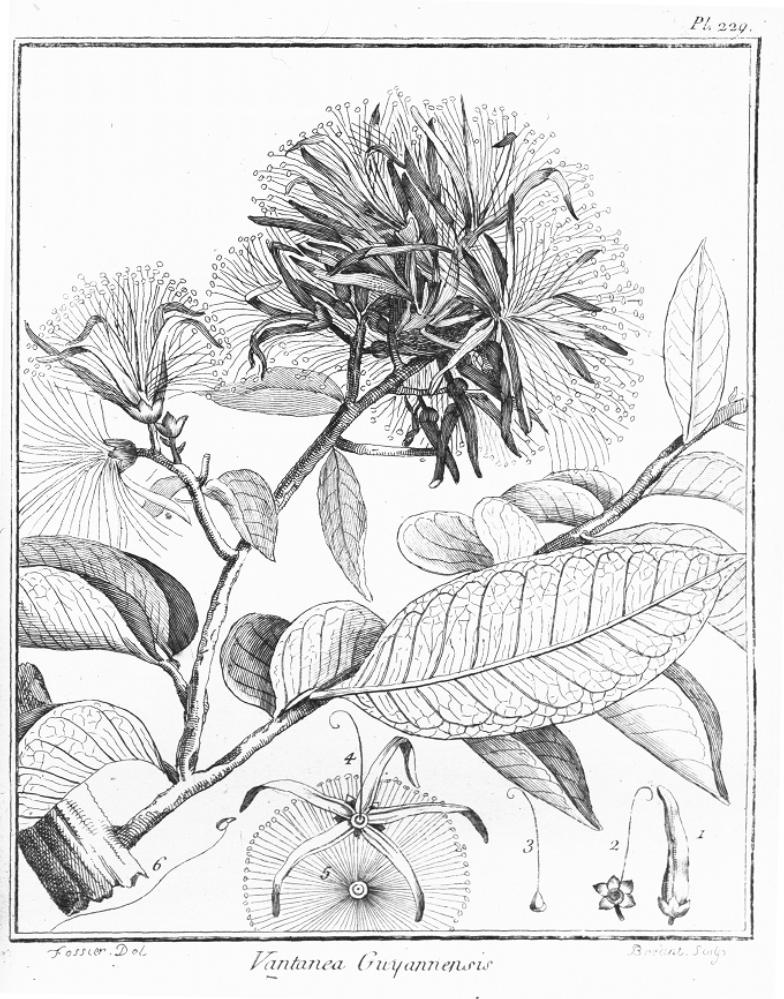
- Vantanea guianensis

Scientific classification
- Kingdom: Plantae
- Clade: Tracheophytes
- Clade: Angiosperms
- Clade: Eudicots
- Clade: Rosids
- Order: Malpighiales
- Family: Humiriaceae
- Genus: Vantanea; Aubl.

= Vantanea =

Vantanea Temporal range: Eocene - recent

Genus of flowering plants

Vantanea is a genus of flowering plants in the family Humiriaceae.

Species include:

- Vantanea celativenia
- Vantanea compacta
- Vantanea depleta McPherson
- Vantanea guianensis
- Vantanea magdalenensis Cuatrec.
- Vantanea minor
- Vantanea obovata
- Vantanea occidentalis
- Vantanea parviflora
- Vantanea peruviana J.F. Macbr.
- Vantanea spichigeri A.H. Gentry
