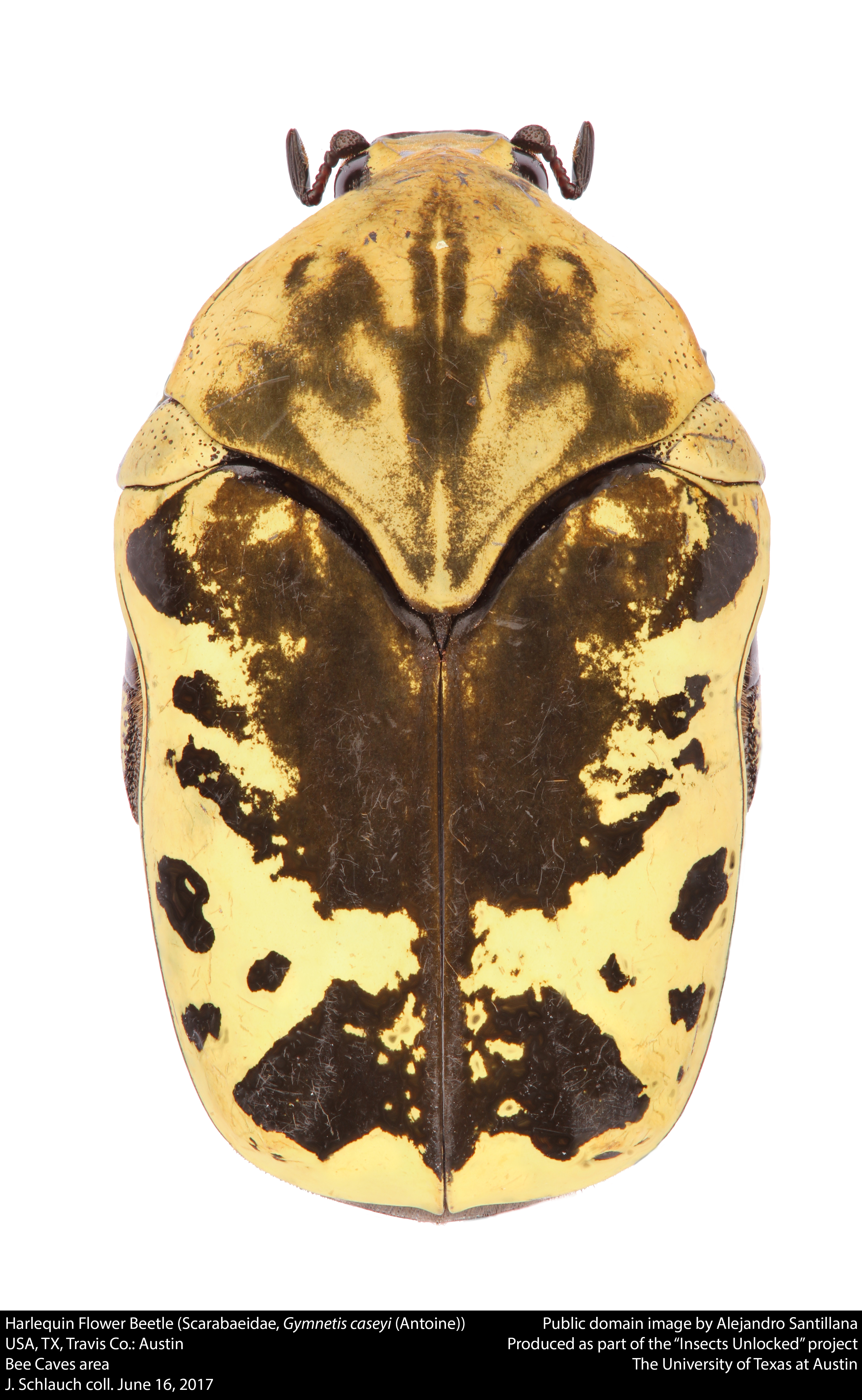

Scientific classification
- Kingdom: Animalia
- Phylum: Arthropoda
- Clade: Pancrustacea
- Class: Insecta
- Order: Coleoptera
- Suborder: Polyphaga
- Infraorder: Scarabaeiformia
- Family: Scarabaeidae
- Genus: Gymnetis
- Species: G. thula

Binomial name
- Gymnetis thula Ratcliffe, 2018

Synonyms
- Gymnetis caseyi Antoine, 2001 (Nomen nudum)

= Gymnetis thula =

Species of beetle

Gymnetis thula, the harlequin flower beetle, is a species of scarab beetle in the family Scarabaeidae.
