= Gymnetis amazona =

Scientific classification
- Kingdom: Animalia
- Phylum: Arthropoda
- Clade: Pancrustacea
- Class: Insecta
- Order: Coleoptera
- Suborder: Polyphaga
- Infraorder: Scarabaeiformia
- Family: Scarabaeidae
- Genus: Gymnetis
- Species: G. amazona

Binomial name
- Gymnetis amazona Ratcliffe, 2018

Species of beetle

Gymnetis amazona is a species of scarab beetle in the family Scarabaeidae.
