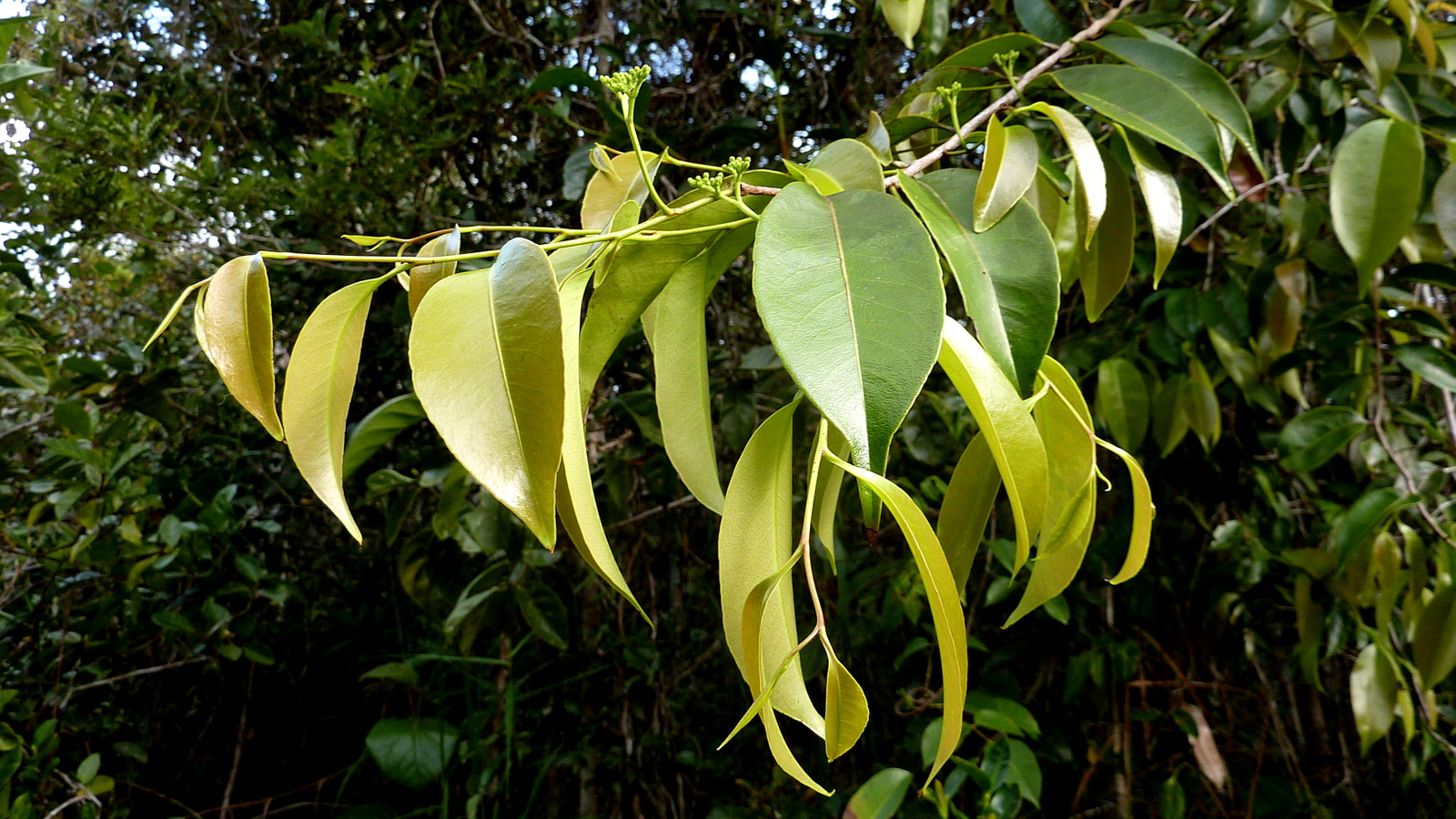
- Sacoglottis mattogrossensis

Scientific classification
- Kingdom: Plantae
- Clade: Tracheophytes
- Clade: Angiosperms
- Clade: Eudicots
- Clade: Rosids
- Order: Malpighiales
- Family: Humiriaceae
- Genus: Sacoglottis; Mart.

Synonyms
- Aubrya Baill.

= Sacoglottis =

Sacoglottis Temporal range: Oligocene - recent

Genus of trees

Sacoglottis is a genus of plant in family Humiriaceae. It includes several species of trees, native to tropical Central and South America and western and central Africa.

== Species ==
11 species are accepted.

- Sacoglottis amazonica Mart.
- Sacoglottis ceratocarpa Ducke
- Sacoglottis cydonioides Cuatrec.
- Sacoglottis gabonensis (Baill.) Urb.
- Sacoglottis guianensis Benth.
- Sacoglottis holridgei Cuatrec.
- Sacoglottis maguirei Cuatrec.
- Sacoglottis mattogrossensis Malme
- Sacoglottis ovicarpa Cuatrec.
- Sacoglottis perryi K.Wurdack & Zartman
- Sacoglottis trichogyna Cuatrec.
