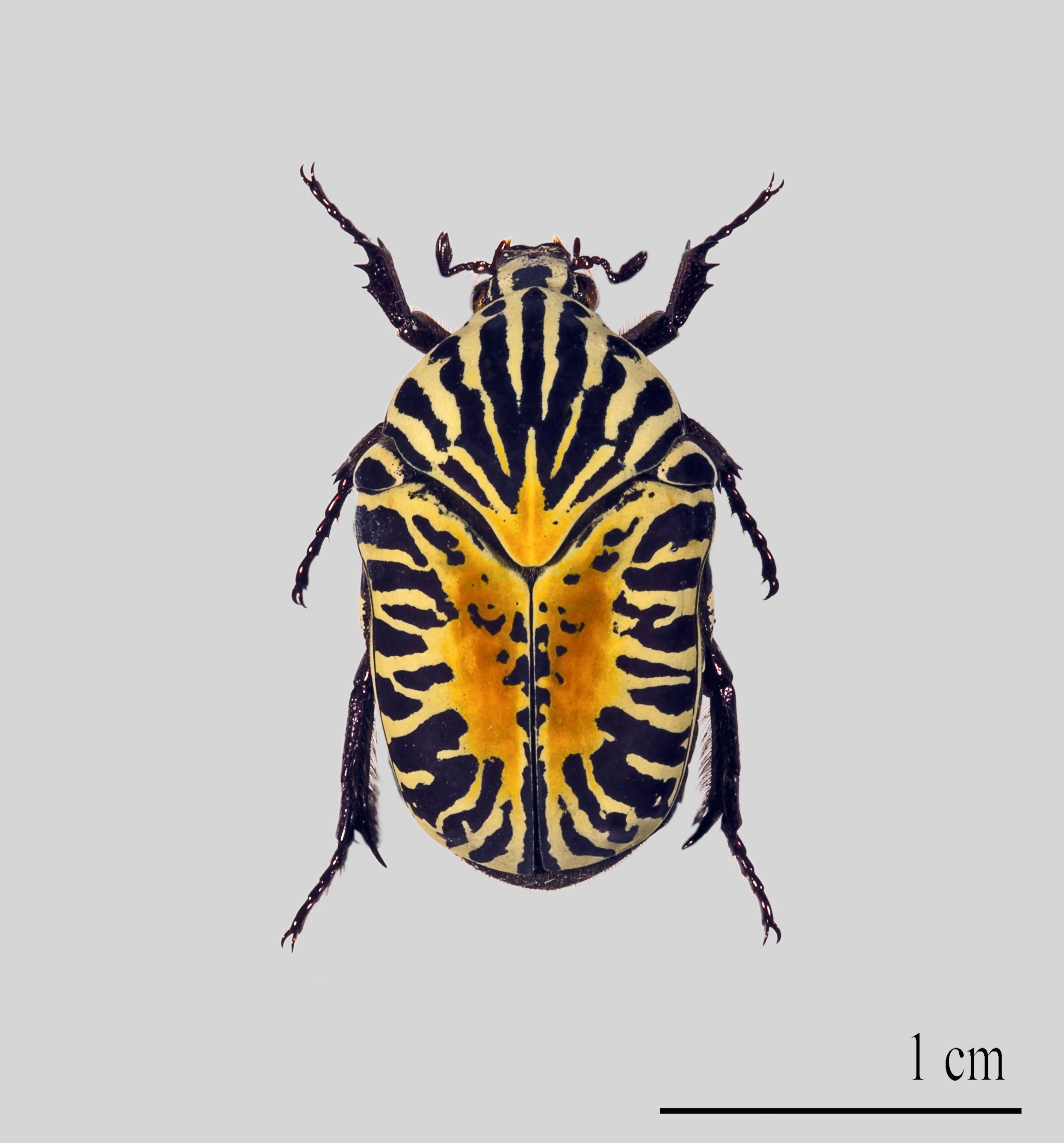

Scientific classification
- Kingdom: Animalia
- Phylum: Arthropoda
- Clade: Pancrustacea
- Class: Insecta
- Order: Coleoptera
- Suborder: Polyphaga
- Infraorder: Scarabaeiformia
- Family: Scarabaeidae
- Genus: Gymnetis
- Species: G. stellata

Binomial name
- Gymnetis stellata (Latreille, 1833)

= Gymnetis stellata =

Species of beetle

Gymnetis stellata is a Mexican species of Gymnetis. It is approximately 2 centimetres (0.79 in) long.
