= Duckeanthus =

Conservation status
- Data Deficient (IUCN 3.1)

Scientific classification
- Kingdom: Plantae
- Clade: Tracheophytes
- Clade: Angiosperms
- Clade: Magnoliids
- Order: Magnoliales
- Family: Annonaceae
- Genus: Duckeanthus; R.E.Fr.
- Species: D. grandiflorus

Binomial name
- Duckeanthus grandiflorus R.E.Fr.

Genus of plant in the soursop family

Duckeanthus is a genus of plant in the family Annonaceae. It is native to Brazil. It contains a single species, Duckeanthus grandiflorus. Robert Elias Fries, the Swedish botanist who first formally described it, named it in honor of Adolpho Ducke who collected the specimen he examined, and its large (grandis in Latin) flowers.

== Description ==
It is a small tree. Its mature branches are smooth. Its internodes 3–5 centimeters (1.2–2.0 in) long. Its hairless petioles are 5–7 millimeters long and 3 millimeters thick and have a deep groove on their upper surfaces. Its papery, elliptical leaves are 19–23 centimeters (7.5–9.1 in) by 7.5–10.5 centimeters (3.0–4.1 in). The leaves have bright green hairless upper surfaces and yellow-green hairless lower surfaces. The tips of the leaves come to an abrupt tapering point about 2 centimeters long. Its leaves have about 10 secondary veins emanating from either side of their midribs. The secondary veins arch toward the leaf tip and join one another 4–6 millimeters before reaching the margin of the leaf. Its inflorescences have 1–2 flowers and are emerge from extra-axillary positions. Its white flowers are on 2 centimeter long, erect, hairless, warty pedicels. The pedicels have a 2 millimeter long bract at their base and about halfway up their length. Its round to triangular sepals are 15 by 15 millimeters and come to a point at their tip. The sepals are hairless on both sides, but are often warty. It has 6 fleshy petals in two rows of 3. Its outer petals are 3 by 2 centimeters, have silky hairs on their inner surfaces, and come to a shallow point at their tip. Its rhomboidal to oval inner petals are 4.5–5 by 2.5–3 centimeters and covered in sparse hairs. Its 2.5-3 millimeter long stamens form an androecium 1.5 centimeters in diameter. The connective tissue between the lobes of anthers is overgrown to form a flat cap covered in short hairs. Its narrow, oval ovaries are 1.5 millimeters long and covered in rust-colored hairs. Its bristly stigmas are 1.5 millimeters long.

=== Reproductive biology ===
The orange pollen of D. grandiflorus is shed as permanent tetrads.

=== Habitat and distribution ===
It has been observed growing in wet forest habitats.
