= Duckesia =

Duckesia Temporal range: Oligocene - recent

Scientific classification
- Kingdom: Plantae
- Clade: Tracheophytes
- Clade: Angiosperms
- Clade: Eudicots
- Clade: Rosids
- Order: Malpighiales
- Family: Humiriaceae
- Genus: Duckesia; Cuatrec.

Genus of plants

Duckesia is a genus of flowering plants belonging to the family Humiriaceae.

Its native range is Venezuela, Brazil and Peru.

The genus name of Duckesia is in honour of Adolpho Ducke (1876–1959), an entomologist, botanist and ethnographer specializing in Amazonia. It was first published and described in Contr. U.S. Natl. Herb. Vol.35 on page 76 in 1961.

Known species:

- Duckesia liesneri (Cuatrec.) K.Wurdack & Zartman
- Duckesia verrucosa (Ducke) Cuatrec.
