= Gymnetis aurantivittae =

Scientific classification
- Kingdom: Animalia
- Phylum: Arthropoda
- Clade: Pancrustacea
- Class: Insecta
- Order: Coleoptera
- Suborder: Polyphaga
- Infraorder: Scarabaeiformia
- Family: Scarabaeidae
- Genus: Gymnetis
- Species: G. aurantivittae

Binomial name
- Gymnetis aurantivittae Ratcliffe, 2018

Species of beetle

Gymnetis aurantivittae is a species of scarab beetle in the family Scarabaeidae.
