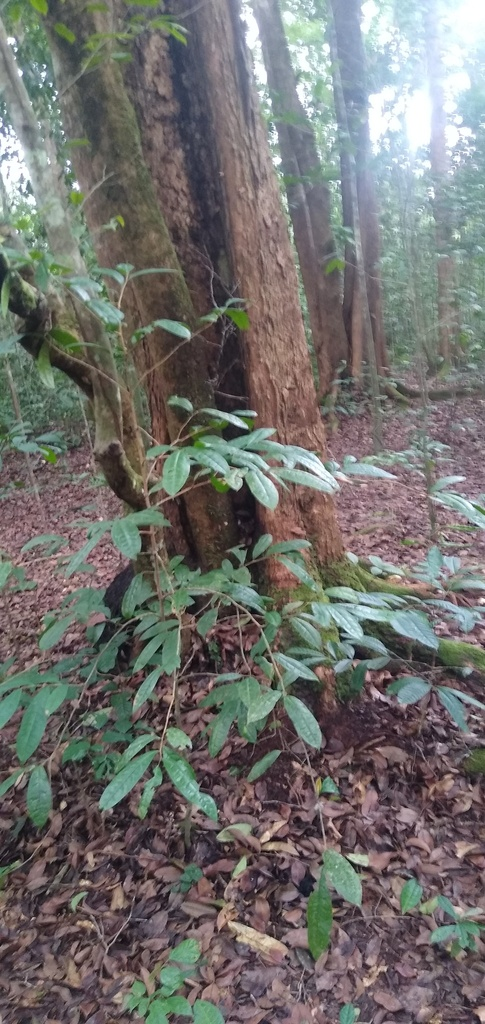

Scientific classification
- Kingdom: Plantae
- Clade: Tracheophytes
- Clade: Angiosperms
- Clade: Eudicots
- Clade: Rosids
- Order: Malpighiales
- Family: Humiriaceae
- Genus: Sacoglottis
- Species: S. gabonensis

Binomial name
- Sacoglottis gabonensis (Baill.) Urb.

Synonyms
- Aubrya gabonensis Baill.; Houmiri gabonensis Baill.

= Sacoglottis gabonensis =

Species of tree

Sacoglottis gabonensis, commonly known as bitterbark tree or cherry mahogany is a medium to large sized evergreen tree within the Humiriaceae family. It is the only species within the genus that is native to tropical Africa. It occurs in rainforests or on sandy soils of Senegal eastwards to Angola in central Africa. It is traded locally and known in some countries under the name Ozouga.

== Description ==
A large species that can reach 40 metres (130 ft) tall and a diameter of 1.8 m (6 ft) at maturity, it has a scaly dark brown bark with pustulate lenticels and a red-brown slash, its trunk is crooked but occasionally straight while the base is irregular, with wide spreading buttressed roots or deeply fluted surface roots. Leaves are simple, alternate and distichous in arrangement, with a coriaceous surface that is dull green in color; stipules up to 1 mm long, petiole is 6 to 10 mm (0.2 to 0.4 in) long; leaf-blade is narrowly ovate, elliptic or oblong in outline, 6 to 15 cm (2.4 to 5.9 in) long and 2.5 to 6 cm (1.0 to 2.4 in) wide. Inflorescence is axillary cymes, bracts are 1 to 2 mm (0.0 to 0.1 in) long, pedicel is 0.5 to 1.5 mm (0.02 to 0.06 in) long. Fruit is an ellipsoid drupe, greenish to yellow when ripe, 1-5 seeded.

== Chemistry ==
The chemical compound Bergenin has been isolated from the stem bark of Sacoglottis gabonensis.

== Uses ==
Stem bark extracts is used as a palm wine additive for the preservation and potency of the alcoholic drink, while fruits of the species are favored by the African bush elephants at the Lope National Park. Some monkeys are also adapted to eat their hard seeds. Its wood is used in local marine related works such as canoe and boat making and bridge construction. It is also a good source of firewood.
