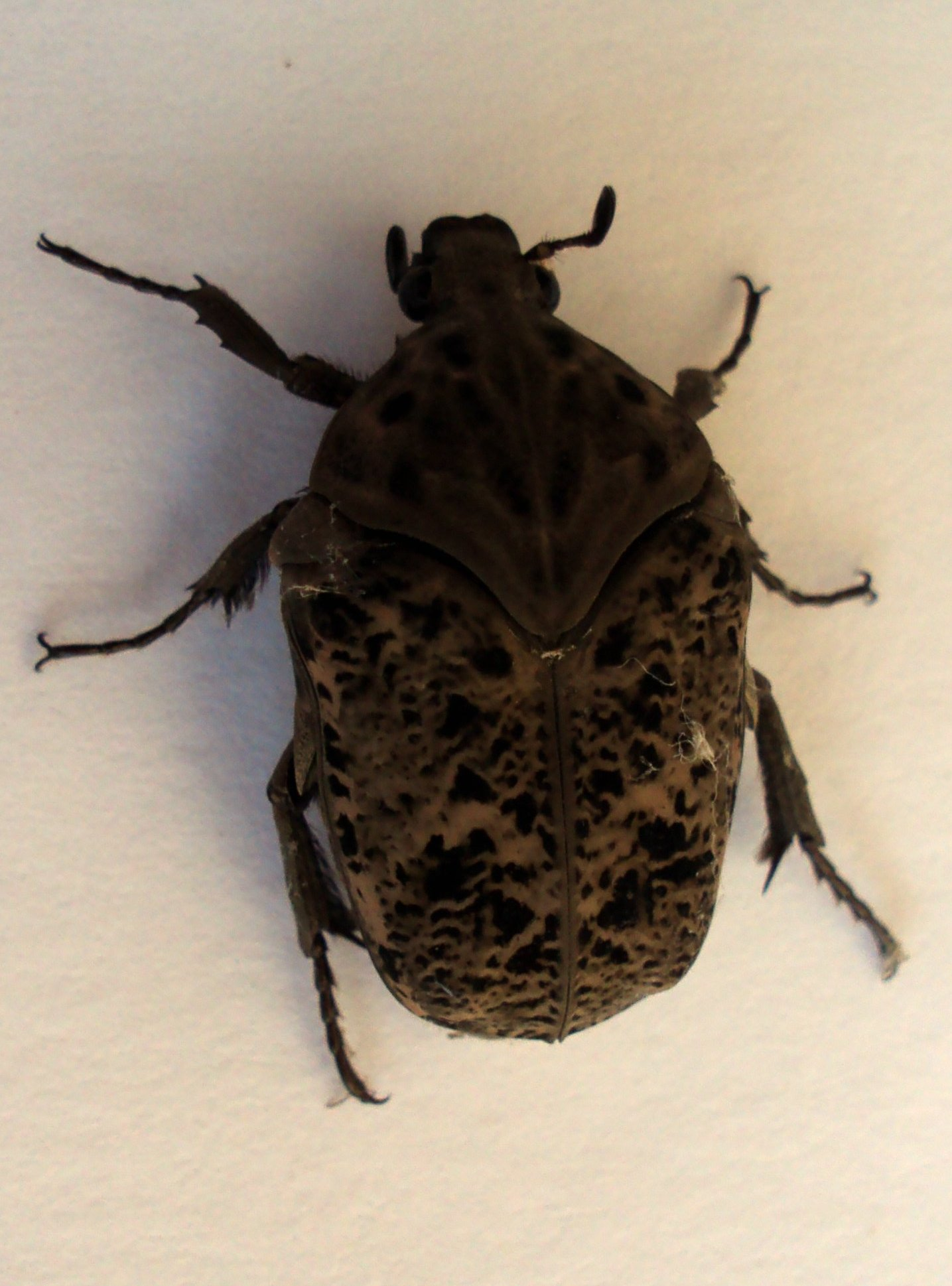

Scientific classification
- Kingdom: Animalia
- Phylum: Arthropoda
- Clade: Pancrustacea
- Class: Insecta
- Order: Coleoptera
- Suborder: Polyphaga
- Infraorder: Scarabaeiformia
- Family: Scarabaeidae
- Genus: Gymnetis
- Species: G. litigiosa

Binomial name
- Gymnetis litigiosa Gory & Percheron, 1833

= Gymnetis litigiosa =

Species of beetle

Gymnetis litigiosa is a species of beetle in the family Scarabaeidae.
