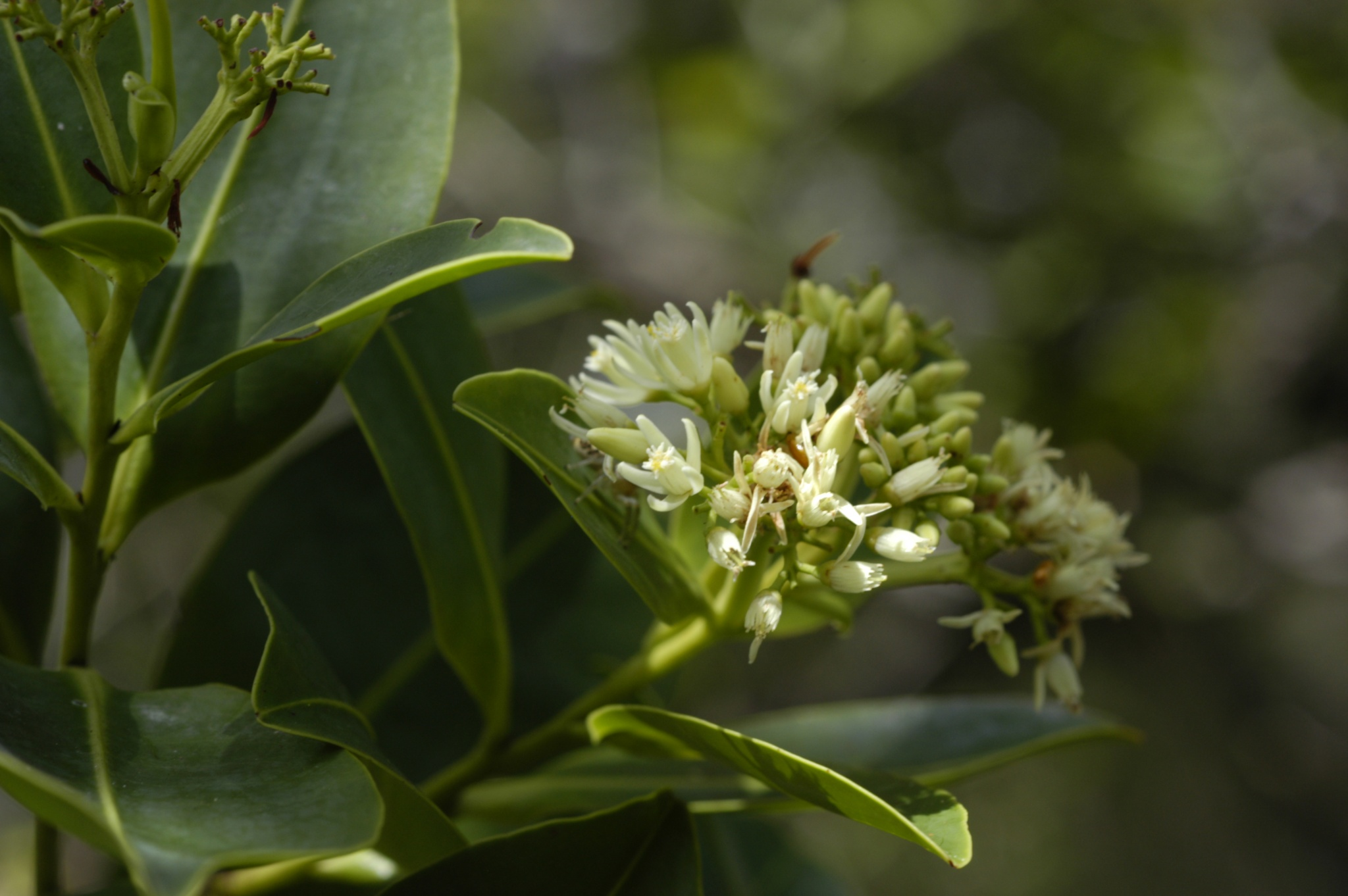
- H. balsamifera

Scientific classification
- Kingdom: Plantae
- Clade: Tracheophytes
- Clade: Angiosperms
- Clade: Eudicots
- Clade: Rosids
- Order: Malpighiales
- Family: Humiriaceae
- Genus: Humiria; J.St.-Hil.

= Humiria =

Humiria Temporal range: Miocene - recent

Genus of flowering plants

Humiria is a genus of flowering plants in the family Humiriaceae found in lowland forests of South America.

Species include:

- Humiria balsamifera Aubl.
- Humiria crassifolia Mart.
- Humiria fruticosa Cuatrec.
- Humiria wurdackii Cuatrec.
