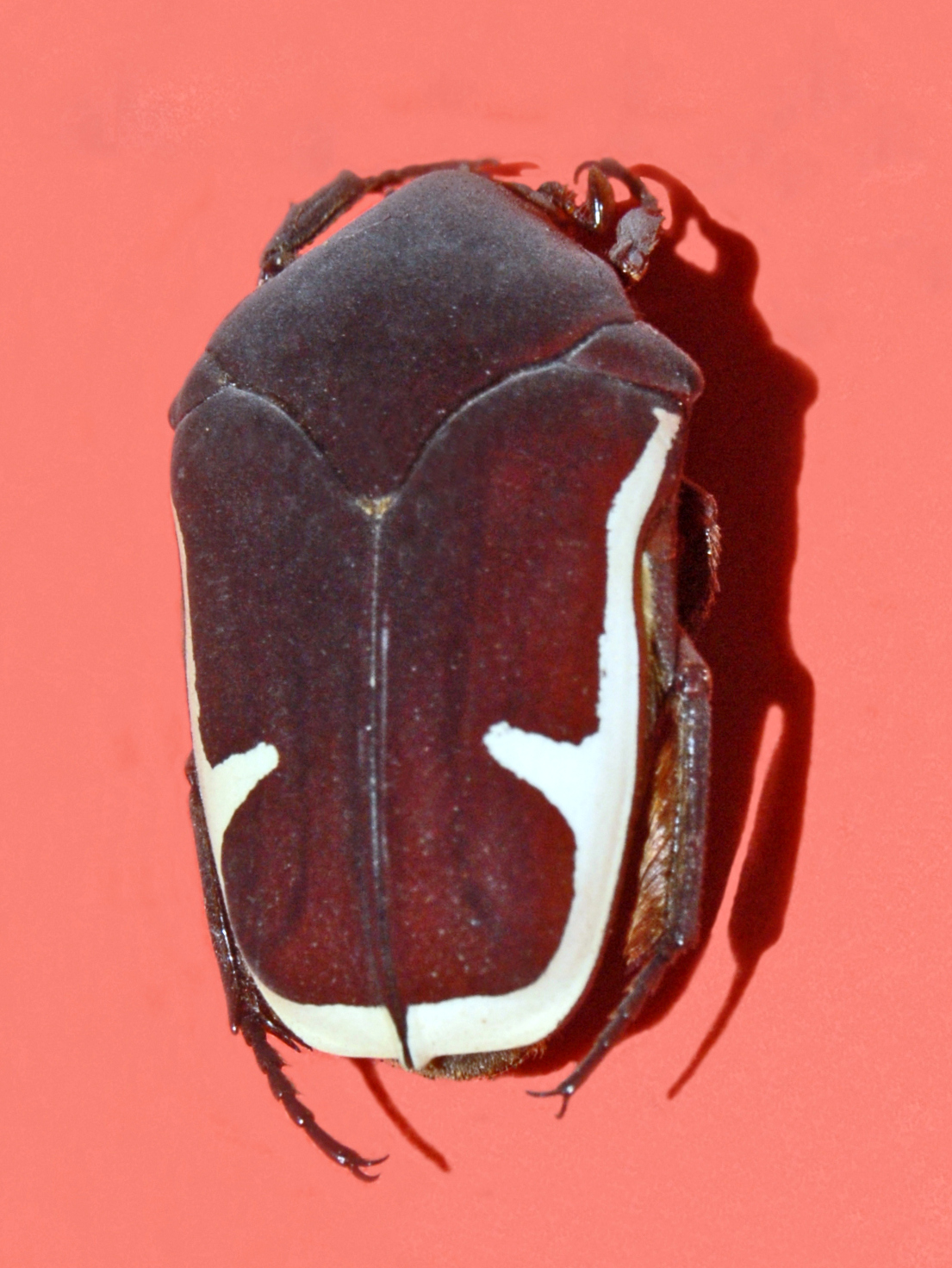
- Museum specimen of Gymnetis holosericea

Scientific classification
- Kingdom: Animalia
- Phylum: Arthropoda
- Class: Insecta
- Order: Coleoptera
- Suborder: Polyphaga
- Infraorder: Scarabaeiformia
- Family: Scarabaeidae
- Subfamily: Cetoniinae
- Tribe: Gymnetini
- Genus: Gymnetis; MacLeay, 1819

Synonyms
- Gymnotus Berthold, 1827 (preocc.); Paragymnetis Schürhoff, 1937; Aemilius Le Moult, 1939; Gymnetoides Martínez, 1949; Gymnetosoma Martinez, 1949

= Gymnetis =

Genus of beetles

Gymnetis is a genus of beetles of the family Scarabaeidae and subfamily Cetoniinae.

== Species ==
- Gymnetis amazona Ratcliffe, 2018
- Gymnetis aurantivittae Ratcliffe, 2018
- Gymnetis bajula (Olivier, 1789)
- Gymnetis bomplandi Schaum, 1844
- Gymnetis bouvieri Bourgoin, 1912
- Gymnetis carbo (Schürhoff, 1937)
- Gymnetis cerdai Antoine, 2001
- Gymnetis chalcipes Gory & Percheron, 1833
- Gymnetis chevrolati Gory & Percheron, 1833
- Gymnetis coturnix Burmeister, 1842
- Gymnetis difficilis Burmeister, 1842
- Gymnetis drogoni Ratcliffe, 2018
- Gymnetis flava (Weber, 1801)
- Gymnetis flaveola (Fabricius, 1801)
- Gymnetis flavomarginata Blanchard, 1846
- Gymnetis hebraica (Drapiez, 1820)
- Gymnetis hieroglyphica Vigors, 1825
- Gymnetis holosericea (Olivier, 1789)
- Gymnetis lanius (Linnaeus, 1758)
- Gymnetis litigiosa Gory & Percheron, 1833
- Gymnetis margineguttata Gory & Percheron, 1833
- Gymnetis marmorea (Olivier, 1789)
- Gymnetis merops Ratcliffe, 2018
- Gymnetis pantherina Burmeister, 1842
- Gymnetis pardalis Gory & Percheron, 1833
- Gymnetis poecila Schaum, 1848
- Gymnetis pudibunda Burmeister, 1866
- Gymnetis puertoricensis Ratcliffe, 2018
- Gymnetis pulchra (Swederus, 1787)
- Gymnetis punctipennis Burmeister, 1842
- Gymnetis rhaegali Ratcliffe, 2018
- Gymnetis rufilatris (Illiger, 1800)
- Gymnetis sallei Schaum, 1849
- Gymnetis sculptiventris Thomson, 1878
- Gymnetis stellata (Latreille, 1813)
- Gymnetis strigosa (Olivier, 1789)
- Gymnetis thula Ratcliffe, 2018 (= G. caseyi Antoine, 2001)
- Gymnetis subpunctata Westwood, 1874
- Gymnetis viserioni Ratcliffe, 2018
- Gymnetis xanthospila Schaum, 1844
