= Gymnetis drogoni =

Scientific classification
- Kingdom: Animalia
- Phylum: Arthropoda
- Clade: Pancrustacea
- Class: Insecta
- Order: Coleoptera
- Suborder: Polyphaga
- Infraorder: Scarabaeiformia
- Family: Scarabaeidae
- Genus: Gymnetis
- Species: G. drogoni

Binomial name
- Gymnetis drogoni Ratcliffe, 2018

Species of beetle

Gymnetis drogoni is a species of scarab beetle in the family Scarabaeidae, named after the dragon Drogon in the fantasy novel series A Song of Ice and Fire.
