= Gymnetis rhaegali =

Scientific classification
- Kingdom: Animalia
- Phylum: Arthropoda
- Clade: Pancrustacea
- Class: Insecta
- Order: Coleoptera
- Suborder: Polyphaga
- Infraorder: Scarabaeiformia
- Family: Scarabaeidae
- Genus: Gymnetis
- Species: G. rhaegali

Binomial name
- Gymnetis rhaegali Ratcliffe, 2018

Species of beetle

Gymnetis rhaegali is a species of scarab beetle in the family Scarabaeidae, named after the dragon Rhaegal in the fantasy novel series A Song of Ice and Fire.
