= Adolpho Ducke =

Brazilian entomologist and botanist (1876–1959)

- Born: October 19, 1876; Trieste, Austria-Hungary
- Died: January 5, 1959 (aged 82); Fortaleza, Ceará, Brazil
- Citizenship: Brazilian
- Known for: Taxonomy of Amazon wasps, bees, and trees
- Awards: Reserva Florestal Adolpho Ducke (in Manaus); Adolpho Ducke's Botanical Garden (in Manaus)
- Scientific career
- Fields: Entomology and Botany
- Workplaces: Museu Paraense Emílio Goeldi; Rio de Janeiro Botanical Garden
- Doctoral advisor: Heinrich Friese
- Author abbrev. (botany): Ducke
- Author abbrev. (zoology): Ducke

Adolpho Ducke (October 19, 1876 – January 5, 1959), (also referred to as Adolfo Ducke and occasionally misspelled "Duque"), was a notable entomologist, botanist and ethnographer specializing in Amazonia. According to family records, he was an ethnic German with roots in Trieste Austro-Hungary (now in Italy). German was his first language; that is, the German commonly spoken in Trieste in the 19th century. Most of his books were written in German.

Recruited by Emílio Goeldi, Ducke began his work in Amazônia as an entomologist for the Museu Paraense Emílio Goeldi, but due to the influence of botanists Jacques Hüber and Paul Le Cointe, he switched to botany. He traveled throughout Amazônia to study the complicated tree system of the rainforest. He published 180 articles and monographs, primarily on the Leguminosae, and he described 900 species and 50 new genera. In 1918, while continuing his work for the Paraense Museum, he collaborated with the Rio de Janeiro Botanical Garden and the Instituto Agronômico do Norte. In the first half of the 20th century, he became one of the most respected authorities on the Amazonian flora. In 1954, his concerns about the future of the Amazonian forest led him to make a suggestion to the National Institute of Amazonian Research (INPA) for the creation of a nature reserve. He died in Fortaleza in 1959 before witnessing the fulfillment of his dream: In 1963, the Reserva Florestal Adolpho Ducke was established and named in his honour. Also named in his honour is a botanical garden east of Manaus, and the phytochemical research laboratory at the museum in Belém.

Ducke's entomological material is currently located at the Museu Paraense Emílio Goeldi in Belém, the Natural History Museum of Bern, the Museu de Zoologia of the University of São Paulo, and The Natural History Museum, in London. Ducke's general classification of the Neotropical social wasps is still used. Additionally, Ducke is known for his findings on the species Melipona subnitida, a species which he discovered and did significant field research on.

== Honours ==
Adolpho Ducke has been honoured in the naming of several genera of plants including; Duckea (in 1958), Duckeanthus (in 1934), Duckeella (in 1939 ), Duckeodendron (in 1925) and Duckesia (in 1961).

== Entomological publications ==
- Ducke, A. (1897). Aufzahlung der bei Triest im Jahr 1896 von mir gesammelten Osmia-Arten und Beschribung einer neuen Art. Ent. Nachr., 23, 38–43.
- Ducke, A. (1898). Zur Kentnis der Bienenfauna des österreichischen Kustenlandes. Ent. Nachr., 24, 212–217, 257–262.
- Ducke, A. (1899). Neue Arten und Varietaten der Gattung Osmia Panz. Ent. Nachr., 25, 211–215.
- Ducke, A. (1900). Die Bienengattung Osmia Panz., als Erganzung zu Schmiedeknecht's 'Apidae europaeae', col. II, in ihren palaerctischen Arten monographisch bearbeitet. Ber. Ver., 25, 1–323.
- Ducke, A. (1901). Beitrage zur Kenntnis der geographischen Verbreitung der Chrysididen und Beschreibung von drei neuen Arten. Zeitschr. Syst. Hymenopterol. Dipterol., 1, 353–361.
- Ducke, A. (1901). Beobachtungen über Blutenbesuch, Erscheinungszeit etc. der bei Pará vorkommenden Bienen. Zeitschr. Syst. Hymenopterol. Dipterol., 1, 25–32, 49–67.
- Ducke, A. (1901). Zur Kenntnis einiger Sphegiden von Pará (Hym.). Zeitschr. Syst. Hymenopterol. Dipterol., 1, 241–242.
- Ducke, A. (1902). As espécies paraenses do gênero Euglossa Latr. Bol. Mus. Paraense Emilio Goeldi, 3, 561–577.
- Ducke, A. (1902). Beobachtungen über Blutenbesuch, Erscheinungszeit etc. der bei Pará vorkommenden Bienen. Allg. Zeitschr. Entomol., 7, 321–325, 360–368, 400–404, 417–421.
- Ducke, A. (1902). Die stachellosen Bienen (Melipona) von Pará. Zool. Jb. Abt. Syst. Geogr. Biol. Tiere, 17, 285–328.
- Ducke, A. (1902). Ein neue südamerikanische Cleptes-Art. Zeitschr. Syst. Hymenopterol. Dipterol., 2, 91–93.
- Ducke, A. (1902). Ein neues Subgenus von Halictus Latr. Zeitschr. Syst. Hymenopterol. Dipterol., 2, 102–103.
- Ducke, A. (1902). Ein wenig bekanntes Chrysididen genus Amisega Cam. Zeitschr. Syst. Hymenopterol. Dipterol., 2, 141–144.
- Ducke, A. (1902). Neue Arten des Genus Bothynostethus Kohl. Verhandl. Zool. Bot. Ges., 52, 575–580.
- Ducke, A. (1902). Neue Goldwespen von Pará (Hym.). Zeitschr. Syst. Hymenopterol. Dipterol., 2, 204–207.
- Ducke, A. (1902). Neue sudamerikanischen Chrysiden. Zeitschr. Syst. Hymenopterol. Dipterol., 3, 97–104.
- Ducke, A. (1903). Beitrage zur Synonymie der neotropischen Apiden. Zeitschr. Syst. Hymenopterol. Dipterol., 3, 176–177.
- Ducke, A. (1903). Biologische Notizen über einige südamerikanische Hymenoptera. Allgem. Zeitschr. Ent., 8, 368–372.
- Ducke, A. (1903). Biologische Notizen über südamerikanischen Hymenoptera. Allg. Zeit. Entomol., 8, 368.
- Ducke, A. (1903). Neue Grabwespen vom Gebiete des unteren Amazonas. Verhandlungen der kaiserlich-königlichen Zoologisch-Botanischen Gesellschaft in Wien, 53, 265–270.
- Ducke, A. (1903). Neue südamerikanische Chrysididen. Zeitschr. Syst. Hymenopterol. Dipterol., 3, 129–136, 226–232.
- Ducke, A. (1904). Beitrag zur Kenntnis der Bienengattung Centris F. Zeitschr. Syst. Hymenopterol. Dipterol., 4, 209–214.
- Ducke, A. (1904). Nachtrag zu dem Artikel über die Sphegiden Nordbrasiliens. Zeitschr. Syst. Hymenopterol. Dipterol., 4, 189–190.
- Ducke, A. (1904). Revisione dei Crisididi dello stato Brasiliano del Pará. Boll. Soc. Ent. Ital., 36, 13–48.
- Ducke, A. (1904). Sobre as Vespidas sociaes do Pará. Bol. Mus. Emílio Goeldi, 4, 317–371.
- Ducke, A. (1904). Zur Kenntnis der Diploptera vom Gebiet des unteren Amazonas. Zeitschr. Syst. Hymenopterol. Dipterol., 4(3), 134–143.
- Ducke, A. (1904). Zur Kenntnis der Sphegiden Nordbrasiliens. Zeitschr. Syst. Hymenopterol. Dipterol., 4, 91–98.
- Ducke, A. (1905). Biologische Notizen über einige Südamerikanische Hymenoptera. Zeitschr. wiss. Insektenbiol., 10/11, 175–177, 117–121.
- Ducke, A. (1905). Nouvelles contributions à la connaissance des Vespides sociaux de l'Amerique du Sud. Rev. Ent., 24, 1-24.
- Ducke, A. (1905). Sobre as Vespidas sociaes do Pará (I. Supplemento). Bol. Mus. Emílio Goeldi, 4, 652–698.
- Ducke, A. (1905). Supplemento alla revisione dei Crisididi dello stato Brasiliano del Pará. Boll. Soc. Ent. Ital., 36, 99–109.
- Ducke, A. (1905). Zur Abgrenzung der neotropischen Schmarotzerbienengattungen aus der nachsten Verwandtschaft von Melissa Smith. Zeitschr. Syst. Hymenopterol. Dipterol., 5, 227–229.
- Ducke, A. (1906). Alla revisione dei Chrysididi dello stato Brasiliano del Pará (second suppl.). Boll. Soc. Ent. Ital., 38, 3–19.
- Ducke, A. (1906). Beitrag zur Kenntnis der Solitärbienen Brasiliens. Zeitschr. Syst. Hymenopterol. Dipterol., 6, 394–400.
- Ducke, A. (1906). Biologische Notizen über einige Südamerikanische Hymenoptera. Zeitschr. wiss. Insektenbiol., 2, 17–21.
- Ducke, A. (1906). Contribution à la connaissance de fauna hymènoptérologique du Brésil central-méridional. Rev. Ent., 25, 5–11.
- Ducke, A. (1906). Les espécies de Polistomorpha Westw. Bull. Soc. Ent. Fr., 1906, 163–166.
- Ducke, A. (1906). Neue Beobachtungen über die Bienen der Amazonasländer. Zeitschr. Syst. Hymenopterol. Dipterol., 2, 51–60.
- Ducke, A. (1906). Supplemento alla revisione dei Chrysididi dello stato Brasiliano del Pará. (Second suppl.). Boll. Soc. Ent. Ital., 38, 3–19.
- Ducke, A. (1907 (1908)). Contribution à la connaissance de la faune hyménoptérologique du nord-est du Brésil. Rev. Ent., 26, 73–96.
- Ducke, A. (1907). Beitrag zur Kenntnis der Solitärbienen Brasiliens. Zeitschr. Syst. Hymenopterol. Dipterol., 7, 80, 321–325, 361–368, 455–461.
- Ducke, A. (1907). Contribution à la connaissance des scoliides de l'Amérique du Sud. Rev. Ent., 26, 5–9.
- Ducke, A. (1907). Contributions à la connaissance des scoliides de l'Amérique du Sud. II. Rev. Ent., 26, 145–148.
- Ducke, A. (1907). Nouveau genre de Sphégides. Ann. Soc. Ent. Fr., 76, 28–30.
- Ducke, A. (1907). Novas contribuições para o conhecimento das vespas sociaes (Vespidae sociales) da região neotropical. Bol. Mus. Paraense Emílio Goeldi, 5, 152–199.
- Ducke, A. (1907). Zur Synonymie einiger Hymenopteren Amazoniens. Zeitschr. Syst. Hymenopterol. Dipterol., 7, 137–141.
- Ducke, A. (1908). Beiträge zur Hymenopterenkunde Amerikas. Dt. ent. Zeitschr., 1908, 695–700.
- Ducke, A. (1908). Contribution à la connaissance de la faune hyménoptèrologique du nord-est du Brésil. II. Hyménoptères récoltés dans l'Etat de Ceará en 1908. Rev. Ent., 27, 57–87.
- Ducke, A. (1908). Contribution à la connaissance des hyménoptères des deux Amériques. Rev. Ent., 27, 28–55.
- Ducke, A. (1908). Zur Kenntnis der Schmarotzerbienen Brasiliens. Zeitschr. Syst. Hymenopterol. Dipterol., 8, 44–47, 99–104.
- Ducke, A. (1909 (1911)). Alla revisione dei chrysidi dello stato Brasiliano del Pará (third suppl.). Boll. Soc. Ent. Ital., 41, 89–115.
- Ducke, A. (1909). Deux vespides nouveaux du Muséum National Hungrois. Ann. Hist. Nat. Mus. Nat. Hungarici, 7, 626–627.
- Ducke, A. (1909). Odyneropsis Schrottky, genre d'abeilles parasites mimétiques. Bull. Soc. Ent. Fr., 18, 306–309.
- Ducke, A. (1909). Terzo suplemento alla revisione dei crisididi dello stato brasiliano del Pará. Boll. Soc. Ent. Ital., 41, 89–115.
- Ducke, A. (1910). Contribution à la connaissance de la faune hymènoptérologique du nord-est du Brésil. Rev. Ent., 28, 78–122.
- Ducke, A. (1910). Contribution à la connaissance des scoliides de l'Amérique du Sud. III. Rev. Ent., 28, 73–77.
- Ducke, A. (1910). Explorações botânicas e entomológicas no Estado do Ceará. Rev. Trimestral do Instituto do Ceará, 24, 3-61.
- Ducke, A. (1910). Révision des guêpes sociales polygames d'Amérique. Ann. Mus. Nat. Hungarici, 8, 449–544.
- Ducke, A. (1910). Sur quelques euménides (Guepes solitaires) du Brésil. Rev. Ent., 28, 180–192.
- Ducke, A. (1910). Zur Synonymie der neotropischen Apidae (Hym.). Deutsch. Ent. Zeitschr., 1910, 362–369.
- Ducke, A. (1912). Die natürlichen Bienengenera Südamerikas. Zool. Jb. Abt. Syst. Geogr. Biol. Tiere, 34, 51–116.
- Ducke, A. (1913). As Chrysididas do Brazil. Catálogos da Fauna Brazileira, Museu Paulista, 4, 1-31.
- Ducke, A. (1913). O gênero Pterombus Smith. Rev. Mus. Paulista, 5, 107–122.
- Ducke, A. (1913). Synonymie einiger Hymenopteren. Deutsch. Ent. Zeitschr., 1913, 330–333.
- Ducke, A. (1914). Über Phylogenie und Klassifikation der sozialen Vespiden. Zool. Jb. Abt. Syst. Geogr. Biol. Tiere, 36, 303–330.
- Ducke, A. (1916). Enumeração dos hymenópteros colligidos pela Comissão e revisão das espécies de abelhas do Brasil. Commissão de Linhas Telegráficas Estratégicas de Matto Grosso ao Amazonas, 35 (anexo 5), 1–175.
- Ducke, A. (1918). Catálogo das vespas sociaes do Brazil. Rev. Mus. Paulista, 10, 314–374.
- Ducke, A. (1925). Die stachellosen Bienen Brasiliens. Zool. Jb. Abt. Syst. Geogr. Biol. Tiere, 49, 335–448.

== Botanical publications ==
- Ducke, A. (1910). Explorações botânicas e entomológicas no Estado do Ceará. Rev. Trimestral do Instituto do Ceará, 24, 3-61.

== Other sources ==
- Egler, W. A. (1963). Adolpho Ducke-traços biográficos, viagens e trabalhos. Boletim do Museu Emílio Goeldi. Nova série. Botânica, 18, 1–129.
- Overal, W. L. (1978). Designação de lectótipos de onze espécies de vespas sociais descritas por Adolpho Ducke, e notas sobre a coleção Ducke (Hymenoptera: Vespidae). Bol. Mus. Paraense Emílio Goeldi, n.s., Zool., 94, 1–14.
- Nascimento, P. T. R., & Overal, W. L. (1979). Contribuições entomológicas de Adolpho Ducke: taxônomia e bibliográfia. Bol. Mus. Paraense Emílio Goeldi, n.s., Zool., 95, 1-22.
- Overal, W. L. (1979). The collection of Adolph Ducke. Sphecos, 1, 17–19.
- Overal, W. L., & Nascimento, P. T. R. (1979). Contribuições entomológicas de Adolpho Ducke: Taxonomia e bibliografia. Bol. Mus. Paraense Emílio Goeldi, n.s., Zool., 95, 1–17.
- Carpenter, J. M. (1999). Taxonomic notes on paper wasps (Hymenoptera: Vespidae; Polistinae). American Museum Novitates (3259), 1-44.
