= Adolfo Ducke Forest Reserve =

Amazon rainforest reserve in Brazil

- Reserva Florestal Adolpho Ducke
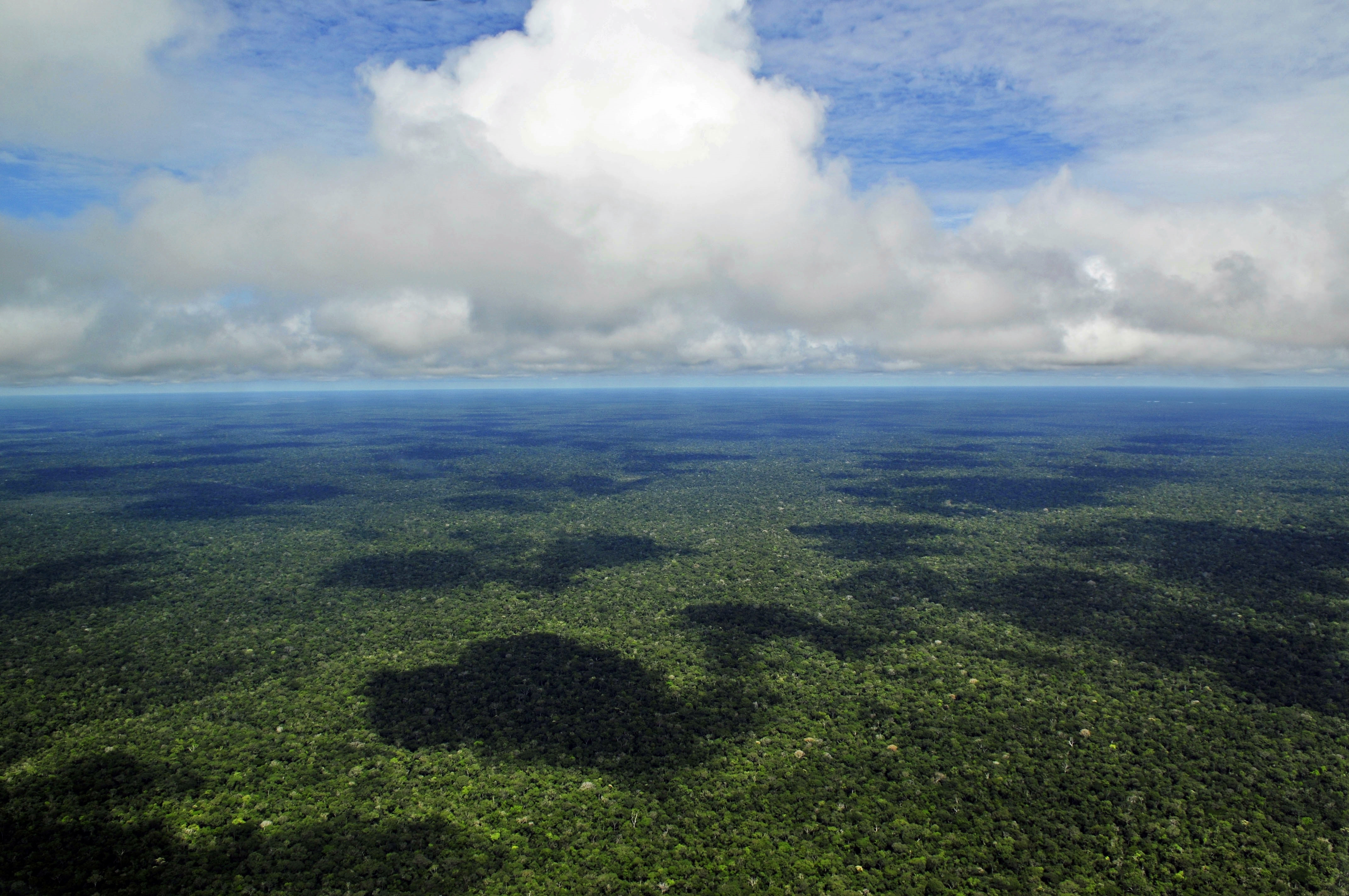
- Aerial view of the Amazon rainforest, near Manaus
- Interactive map of Adolfo Ducke Forest Reserve
- Location: Amazon rainforest
- Nearest city: Manaus, Brazil
- Coordinates: 2°57′43.56″S 59°55′54.48″W
- Area: 10,000 ha (39 sq mi)
- Established: 1963

The Adolfo Ducke Forest Reserve (Portuguese: Reserva Florestal Adolpho Ducke) is a 10,000-hectare (25,000-acre) protected area of the Amazon rainforest on the outskirts of the city of Manaus, Brazil.

The reserve was established in 1963 in honour of the entomologist and botanist Adolfo Ducke (1876–1959), who was one of the most respected experts on Amazonian flora. It is part of the Long Term Ecological Research Network (LTER). The reserve sits at the intersection of two major drainage areas, the Amazon River and the Rio Negro. The reserve is made up of research plots designed to study the biota of the regions, which serve as a basis for biodiversity surveys in other areas of the Amazon region, and studies on the impacts of fragmentation. The grid of LTER sites is made up of 25-square-kilometre (9.7 sq mi) plots inserted into a larger grid of 64-square-kilometre (25 sq mi) plots. Within the grid, which is used for straight line transect surveys of biodiversity, there are 250-metre (820 ft) long permanent survey plots.

The Adolfo Ducke Forest Reserve is one of the most intensively studied patches of rainforest in the world. It is one of the most important research sites in the Amazon because it is relatively intact. It is easily accessible from the city of Manaus and includes areas for researchers to stay for extended periods to carry out research.

== Adolfo Ducke Botanical Garden ==
The Adolfo Ducke Botanical Garden was founded on October 24, 2000. Occupying 5% of the Adolfo Ducke Forest Reserve, it has 5 square kilometres (1.9 sq mi) distributed in a strip 500 metres (1,600 ft) wide and 6 kilometres (3.7 mi) long along the southern edge and 4 kilometres (2.5 mi) along the western edge of the Adolpho Ducke Forest Reserve. It is considered the largest preserved forest fragment within an urban area in Brazil. It is located in the Cidade de Deus neighborhood in Manaus. The botanical garden offers direct contact with nature and serves as a tourist attraction.

The Adolfo Ducke Botanical Garden is administered through a partnership between the National Institute of Amazonian Research (INPA), the City of Manaus, and the Museum of the Amazon (MUSA). The Museum of the Amazon was installed in the reserve in 2009 and occupies 1% of the total area of the site.
