= National Institute of Amazonian Research =

Research institute in Manaus, Brazil

- Instituto Nacional de Pesquisas da Amazônia
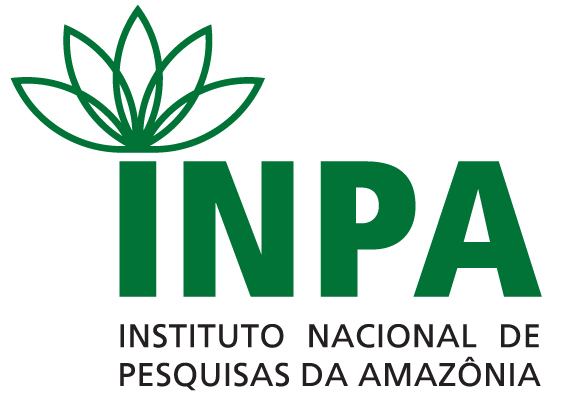
- Logo of the National Institute of Amazonian Research
- Established: 1952; 74 years ago
- Field of research: Ecology, Zoology, Botany
- Director: Luiz Renato de França
- Location: Av. André Araújo, 2936, Bairro Petropolis, Manaus, Amazonas, CEP 69060-001, Brazil; 3.09577°S 59.98975°W
- Website: http://www.inpa.gov.br/

The National Institute of Amazonian Research (Instituto Nacional de Pesquisas da Amazônia or INPA) is a public educational and research institution headquartered in Manaus, Brazil. It was founded in 1952, with the purpose of furthering scientific knowledge of the Brazilian Amazon Region. Most of INPA's research focuses on tropical forest management, ecology, molecular ecology, zoology, botany, tropical agriculture and tropical pisciculture. The institution also maintains important vertebrate, invertebrate, and vascular plants research collections.

It also publishes the scientific journal Acta Amazônica.

== Graduate programs ==
Graduate programs offered by INPA:

- Agriculture in the Humid Tropics (Masters and Doctorate)
- Botany (Masters and Doctorate)
- Ecology (Masters and Doctorate)
- Entomology (Masters and Doctorate)
- Tropical Forestry (Masters and Doctorate)
- Climate and Environmental Sciences (Masters and Doctorate)
- Genetics, Conservation and Evolutionary Biology (Masters and Doctorate)
- Freshwater Biology and Inland Fisheries (Masters and Doctorate)
- Aquaculture (Masters)
- Management of Protected Areas in the Amazon (Professional Masters)

== See also ==
- Reserva Florestal Adolpho Ducke
