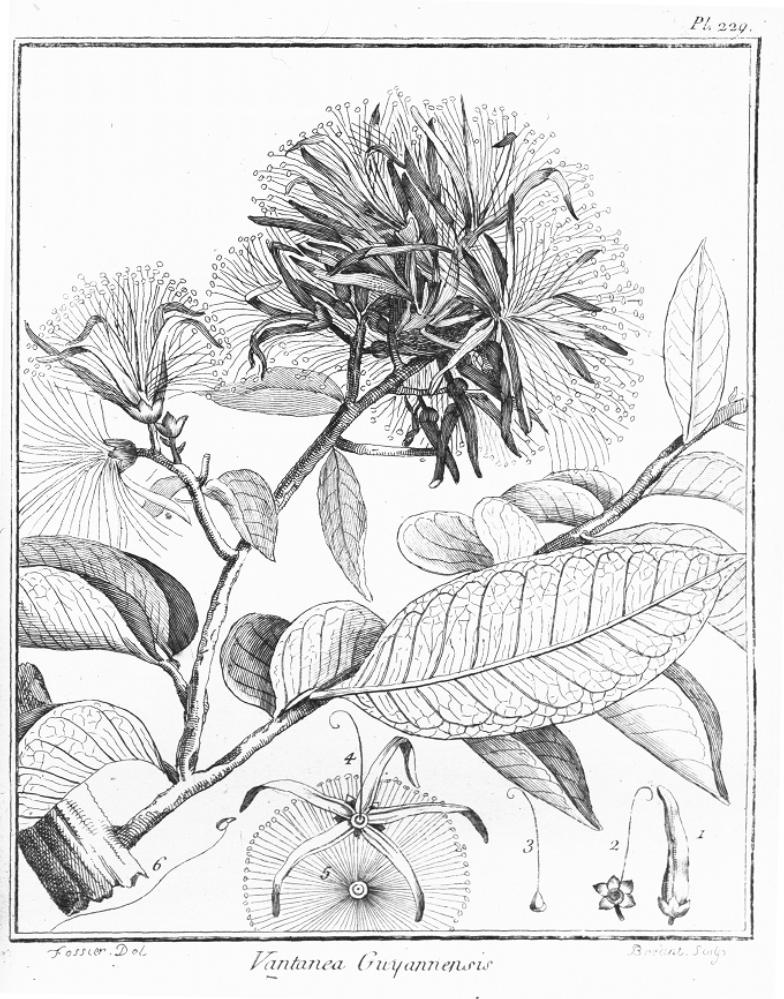
- Vantanea guianensis

Scientific classification
- Kingdom: Plantae
- Clade: Tracheophytes
- Clade: Angiosperms
- Clade: Eudicots
- Clade: Rosids
- Order: Malpighiales
- Family: Humiriaceae; A.Juss.

Genera
- Duckesia; Endopleura; Humiria (Houmiria); Humiriastrum; Hylocarpa; Sacoglottis; Schistostemon; Vantanea

= Humiriaceae =

Humiriaceae Temporal range: Eocene - recent

Family of flowering plants

Humiriaceae (or, alternatively Houmiriaceae Juss.) is a family of evergreen flowering plants. It comprises 8 genera and 56 known species. The family is exclusively Neotropical, except one species found in tropical West Africa.
