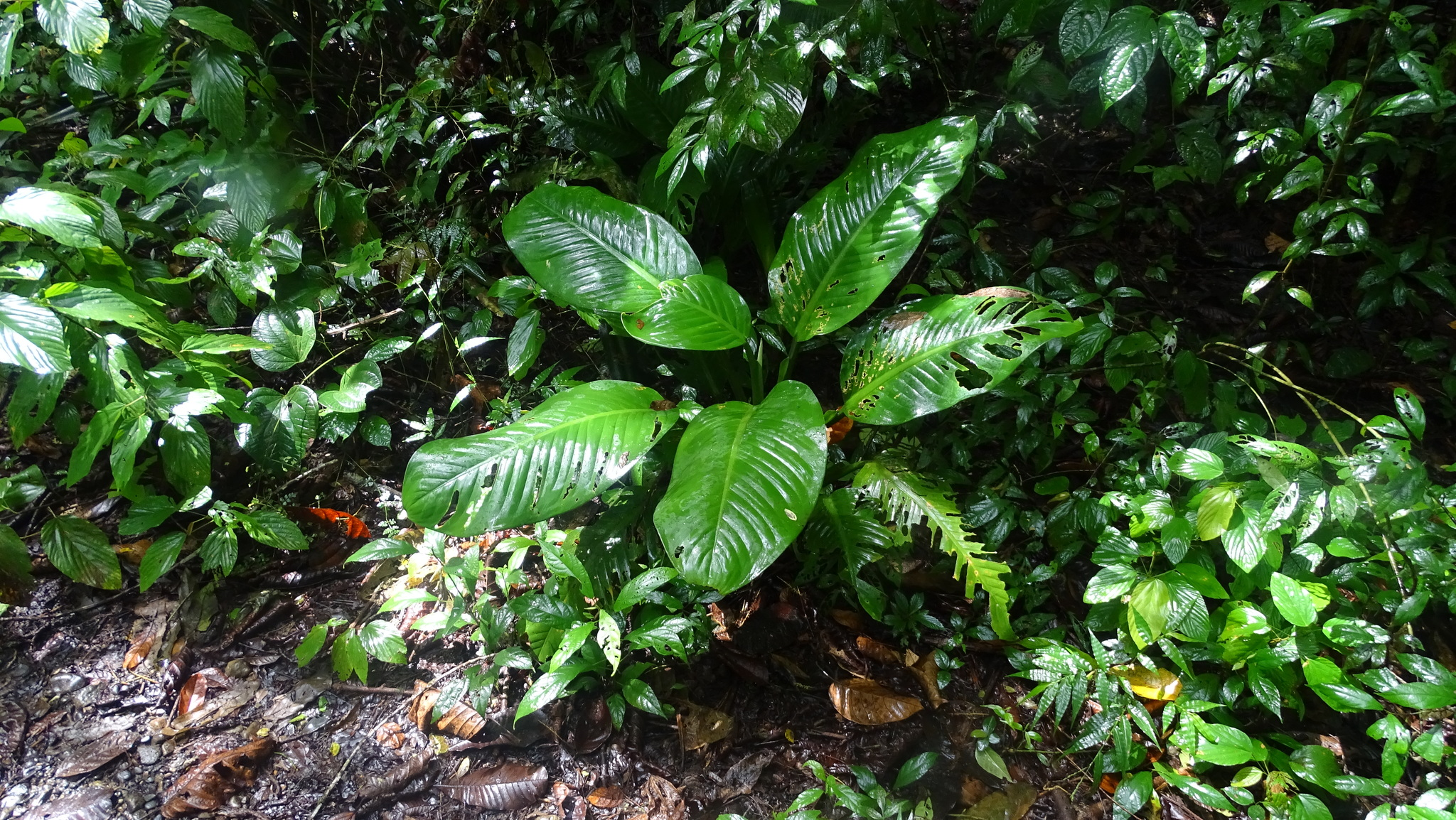
- Habit

Scientific classification
- Kingdom: Plantae
- Clade: Embryophytes
- Clade: Tracheophytes
- Clade: Angiosperms
- Clade: Monocots
- Order: Alismatales
- Family: Araceae
- Genus: Dieffenbachia
- Species: D. longispatha

Binomial name
- Dieffenbachia longispatha Engl. & K.Krause

= Dieffenbachia longispatha =

Species of flowering plant

Dieffenbachia longispatha is a species of flowering plant in the family Araceae, native to Panama and Colombia. A large member of its genus, reaching 2–3 m (7–10 ft), it is pollinated by scarab beetles from the genera Cyclocephala and Erioscelis.
