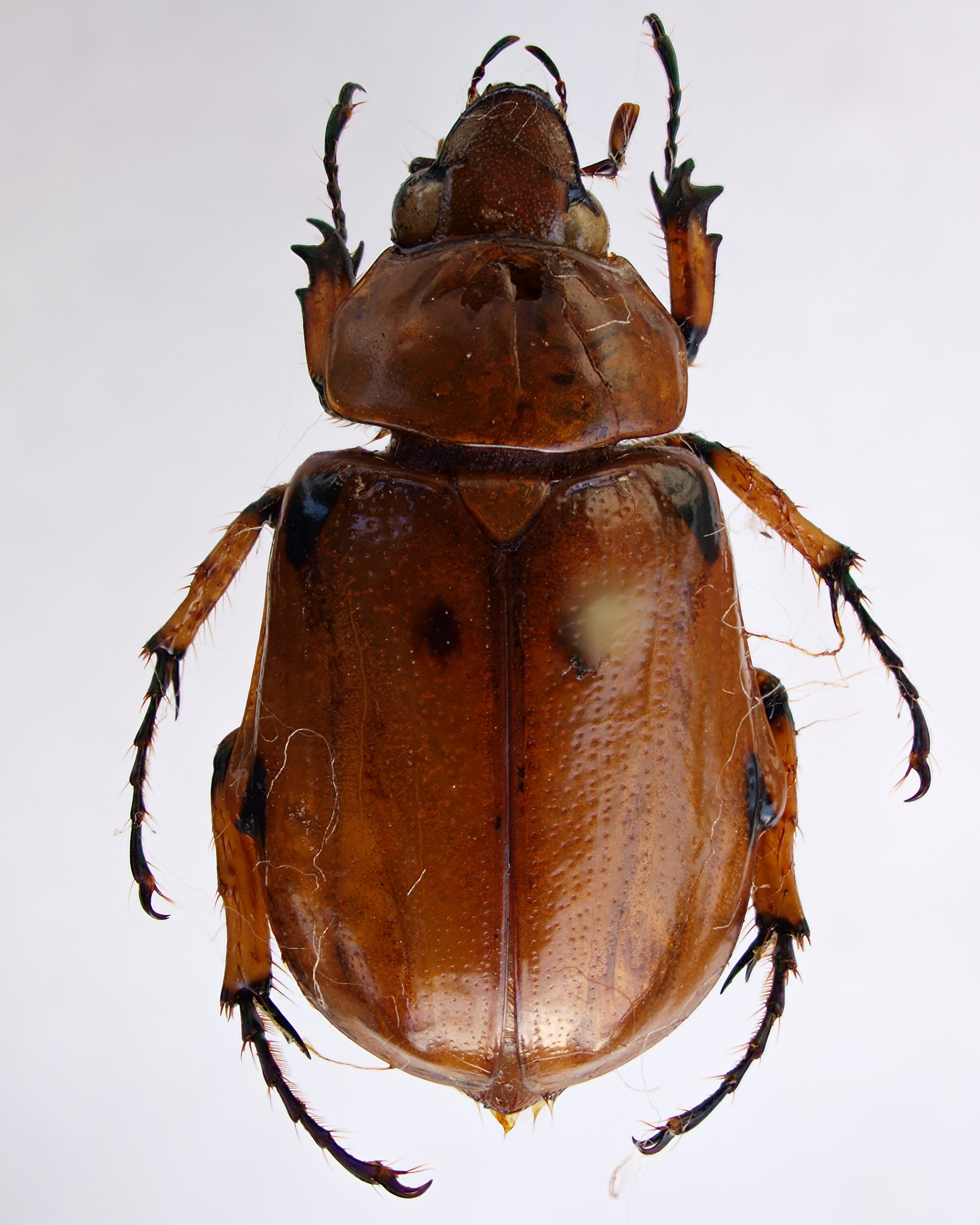
- Ancognatha vulgaris

Scientific classification
- Kingdom: Animalia
- Phylum: Arthropoda
- Class: Insecta
- Order: Coleoptera
- Suborder: Polyphaga
- Infraorder: Scarabaeiformia
- Family: Scarabaeidae
- Tribe: Cyclocephalini
- Genus: Ancognatha; Erichson, 1847

Synonyms
- Barotheus Bates, 1891; Pseudancognatha Otoya, 1945

= Ancognatha =

Genus of beetles

Ancognatha is a genus of rhinoceros beetles in the family Scarabaeidae. There are more than 20 described species in Ancognatha.

== Species ==
These 22 species belong to the genus Ancognatha:

- Ancognatha atacazo (Kirsch, 1885)
- Ancognatha aymara Mondaca, 2016
- Ancognatha castanea Erichson, 1847
- Ancognatha corcuerai Figueroa & Ratcliffe, 2016
- Ancognatha erythrodera (Blanchard, 1846)
- Ancognatha gracilis Endrödi, 1966
- Ancognatha horrida Endrödi, 1967
- Ancognatha humeralis (Burmeister, 1847)
- Ancognatha hyltonscottae Martinez, 1965
- Ancognatha jamesoni Murray, 1857
- Ancognatha lutea Erichson, 1847
- Ancognatha manca (LeConte, 1866)
- Ancognatha matilei Dechambre, 2000
- Ancognatha nigriventris Otoya, 1945
- Ancognatha quadripunctata Bates, 1888
- Ancognatha rugulosa Endrödi, 1966
- Ancognatha scarabaeoides Erichson, 1847
- Ancognatha sellata Arrow, 1911
- Ancognatha ustulata (Burmeister, 1847)
- Ancognatha veliae Pardo-Locarno, Gonzalez & Montoya-Lerma, 2006
- Ancognatha vexans Ratcliffe, 1992
- Ancognatha vulgaris Arrow, 1911
