= Erioscelis proba =

Scientific classification
- Kingdom: Animalia
- Phylum: Arthropoda
- Clade: Pancrustacea
- Class: Insecta
- Order: Coleoptera
- Suborder: Polyphaga
- Infraorder: Scarabaeiformia
- Family: Scarabaeidae
- Genus: Erioscelis
- Species: E. proba

Binomial name
- Erioscelis proba (Sharp, 1877)

Synonyms
- Cyclocephala proba Sharp, 1877; Erioscelis obtusa Prell, 1914; Dyscinetus curtus Kirsch, 1873

Species of beetle

Erioscelis proba is a species of beetle of the family Scarabaeidae. It is found in Argentina, Bolivia, Brazil (Amazonas), Colombia, Ecuador, French Guiana and Peru.
