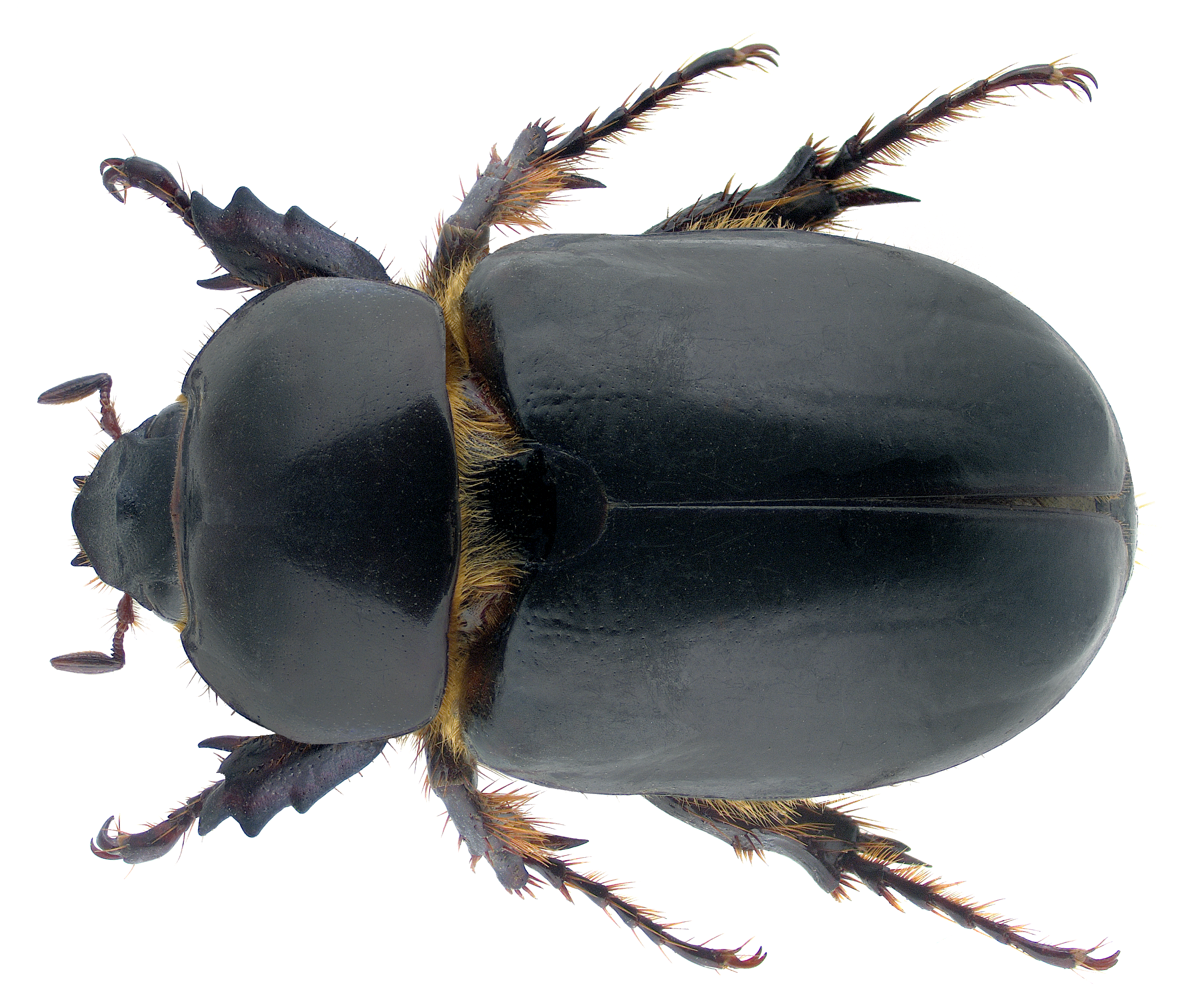
- Ancognatha castanea

Scientific classification
- Kingdom: Animalia
- Phylum: Arthropoda
- Clade: Pancrustacea
- Class: Insecta
- Order: Coleoptera
- Suborder: Polyphaga
- Infraorder: Scarabaeiformia
- Family: Scarabaeidae
- Subfamily: Dynastinae
- Tribe: Cyclocephalini; Laporte, 1840

Type genus
- Cyclocephala Dejean, 1821

Synonyms
- Cyclocephalites Laporte, 1840; Chalepidae Burmeister, 1847; Peltonotini Arrow, 1917; Acrobolbiina Ohaus, 1918

= Cyclocephalini =

Tribe of beetles

Cyclocephalini is a tribe of scarab beetles in the family Scarabaeidae.

== Genera ==
These 16 genera belong to the tribe Cyclocephalini:

Acrobolbia Ohaus, 1912
Ancognatha Erichson, 1847
Arriguttia Martinez, 1960
Aspidolea Bates, 1888
Augoderia Burmeister, 1847
Chalepides Casey, 1915
Cyclocephala Dejean, 1821 (masked chafers)
Dyscinetus Harold, 1869 (rice beetles)
Erioscelis Burmeister, 1847
Harposceles Burmeister, 1847
Mimeoma Casey, 1915
Parapucaya Prell, 1934
Pucaya Ohaus, 1910
Ruteloryctes Arrow, 1908
Stenocrates Burmeister, 1847
Surutu Martinez, 1955
