= Erioscelis peruana =

Scientific classification
- Kingdom: Animalia
- Phylum: Arthropoda
- Clade: Pancrustacea
- Class: Insecta
- Order: Coleoptera
- Suborder: Polyphaga
- Infraorder: Scarabaeiformia
- Family: Scarabaeidae
- Genus: Erioscelis
- Species: E. peruana

Binomial name
- Erioscelis peruana Saylor, 1946

Species of beetle

Erioscelis peruana is a species of beetle of the family Scarabaeidae. It is found in Peru.
