= Dyscinetus picipes =

Scientific classification
- Kingdom: Animalia
- Phylum: Arthropoda
- Class: Insecta
- Order: Coleoptera
- Suborder: Polyphaga
- Infraorder: Scarabaeiformia
- Family: Scarabaeidae
- Genus: Dyscinetus
- Species: D. picipes

Binomial name
- Dyscinetus picipes (Burmeister, 1847)

Synonyms
- Chalepus obsoletus LeConte, 1854; Dyscinetus ebeninus Casey, 1915; Dyscinetus geminatus Jacquelin du Val, 1856; Dyscinetus gilanus Casey, 1915; Dyscinetus obsidianus Casey, 1915; Dyscinetus puncticauda Casey, 1909; Dyscinetus punctipes Bates, 1888; Dyscinetus subquadratus Casey, 1915

Species of beetle

Dyscinetus picipes is a species of rhinoceros beetle in the family Scarabaeidae.
