= Erioscelis columbica =

Scientific classification
- Kingdom: Animalia
- Phylum: Arthropoda
- Clade: Pancrustacea
- Class: Insecta
- Order: Coleoptera
- Suborder: Polyphaga
- Infraorder: Scarabaeiformia
- Family: Scarabaeidae
- Genus: Erioscelis
- Species: E. columbica

Binomial name
- Erioscelis columbica Endrödi, 1966

Species of beetle

Erioscelis columbica is a species of beetle of the family Scarabaeidae. It is found in Colombia, Costa Rica, Ecuador, Nicaragua, Panama.
