= Erioscelis sobrina =

Scientific classification
- Kingdom: Animalia
- Phylum: Arthropoda
- Clade: Pancrustacea
- Class: Insecta
- Order: Coleoptera
- Suborder: Polyphaga
- Infraorder: Scarabaeiformia
- Family: Scarabaeidae
- Genus: Erioscelis
- Species: E. sobrina

Binomial name
- Erioscelis sobrina Höhne, 1921

Species of beetle

Erioscelis sobrina is a species of beetle of the family Scarabaeidae. It is found in Brazil (Pernambuco), Colombia, Panama and Venezuela.
