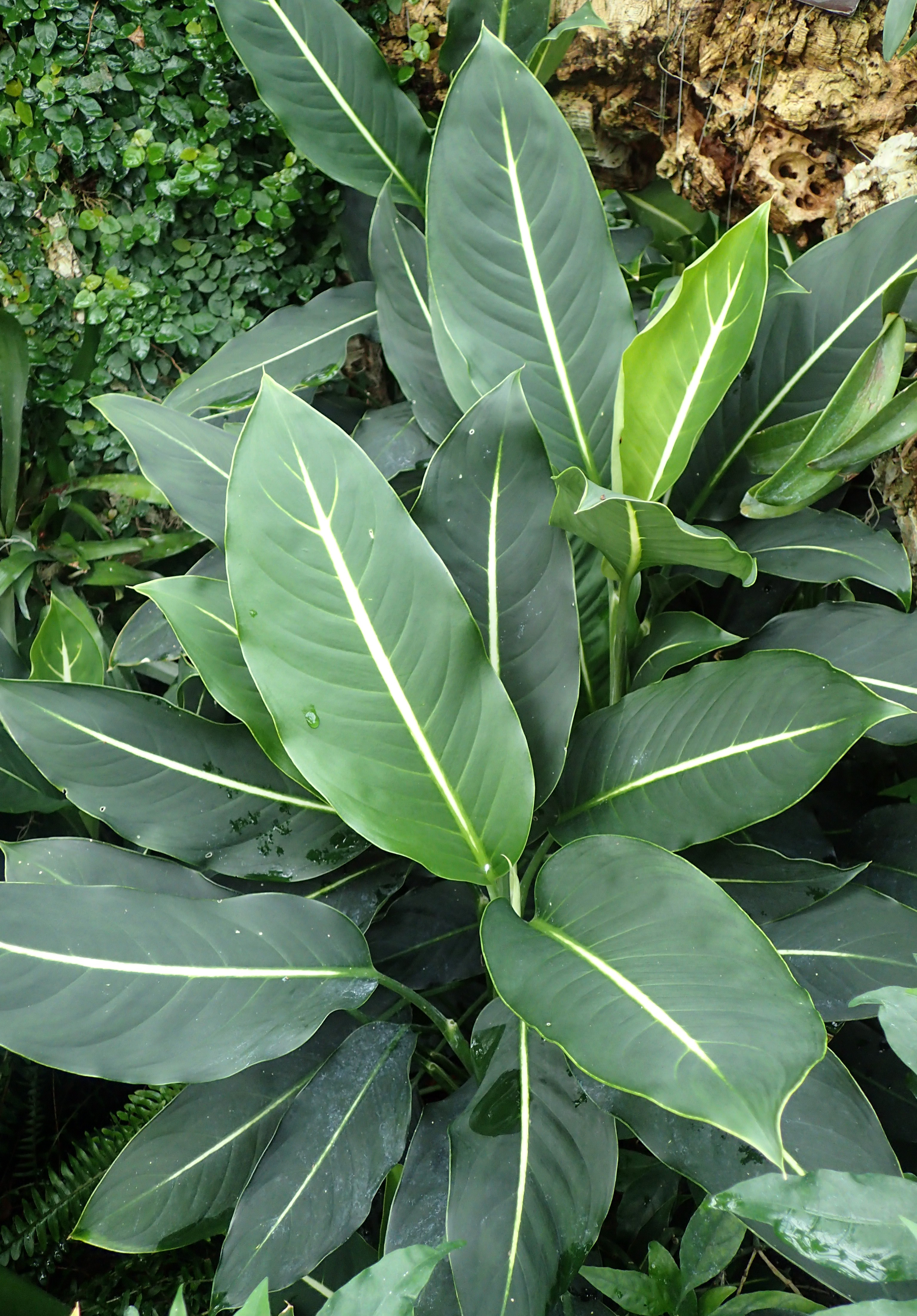
- Dieffenbachia oerstedii at Chicago Botanic Garden

Scientific classification
- Kingdom: Plantae
- Clade: Tracheophytes
- Clade: Angiosperms
- Clade: Monocots
- Order: Alismatales
- Family: Araceae
- Subfamily: Aroideae
- Tribe: Dieffenbachieae
- Genus: Dieffenbachia; Schott
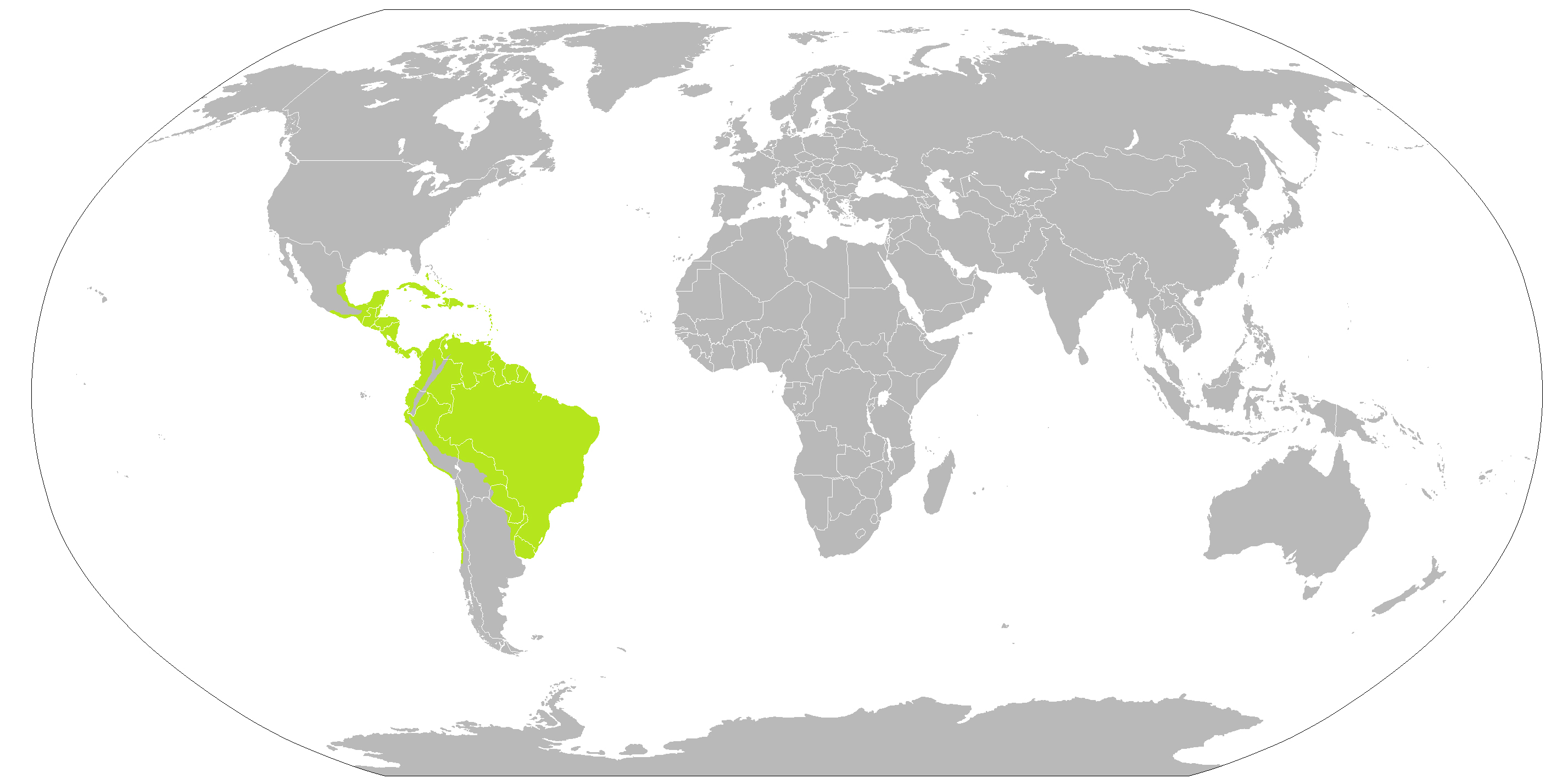

Synonyms
- Maguirea A.D.Hawkes; Seguinum Raf.

= Dieffenbachia =

Genus of plants

Dieffenbachia, commonly known as dumb cane or leopard lily, is a genus of tropical flowering plants in the family Araceae. It is native to the New World Tropics from Mexico and the West Indies south to Argentina. Some species are widely cultivated as ornamental plants, especially as houseplants, and have become naturalized on a few tropical islands.

Dieffenbachia is a perennial herbaceous plant with straight stem, simple and alternate leaves containing white spots and flecks, making it attractive as indoor foliage. Species in this genus are popular as houseplants because of their tolerance of shade. The English names, dumb cane and mother-in-law's tongue (also used for Sansevieria species) refer to the poisoning effect of raphides, which can cause temporary inability to speak. Dieffenbachia was named by Heinrich Wilhelm Schott, director of the Botanical Gardens in Vienna, to honor his head gardener Joseph Dieffenbach (1790–1863).

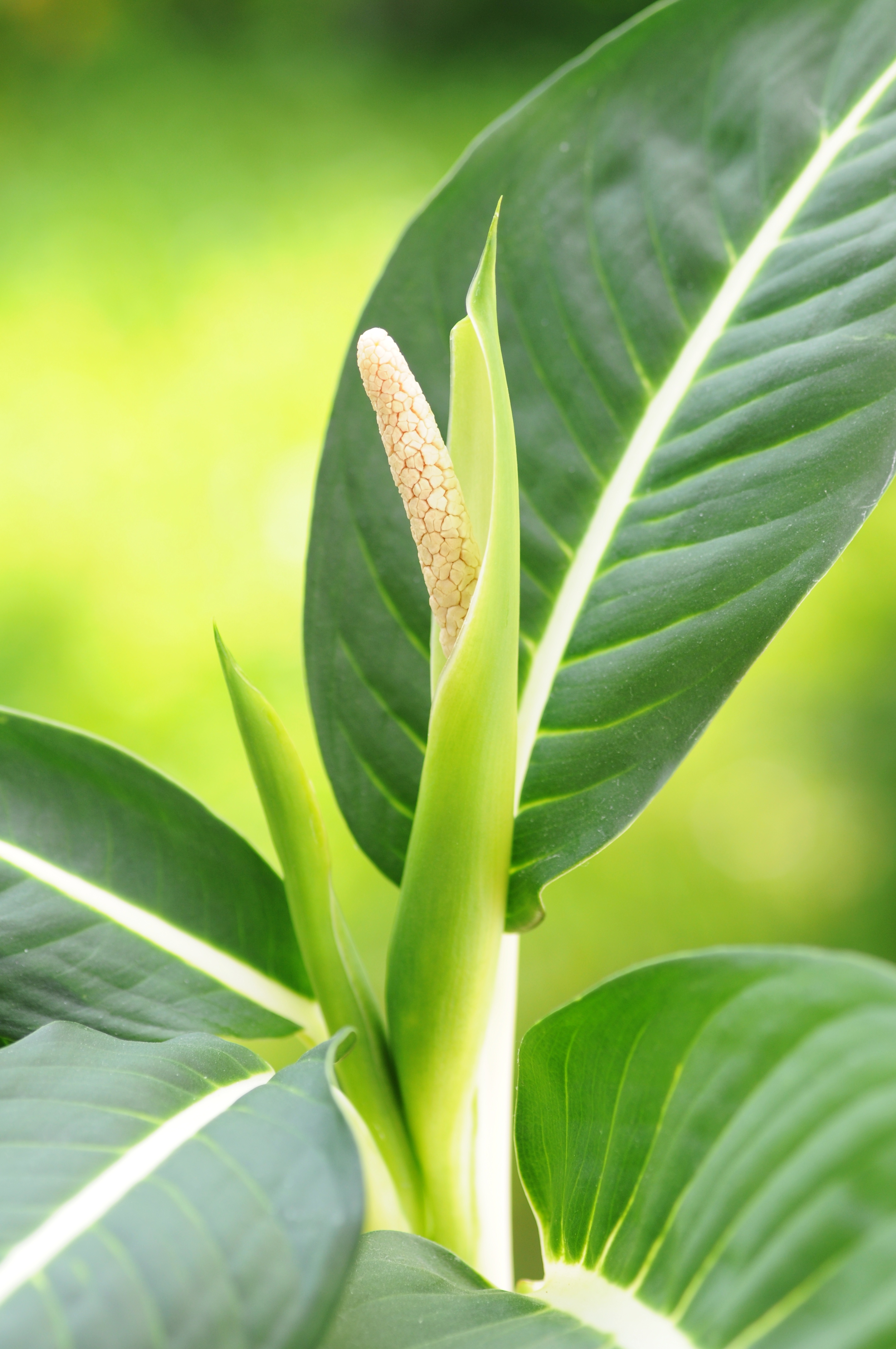
Inflorescence of Dieffenbachia oerstedii

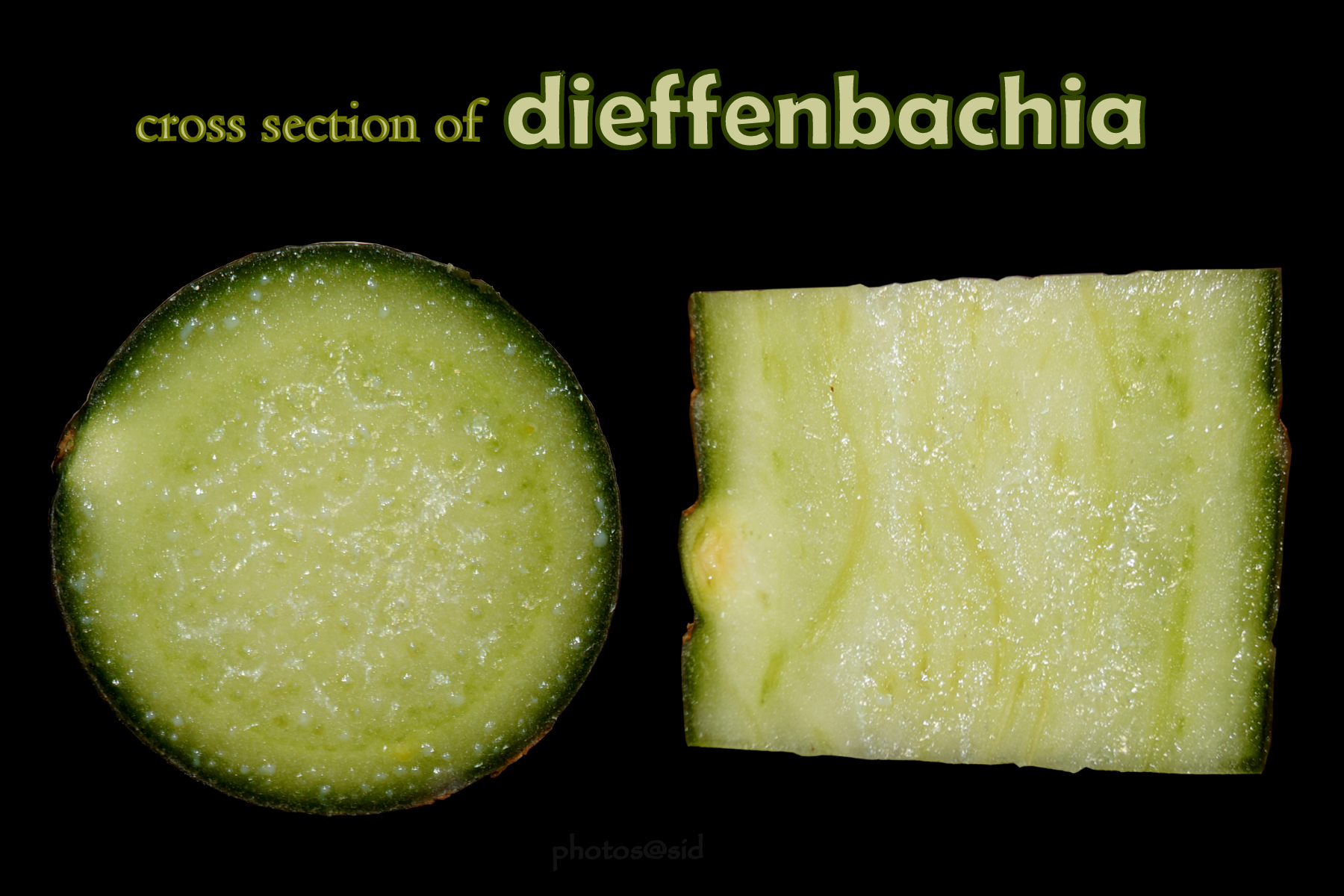
Cross section and radial section of stem

== Species ==
As of January 2026, Plants of the World Online accepts the following 60 species:

- Dieffenbachia aglaonematifolia Engl.
- Dieffenbachia antioquensis Linden ex Rafarin
- Dieffenbachia aurantiaca Engl.
- Dieffenbachia batistae O.Ortiz & Croat
- Dieffenbachia beachiana Croat & Grayum
- Dieffenbachia bowmanni H.J.Veitch
- Dieffenbachia brittonii Engl.
- Dieffenbachia burgeri Croat & Grayum
- Dieffenbachia cannifolia Engl.
- Dieffenbachia concinna Croat & Grayum
- Dieffenbachia copensis Croat
- Dieffenbachia cordata Engl.
- Dieffenbachia costata Klotzsch ex Schott
- Dieffenbachia crebripistillata Croat
- Dieffenbachia daguensis Engl.
- Dieffenbachia davidsei Croat & Grayum
- Dieffenbachia duidae (Steyerm.) G.S.Bunting
- Dieffenbachia elegans A.M.E.Jonker & Jonker
- Dieffenbachia enderi Engl.
- Dieffenbachia fortunensis Croat
- Dieffenbachia fosteri Croat
- Dieffenbachia fournieri N.E.Br.
- Dieffenbachia galdamesiae Croat
- Dieffenbachia gracilis Huber
- Dieffenbachia grayumiana Croat
- Dieffenbachia hammelii Croat & Grayum
- Dieffenbachia herthae Diels
- Dieffenbachia horichii Croat & Grayum
- Dieffenbachia humilis Poepp.
- Dieffenbachia imperialis Linden & André
- Dieffenbachia isthmia Croat
- Dieffenbachia killipii Croat
- Dieffenbachia lancifolia Linden & André
- Dieffenbachia leopoldii W.Bull
- Dieffenbachia longispatha Engl. & K.Krause
- Dieffenbachia lutheri Croat
- Dieffenbachia macrophylla Poepp.
- Dieffenbachia meleagris L.Linden & Rodigas
- Dieffenbachia mortoniana O.Ortiz & Croat
- Dieffenbachia nitidipetiolata Croat & Grayum
- Dieffenbachia obliqua Poepp.
- Dieffenbachia obscurinervia Croat
- Dieffenbachia oerstedii Schott
- Dieffenbachia olbia L.Linden & Rodigas
- Dieffenbachia paludicola N.E.Br. ex Gleason
- Dieffenbachia panamensis Croat
- Dieffenbachia parlatorei Linden & André
- Dieffenbachia parvifolia Engl.
- Dieffenbachia pittieri Engl. & K.Krause
- Dieffenbachia rodriguezii Croat & O.Ortiz
- Dieffenbachia seguine (Jacq.) Schott
- Dieffenbachia shuttleworthii W.Bull ex T.Moore & Mast.
- Dieffenbachia simoneae C.A.S.Bat.
- Dieffenbachia standleyi Croat
- Dieffenbachia tonduzii Croat & Grayum
- Dieffenbachia weberbaueri Engl.
- Dieffenbachia weirii J.Veitch f.
- Dieffenbachia wendlandii Schott
- Dieffenbachia williamsii Croat
- Dieffenbachia wurdackii Croat

== Ecology ==
In a survey that began in 1998, researchers in Costa Rica noticed that the strawberry poison frog Oophaga pumilio, deposited almost all (89%) of their tadpoles on the leaf axils of Dieffenbachia. As a result, the frog population fluctuated with the abundance of Dieffenbachia, especially in secondary forests . A majority of the plants were eradicated by 2012 when the surveyors returned to the same area, with only 28% of 2002 plant numbers remaining. Researchers concluded that the reason for the rapid decline in Dieffenbachia was due to increased abundance of the collared peccary Dicotyles tajacu in the La Selva Biological Station research area; a small pig-like animal that feeds on Dieffenbachia and other plants.

== Cultivation ==
With a minimum temperature of 5 °C (41 °F), dieffenbachia must be grown indoors in temperate areas. They need light, but filtered sunlight through a window is usually sufficient. They also need moderately moist soil, which should be regularly fertilized with an appropriate houseplant fertilizer. Leaves will periodically roll up and fall off to make way for new leaves. Yellowing of the leaves is generally a sign of problematic conditions, such as a nutrient deficiency in the soil. Dieffenbachia respond well to hot temperatures and dry climates.

Dieffenbachia prefer medium sunlight, moderately dry soil and average home temperatures of 62–80 °F (17–27 °C). Most require water about twice a week.

As Dieffenbachia seguine comes from the tropical rain forest, it prefers to have moisture at its roots, as it grows all the time, it needs constant water, but with loose well aerated soils.

The cultivars 'Camille' and 'Tropic Snow' have gained the Royal Horticultural Society's Award of Garden Merit.

== Toxicity ==
The cells of the Dieffenbachia plant contain needle-shaped calcium oxalate crystals called raphides. If a leaf is chewed, these crystals can cause a temporary burning sensation and erythema. In rare cases, edema of tissues exposed to the plant has been reported. Mastication and ingestion generally result in only mild symptoms. With both children and pets, contact with Dieffenbachia (typically from chewing) can cause a host of unpleasant symptoms, including intense numbing, oral irritation, excessive drooling, and localized swelling. However, these effects are rarely life-threatening. In most cases, symptoms are mild, and can be successfully treated with analgesic agents, antihistamines, or medical charcoal.

Severe cases can occur if Dieffenbachia makes prolonged contact with oral mucosal tissue. In such cases, symptoms generally include severe pain which can last for several days to weeks. Hospitalization may be necessary if prolonged contact is made with the throat, in which severe swelling has the potential to affect breathing.

Gastric evacuation or lavage is seldom indicated. In patients with exposure to toxic plants, 70% are children younger than 5 years.

There are urban legends that Dieffenbachia is a deadly poison, but this is not accurate.

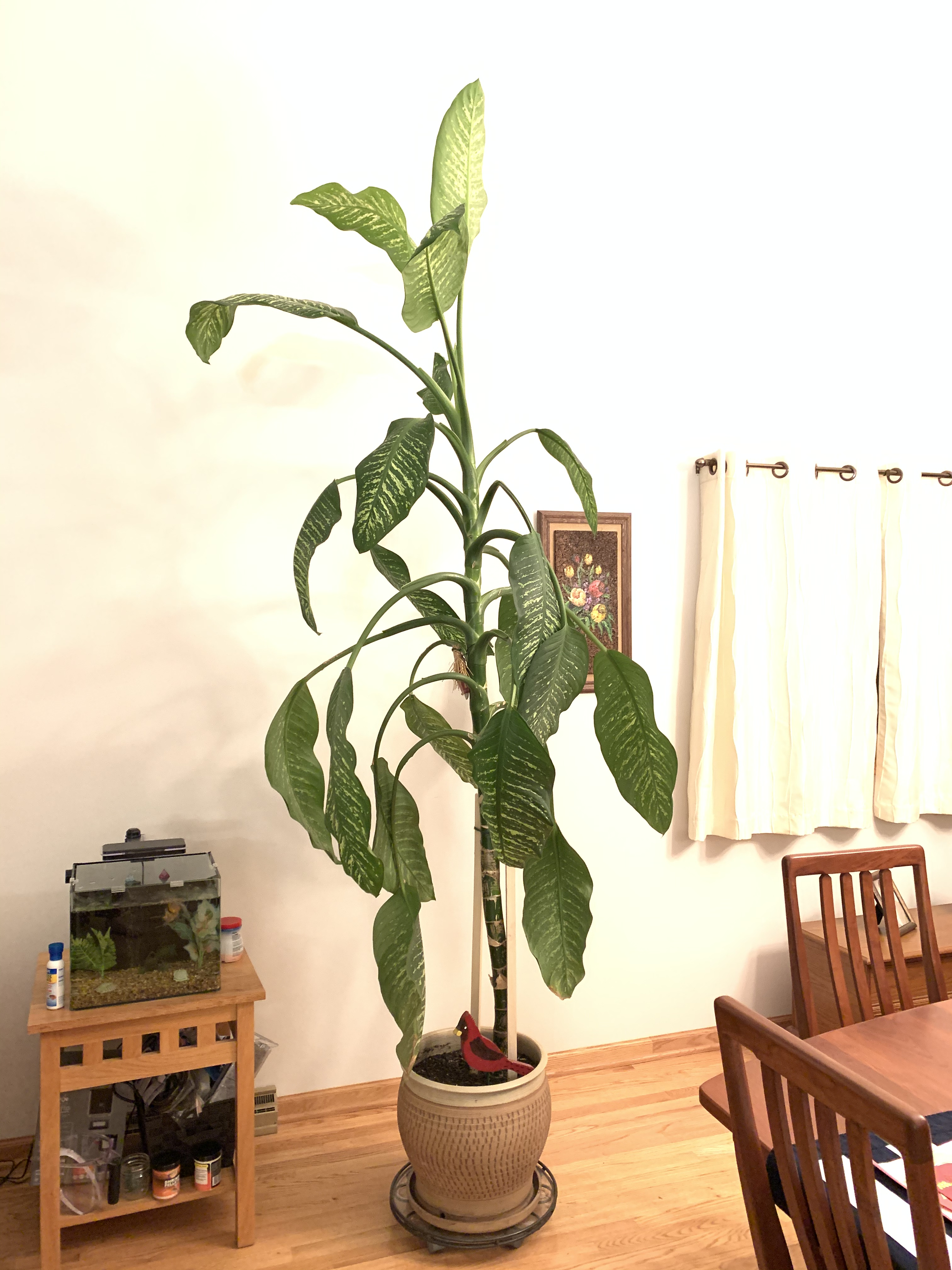
A 47 year old 9.75 foot tall Dieffenbachia house plant

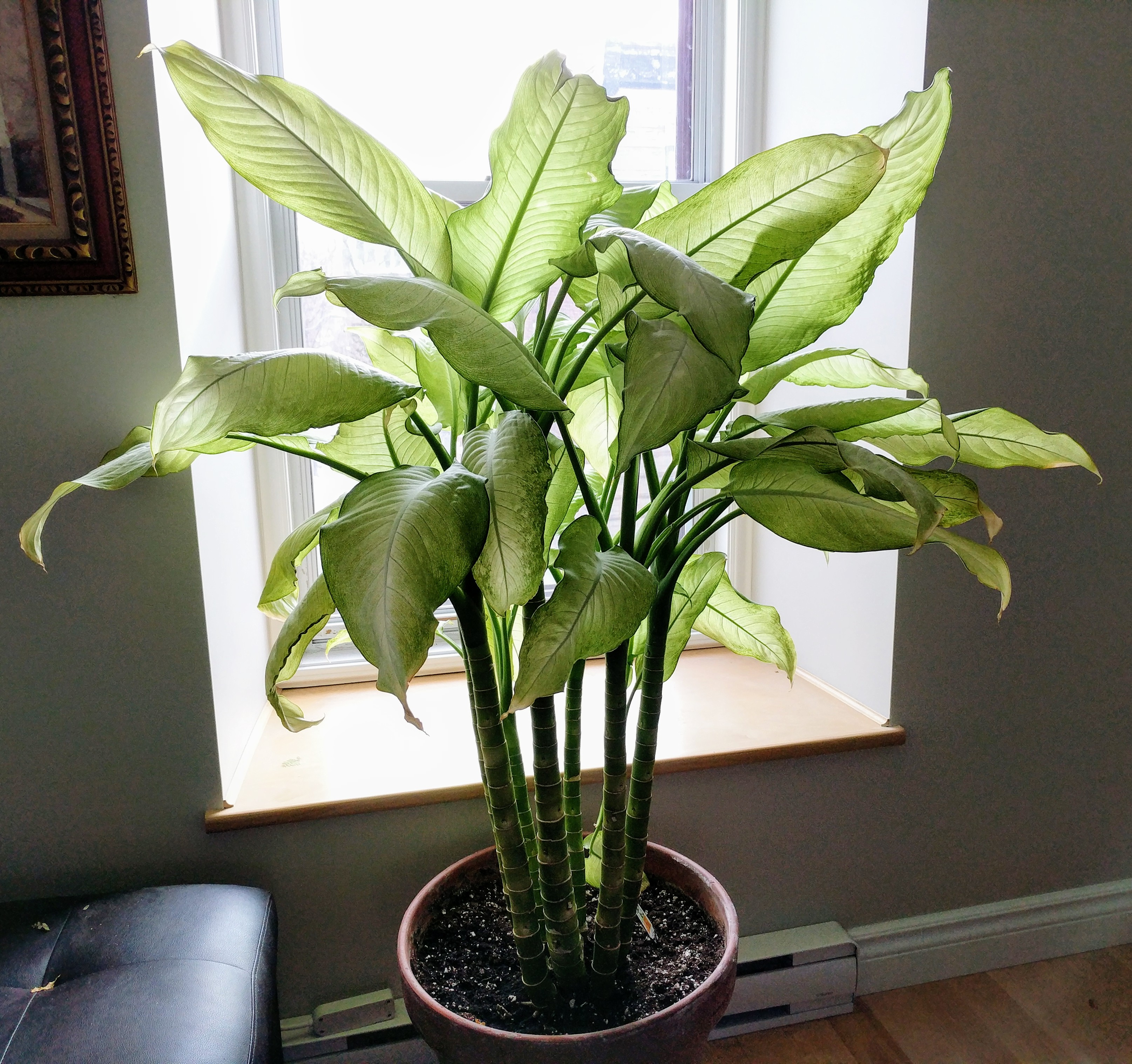
A large dieffenbachia with big bright green leaves on display as a houseplant

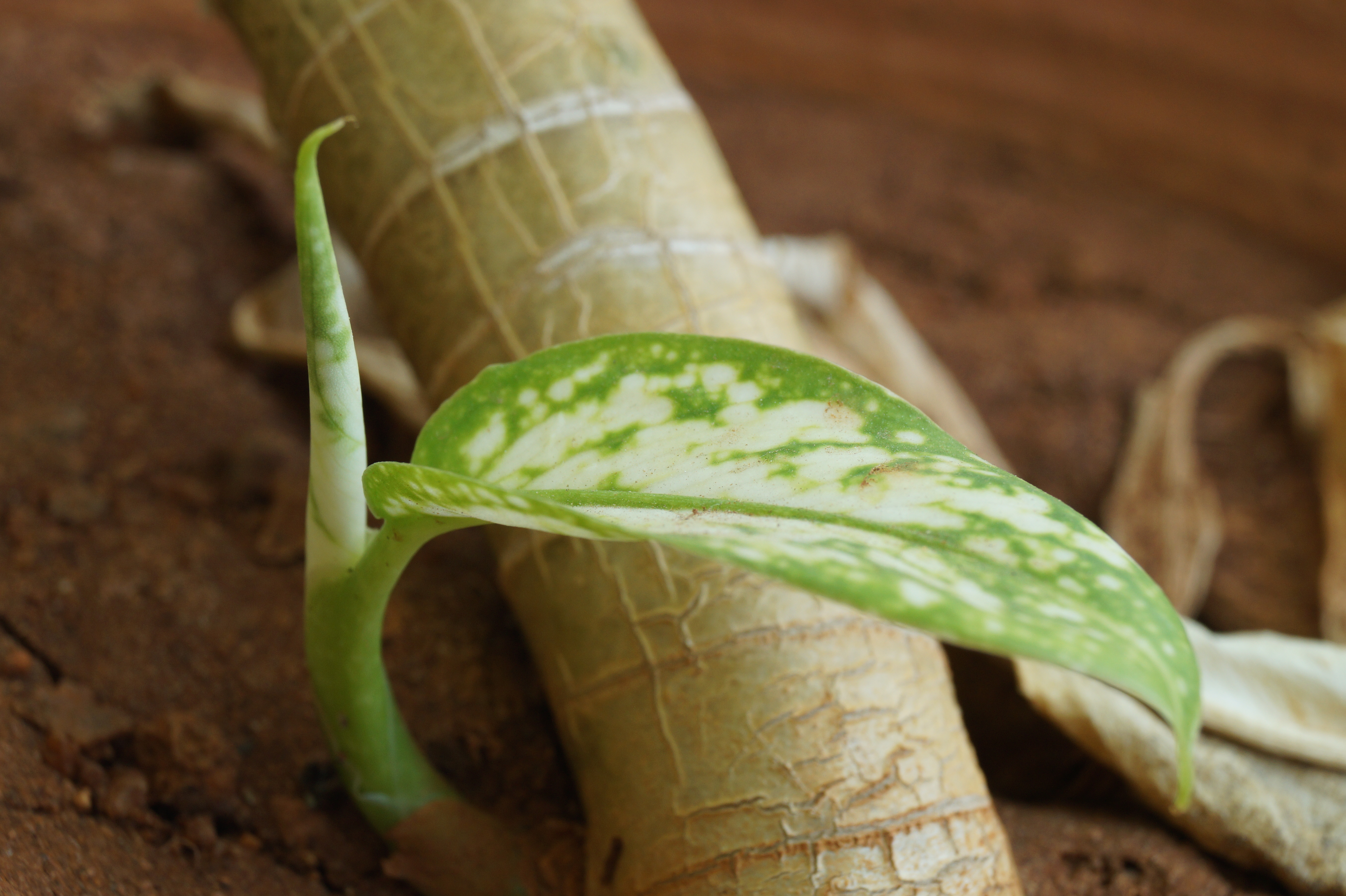
Dieffenbachia shoot

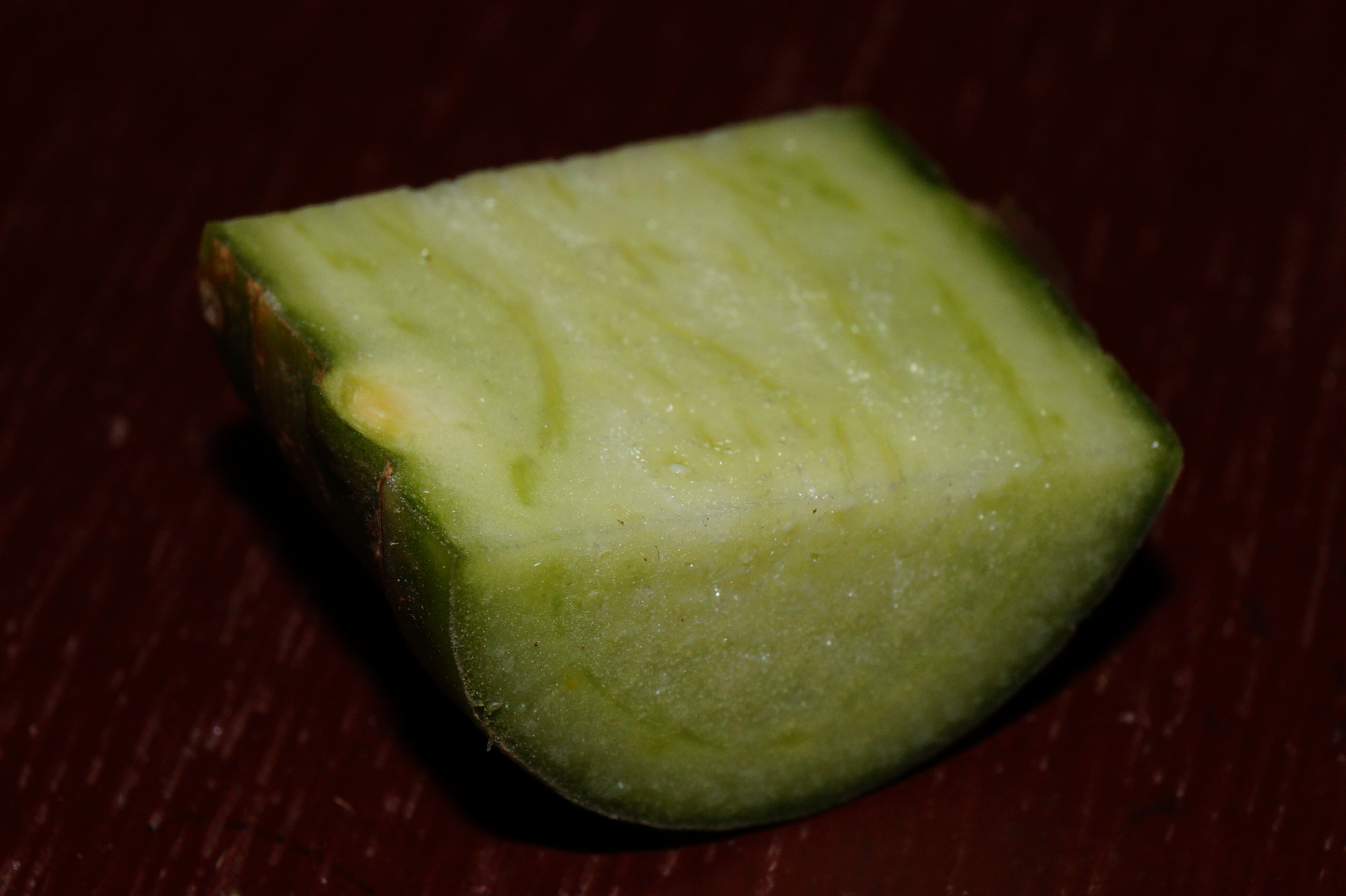
Dieffenbachia crossview

== Sources ==
- Schott, H. W. and Kunst, W. Z. (1829). Für Liebhaber der Botanik.
