= Erioscelis monnei =

Scientific classification
- Kingdom: Animalia
- Phylum: Arthropoda
- Clade: Pancrustacea
- Class: Insecta
- Order: Coleoptera
- Suborder: Polyphaga
- Infraorder: Scarabaeiformia
- Family: Scarabaeidae
- Genus: Erioscelis
- Species: E. monnei

Binomial name
- Erioscelis monnei Amorim, Grossi & Iannuzzi, 2026

Species of beetle

Erioscelis monnei is a species of beetle of the family Scarabaeidae. It is found in Brazil (Minas Gerais).

== Description ==
Adults reach a length of about 21 mm (0.83 in). They have a black to very dark brown body, with a deep red undertone. The dorsal surface is smooth and the micropunctation is sparse and uniformly distributed across the entire body. The remaining punctation is always distinctly ocellated.

== Etymology ==
The species is named in honour of Dr. Miguel Angel Monné Barrio.
