= Erioscelis emarginata =

Scientific classification
- Kingdom: Animalia
- Phylum: Arthropoda
- Clade: Pancrustacea
- Class: Insecta
- Order: Coleoptera
- Suborder: Polyphaga
- Infraorder: Scarabaeiformia
- Family: Scarabaeidae
- Genus: Erioscelis
- Species: E. emarginata

Binomial name
- Erioscelis emarginata (Mannerheim, 1828)

Synonyms
- Apogonia emarginata Mannerheim, 1829; Cyclocephala glabrata Sturm, 1843

Species of beetle

Erioscelis emarginata is a species of beetle of the family Scarabaeidae. It is found in Brazil (Minas Gerais, Espírito Santo, Rio de Janeiro, São Paulo, Paraná, Santa Catarina, Rio Grande do Sul, Federal District), Argentina (Corrientes, Misiones) and Paraguay.

== Description ==
Adults reach a length of about 24 mm (0.94 in). They have a brown to dark brown body, with a reddish undertone. The dorsal surface is smooth and the micropunctation is sparse and uniformly distributed across the entire body. The remaining punctation is always distinctly ocellated.
