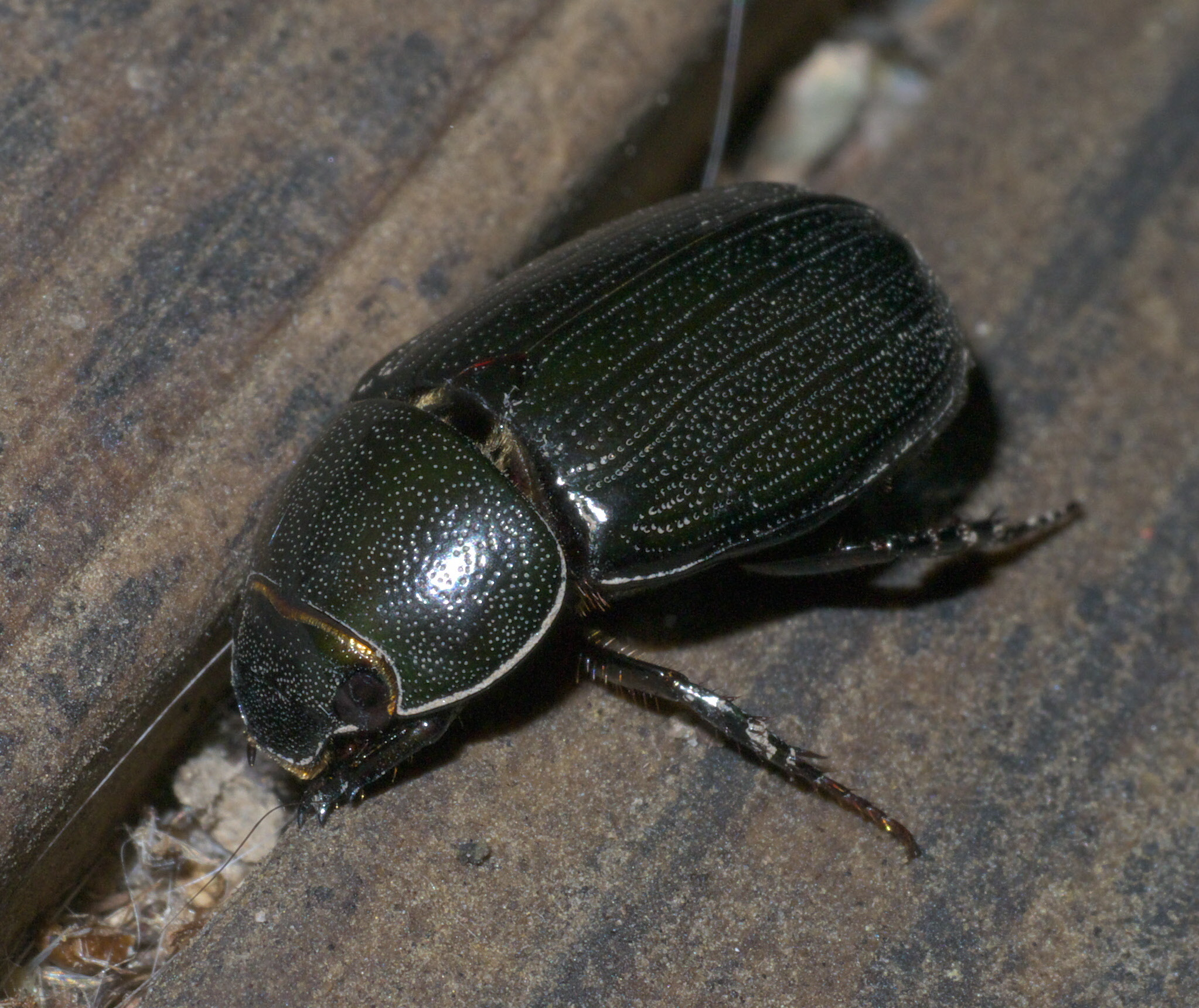
- Dyscinetus morator

Scientific classification
- Domain: Eukaryota
- Kingdom: Animalia
- Phylum: Arthropoda
- Class: Insecta
- Order: Coleoptera
- Suborder: Polyphaga
- Infraorder: Scarabaeiformia
- Family: Scarabaeidae
- Tribe: Cyclocephalini
- Genus: Dyscinetus; Harold, 1869

Synonyms
- Palechus Casey, 1915

= Dyscinetus =

Genus of beetles

Dyscinetus is a genus of rice beetles in the family Scarabaeidae. There are more than 20 described species in Dyscinetus.

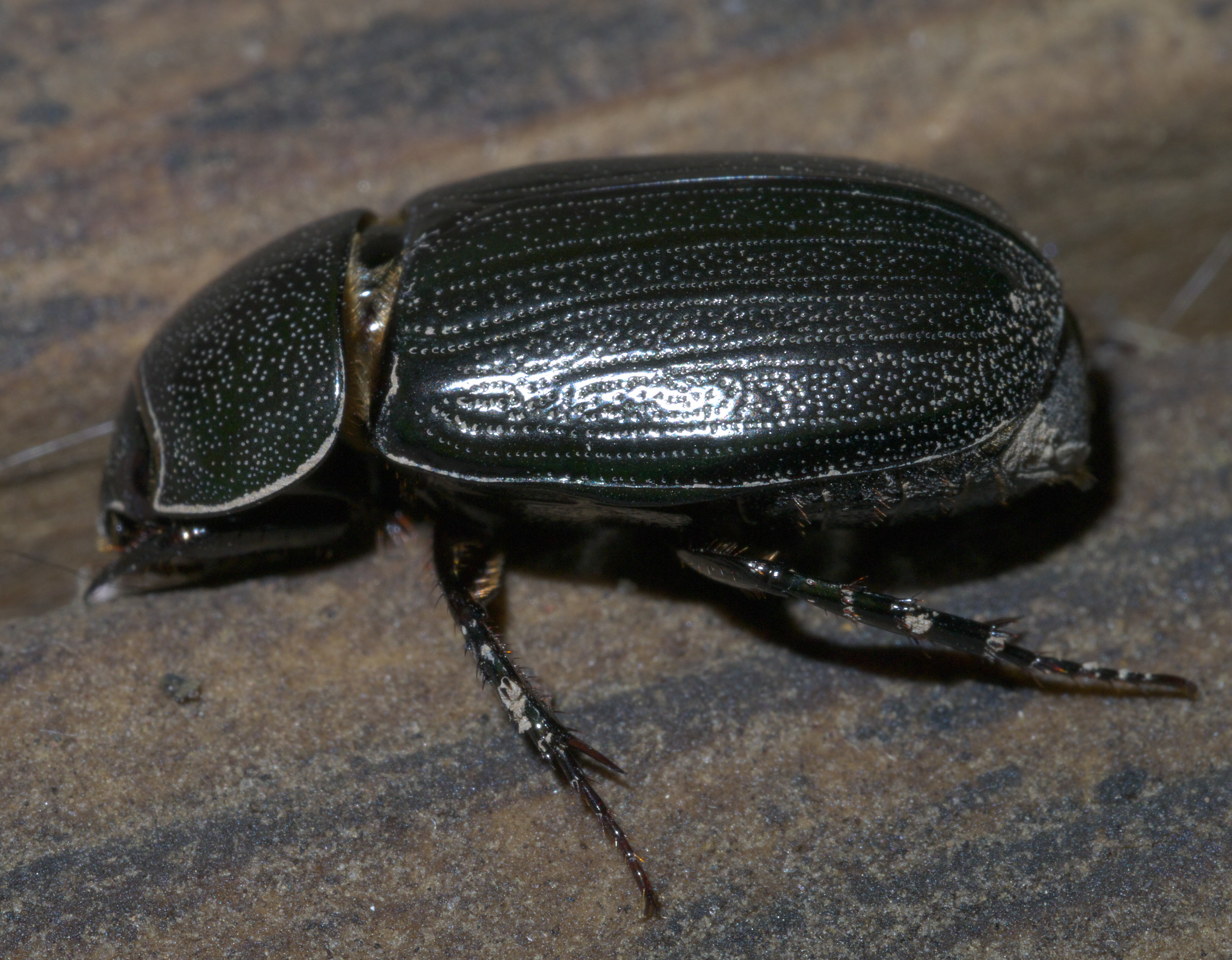
Dyscinetus morator

== Species ==
These 24 species belong to the genus Dyscinetus:

- Dyscinetus australis Joly & Escalona, 2002
- Dyscinetus bitumerosus Casey
- Dyscinetus dubius (Olivier, 1789)
- Dyscinetus dytiscoides Arrow, 1911
- Dyscinetus fimosus (Herbst, 1789)
- Dyscinetus gagates (Burmeister, 1847)
- Dyscinetus hypocrita Martínez
- Dyscinetus imitator Ratcliffe, 1986
- Dyscinetus laevicollis Arrow, 1937
- Dyscinetus laevipunctatus Bates, 1888
- Dyscinetus martinezi Joly & Escalona, 2002
- Dyscinetus mendax Joly & Escalona, 2010
- Dyscinetus minor Chapin, 1935
- Dyscinetus morator (Fabricius, 1798) (rice beetle)
- Dyscinetus olivaceus Höhne, 1923
- Dyscinetus ornaticaudus Ratcliffe, 1986
- Dyscinetus paradytis (Ponchel & Dechambre, 2003)
- Dyscinetus picipes (Burmeister, 1847)
- Dyscinetus plicatus (Burmeister, 1847)
- Dyscinetus questeli Chalumeau, 1982
- Dyscinetus rhomboidalis Casey
- Dyscinetus rugifrons (Burmeister, 1847)
- Dyscinetus sculptus Dupuis, 2006
- Dyscinetus subsericeus (Burmeister, 1847)
