= Ancognatha manca =

Scientific classification
- Domain: Eukaryota
- Kingdom: Animalia
- Phylum: Arthropoda
- Class: Insecta
- Order: Coleoptera
- Suborder: Polyphaga
- Infraorder: Scarabaeiformia
- Family: Scarabaeidae
- Genus: Ancognatha
- Species: A. manca

Binomial name
- Ancognatha manca (LeConte, 1866)

Synonyms
- Ancognatha aequata Bates, 1888; Ancognatha durangoana Casey, 1915; Ancognatha laevigata Bates, 1888; Ancognatha perspicua Casey, 1915; Ancognatha zuniella Casey, 1915

Species of beetle

Ancognatha manca is a species of rhinoceros beetle in the family Scarabaeidae.
