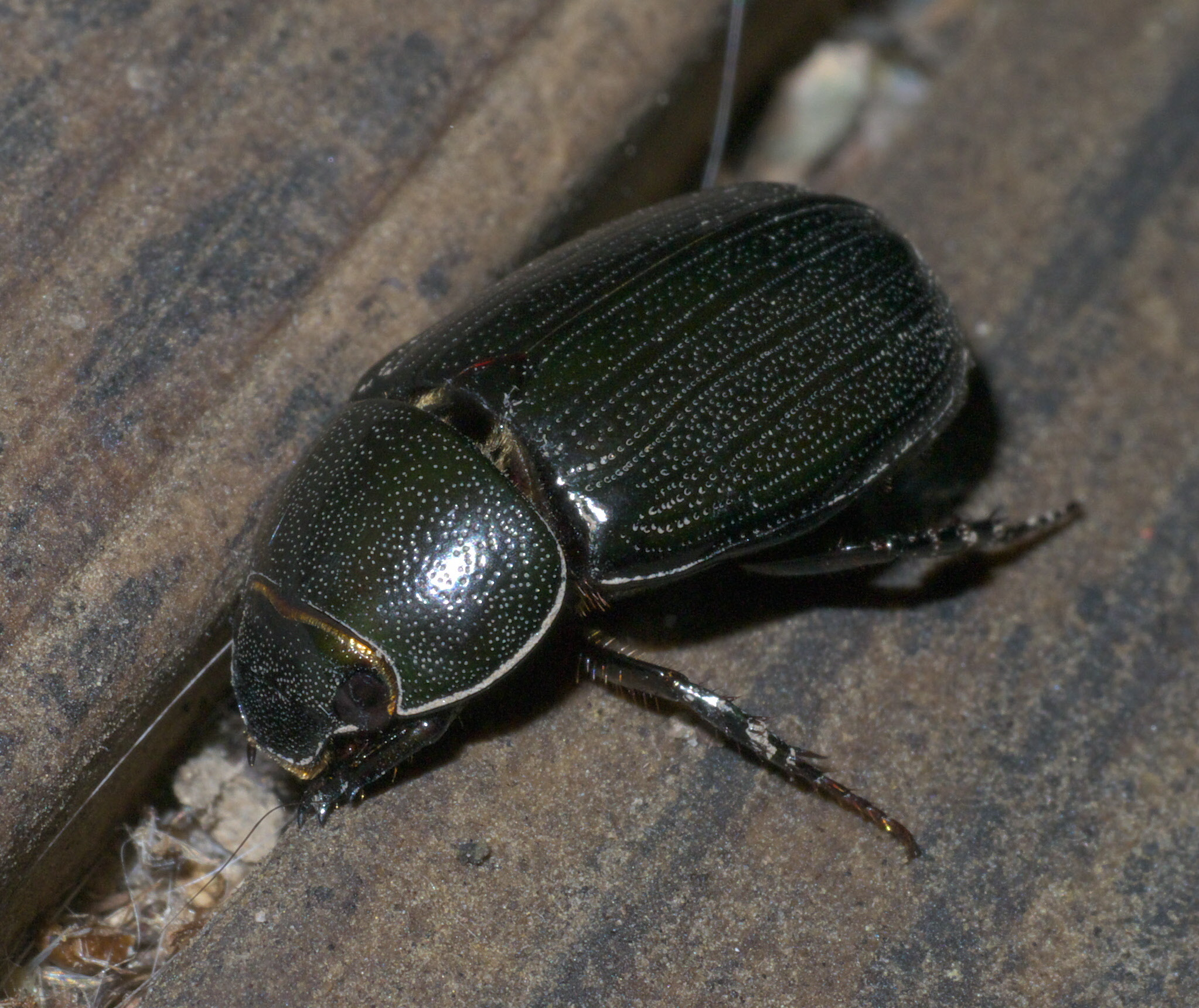

Scientific classification
- Kingdom: Animalia
- Phylum: Arthropoda
- Clade: Pancrustacea
- Class: Insecta
- Order: Coleoptera
- Suborder: Polyphaga
- Infraorder: Scarabaeiformia
- Family: Scarabaeidae
- Genus: Dyscinetus
- Species: D. morator

Binomial name
- Dyscinetus morator (Fabricius, 1798)

Synonyms
- Chalepus trachypygus Burmeister, 1847; Dyscinetus bitumorosus Casey, 1915; Dyscinetus borealis Casey, 1915; Dyscinetus discedens Casey, 1915

= Dyscinetus morator =

Species of beetle

Dyscinetus morator, the rice beetle, is a species of rhinoceros beetle in the family Scarabaeidae.

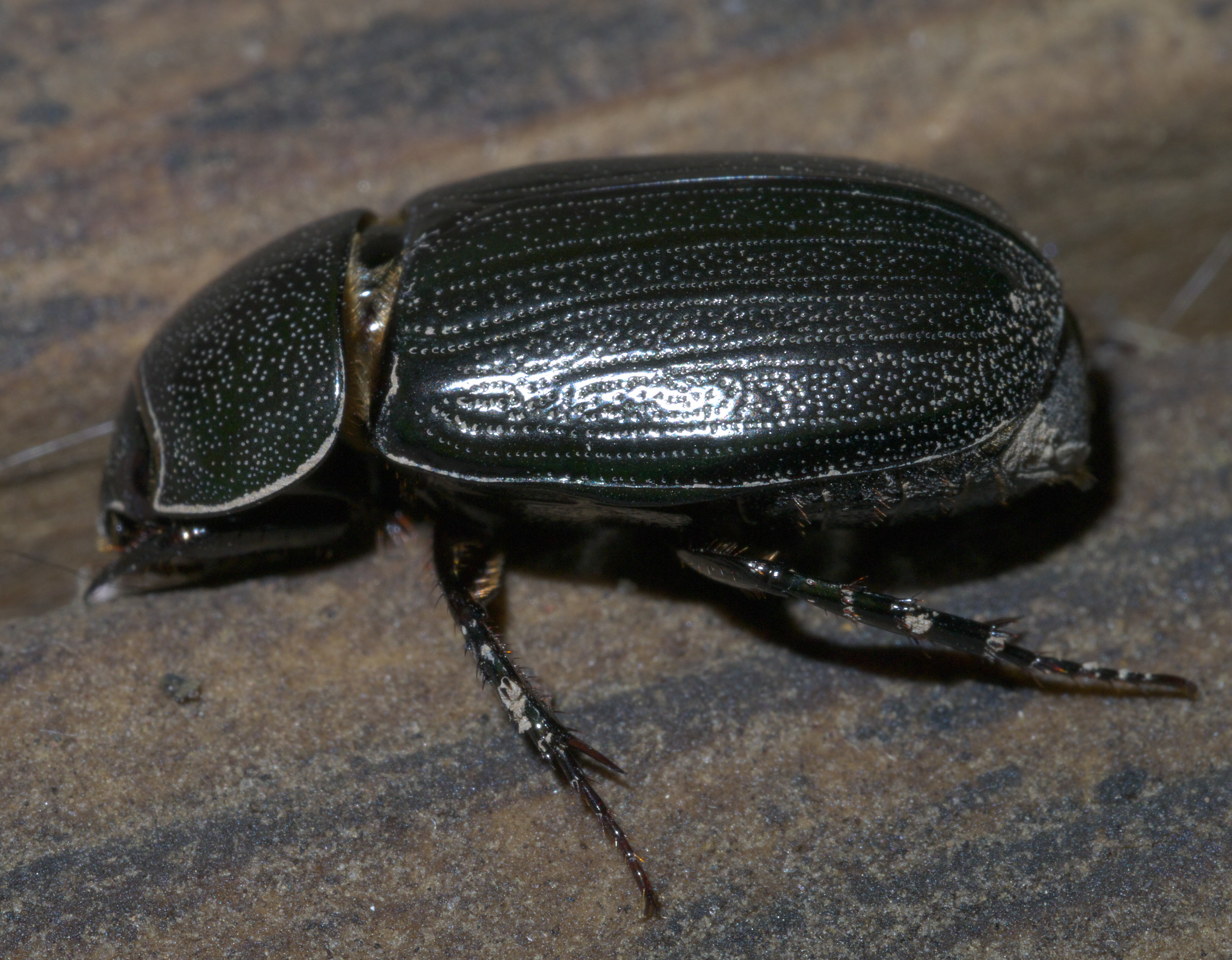
Rice beetle, Dyscinetus morator
