= Erioscelis =

Scientific classification
- Kingdom: Animalia
- Phylum: Arthropoda
- Clade: Pancrustacea
- Class: Insecta
- Order: Coleoptera
- Suborder: Polyphaga
- Infraorder: Scarabaeiformia
- Family: Scarabaeidae
- Subfamily: Dynastinae
- Tribe: Cyclocephalini
- Genus: Erioscelis; Burmeister, 1847

Genus of beetles

Figure 28; Hindwing of Erioscelis emarginata (Mannerheim)

Erioscelis is a genus of beetles of the family Scarabaeidae.

== Species ==
- Erioscelis columbica Endrödi, 1966
- Erioscelis emarginata (Mannerheim, 1828)
- Erioscelis monnei Amorim, Grossi & Iannuzzi, 2026
- Erioscelis peruana Saylor, 1946
- Erioscelis proba (Sharp, 1877)
- Erioscelis sobrina Höhne, 1921
