= Nuphar ozarkana =

Scientific classification
- Kingdom: Plantae
- Clade: Tracheophytes
- Clade: Angiosperms
- Order: Nymphaeales
- Family: Nymphaeaceae
- Genus: Nuphar
- Section: Nuphar sect. Astylus
- Species: N. ozarkana

Binomial name
- Nuphar ozarkana (G.S.Mill. & Standl.) Standl.

Synonyms
- Nuphar advena subsp. ozarkana (G.S.Mill. & Standl.) Padgett; Nuphar lutea subsp. ozarkana (G.S.Mill. & Standl.) Beal; Nymphaea ozarkana G.S.Mill. & Standl.; Nymphozanthus ozarkanus (G.S.Mill. & Standl.) E.J.Palmer & Steyerm.

Species of perennial aquatic plant

Nuphar ozarkana is a species of aquatic plant native to the US-American states Arkansas, Missouri, and Oklahoma.

== Description ==
=== Vegetative characteristics ===
Nuphar ozarkana is an aquatic species with a slender rhizome. The leaves mostly float, but they can also be erect. The petiolate, orbicular to oblong, smooth, glabrous, yellowish green leaves are 12-20 cm long, and 7-19 cm wide. The terete, glabrous petioles are 3-11 mm wide.

=== Generative characteristics ===
The pedunculate, yellow, 30 mm wide flowers have stout, glabrous peduncles. The thin, glabrous sepals are green, but display yellow colouration towards the apex. The smooth, subglobose, 15-25 mm long, and 14-20 mm wide fruit bears 15-30 ovoid, shiny, pale brown 5 mm long, and 3.5 mm wide seeds. The flowers are not fragrant.

== Reproduction ==
=== Generative reproduction ===
This species has an outstandingly low number of seeds per fruit.

== Taxonomy ==
=== Publication ===
It was first described as Nymphaea ozarkana G.S.Mill. & Standl. by Gerrit Smith Miller Jr. and Paul Carpenter Standley in 1912. Later, it was included in the genus Nuphar Sm. as Nuphar ozarkana (G.S.Mill. & Standl.) Standl. published by Paul Carpenter Standley in 1931.

=== Type specimen ===
The type specimen was collected by Otto M. Smith along White River in Southern Missouri in August 1910.

== Etymology ==
The specific epithet ozarkana references the Ozarks region.

== Ecology ==
=== Pollination ===
The three most important pollinators of Nuphar ozarkana

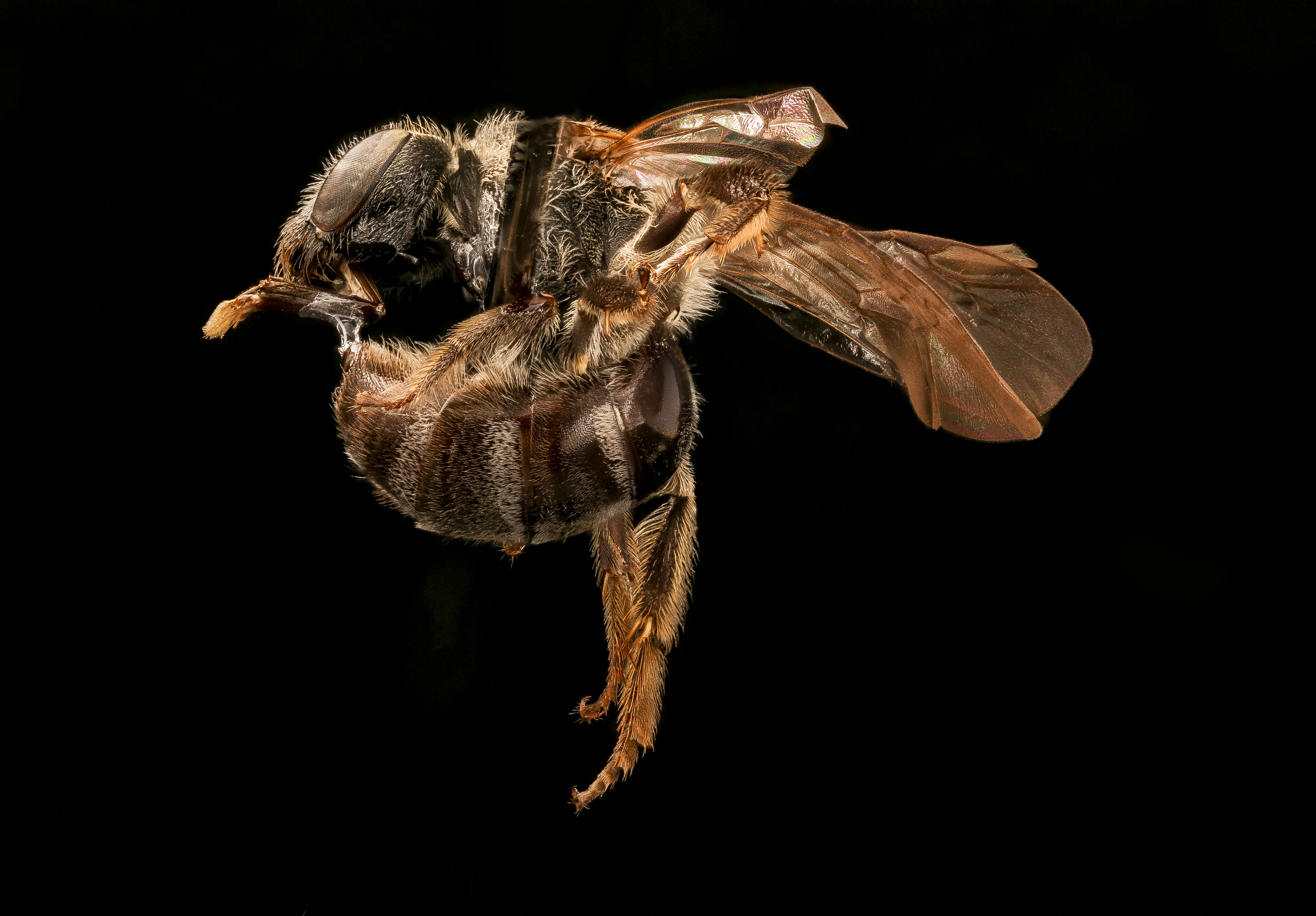
Lasioglossum nelumbonis

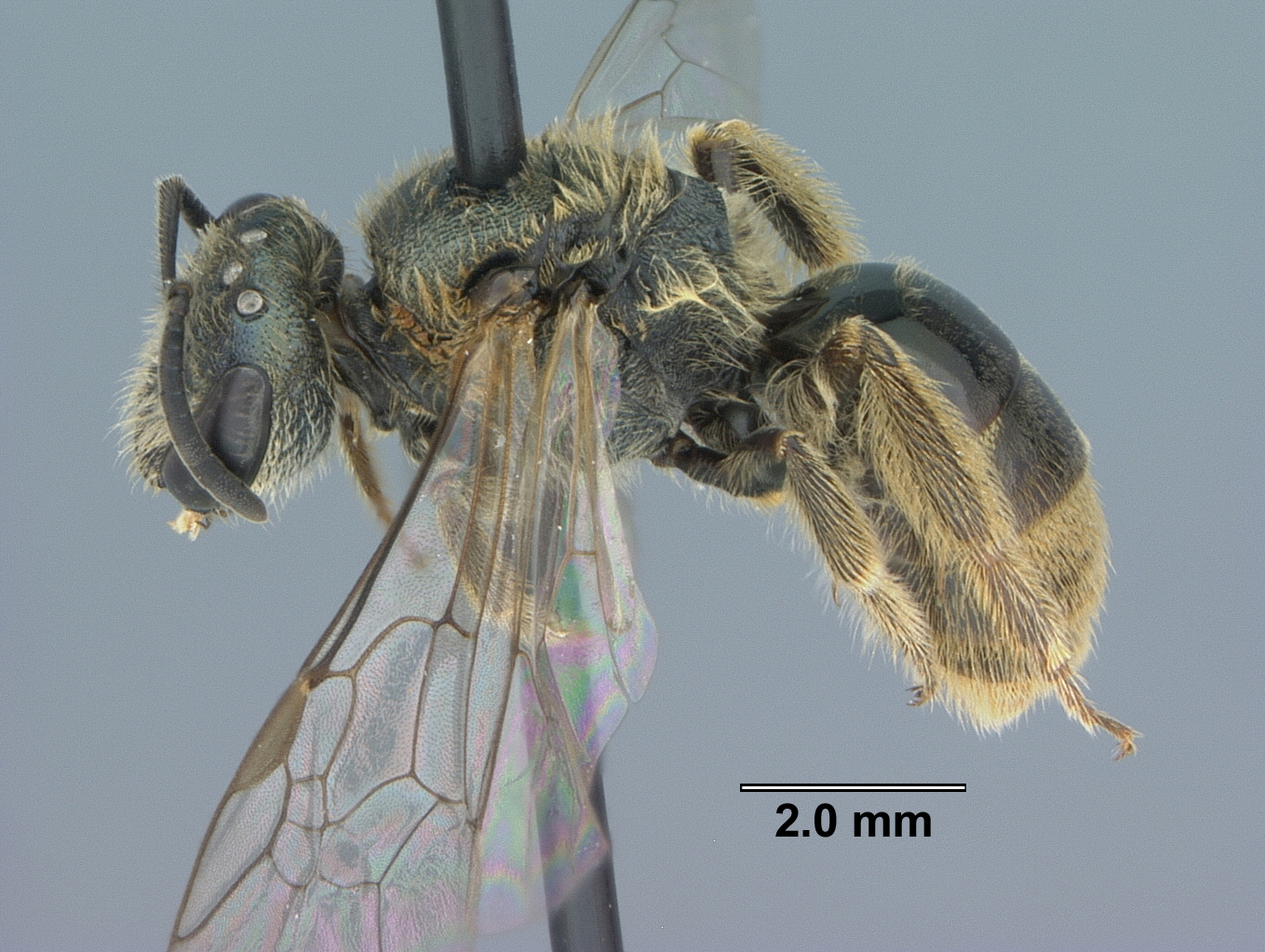
Lasioglossum bruneri

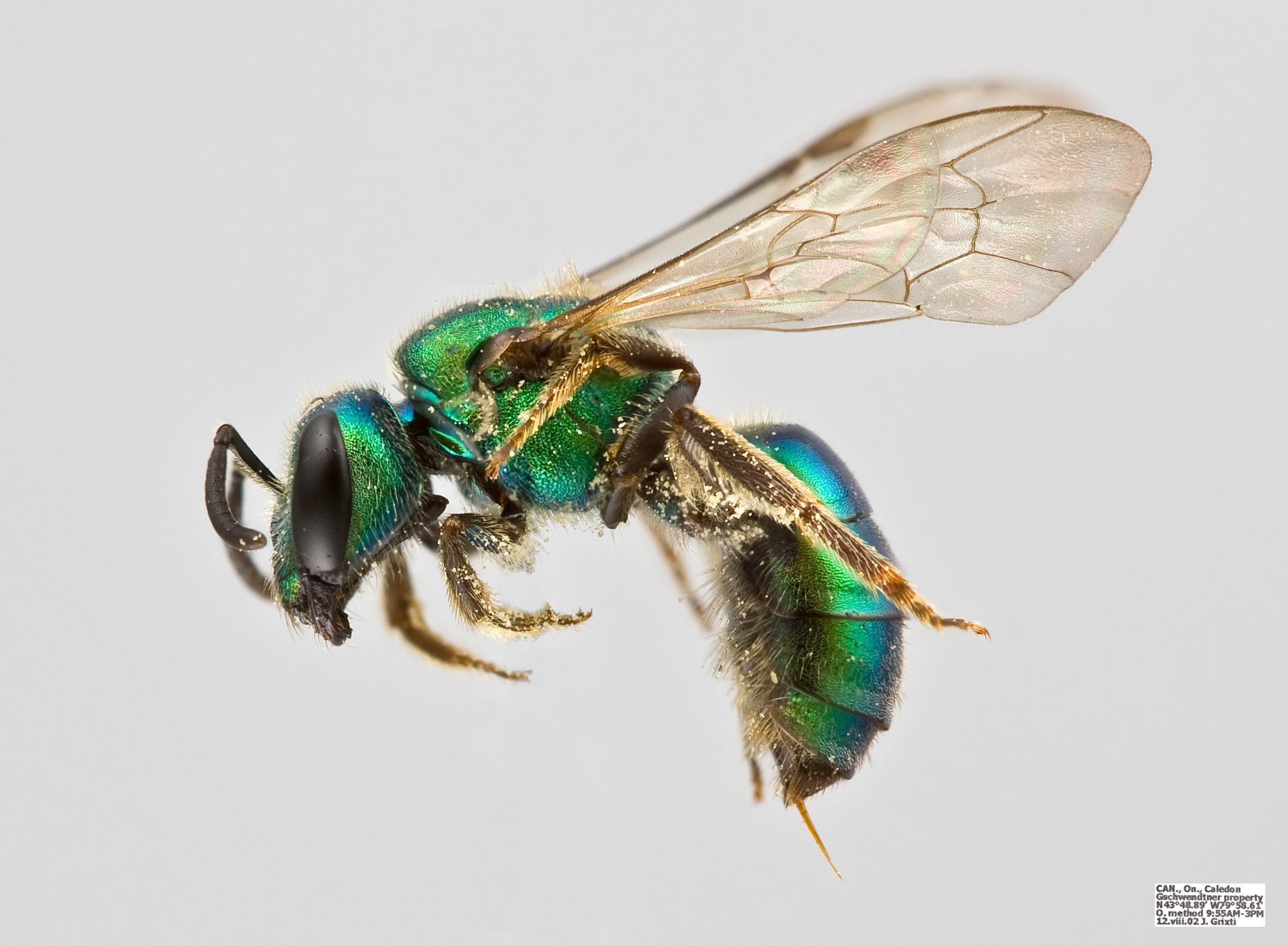
Augochlora pura

It is pollinated by Lasioglossum nelumbonis, Lasioglossum bruneri, and Augochlora pura, which together make up 97% of all floral visitors.
