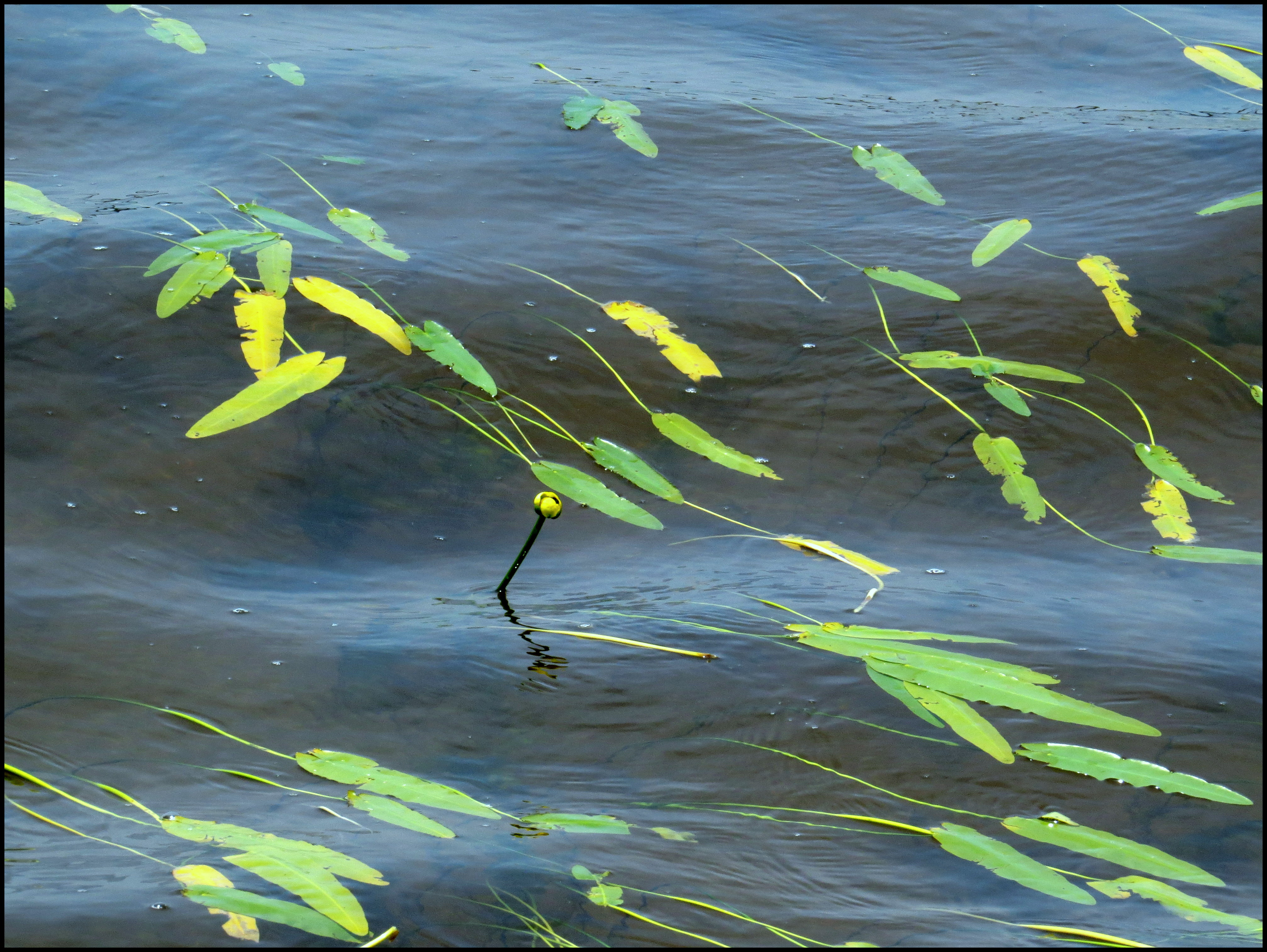

Conservation status
- Imperiled (NatureServe)

Scientific classification
- Kingdom: Plantae
- Clade: Tracheophytes
- Clade: Angiosperms
- Order: Nymphaeales
- Family: Nymphaeaceae
- Genus: Nuphar
- Section: Nuphar sect. Astylus
- Species: N. sagittifolia

Binomial name
- Nuphar sagittifolia (Walter) Pursh

Synonyms
- List: Nuphar lutea subsp. sagittifolia (Walter) Beal; Nymphaea sagittifolia Walter; Nymphozanthus sagittifolius (Walter) Fernald; Ropalon sagittatum (Walter) Raf.; Nuphar longifolia Sm.; Nymphaea hastata Michx. ex DC.; Nymphaea longifolia Michx.; Nymphaea sagittata Pers.

= Nuphar sagittifolia =

Species of aquatic plant

Nuphar sagittifolia, also known as Arrowleaf Pond-lily, Cape Fear spatterdock, or Narrow-leaved Spatterdock, is a perennial, rhizomatous, aquatic herb in the family Nymphaeaceae with unique narrowly lanceolate leaves known only from North Carolina, South Carolina, and Virginia.

== Description ==
=== Vegetative characteristics ===
Nuphar sagittifolia is a perennial, rhizomatous, aquatic, heterophyllous herb with 2–2.5 cm wide rhizomes. Both floating and submerged leaves are present, but submerged leaves are more common. The crisped, membranous submerged leaves are larger than the floating leaves. The glabrous, green, linear to lanceolate floating leaf is 15–30(–50) cm long, and 5–10(–11.5) cm wide. The subterete petiole is 1.5–7 mm wide.

=== Generative characteristics ===
The yellow, 2-3 cm wide flower has a glabrous, 3–8 mm wide peduncle. The flower has 6 sepals. The yellow petals are thick and oblong. The gynoecium consists of 11–15 carpels. The almost entire, green, 14–18 mm wide stigmatic disk has 11–15 stigmatic rays. The ovoid, green, 3–3.5 cm long, and 2–3 cm wide fruit bears 4–5 mm long, and 3 mm wide seeds. Flowering and fruiting occurs from April to October.

== Taxonomy ==
It was first published as Nymphaea sagittifolia Walter by Thomas Walter in 1788. It was placed into the genus Nuphar Sm. as Nuphar sagittifolia (Walter) Pursh published by Frederick Traugott Pursh in 1813. It is placed in the section Nuphar sect. Astylus.

=== Etymology ===
The specific epithet sagittifolia means having arrow-shaped leaves.

== Habitat ==
It is aquatic, found in lakes, ponds, and slow-moving rivers in the coastal plains in up to 2.1 m deep, acidic water.

== Conservation ==
The NatureServe conservation status is T2 Imperiled. In Virginia, it is threatened. In North Carolina, it is placed on the Rare Plant Watch List. In South Carolina, it is also placed on the list of rare species.
