= Nuphar orbiculata =

Conservation status
- Vulnerable (NatureServe)

Scientific classification
- Kingdom: Plantae
- Clade: Tracheophytes
- Clade: Angiosperms
- Order: Nymphaeales
- Family: Nymphaeaceae
- Genus: Nuphar
- Section: Nuphar sect. Astylus
- Species: N. orbiculata

Binomial name
- Nuphar orbiculata (Small) Standl.

Synonyms
- Nuphar advena subsp. orbiculata (Small) Padgett; Nuphar lutea subsp. orbiculata (Small) Beal; Nymphaea orbiculata Small; Nymphozanthus orbiculatus (Small) Fernald; Nuphar bombycina (G.S.Mill. & Standl.) Standl.; Nymphaea bombycina G.S.Mill. & Standl.; Nymphozanthus bombycinus (G.S.Mill. & Standl.) Fernald

Species of perennial aquatic plant

Nuphar orbiculata is a species of rhizomatous aquatic plant native to the US-American states Alabama, Florida, and Georgia.

== Description ==
=== Vegetative characteristics ===
Nuphar orbiculata is a herbaceous, perennial, aquatic plant. The rhizomes are 7-8 cm wide. The petiolate, bright green, orbicular leaves are 20-45 cm long, and 20-45 cm wide. The abaxial surface is pubescent. The petioles are pubescent.

=== Generative characteristics ===
The flowers are 6 cm wide. The oblong-obovate sepals are 5 cm long. The stigmatic disk is 2 cm wide. The subglobose, 4-5 cm wide fruit bears ovoid, 4.5 mm long, ridged seeds.

== Reproduction ==
=== Generative reproduction ===
Flowering and fruiting occurs in July.

== Taxonomy ==
=== Publication ===
It was first described as Nymphaea orbiculata Small by John Kunkel Small in 1896. Later, it was included in the genus Nuphar Sm. as Nuphar orbiculata (Small) Standl. published by Paul Carpenter Standley in 1931.

== Etymology ==
The specific epithet orbiculata means round or disc-shaped.

== Conservation ==
The NatureServe conservation status is T3 Vulnerable.

== Ecology ==
=== Habitat ===
It occurs in stagnant waters of blackwater rivers, streams, lakes, and acidic lime sink ponds.
