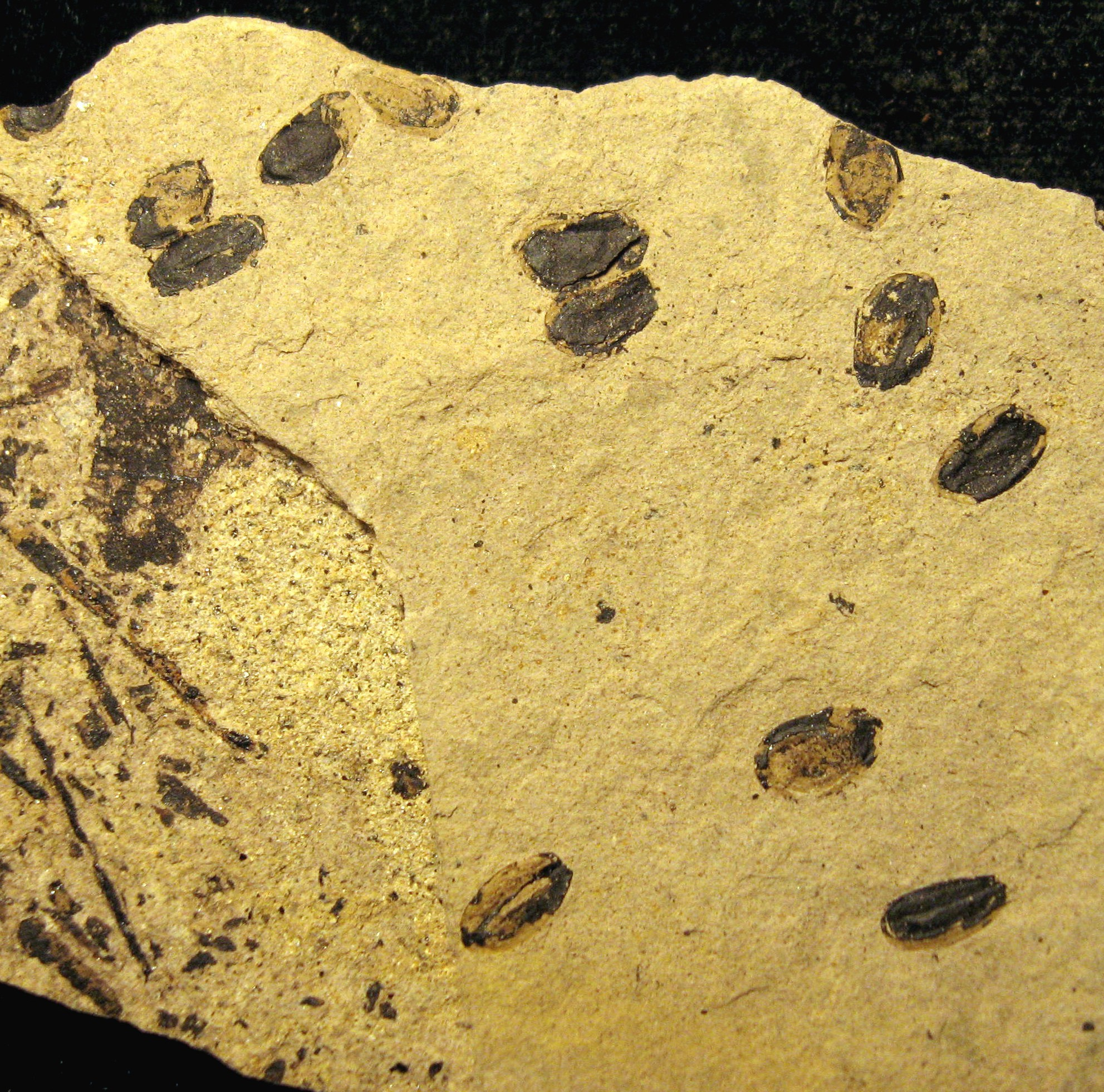
- Nuphar carlquistii seeds

Scientific classification
- Kingdom: Plantae
- Clade: Tracheophytes
- Clade: Angiosperms
- Order: Nymphaeales
- Family: Nymphaeaceae
- Genus: Nuphar
- Section: Nuphar sect. Astylus
- Species: N. carlquistii

Binomial name
- Nuphar carlquistii DeVore, Taylor, & Pigg

= Nuphar carlquistii =

Nuphar carlquistii Temporal range: Ypresian

Extinct species of flowering plant

Nuphar carlquistii is an extinct species of flowering plant in the family Nymphaeaceae related to the modern spatterdock, Nuphar advena. The species is known from fossil seeds and fruits found in the early Eocene Okanagan Highlands deposits of northern Washington state and British Columbia, Canada.

== History and classification ==
Nuphar carlquistii fossils have been identified from two locations in Western North America, the 49 million year old Klondike Mountain Formation near Republic, Washington and at the Thomas Ranch locality near Princeton, British Columbia. Permineralized seeds identified as the extinct Nymphaeaceae genus Allenbya has been identified from the related Okanagan Highlands Princeton chert site in south central British Columbia.

Ages for the Okanagan Highland locations are, in general, Early Eocene, with the sites that have current uranium-lead or argon–argon radiometric dates being of Ypresian age, while the undated sites or those given older dates being possibly slightly younger and Lutetian in age.

The specimens were studied by paleobotanists Melanie DeVore, Witt Taylor, and Kathleen Pigg with the type description for N. carlquistii being published in a 2015 International Journal of Plant Sciences article. They chose the specific epithet carlquistii, in honor of Sherwin Carlquist in recognition of the work he had done with Nymphaeaceae anatomy and with plant biology. In the type description, the species name was applied to fruits and seeds specifically, while fossils of associated but not attached tepals, stigmatic disks and rhizome sections were discussed as Nuphar cf carlquistii. One of the rhizome segments, UWBM 57225A showing root attachment points, had previously been published with an informal identification as banana fruit of the genus Ensete. The specimen was figured in a 1996 article with a caption of "Ensete sp. fruits with seeds, UWBM 57225A, loc. A0307" though no discussion of the fossil was made in the article text. The fossils display a combination of features, such as a barrel shaped fruit that has vertical furrows, with the stigmatic disk being occasionally to fully crenulated, that are seen in Nuphar Section Astylus, and are noted to be quite similar to the living Nuphar advena.

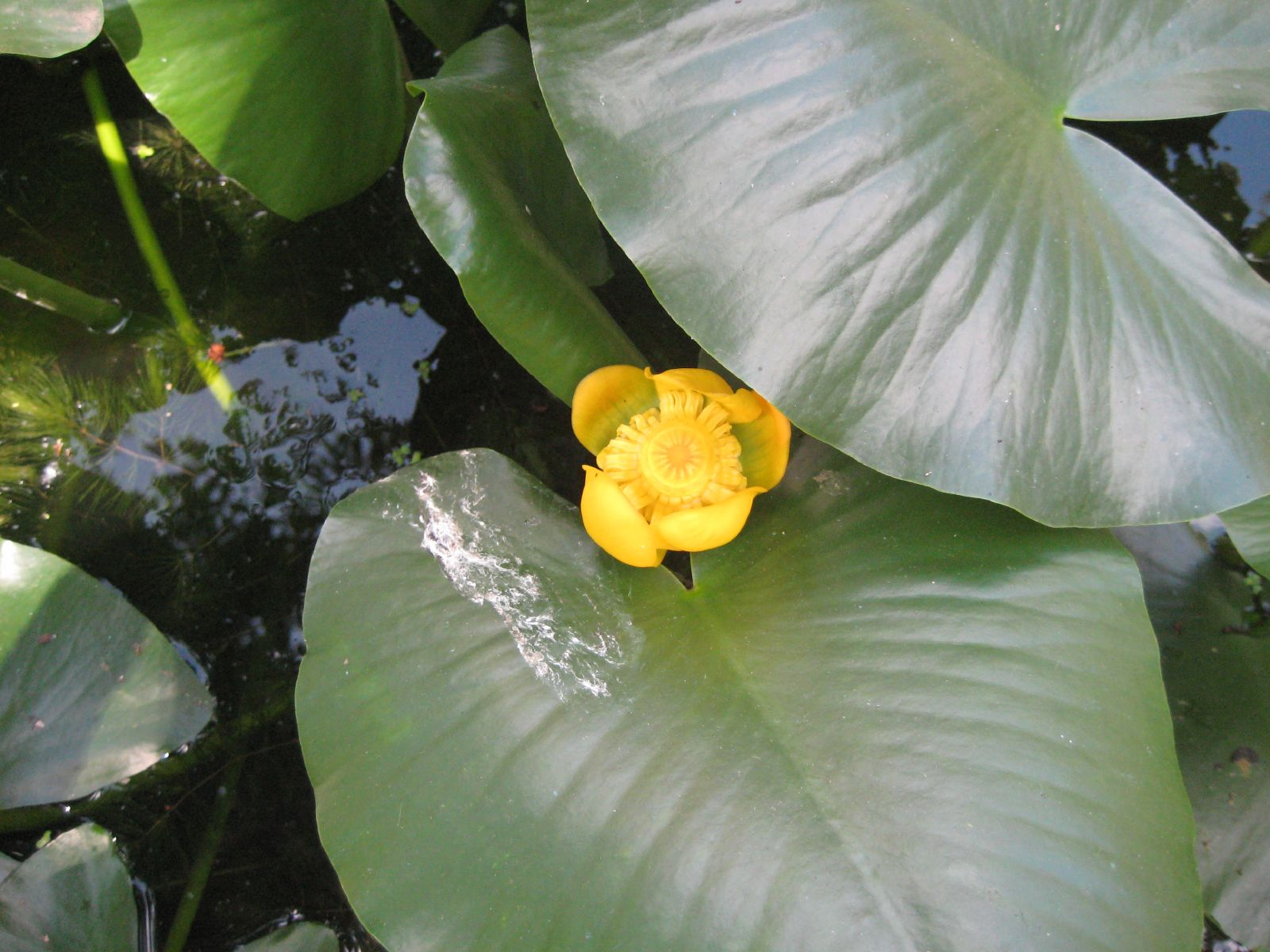
Nuphar advena flower and leaves

== Description ==
The fruits are between 2.5 cm (0.98 in) and 3 cm (1.2 in) across, expanding up from a 2 cm (0.79 in) base. The fruits have a grouping of five persistent tepals that surround the fruit and which have groupings of sclereids that vary in size. One specimen has at least sixteen stamens that were preserved compressed against the tepals, while another shows approximately ten seeds in growth position in the fruit.

Seeds are also found preserved individually and as groupings or masses of seeds ranging between 3.8 cm × 2 cm (1.50 in × 0.79 in) and 6.4 cm × 4.8 cm (2.5 in × 1.9 in). One of the specimens has several hundred seeds grouped closely together and enclosed in a thick matrix, thought to be the preserved jelly like matrix that the seeds first dispersed from the fruit in. Other masses show lesser amounts of matrix, and the ones showing little to no matrix are less grouped together. The individual seeds range between 4–5 mm (0.16–0.20 in) long with an oval to barrel shape and an operculum at one end. Each seed has a distinct raphe ridge running vertically down it from the base to the slightly asymmetrical operculum. While most of the seed coat structure is not preserved enough to identify, the outer cell layer is distinct, showing small pentagon shaped cells with straight walls, a feature seen in fossil and living Nuphar.
