= Nuphar ulvacea =

Conservation status
- Imperiled (NatureServe)

Scientific classification
- Kingdom: Plantae
- Clade: Tracheophytes
- Clade: Angiosperms
- Order: Nymphaeales
- Family: Nymphaeaceae
- Genus: Nuphar
- Section: Nuphar sect. Astylus
- Species: N. ulvacea

Binomial name
- Nuphar ulvacea (G.S.Mill. & Standl.) Standl.

Synonyms
- Nuphar advena subsp. ulvacea (G.S.Mill. & Standl.) Padgett; Nuphar lutea subsp. ulvacea (G.S.Mill. & Standl.) Beal; Nymphaea ulvacea G.S.Mill. & Standl.

Species of perennial aquatic plant

Nuphar ulvacea is a species of rhizomatous aquatic plant native to the US-American states Alabama and Florida.

== Description ==
=== Vegetative characteristics ===
Nuphar ulvacea is an aquatic plant with stout, 2-5 cm wide rhizomes with 11-13 mm long, and 8-9 mm wide leaf scars. The petiolate, lanceolate, glabrous floating leaves with a blunt apex are 115-165 mm long, and 54-66 mm wide. The glabrous, terete, smooth petiole is 45-70 cm long, and 7 mm wide. The very thin submerged leaves are 23-28 cm long, and 7-10 wide.

=== Generative characteristics ===
The flowers, supported by long peduncles, extend above the water surface. They are 15-18 mm long, and 20-23 mm wide. They have six sepals. The subglobose, prominently ribbed fruit bears 3.5-4 mm long, and 2.5 mm wide seeds.

== Reproduction ==
=== Generative reproduction ===
Flowering occurs from Spring to early Autumn.

== Taxonomy ==
=== Publication ===
It was first described as Nymphaea ulvacea G.S.Mill. & Standl. by Gerrit Smith Miller Jr. and Paul Carpenter Standley in 1912. Later, it was included in the genus Nuphar Sm. as Nuphar ulvacea (G.S.Mill. & Standl.) Standl. published by Paul Carpenter Standley in 1931.

=== Type specimen ===
The type specimen was collected by A. H. Curtiss in a blackwater River near Milton, Florida, USA on the 14th of May 1898.

== Etymology ==
The specific epithet ulvacea references the genus of algae Ulva, as the submerged leaves of Nuphar ulvacea resemble it.

== Conservation ==
The NatureServe conservation status is T2 Imperiled and its habitat is imperiled.

== Ecology ==
=== Habitat ===
It occurs in blackwater habitats, streams fed by springs, and old, water-filled sand and gravel pits.
