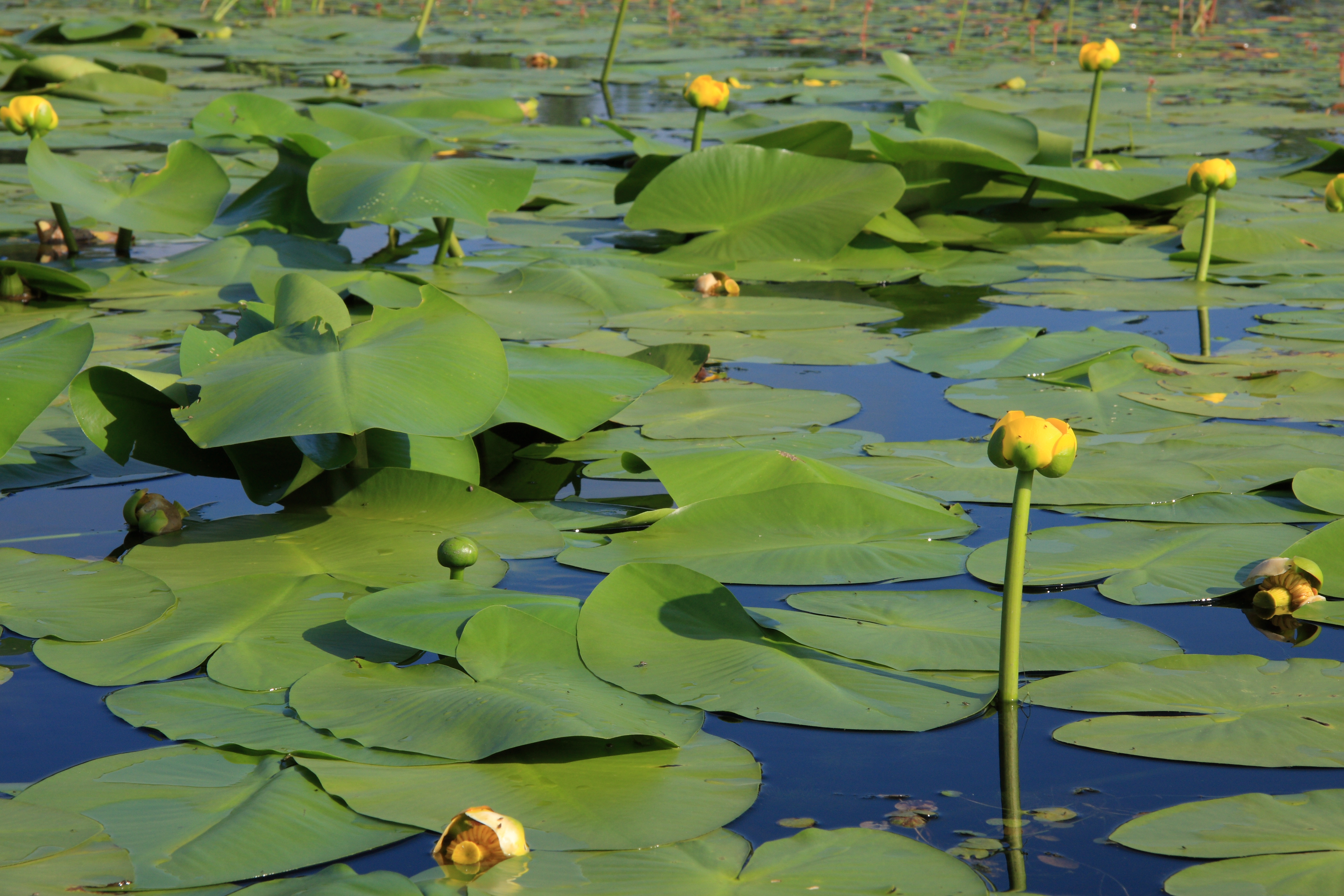
- Nuphar variegata in its natural habitat in Plaisance National Park, Quebec, Canada

Conservation status
- Secure (NatureServe)

Scientific classification
- Kingdom: Plantae
- Clade: Tracheophytes
- Clade: Angiosperms
- Order: Nymphaeales
- Family: Nymphaeaceae
- Genus: Nuphar
- Section: Nuphar sect. Astylus
- Species: N. variegata

Binomial name
- Nuphar variegata Engelm. ex Durand

Synonyms
- List: Nuphar advena var. variegata (Engelm. ex Durand) Engelm.; Nuphar advena subsp. variegata (Engelm. ex Durand) R.T.Clausen; Nuphar lutea subsp. variegata (Engelm. ex Durand) Beal; Nymphaea advena var. variegata (Engelm. ex Durand) Fernald; Nymphaea variegata (Engelm. ex Durand) G.S.Mill.; Nymphozanthus variegatus (Engelm. ex Durand) Fernald; Nuphar americana Prov.; Nuphar fraterna (G.S.Mill. & Standl.) Standl.; Nuphar variegata f. lutescens (Farw.) E.G.Voss; Nymphaea americana (Prov.) G.S.Mill. & Standl.; Nymphaea fraterna G.S.Mill. & Standl.; Nymphozanthus variegatus var. lutescens Farw.

= Nuphar variegata =

Variegated pond-lily

Species of aquatic plant

Nuphar variegata (variegated pond-lily, bullhead pond-lily or yellow pond-lily) is rhizomatous, perennial, aquatic herb in the water lily family Nymphaeaceae native to much of Canada and the northernmost of the United States.

== Description ==
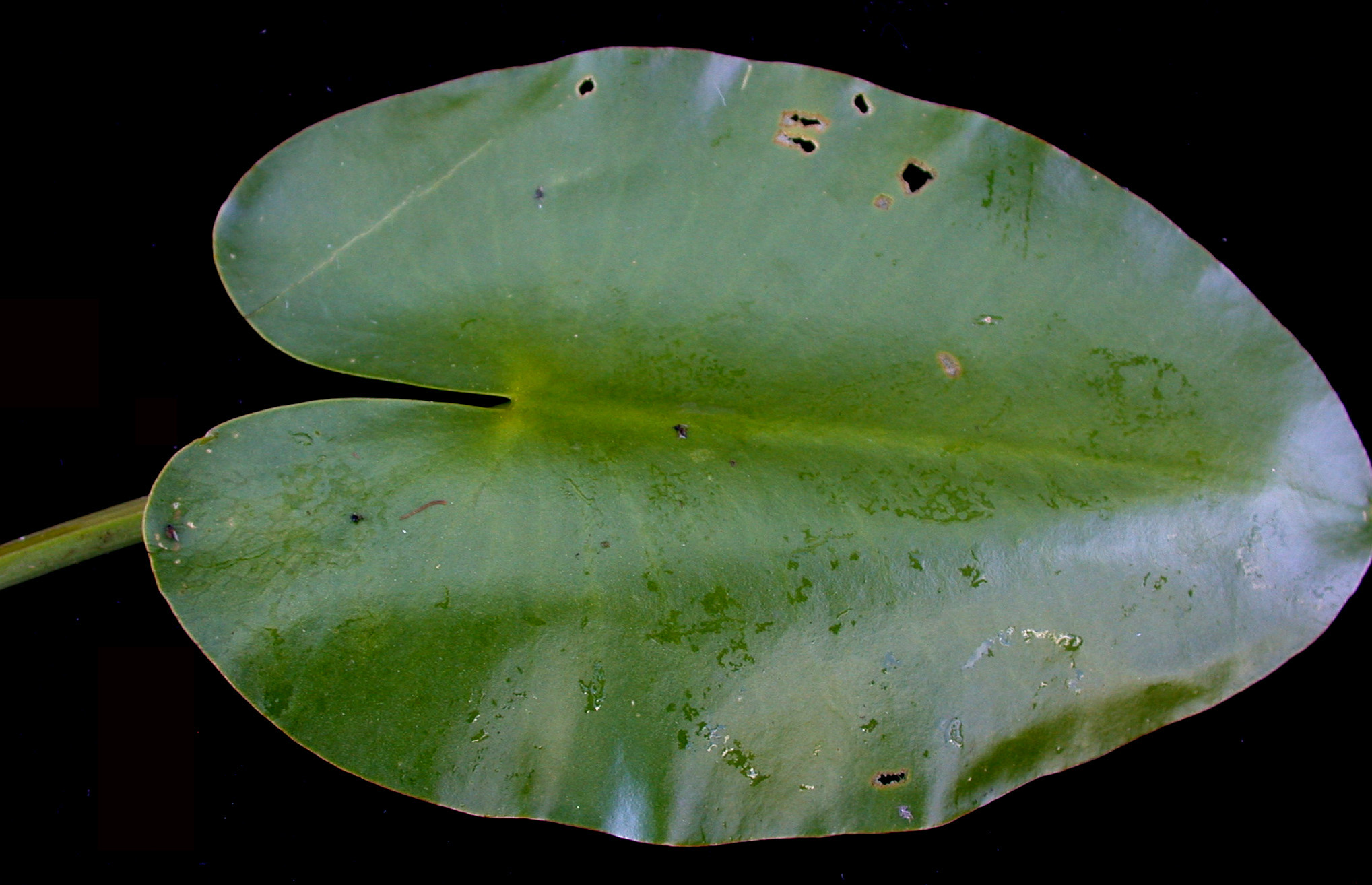

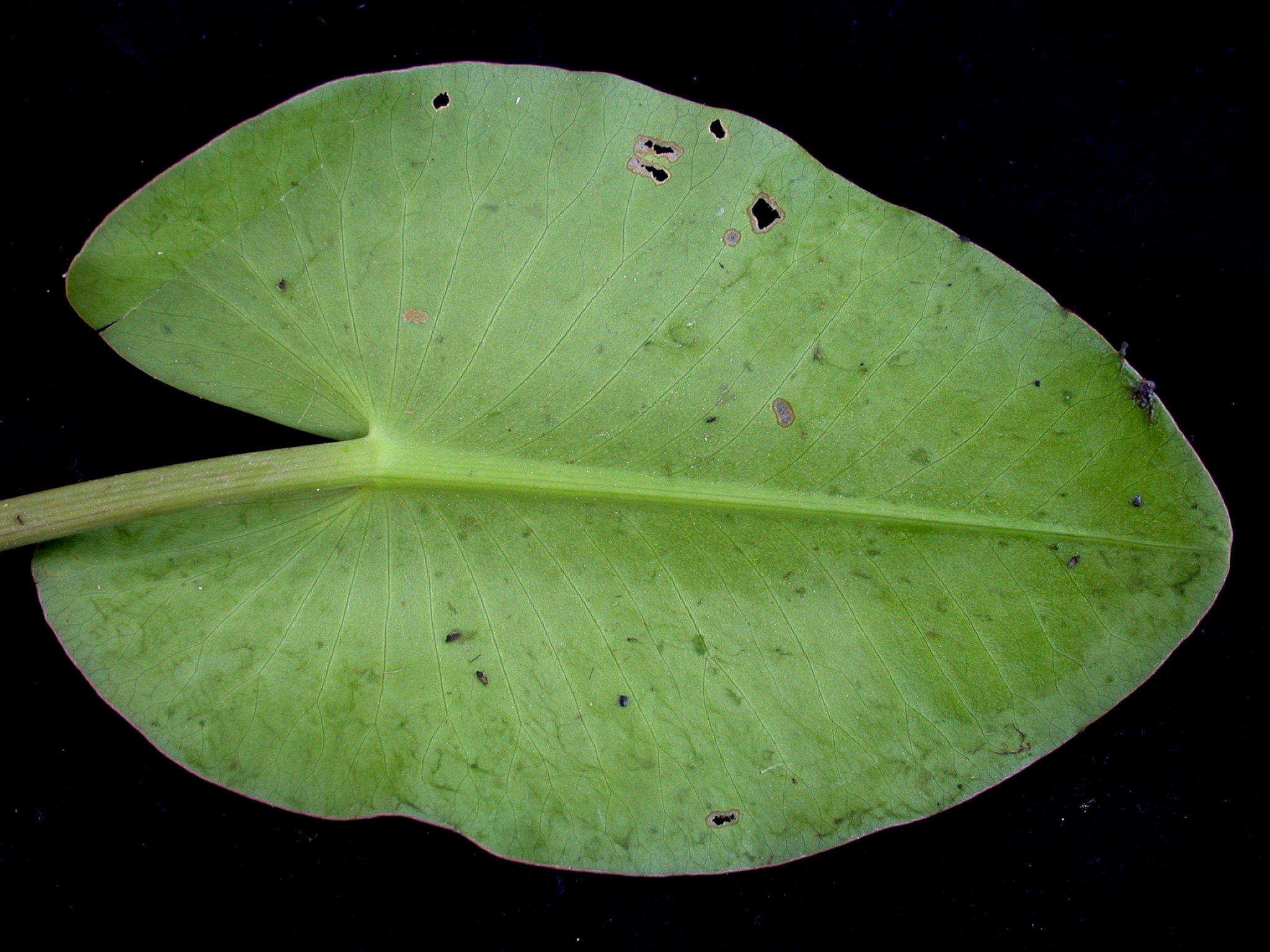
Upper and lower surface of Nuphar variegata leaf

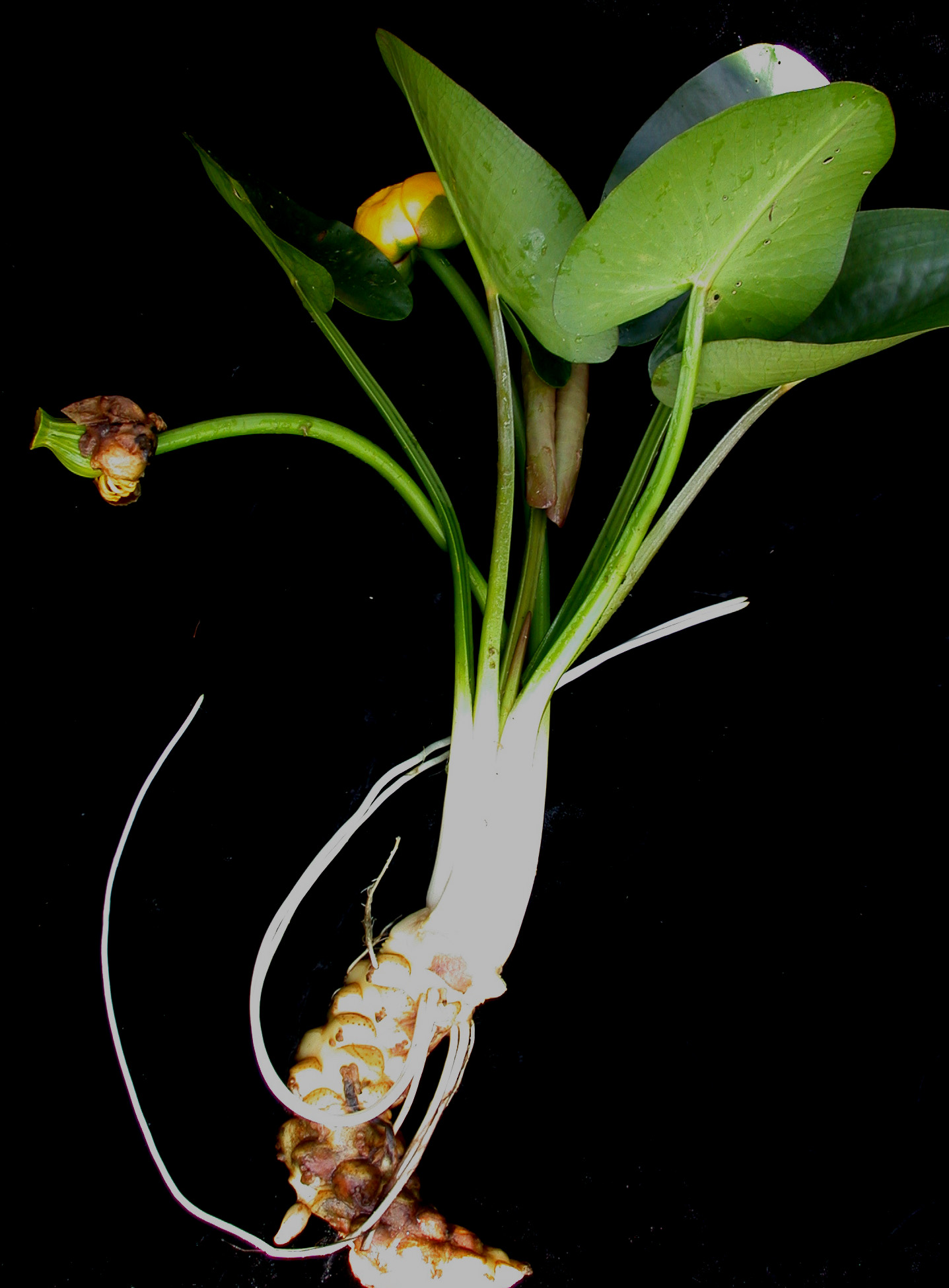
Nuphar variegata flowering and fruiting

=== Vegetative characteristics ===
Nuphar variegata is a rhizomatous, perennial, aquatic herb with 2.5–7 cm wide rhizomes. The leaves are submerged or floating, but most are floating leaves. The submerged leaves are 7–35 cm long, and 5–25 cm wide. The petiole is flattened.

=== Generative characteristics ===
The 2.5–5 cm wide, yellow flowers float on the water surface or extend beyond it. The flowers have 6 yellow sepals which enclose the small petals. The gynoecium consists of 7–28 carpels. The green to yellow, or rarely red stigmatic disk with 7–28 stigmatic rays is 8–20 mm wide. The fleshy, strongly ribbed, ovoid, 2–4.3 cm long, and 2–3.5 cm wide fruit bears 2.5-5 mm long seeds.

== Cytology ==
The chromosome count is 2n = 34.

== Taxonomy ==
It was first validly published by Elias Durand in 1866 based on previous work by George Engelmann. It is placed in the section Nuphar sect. Astylus.

=== Natural hybridisation ===
Together with Nuphar microphylla, it forms the natural hybrid Nuphar × rubrodisca.

=== Etymology ===
The specific epithet variegata, from the Latin variegatus, means variously coloured.

== Conservation ==
The NatureServe conservation status is T5 Secure.

== Ecology ==
=== Habitat ===
It occurs in ponds, lakes, streams, and rivers in up to 2 m deep water.
