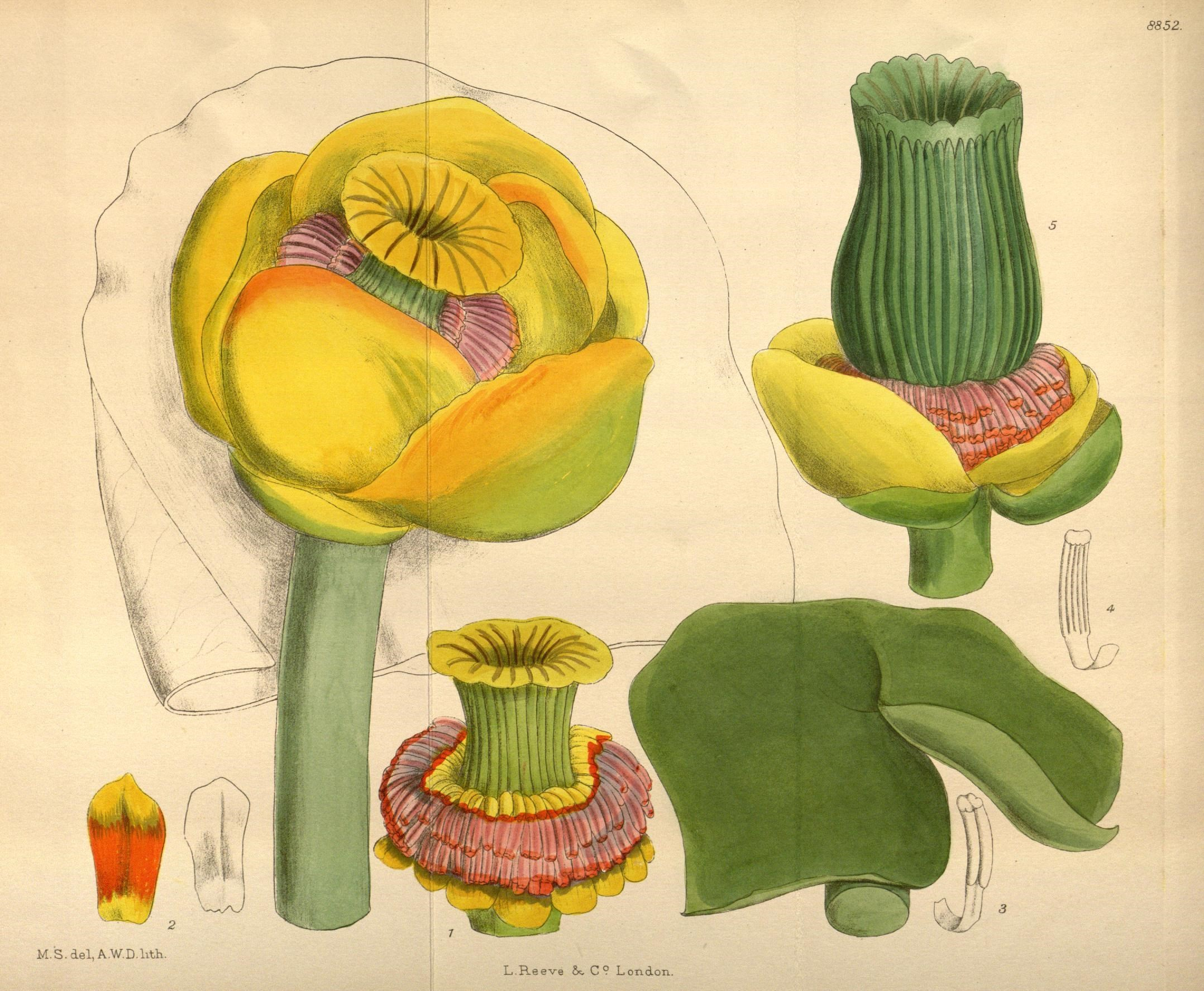
- Nuphar polysepala

Scientific classification
- Kingdom: Plantae
- Clade: Tracheophytes
- Clade: Angiosperms
- Order: Nymphaeales
- Family: Nymphaeaceae
- Genus: Nuphar
- Section: Nuphar sect. Astylus; Padgett

Type species
- Nuphar advena (Aiton) W.T.Aiton

Species
- See here.

= Nuphar sect. Astylus =

Section of the genus Nuphar in the family Nymphaeaceae

Nuphar sect. Astylus is a section within the genus Nuphar native to North America.

== Description ==
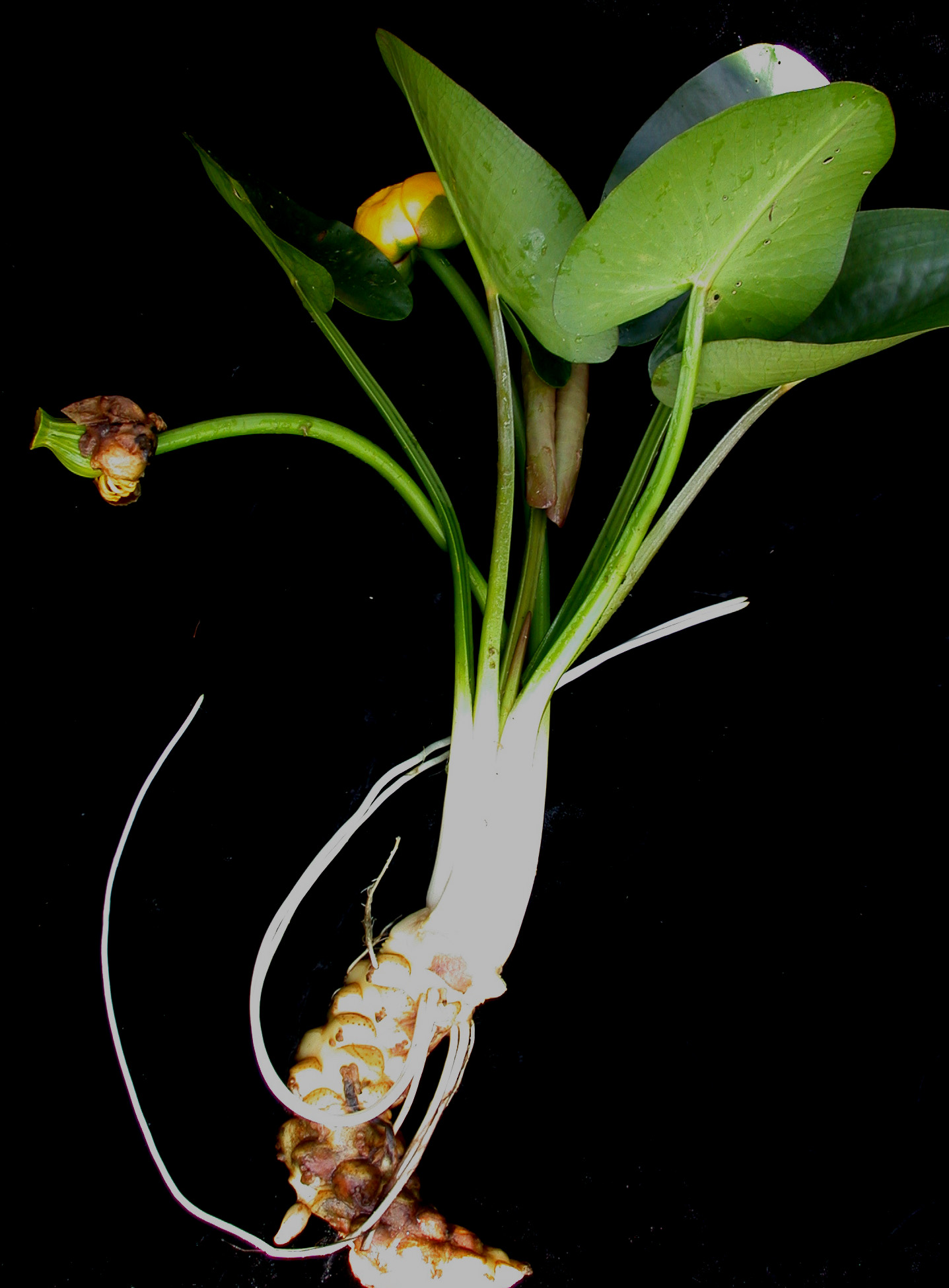
Nuphar variegata

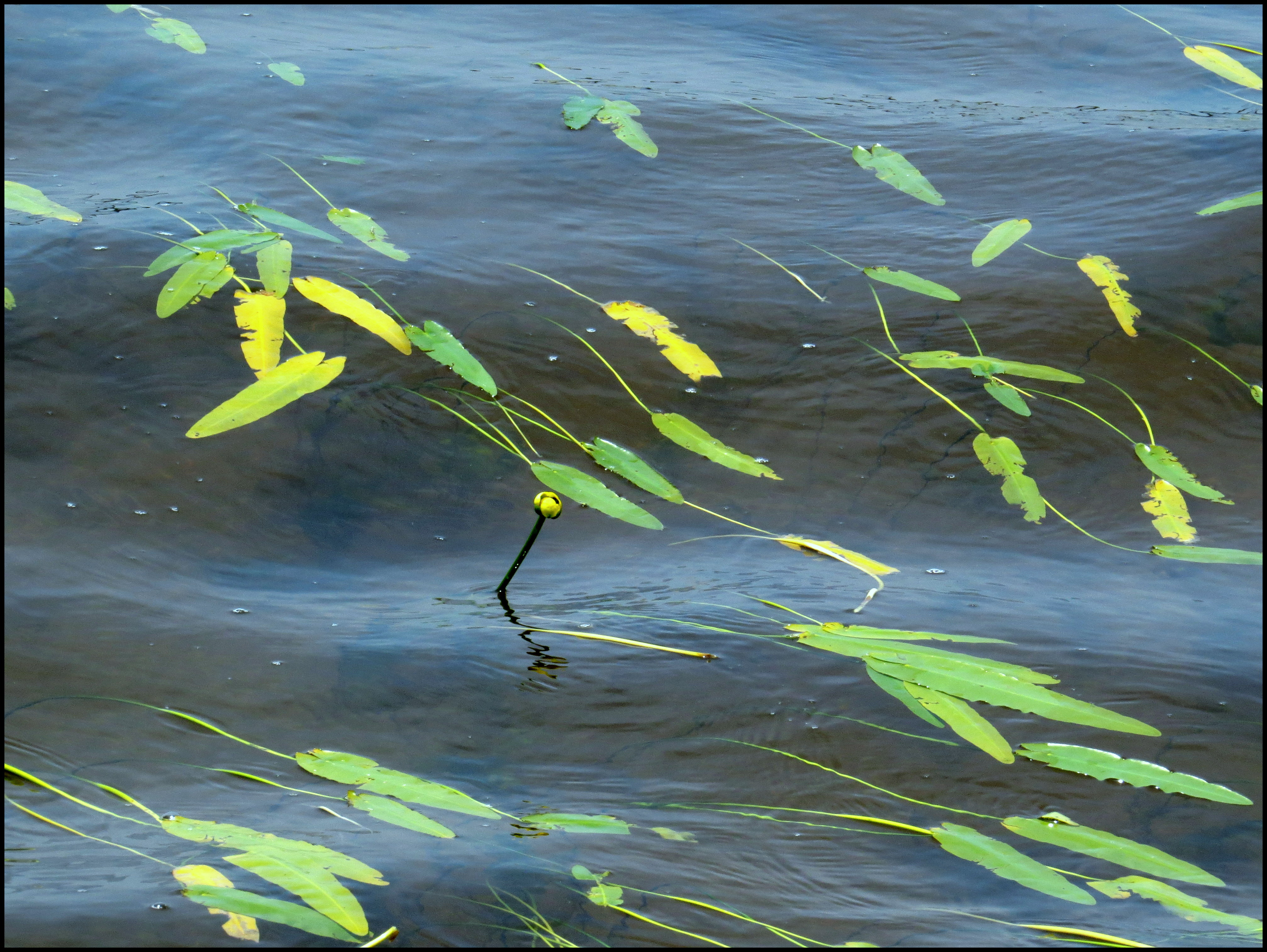
Nuphar sagittifolia

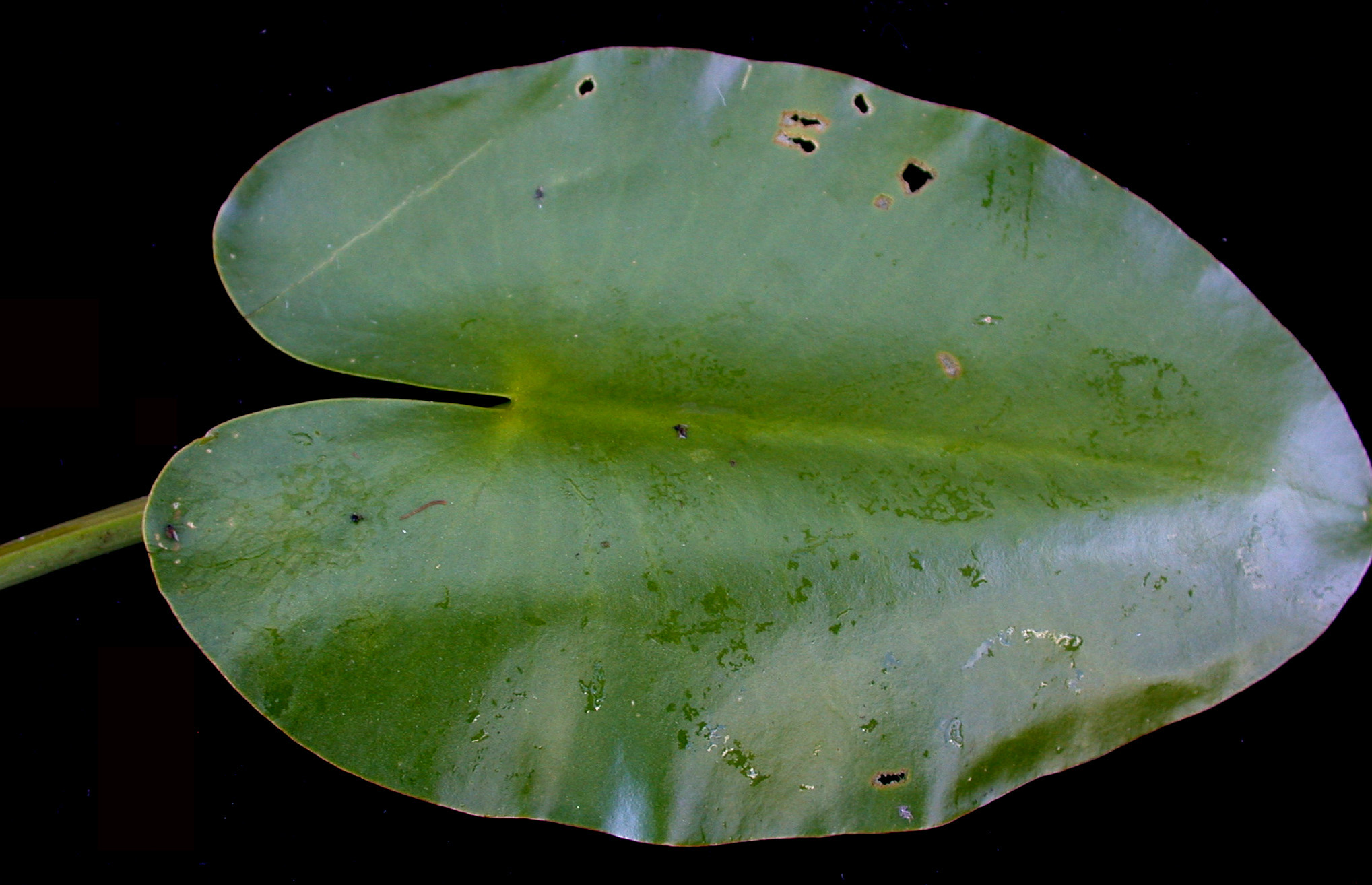

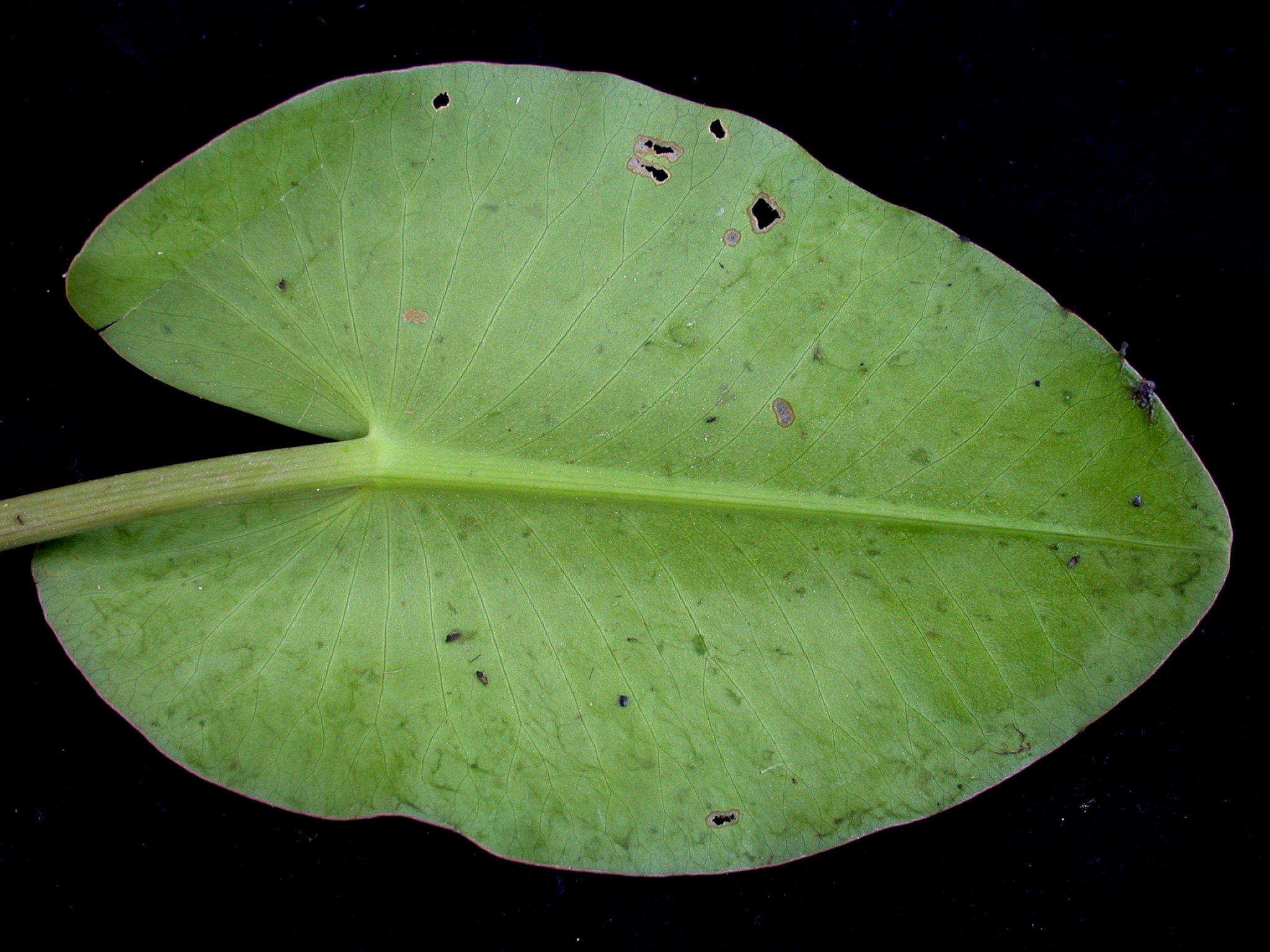
Upper and lower surface of Nuphar variegata leaf

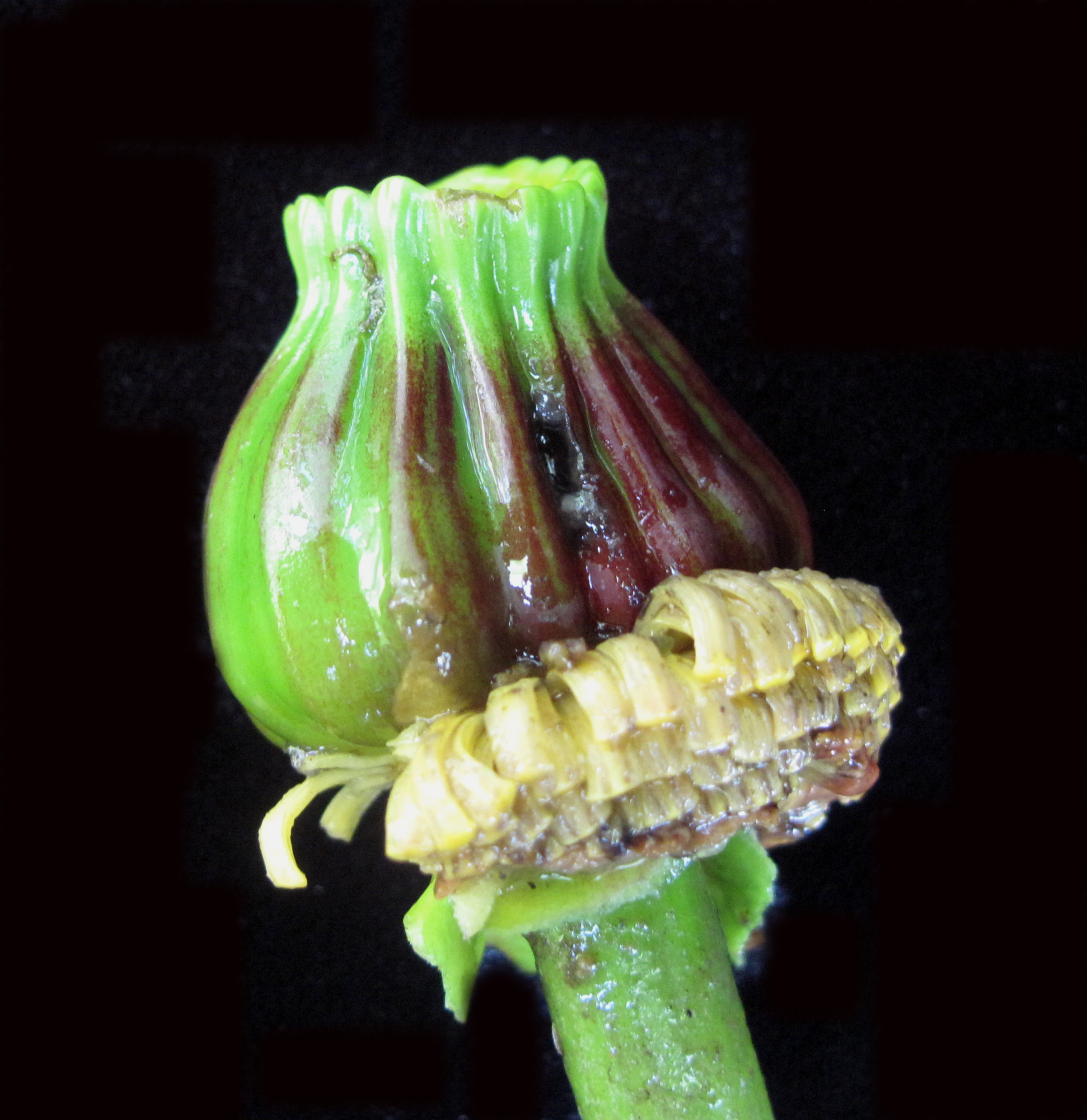
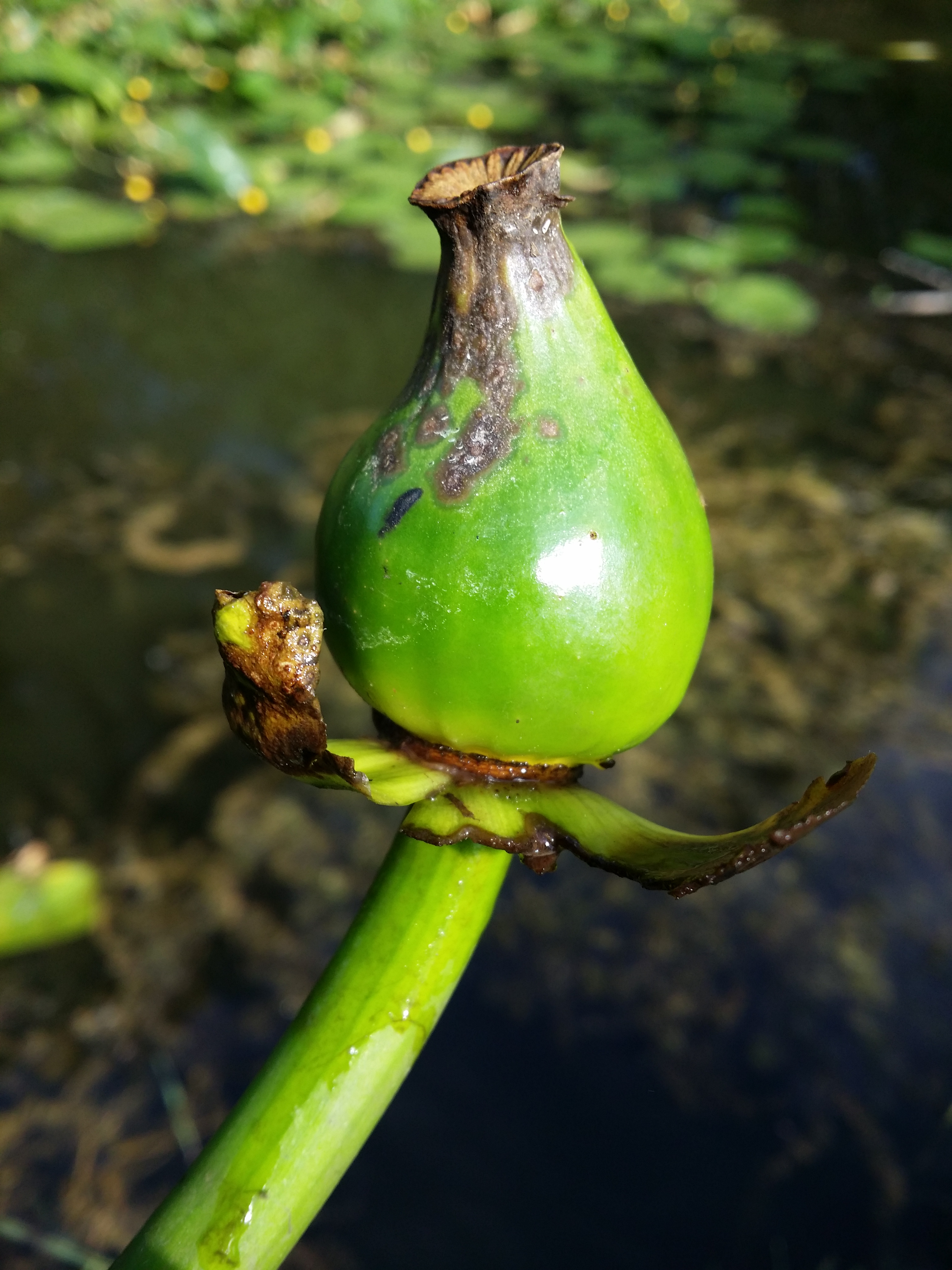
Broad-necked, deeply furrowed fruit of Nuphar sect. Astylus (left) and smooth, urceolate fruit with a slim, elongate neck of Nuphar sect. Nuphar (right)

=== Vegetative characteristics ===
Its species are herbaceous plants.

=== Generative characteristics ===
The flowers have 6–9 sepals. The androecium consists of laminar stamens with long anthers and short filaments. The furrowed, barrel-shaped, ovoid fruit does not have a prominent neck.

== Taxonomy ==
It was described by Donald Jay Padgett in 1999 with Nuphar advena (Aiton) W.T.Aiton as the type species.

=== Species ===
- Nuphar advena (Aiton) W.T.Aiton
- Nuphar polysepala Engelm.
- Nuphar variegata Engelm. ex Durand
- Nuphar sagittifolia (Walter) Pursh
- Nuphar carlquistii DeVore, Taylor & Pigg
- Nuphar ulvacea (G.S.Mill. & Standl.) Standl.
- Nuphar orbiculata (Small) Standl.
- Nuphar ozarkana (G.S.Mill. & Standl.) Standl.

== Etymology ==
The section name Astylus means without a style. The fruits of Nuphar sect. Astylus have broad necks, whereas fruits of Nuphar sect. Nuphar have narrow necks or "styles".

== Distribution ==
It is native to North America.

== Fossil record ==
The fossil species †Nuphar carlquistii from the early eocene of north-central Washington, USA has been identified as member of Nuphar sect. Astylus.

== Ecology ==
=== Pollination ===
The flowers are pollinated by flies, bees, and beetles.
