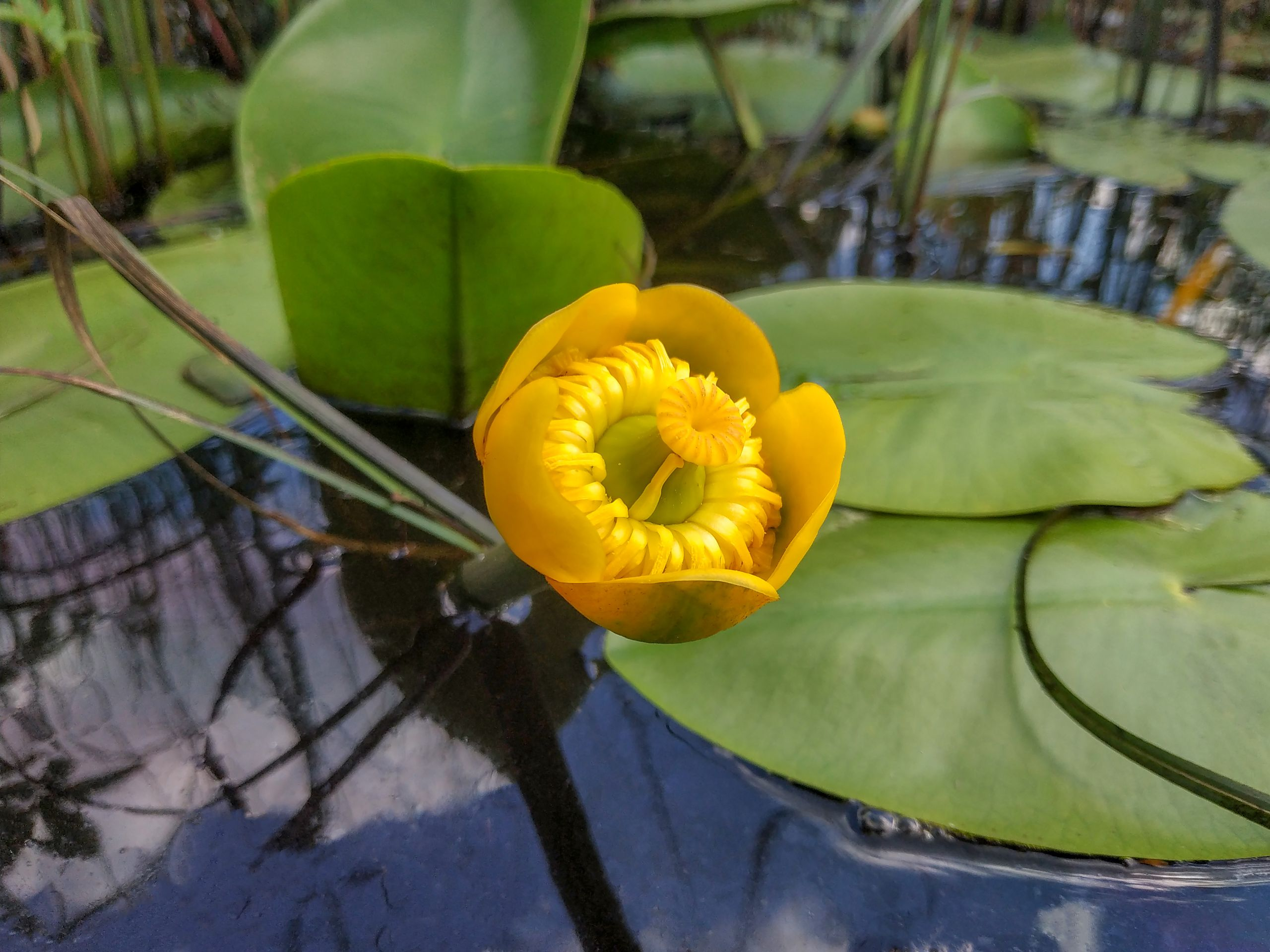
- Flowering Nuphar lutea

Scientific classification
- Kingdom: Plantae
- Clade: Tracheophytes
- Clade: Angiosperms
- Order: Nymphaeales
- Family: Nymphaeaceae
- Genus: Nuphar; Sibth. & Sm.

Type species
- Nuphar lutea (L.) Sm.

Synonyms
- Nymphona Bubani; Nenuphar Link; Nymphozanthus Rich.; Ropalon Raf.

= Nuphar =

Genus of aquatic plants

Nuphar is a genus of aquatic plants in the family Nymphaeaceae, with a temperate to subarctic Northern Hemisphere distribution. Common names include water-lily (Eurasian species; shared with many other genera in the same family), pond-lily, alligator-bonnet or bonnet lily, and spatterdock (North American species).

== Description ==
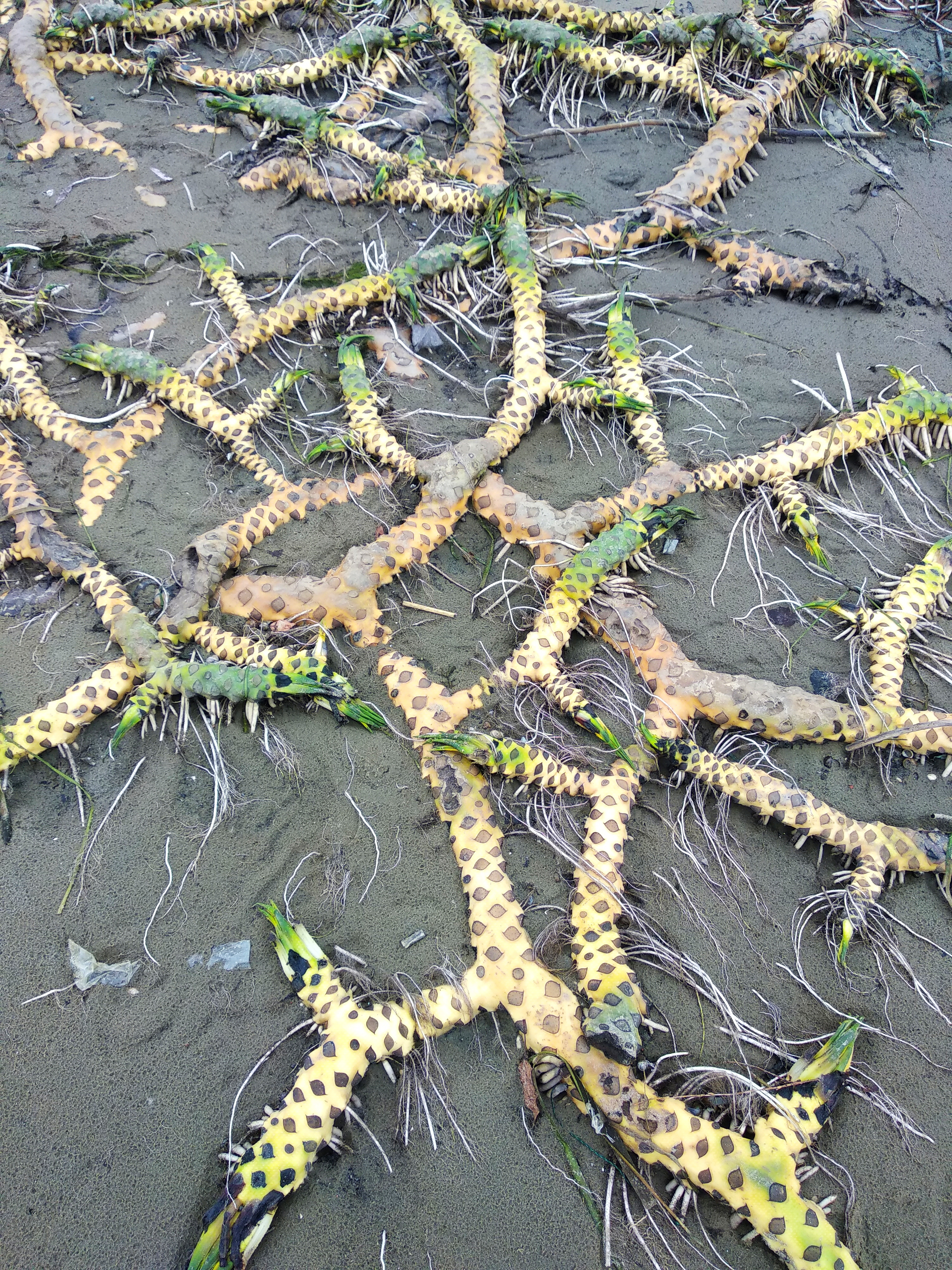
Branching rhizomes of Nuphar lutea
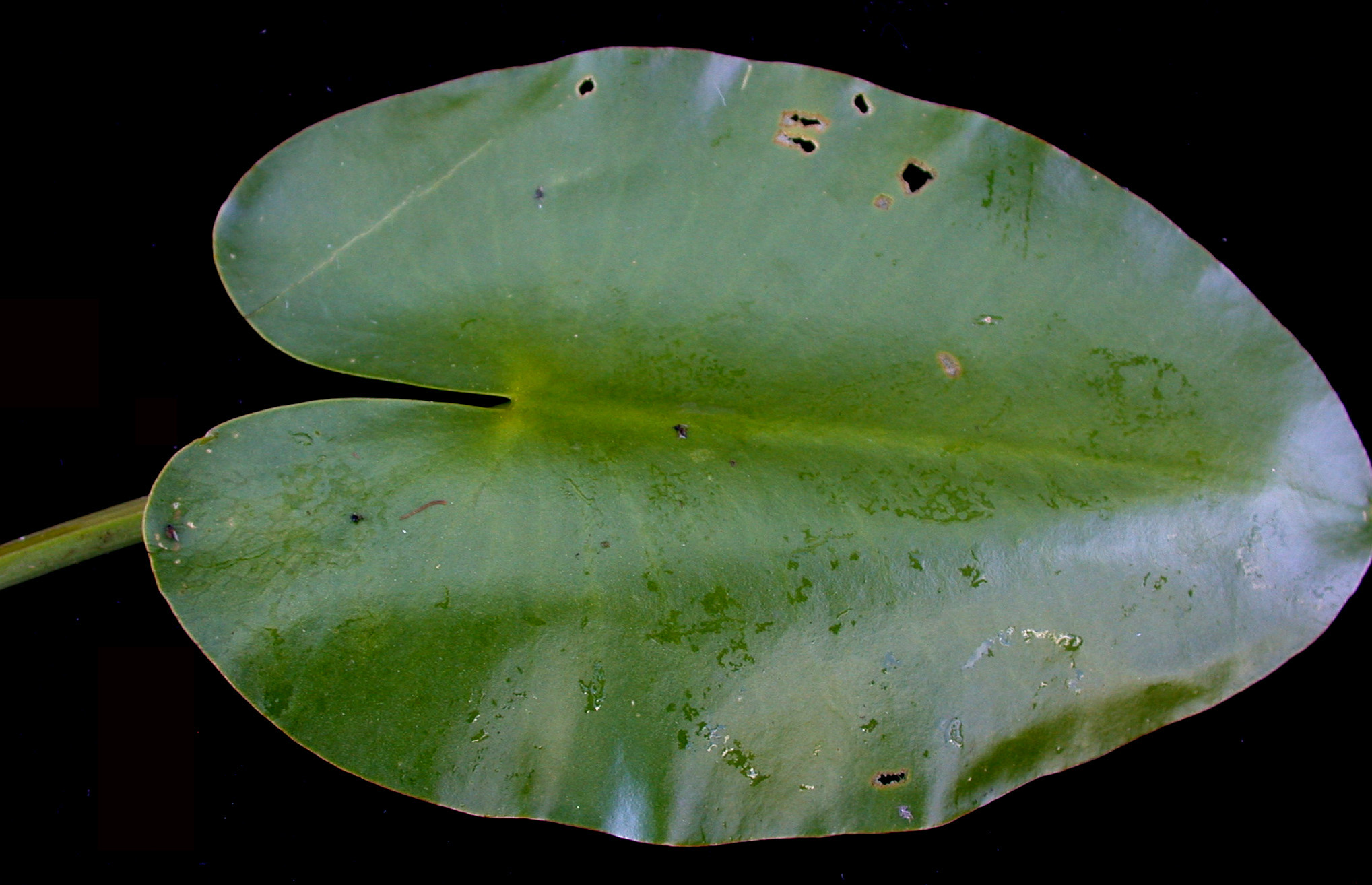

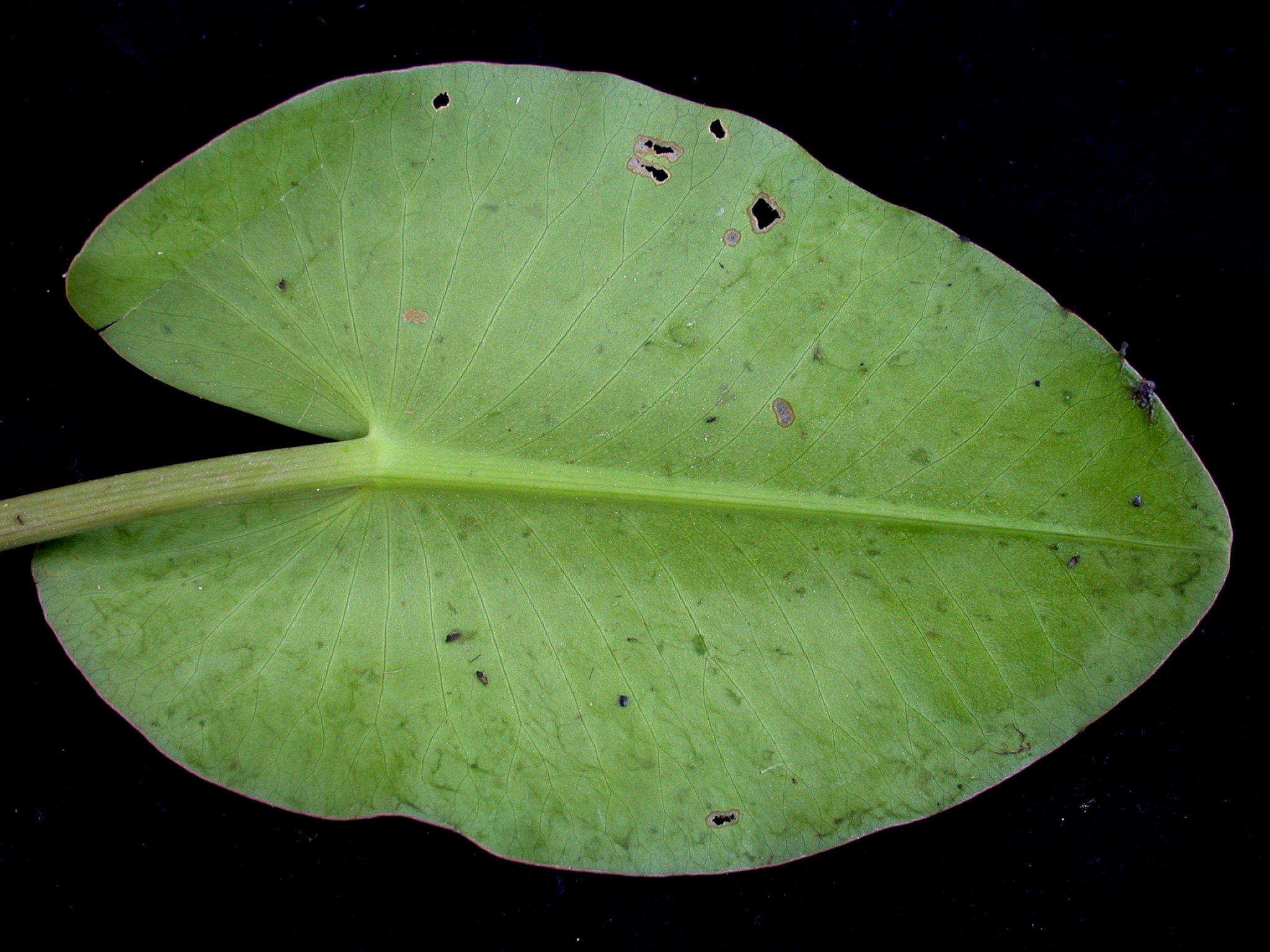
Upper and lower surface of Nuphar variegata leaf

Nuphar species are aquatic, perennial, heterophyllous herbs growing from branching rhizomes, which are not stoloniferous. The rhizomes bear conspicuous leaf scars. The adventitious roots grow underneath and at the side of the rhizome. The leaves can be submerged, floating, or emergent. Their lamina can be ovate, elliptic, orbicular, linear, obovate, or lanceolate. The lamina has an entire margin, but it can be crisped in submerged leaves. The long, flattened, winged, or cylindrical petioles can be pubescent or glabrous.

The flowers are solitary, subglobose, diurnal, pedunculate, floating or emergent, with glabrous to pubescent peduncles. The flowers usually have 5–9 (but up to 12) persistent sepals, which are yellow, green or red and oblong, obovate or orbiculate. The numerous, oblong to spathulate petals are inconspicuous and hidden by the sepals. The yellow or red stamens with strap-like filaments are recurved at dehiscence. The monocolpate pollen grains are 40–71 μm long and 30.4–60 μm wide. The gynoecium consists of 4–36 fused carpels. The fruit is 0.5–5 centimetres (1/4–2 in) wide, ovoid to urceolate, borne on straight peduncles, and bears smooth, exarillate seeds up to 6 millimetres (1/4 in) long.

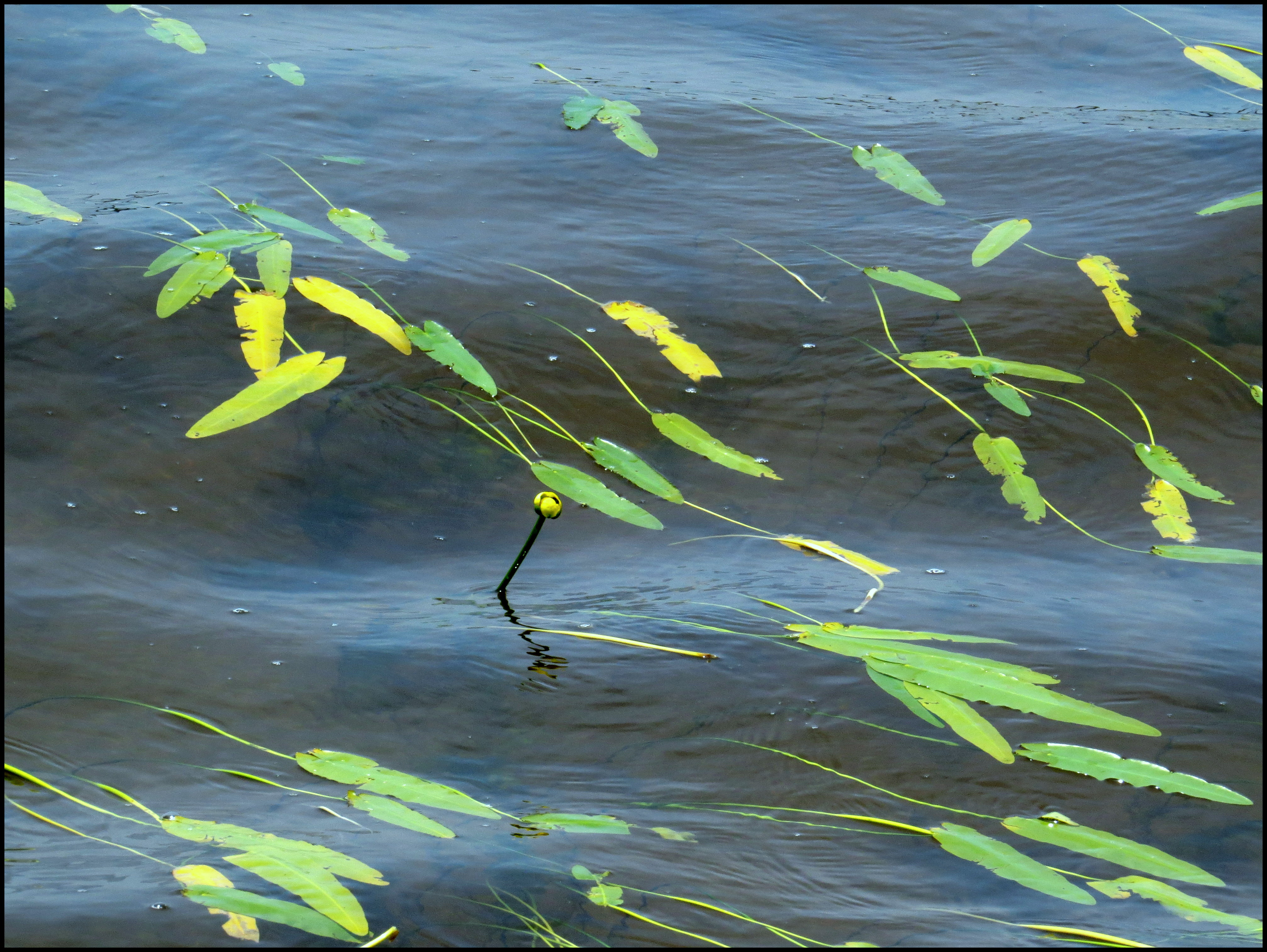
Nuphar sagittifolia with sagittate leaves

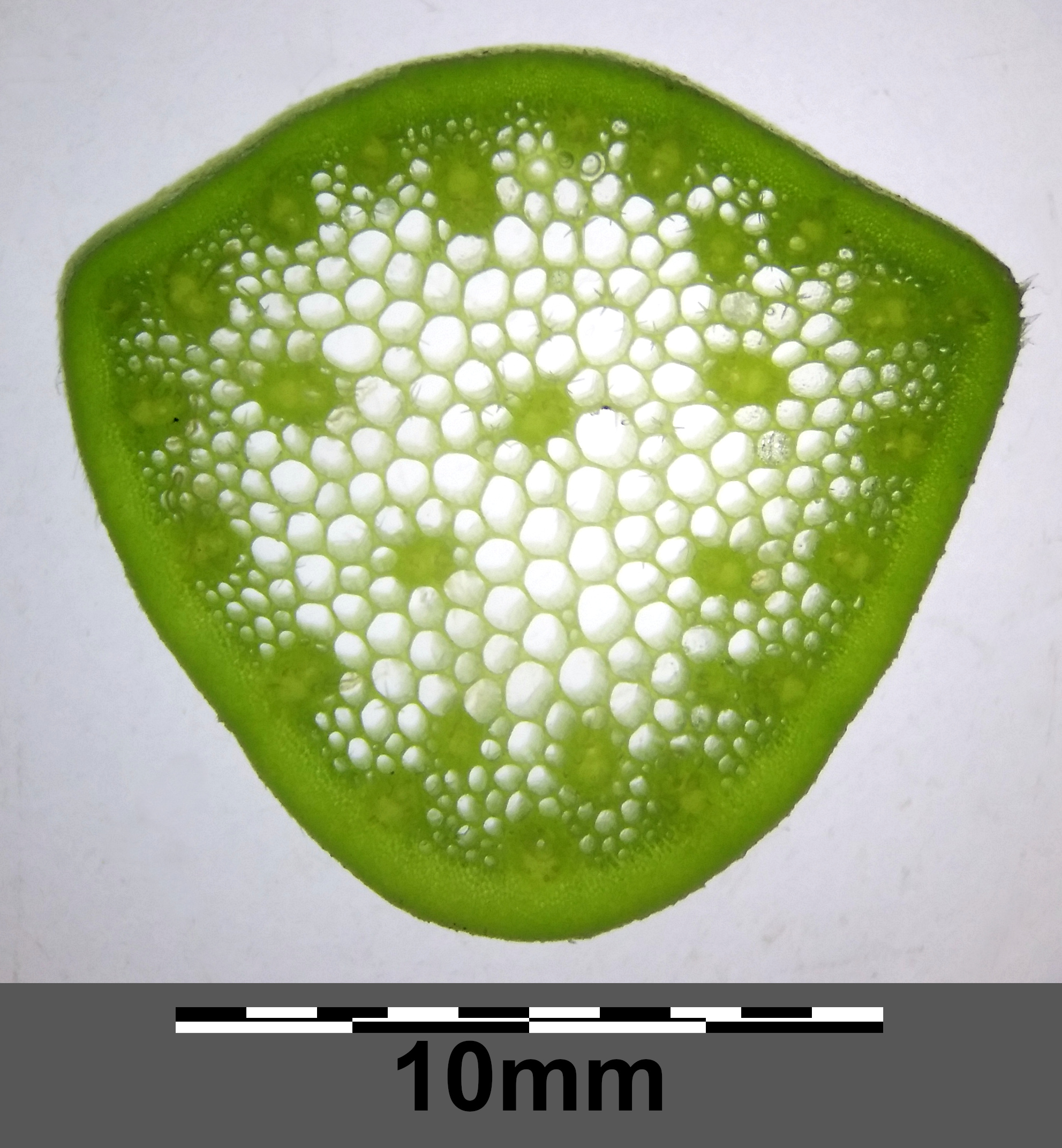
Cross section of N. lutea petioles

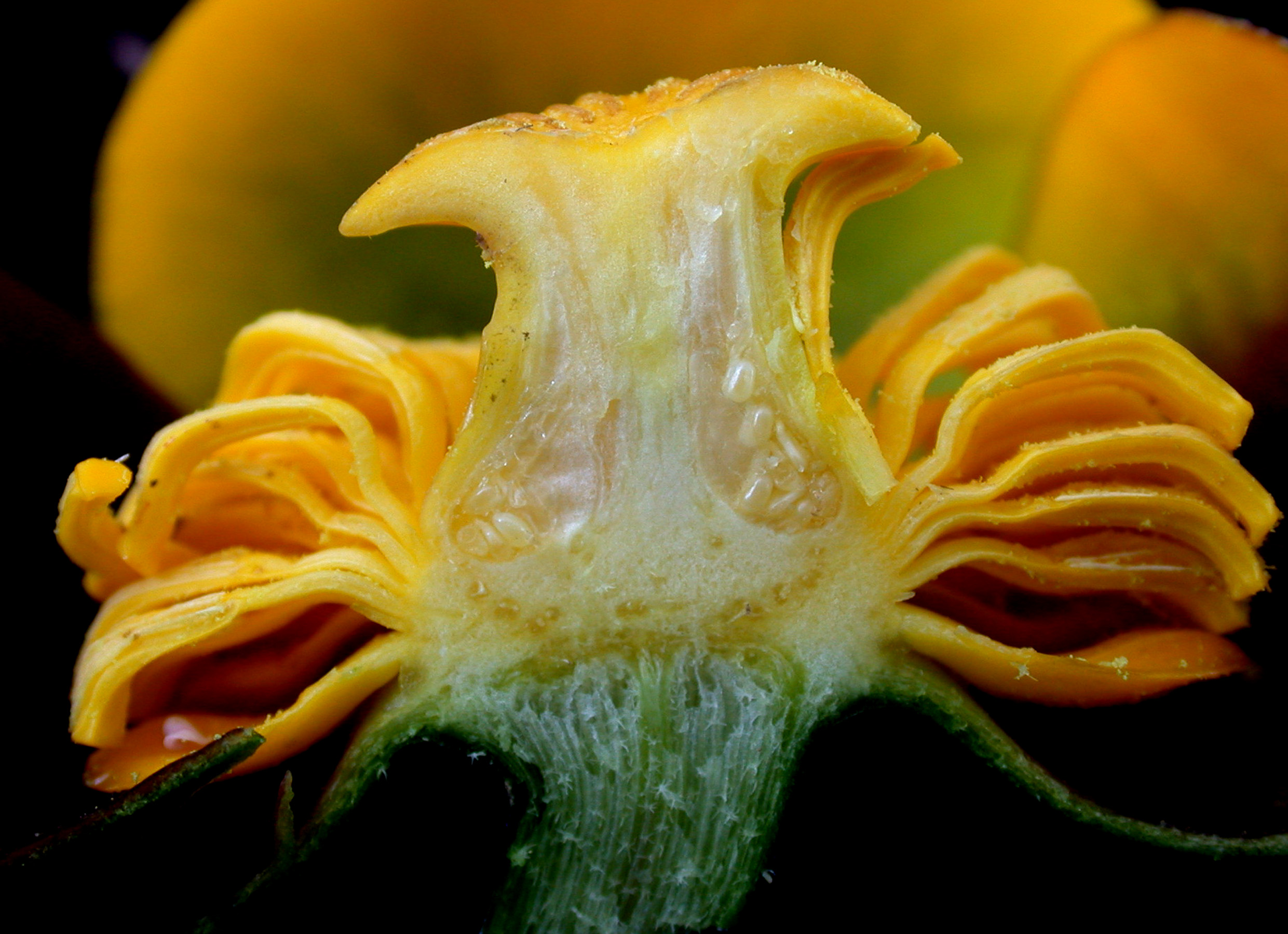
Longitudinally cut flower of N. variegata

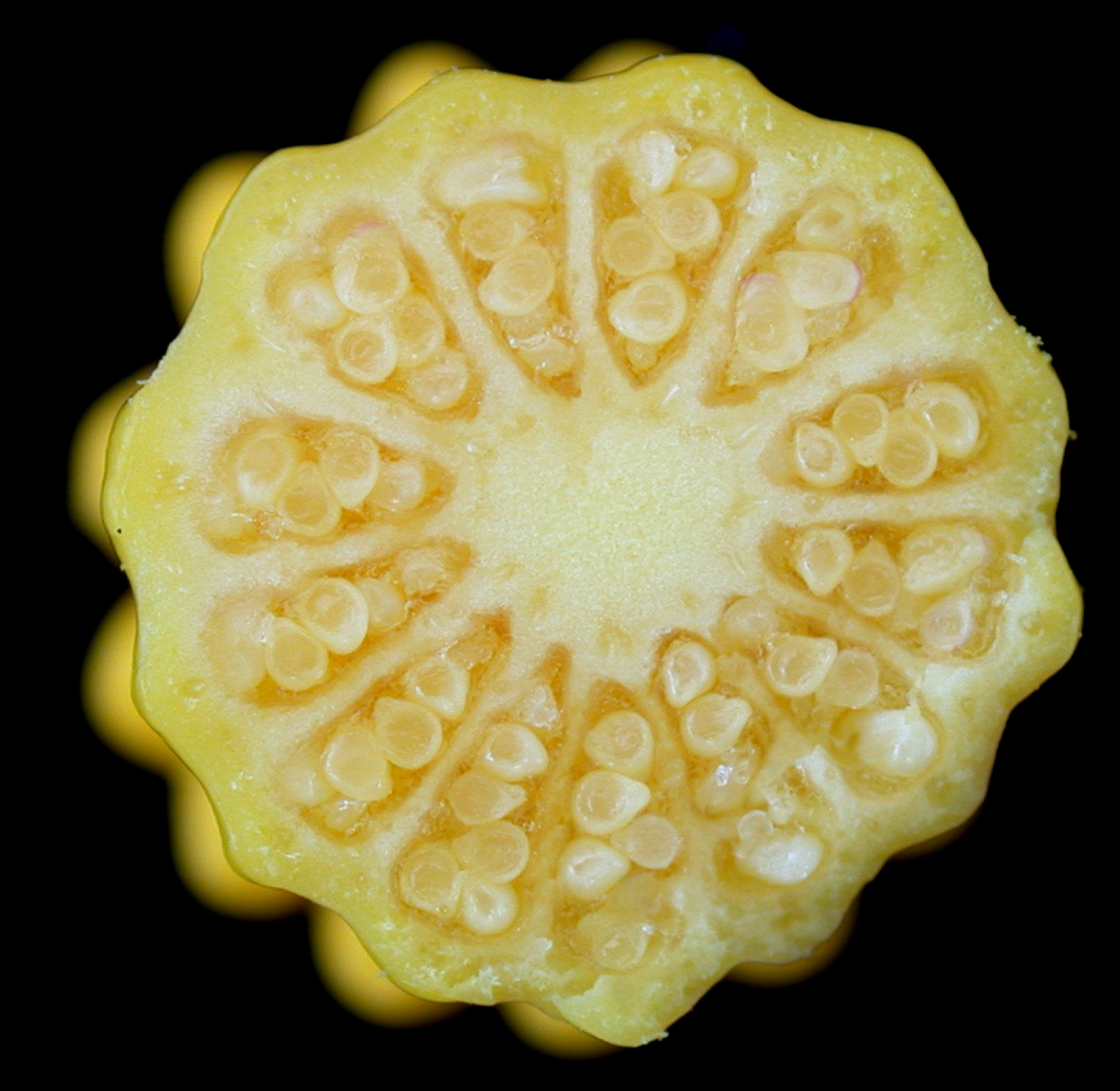
Cross section of N. variegata carpels

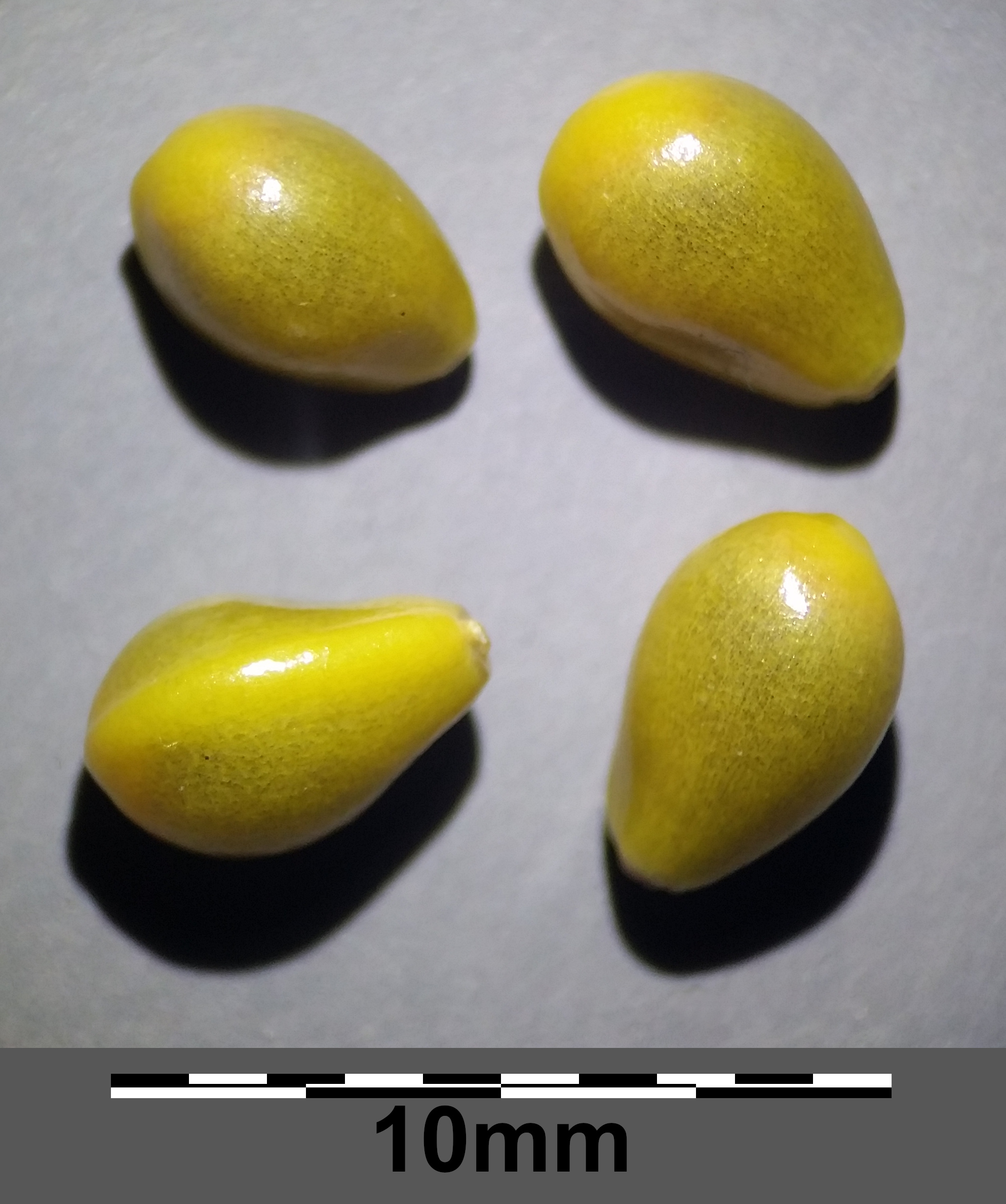
Seeds of N. lutea

== Taxonomy ==
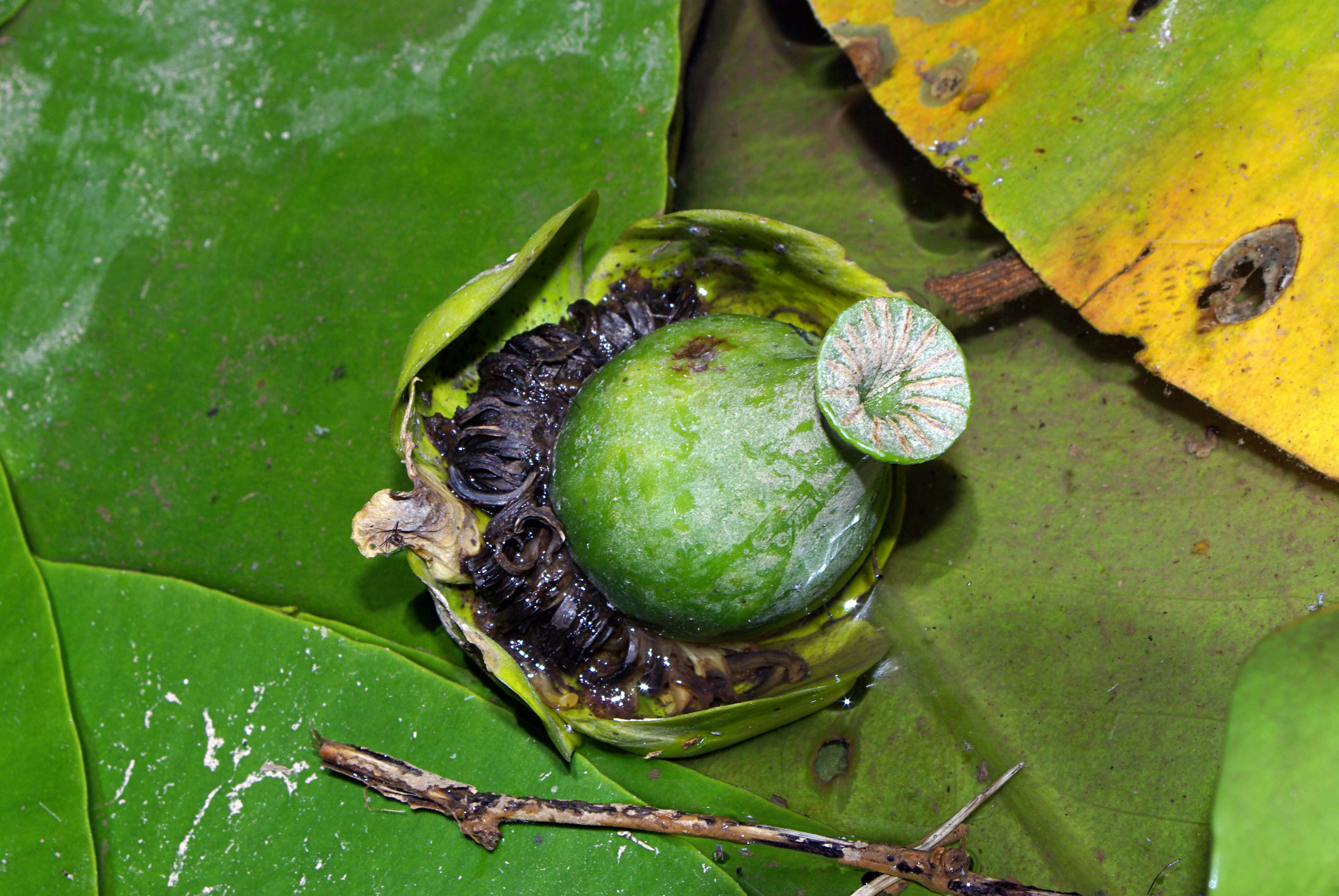
Unripe fruit of Nuphar lutea

The genus Nuphar Sm. was published by James Edward Smith in 1809. The type species is Nuphar lutea (L.) Sm. The genus Nuphar Sm. has several synonyms: Nymphona Bubani published by Pietro Bubani in 1901, Nenuphar Link published by Johann Heinrich Friedrich Link in 1822, Nymphozanthus Rich. published by Louis Claude Marie Richard in 1808, and Ropalon Raf. published by Constantine Samuel Rafinesque in 1837. The genus has been divided into two sections: the autonymous section Nuphar sect. Nuphar with Nuphar lutea (L.) Sm. as the type species, as well as the section Nuphar sect. Astylus Padgett published by Donald Jay Padgett in 1999 with Nuphar advena (Aiton) W.T.Aiton as the type species.

The number of species in the genus is still under review. Until the mid-20th century, some botanists treated the genus as just a single variable species (for which the European N. lutea has priority), while some other authorities accepted about a dozen more species on the basis of traditional taxonomic standards. Recent molecular work has shown that there are substantial differences between the Eurasian species (sect. Nuphar) and American species (sect. Astylus), except for North American N. microphylla which clusters with the Eurasian species. Molecular taxonomy has shown conclusively that recognition of so few species is out of the question, and forced an increased number of recognised species; some sources list about seventy. The Kew Gardens plant list includes over twenty accepted species, subspecies and varieties; it also has a similar number as yet unresolved, together with over twenty synonyms.

=== Species ===
Nuphar sect. Astylus Padgett

- Nuphar advena (Aiton) W.T.Aiton – Spatterdock
- †Nuphar carlquistii DeVore, Taylor, & Pigg
- Nuphar polysepala Engelm. – Wocus
- Nuphar sagittifolia (Walter) Pursh
- Nuphar variegata Engelm. ex Durand – Variegated pond-lily

Nuphar sect. Nuphar (autonym)

- Nuphar japonica DC.
- Nuphar lutea (L.) Sm. – Yellow water-lily (type species)
- Nuphar microphylla (Pers.) Fern
- Nuphar pumila (Timm) DC. – Least water-lily

There also are several interspecific hybrids:

- Nuphar × fluminalis Shiga & Kadono is a natural hybrid of Nuphar japonica and Nuphar submersa
- Nuphar × porphyranthera Lansdown & Ruhsam is a hybrid of Nuphar advena and Nuphar lutea
- Nuphar × rubrodisca Morong is a natural hybrid of Nuphar microphylla and Nuphar variegata
- Nuphar × saijoensis (Shimoda) Padgett & Shimoda is a natural hybrid of Nuphar japonica and Nuphar pumila
- Nuphar × spenneriana Gaudin is a natural hybrid of Nuphar lutea and Nuphar pumila

Additional species include:

- Nuphar oguraensis Miki
- Nuphar orbiculata (Small) Standl.
- Nuphar ozarkana (G.S.Mill. & Standl.) Standl.
- Nuphar saikokuensis Shiga & Kadono
- Nuphar subintegerrima (Casp.) Makino
- Nuphar submersa Shiga & Kadono
- Nuphar ulvacea (G.S.Mill. & Standl.) Standl.

=== Fossil taxa ===
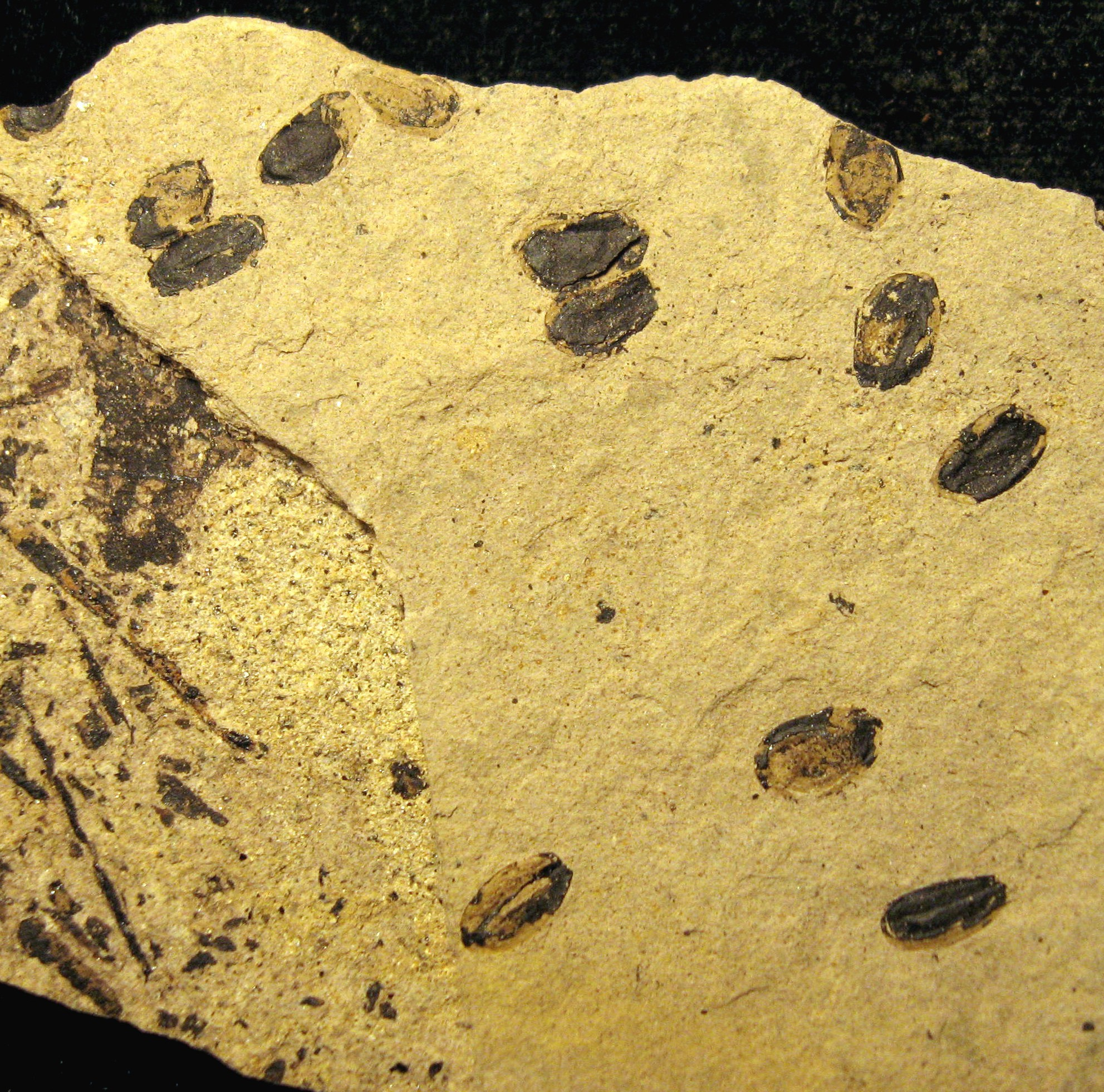
Fossilised seeds of †Nuphar carlquistii

Numerous fossil species have been described:

- †Nuphar aculeata Kuprian.
- †Nuphar adveniformis P.I. Dorof.
- †Nuphar akashiensis Miki
- †Nuphar bohlinii R.W. Chaney
- †Nuphar burejensis Krassilov
- †Nuphar canaliculata C. Reid, E. Reid
- †Nuphar carlquistii DeVore, Wi. Taylor, Pigg
- †Nuphar diatoma (MacGinitie) Doweld
- †Nuphar dubia (Watelet) Bureau
- †Nuphar ebae Huzioka
- †Nuphar hungarica Andr., E. Novák
- †Nuphar macrosperma P.I. Dorof.
- †Nuphar mozyrensis P.I. Dorof.
- †Nuphar ovata M. Chandler
- †Nuphar palfalvyana Doweld
- †Nuphar parva Lubomirova
- †Nuphar pliocenica P.I. Dorof.
- †Nuphar sibirica P.I. Dorof.
- †Nuphar tanaitica P.I. Dorof.
- †Nuphar tastachensis P.I. Dorof.
- †Nuphar tavdensis P.I. Dorof.
- †Nuphar tomskiana P.I. Dorof.
- †Nuphar tymensis P.I. Dorof.
- †Nuphar wutuensis L. Chen, Manchester, Z.-D. Chen

=== Related taxa ===
In 2017, the abundant fossilized seeds of a water lily, known as Notonuphar, were identified in the Eocene-aged La Meseta Formation of Seymour Island, Antarctica. The seed anatomy of Notonuphar closely resembles that of Nuphar, and for this reason, both are thought to be sister genera. Notonuphar is the first relative of Nuphar known to have inhabited Gondwana, and the wide geographic separation of both genera (Notonuphar inhabited Antarctica, while all extant and extinct Nuphar species are known from the Northern Hemisphere) supports the modern range of Nuphar being a relict distribution.

=== Etymology ===
The etymology of the word is: medieval Latin nuphar, from medieval Latin nenuphar, thence from Arabic nīnūfar, thence from Persian nīlūfar, thence from Sanskrit nīlōtpala = blue lotus flower. For botanical gender, the name is treated as feminine.

== Habitat ==
Nuphar species occur in ponds, lakes, and slow-moving rivers, growing in water up to 5 metres (16 feet) deep; different species are variously adapted either to nutrient-rich waters (e.g. N. lutea) or nutrient-poor waters (e.g. N. pumila).

Wetland soils are hypoxic and this genus is known to be capable of temporary growth even in the absence of oxygen. Also there can be mass flow of oxygen-containing air, entering by means of the young leaves, passing through the rhizome, and exiting through the older leaves. Both of these physiological adaptations to flooding are considered typical of many wetland and aquatic plants.

== Ecology ==
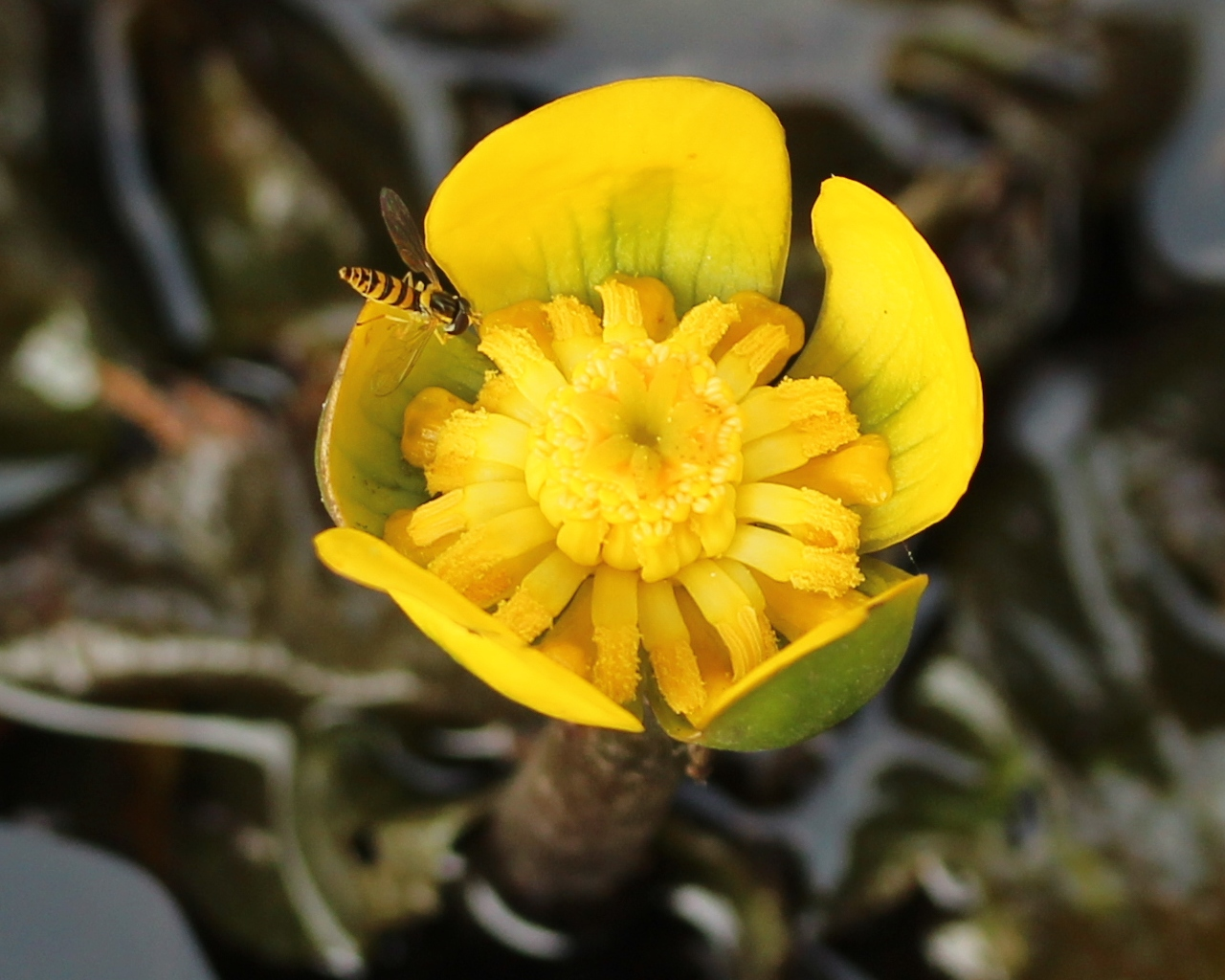
N. subintegerrima flower attended by hoverfly

Like many other vigorously growing members of Nymphaeaceae, some species of Nuphar tend to cover the water surface completely, blocking out the light and thereby killing both submerged plants and less competitive surface-growing aquatics. They also produce alkaloids that have experimentally been shown to be allelopathic, though it is not clear how relevant the compounds may be in the wild.

Birds such as some species of ducks eat Nuphar seeds, and mammals such as beaver and coypu eat the roots of at least some species. Deer eat the flowers and young leaves, and the leaves are grazed by other animals.

Nuphar flowers are pollinated by flies, bees, and beetles.

== Uses ==
Some species have been used by indigenous peoples. Young shoots and leaves sometimes were cooked but might be too bitter to eat. Whether the roots may be eaten, as is widely reported, is open to doubt; some sources claim that they are too bitter, too full of tannin, or simply too poisonous to eat unsoaked, except when treated for so long that they are not viable as a famine food. All sources however, agree that ripe seeds may be popped or variously used in cookery. They then are pleasant and nutritious, but require a lot of work to harvest and strip from the fruit capsule. To some extent this may be circumvented rotting the fruit under water for three weeks or more, after which removing the seeds is easier. The rotting material however, is very unpleasant to deal with. The flower petals are said to be used in making tea, but it is not clear whether that refers to the petals proper, or to the larger and more conspicuous sepals. The leaves of some species are large enough to be of use in wrapping food, for example in cooking.

Alkaloids in the genus include nupharolutine, nuphamine and nupharidine. The presence of such compounds could explain some of the medicinal uses.

There has been growing interest in Nuphar alkaloids, their biological and pharmacological significance and their synthesis in recent decades. It has been speculated that these and other bioactive compounds might be related to some of the folk-medical applications of the plants.

Apart from pharmaceuticals, Nuphar leaves are reported to contain sufficient concentrations of tannin to have been widely used for tanning and dyeing leather, and also as a styptic for staunching bleeding. The roots of some species also contain sufficient tannin to have been used for tanning.

== See also ==
- List of plants known as lily
