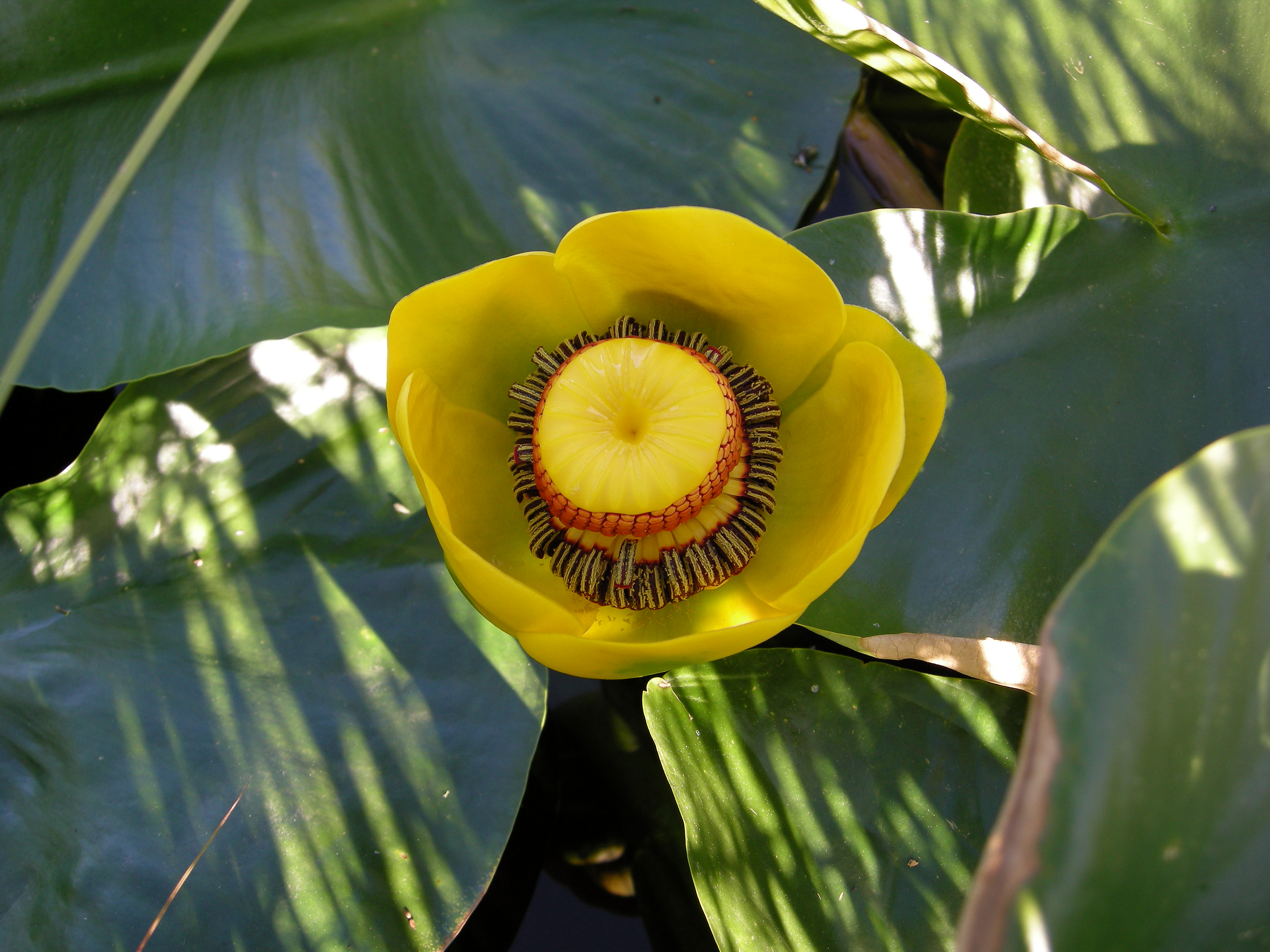

Conservation status
- Secure (NatureServe)

Scientific classification
- Kingdom: Plantae
- Clade: Tracheophytes
- Clade: Angiosperms
- Order: Nymphaeales
- Family: Nymphaeaceae
- Genus: Nuphar
- Section: Nuphar sect. Astylus
- Species: N. polysepala

Binomial name
- Nuphar polysepala Engelm.

Synonyms
- List: Castalia polysepala (Engelm.) Greene; Nuphar lutea subsp. polysepala (Engelm.) Beal; Nymphaea polysepala (Engelm.) Kuntze; Nymphozanthus polysepalus (Engelm.) Fernald; Nuphar polysepala var. picta Engelm.

= Nuphar polysepala =

Species of flowering plant

Nuphar polysepala, also known as the great yellow pond-lily, wokas, or wocus, is a perennial, rhizomatous, aquatic herb in the genus Nuphar. It has floating green leaves and yellow flowers.

The species is native to wetlands of western North America. The seeds are edible and the plant has been used in traditional medicine to treat superficial irritations.

== Description ==
Nuphar polysepala is a perennial, rhizomatous, aquatic herb with an extensive root system. The rhizomes are up to 5 metres (16 ft) long and 3–8 centimetres (1 1/4–3 1/4 in) wide, spongy, creeping, and branching. The leaves are submerged or floating. The ovate to oblong leaf is 10–45 cm (4–17 1/2 in) long and 7–30 cm (3–12 in) wide. The terete petiole is up to 2 m (6 1/2 ft) long.

The flowers are solitary, pedunculate, bisexual, and 5–10 cm wide. They float on the water surface or extend beyond it. They have (6–)9(–12) green to bright yellow sepals, which occasionally have a red base. The 10–20 green to yellow, thick petals are hidden by the stamens. The fruit is ovoid to cylindric, strongly ribbed, 4–6(–9) cm long, and 3.5–6 cm wide. It bears seeds 4 millimetres (1/8 in) in length.

The chromosome count is 2n = 34.

== Taxonomy ==
It was published by George Engelmann in 1866. The lectotype specimen was collected by C. C. Parry in Osborn's Lake, Colorado, in 1864. It is placed in the section Nuphar sect. Astylus.

=== Etymology ===
The specific epithet polysepala means "with many sepals".

== Distribution and habitat ==
It is native to western North America. It is commonly found in shallow muddy ponds from northern Alaska and Yukon southward to central California and northern New Mexico, and can be recognized easily by its large floating leaves and bright yellow blossoms.

It occurs in slowly flowing streams, ponds, and lakes in up to 2,4 m deep water.

== Ecology ==
It is pollinated by flies and beetles and provides shelter for fish.

== Conservation ==
The NatureServe conservation status is T5 Secure.

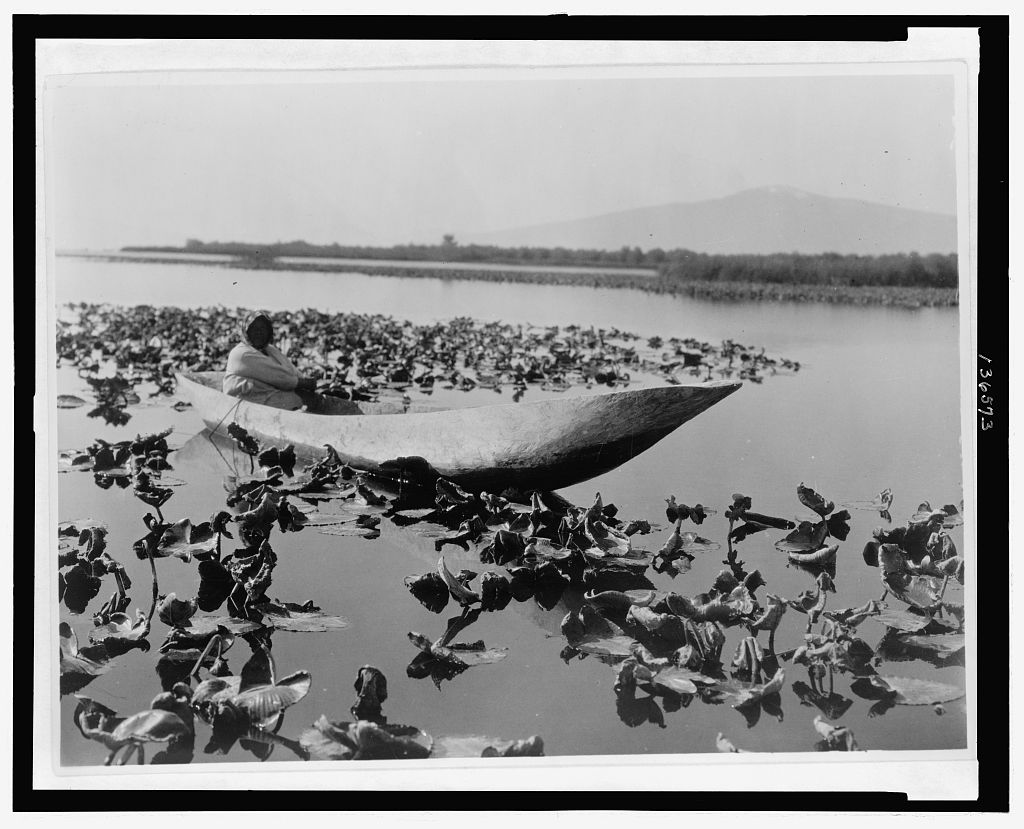
The Wokas season, photograph by Edward S. Curtis

== Uses ==
The seeds are edible; they pop like popcorn, and can be steamed as a vegetable, dried and ground for flour, or can be cooked like oatmeal. Historically they have been a significant source of carbohydrates for the Klamath and Modoc peoples who inhabit the area near Oregon's Upper Klamath Lake.

The leaves and rootstocks have traditionally been used for ulcerous skin conditions and swelling. The rootstock infusion is used as a traditional gargle for mouth, sore throats and douche for vaginal inflammation. One cup of boiling water is used for two tablespoons of chopped rhizome.
