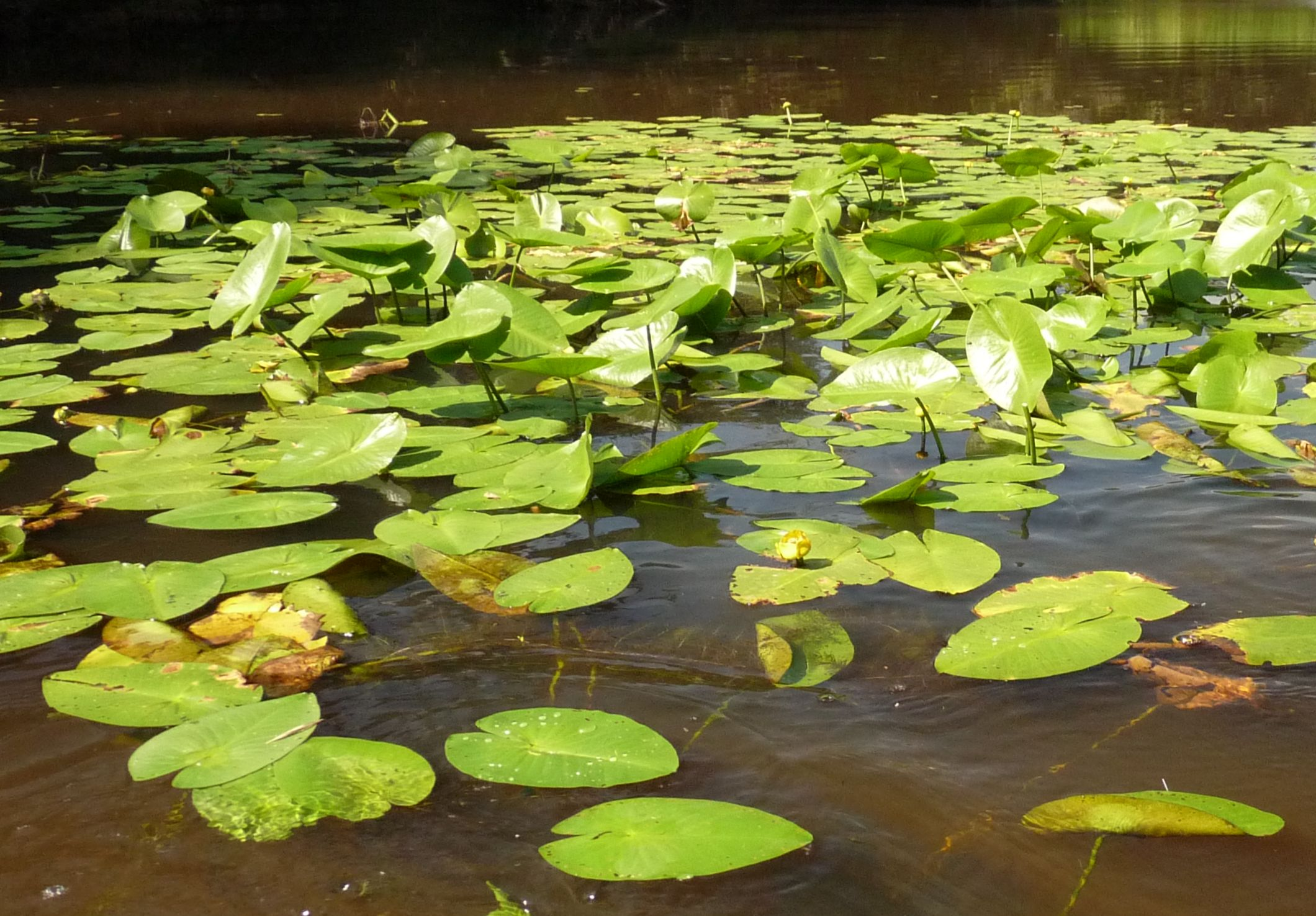

Scientific classification
- Kingdom: Plantae
- Clade: Tracheophytes
- Clade: Angiosperms
- Order: Nymphaeales
- Family: Nymphaeaceae
- Genus: Nuphar
- Section: Nuphar sect. Nuphar
- Species: N. saikokuensis

Binomial name
- Nuphar saikokuensis Shiga & Kadono
- Nuphar saikokuensis is endemic to Japan

= Nuphar saikokuensis =

Species of perennial aquatic plant

Nuphar saikokuensis is a species of rhizomatous aquatic plant endemic to Japan.

== Description ==
=== Vegetative characteristics ===
Nuphar saikokuensis is an aquatic perennial herb with prostrate, branching rhizomes. The leaves are submerged, floating, or emergent. The petiolate, ovate floating or emergent leaves with a cordate base and an obtuse apex are 10–30 cm long, and 7–20 cm wide. The adaxial leaf surface is glabrous, and the abaxial leaf surface is pubescent. The membranous, ovate to round submerged leaves with an undulate margin are 7–30 cm long, and 5–20 cm wide. The petioles are flattened to terete.

=== Generative characteristics ===
The yellow, protogynous, pedunculate, 3–4 cm wide flowers are raised above the water surface. The five subcoriaceous, obovate to orbicular sepals are 1.5–2.5 cm long. The petals are 5–8 mm long. The androecium consists of numerous stamens with 4–6 mm long anthers. The gynoecium consists of numerous fused carpels. The yellow, 4–11 mm wide stigmatic disk has 5–17 stigmatic rays, which are 2.5–4 mm long. The ovoid, green, 2.5–4 cm long, and 1.5–3 cm wide fruit bears many ovoid, 3.5–5 mm long, and 3–4.5 mm wide seeds.

== Reproduction ==
=== Generative reproduction ===
Flowering occurs from June to October. Despite likely being of hybrid origin, it is fertile.

== Taxonomy ==
=== Publication ===
It was first described by Takashi Shiga and Yasuro Kadono in 2015.

=== Type specimen ===
The type specimen was collected by T. Shiga in Oda-cho, Ono-shi, Hyogo prefecture, Japan on the 30th of May 2001.

=== Natural hybridisation ===
It is likely a natural hybrid of Nuphar japonica with Nuphar subintegerrima, or Nuphar oguraensis. It is possible, that all three species are involved.

== Etymology ==
The specific epithet saikokuensis is derived from the Japanese regional name "Saikoku", meaning Western Japan, to which this species is native to.

== Conservation ==
It is threatened by extinction, and several populations have already gone extinct.

== Ecology ==
=== Habitat ===
It occurs in ponds, rivers, lakes, and streams.
