= Loch an Tuirc =

Loch in Scotland

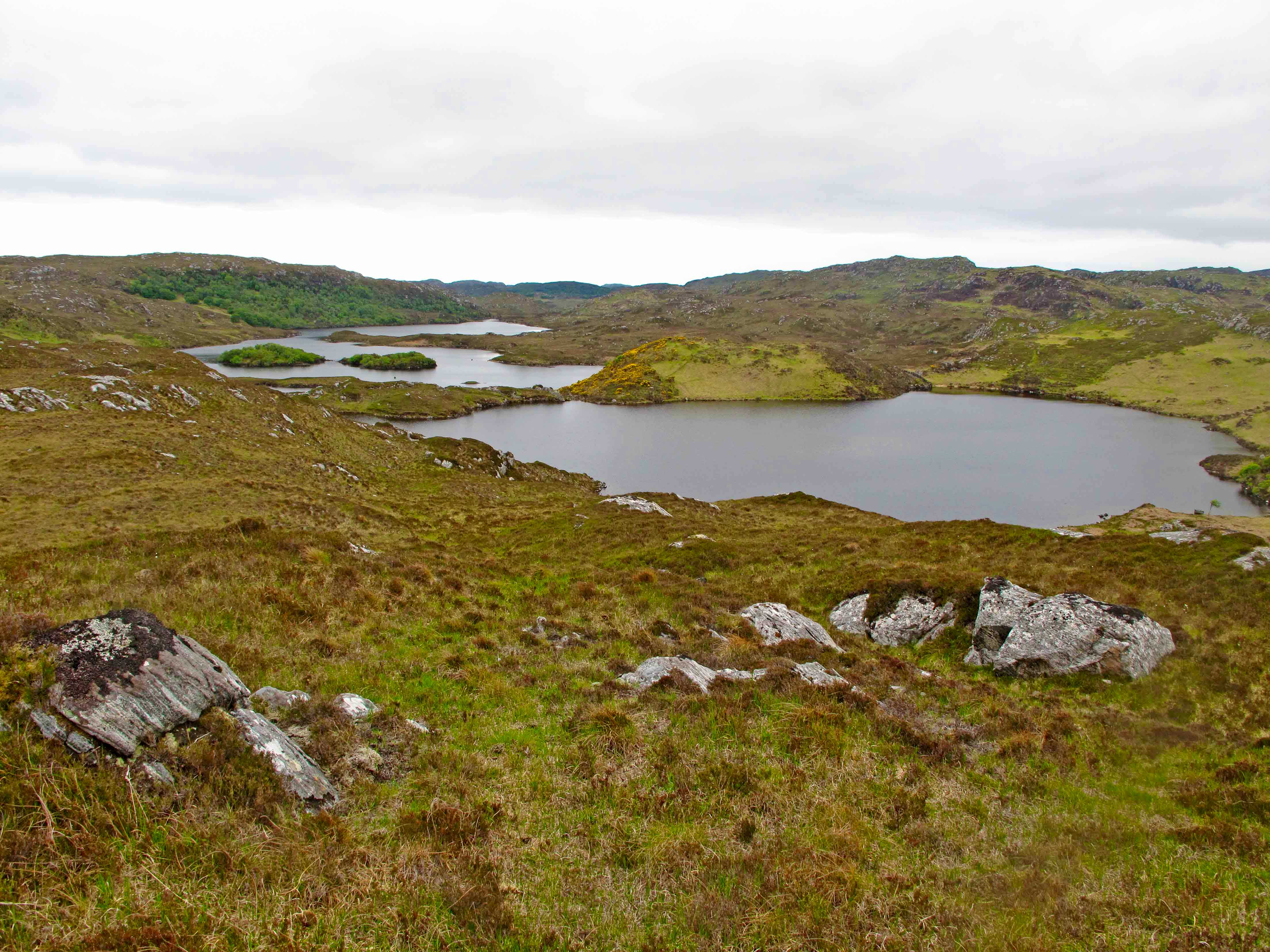
- Loch an Tuir with Loch an Tuirc lying beyond it.

- Location in Sutherland
- Location: NC11112588
- Coordinates: 58.1813°N 5.2123°W
- Type: freshwater loch
- Primary outflows: Allt Loch an Tuirc
- Max. length: 1.287 km (0.800 mi)
- Max. width: 0.32 km (0.20 mi)
- Surface area: 19 ha (47 acres)
- Average depth: 10.4 ft (3.2 m)
- Max. depth: 39 ft (12 m)
- Water volume: 21,433,001 ft^{3} (606,915.0 m^{3})
- Shore length^{1}: 4 km (2.5 mi)
- Surface elevation: 54 m (177 ft)
- Max. temperature: 53 °F (12 °C)
- Min. temperature: 50 °F (10 °C)
- Islands: 2 main islands and many rocky islets
- ^{1} Shore length is not a well-defined measure.

Loch an Tuirc is a large irregular shaped, shallow loch, located about two miles north-by-north-east of Lochinver in the Assynt district of Sutherland, Highland, Scotland. It is one of three lochs in Scotland with the same name. Loch an Tuirc is located in an area known as the Assynt-Coigach National Scenic Area, one of 40 such areas in Scotland.

== Geography ==
Loch an Tuirc is an area of outstanding natural beauty in area of wilderness landscape of moorland, bogs, and lochs and lochans. To the west is the small Loch Beannach, to the east is Loch Cròcach. The small loch of Loch an Tuir sits to the north. About five miles to the west is the Loch Assynt.

Water flows from Loch Cròcach into Loch an Tuirc and is drained out via Allt Loch an Tuirc into Manse Loch in the southwest.

== Fishing ==
Loch an Tuirc and Manse Loch are excellent for fly fishing. Grouse, Claret, Woodcock, Hare-lug and silver butcher are the best fly for the loch.
