= Nuphar × saijoensis =

Scientific classification
- Kingdom: Plantae
- Clade: Tracheophytes
- Clade: Angiosperms
- Order: Nymphaeales
- Family: Nymphaeaceae
- Genus: Nuphar
- Section: Nuphar sect. Nuphar
- Species: N. × saijoensis

Binomial name
- Nuphar × saijoensis (Shimoda) Padgett & Shimoda
- Nuphar × saijoensis is endemic to Japan

Synonyms
- Nuphar japonica var. saijoensis Shimoda

Species of perennial aquatic plant

Nuphar × saijoensis is a species of rhizomatous aquatic plant endemic to Japan. It is a natural hybrid of Nuphar japonica and Nuphar pumila, or Nuphar japonica and Nuphar pumila subsp. oguraensis.

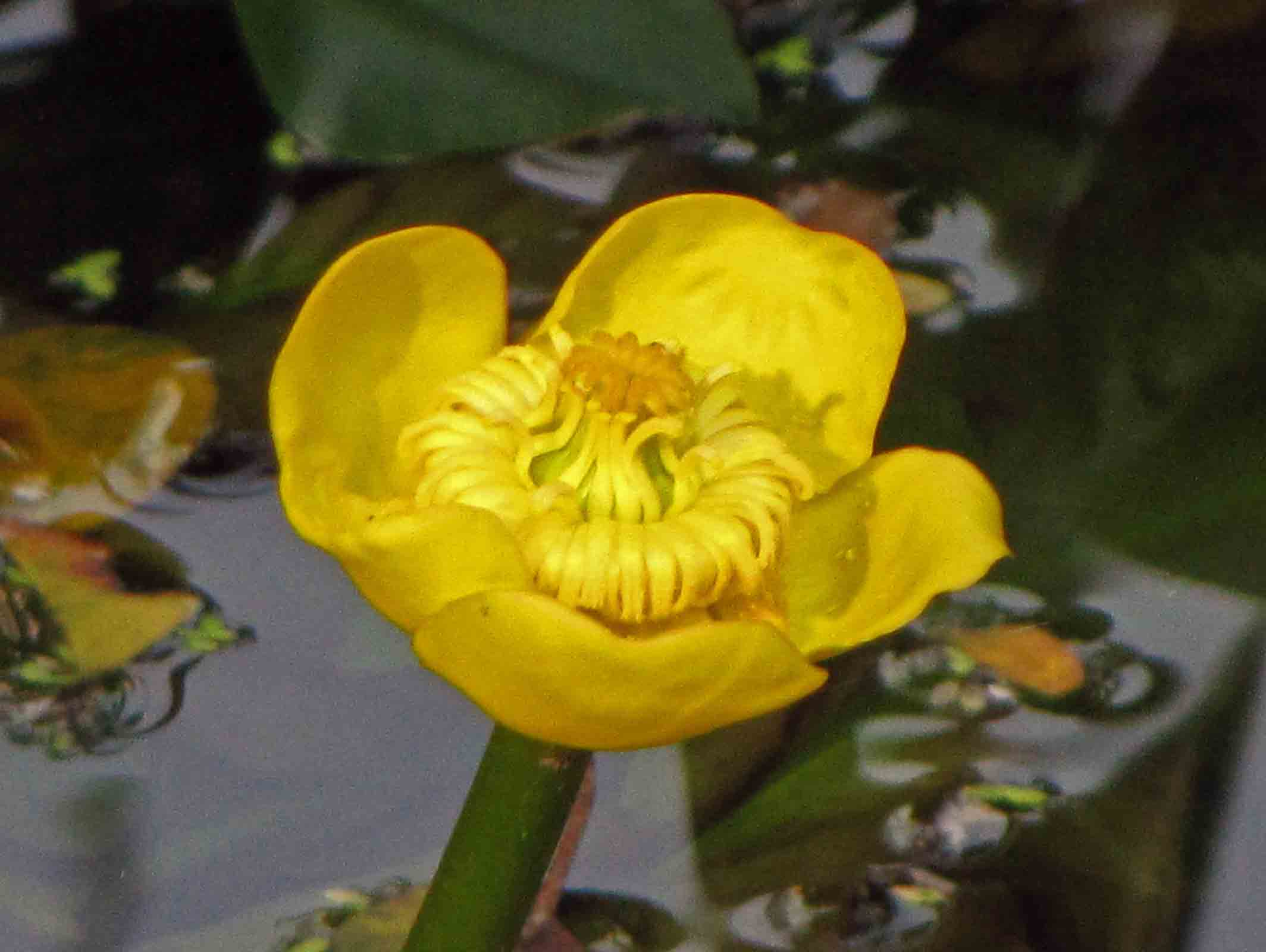
Nuphar japonica DC., one of the parent species

== Description ==
=== Generative characteristics ===
The anthers are strongly recurved.

== Reproduction ==
=== Generative reproduction ===
It is fertile, but only very few, mostly unviable seeds are produced with an average of 29 seeds per fruit.

== Taxonomy ==
=== Publication ===
It was first described as the variety Nuphar japonica var. saijoensis Shimoda by Michiko Shimoda in 1991. Later, it was treated as the natural hybrid Nuphar × saijoensis (Shimoda) Padgett & Shimoda published by Donald Jay Padgett and Michiko Shimoda in 2002.

=== Type specimen ===
The type specimen was collected by Michiko Shimoda in Higashi-hiroshima City, Hiroshima Prefecture, Japan on the 27th of June 1989.

=== Natural hybridisation ===
Different sources list different species involved, depending on the recognition of Nuphar taxa. Nuphar japonica is listed as a parental species in all sources. The other parental species is either listed as Nuphar oguraensis (syn. Nuphar pumila subsp. oguraensis), or as Nuphar pumila. In the original publication the second parental species Nuphar oguraensis is listed as Nuphar pumila subsp. oguraensis.

== Conservation ==
It is endangered.

== Ecology ==
=== Habitat ===
It only occurs in aquatic habitats, such as irrigation ponds, of the Saijo Basin, western Japan.
