= Nuphar submersa =

Scientific classification
- Kingdom: Plantae
- Clade: Tracheophytes
- Clade: Angiosperms
- Order: Nymphaeales
- Family: Nymphaeaceae
- Genus: Nuphar
- Section: Nuphar sect. Nuphar
- Species: N. submersa

Binomial name
- Nuphar submersa Shiga & Kadono
- Nuphar submersa is endemic to Japan

Species of perennial aquatic plant

Nuphar submersa is a species of rhizomatous aquatic plant endemic to Japan.

== Description ==
=== Vegetative characteristics ===
Nuphar submersa is a perennial aquatic herb with slim, branching, prostrate rhizomes. It rarely produced floating leaves. The petiolate, narrowly oblong-triangular, membranous submerged leaves with an undulate margin are 10-18 cm long, and 2-5 cm wide. The petiolate, narrowly ovate floating leaves have a cordate-saggitate base. The petioles are flattened.

=== Generative characteristics ===
The 2-3 cm wide, pedunculated flowers emerge above the water surface. They have five obovate, yellow sepals, which are 1-2 cm long. The 5-7 mm long petals are spatulate. The stamens are recurved after anthesis. The gynoecium consists of many fused carpels. The red, ovoid, 2-3 cm long fruit bears numerous ovoid, 3.5-4.5 mm long, and 2.5-3.5 mm wide seeds.

== Reproduction ==
=== Vegetative reproduction ===
Nuphar submersa can reproduce clonally.

=== Generative reproduction ===
Flowering occurs from June to October.

== Taxonomy ==
=== Publication ===
It was first described by Takashi Shiga and Yasuro Kadono in 2006.

=== Type specimen ===
The type species was collected by T. Shiga at an altitude of 240 m in Koshiro, Imaichi-shi, Tochigi prefecture, Japan on the 29th of September 2004.

=== Natural hybridisation ===
Together with Nuphar japonica DC., it forms the natural hybrid Nuphar × fluminalis Shiga & Kadono.

== Etymology ==
The specific epithet submersa, from the Latin submersa, means submerged.

== Conservation ==
It is critically endangered.

== Ecology ==
=== Habitat ===
It occurs in rivers and streams.
