= Nuphar × fluminalis =

Scientific classification
- Kingdom: Plantae
- Clade: Tracheophytes
- Clade: Angiosperms
- Order: Nymphaeales
- Family: Nymphaeaceae
- Genus: Nuphar
- Section: Nuphar sect. Nuphar
- Species: N. × fluminalis

Binomial name
- Nuphar × fluminalis Shiga & Kadono
- Nuphar × fluminalis is endemic to Japan

Species of perennial aquatic plant

Nuphar × fluminalis is a species of rhizomatous aquatic plant endemic to Japan. It is a natural hybrid of Nuphar japonica and Nuphar submersa.

== Description ==
=== Vegetative characteristics ===
Nuphar × fluminalis has an intermediate appearance and falls between Nuphar japonica and Nuphar submersa. The submerged leaves are ovate.

=== Generative characteristics ===
The filaments are recurved. The anthers display orange-red colouration. The stigmatic disk, as well as the fruit, also display orange-red colouration.

== Reproduction ==
=== Generative reproduction ===
Sexual reproduction occurs within this hybrid.

== Taxonomy ==
=== Publication ===
It was first described by Takashi Shiga and Yasuro Kadono in 2007.

== Etymology ==
The nothospecific epithet fluminalis, from the Latin fluminalis, means stream or river.

== Conservation ==
It is critically endangered. Only four populations are known.

== Ecology ==
=== Habitat ===
It occurs in streams and rivers.
