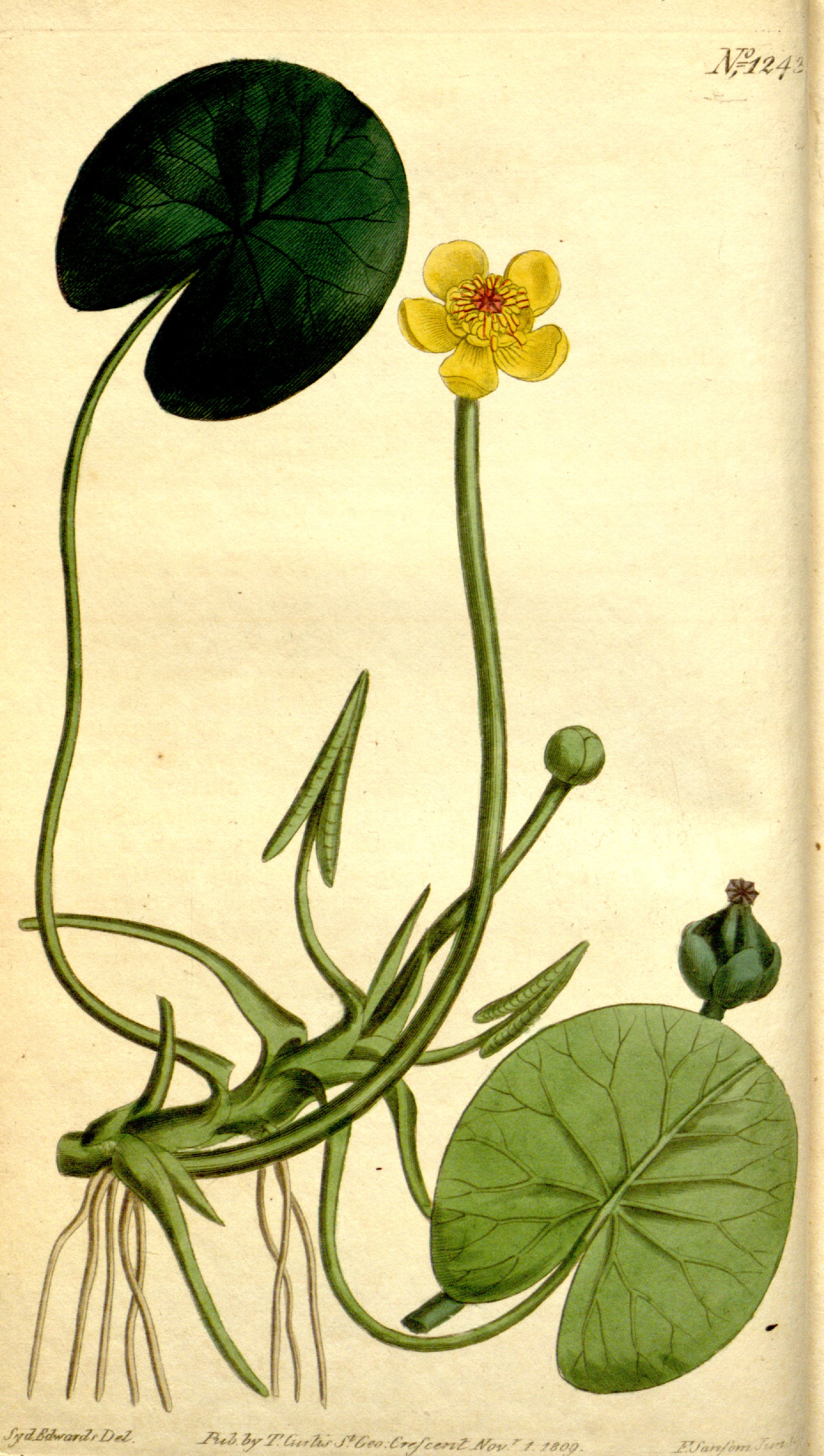
- 1809 illustration

Scientific classification
- Kingdom: Plantae
- Clade: Tracheophytes
- Clade: Angiosperms
- Order: Nymphaeales
- Family: Nymphaeaceae
- Genus: Nuphar
- Section: Nuphar sect. Nuphar
- Species: N. microphylla

Binomial name
- Nuphar microphylla (Pers.) Fernald

Synonyms
- List: Nenuphar minimum (Willd.) Link; Nuphar kalmianum Aiton; Nuphar lutea var. kalmiana (Michx.) Torr. & A.Gray; Nuphar luteum var. pumilum (Timm) E.O.Beal; Nuphar microphylla f. multisepala Lakela; Nuphar minima (Willd.) Sm.; Nymphaea kalmiana Sims; Nymphaea lutea var. kalmiana Michx.; Nymphaea lutea var. minima Willd.; Nymphaea microphylla Pers.; Nymphozanthus microphyllus (Pers.) Fernald; Nyphar luteum var. kalmianum (Michaux) Walpers

= Nuphar microphylla =

Species of plant

Nuphar microphylla is a perennial, rhizomatous, aquatic herb found in North America. It is listed as a special concern and believed extirpated in Connecticut.

== Description ==
=== Vegetative characteristics ===
Nuphar microphylla is a perennial, rhizomatous, aquatic herb with 1–2 cm wide rhizomes. The ovate to broadly elliptic, 3.5–10(–13) cm long, and 3.5–7.5(–8.5) cm wide floating leaves have a deep sinus. The abaxial leaf surface is often purple. The leaf venation is pinnate.

=== Generative characteristics ===
The small, yellow to green, 1–2 cm wide flowers float on the water surface. The red stigmatic disks are 2.5–7 mm wide.

== Cytology ==
The chromosome count is 2n = 34.

== Taxonomy ==
It was first published as Nymphaea microphylla Pers. by Christiaan Hendrik Persoon in 1806. It was placed into the genus Nuphar Sm. as Nuphar microphylla (Pers.) Fernald published by Merritt Lyndon Fernald in 1917. It is placed in the section Nuphar sect. Nuphar. It is a parent species of the natural hybrid Nuphar × rubrodisca Morong.

=== Etymology ===
The specific epithet microphylla means small-leaved.

== Ecology ==
=== Habitat ===
It occurs in ponds, marshes, and lakes.

== Conservation ==
It is endangered in the US-american states Pennsylvania, Michigan, Massachusetts, and New Hampshire. It is susceptible to pollution, e.g., by herbicides meant to combat invasive weeds. It is also threatened by invasive plants.
