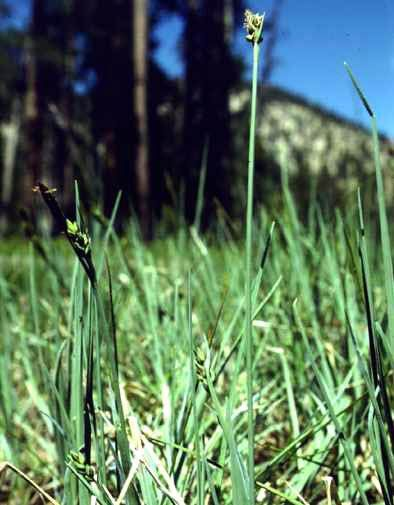

Conservation status
- Secure (NatureServe)

Scientific classification
- Kingdom: Plantae
- Clade: Tracheophytes
- Clade: Angiosperms
- Clade: Monocots
- Clade: Commelinids
- Order: Poales
- Family: Cyperaceae
- Genus: Carex
- Species: C. livida

Binomial name
- Carex livida (Wahlenb.) Willd.

Synonyms
- Carex limosa subsp. livida (Wahlenb.); Carex livida var. typica (Fernald); Edritria livida (Wahlenb.) Raf.; Carex confertospicata (Boeckeler); Carex fujitae (Kudô); Carex grayana (Dewey); Carex livida var. grayana (Dewey) Fernald; Carex livida var. radicalis (Paine); Carex livida var. rufiniformis (Fernald); Carex lividulla (Nakai)

= Carex livida =

Species of plant in the sedge family

Carex livida is a species of tussock-forming, grasslike plant in the family Cyperaceae. It is also known by the common names livid sedge and pale sedge.

== Description ==
This sedge forms small clumps of stems up to 50 to 55 centimeters tall. The stiff, leathery leaves are a pale, waxy blue-gray and have channels on their surfaces. The inflorescence contains separate pistillate and staminate spikes. The plant spreads mostly by sprouting from its rhizome, but it also produces seed.

== Distribution and habitat ==
It has a scattered, interrupted circumboreal distribution, occurring throughout much of Eurasia and northern North America. It also occurs in Panama and South America. It is extirpated in California.

This plant grows in wet substrates with groundwater at the surface. The soils are often calcareous and rich in nitrogen. It can typically be found in fens and bogs with sphagnum mosses and other sedges.
