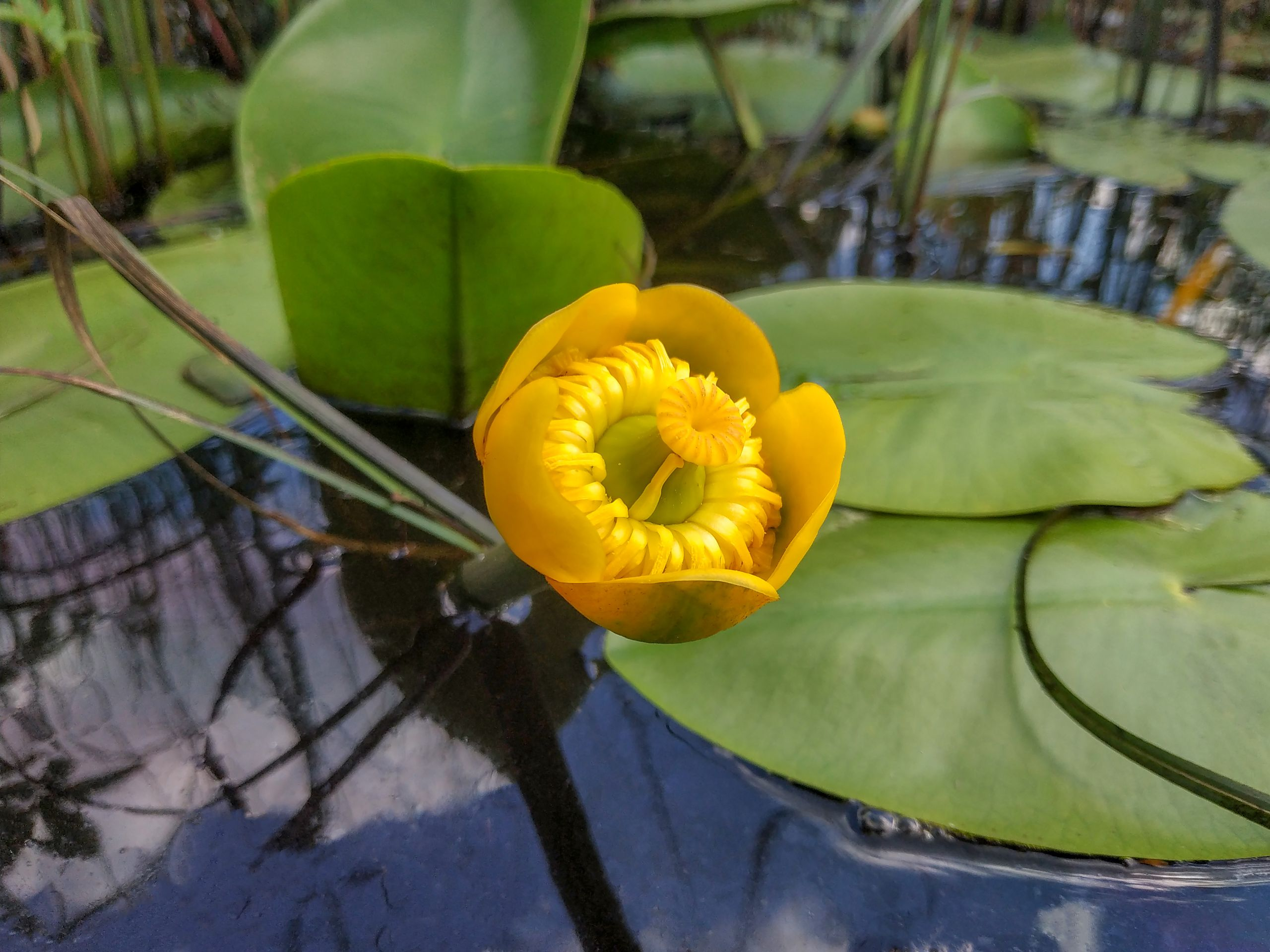
- Nuphar lutea

Scientific classification
- Kingdom: Plantae
- Clade: Tracheophytes
- Clade: Angiosperms
- Order: Nymphaeales
- Family: Nymphaeaceae
- Genus: Nuphar
- Section: Nuphar sect. Nuphar (Autonym)

Type species
- Nuphar lutea (L.) Sm.

Species
- See here

= Nuphar sect. Nuphar =

Section of the genus Nuphar in the family Nymphaeaceae

Nuphar sect. Nuphar is a section within the genus Nuphar native to Eurasia, in addition to a single North American species Nuphar microphylla.

== Description ==
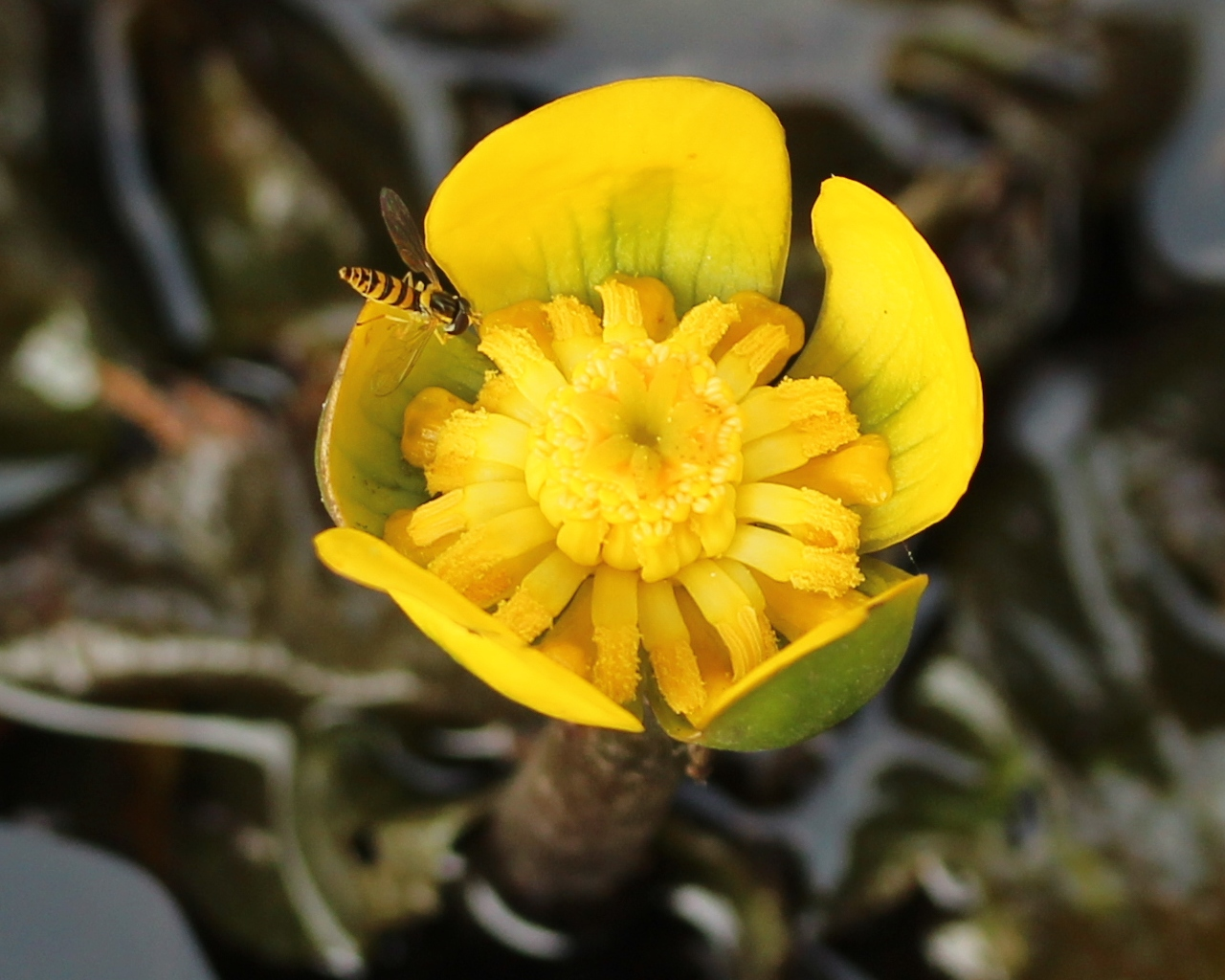
Nuphar subintegerrima

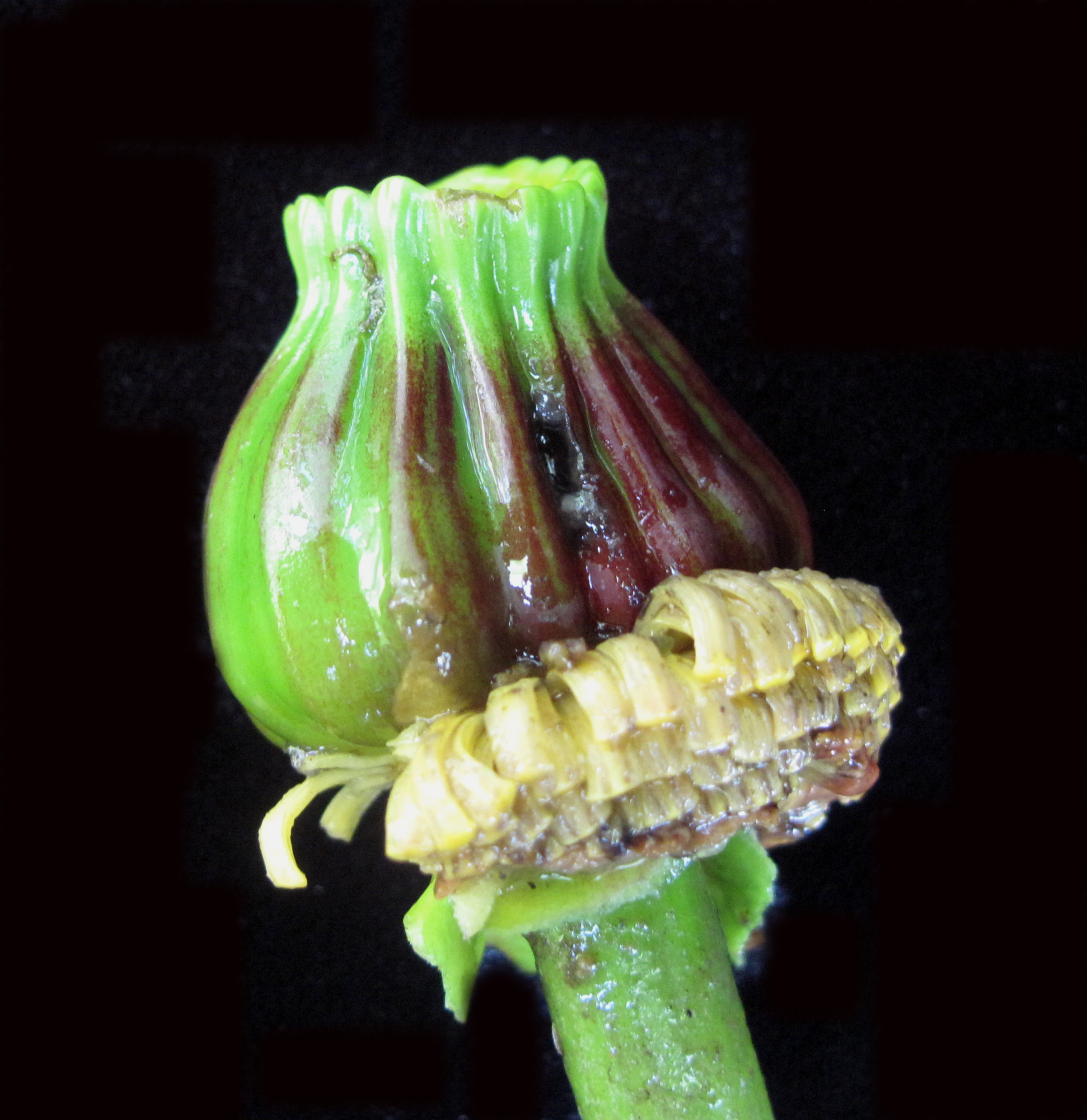
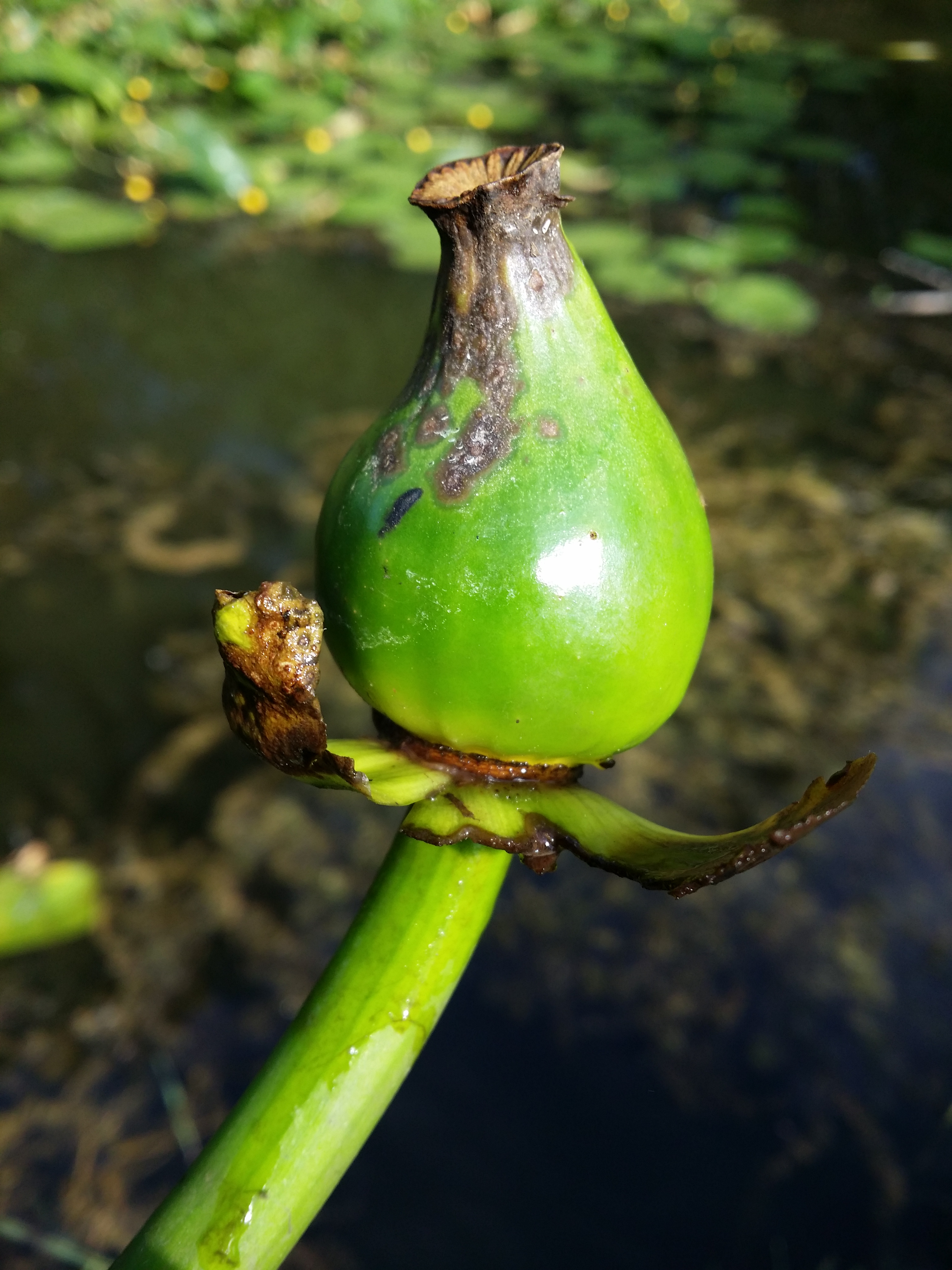
Broad-necked, deeply furrowed fruit of Nuphar sect. Astylus (left) and smooth, urceolate fruit with a slim, elongate neck of Nuphar sect. Nuphar (right)

=== Vegetative characteristics ===
Nuphar sect. Nuphar are herbaceous plants.

=== Generative characteristics ===
The flowers have five sepals. The anthers are shorter or as long as half of the filament. The margin of the stigmatic disk is lobed, or rarely entire. The urceolate fruit has an elongate neck.

== Taxonomy ==
The autonymous section was created when Donald Jay Padgett described Nuphar sect. Astylus Padgett in 1999. The type species of Nuphar sect. Nuphar is Nuphar lutea (L.) Sm.

=== Species ===
- Nuphar × fluminalis Shiga & Kadono
- Nuphar japonica DC.
- Nuphar lutea (L.) Sm.
- Nuphar microphylla (Pers.) Fernald
- Nuphar oguraensis Miki
- Nuphar pumila (Timm) DC.
- Nuphar pumila subsp. sinensis (Hand.-Mazz.) Padgett
- Nuphar × saijoensis (Shimoda) Padgett & Shimoda
- Nuphar saikokuensis Shiga & Kadono
- Nuphar × spenneriana Gaudin
- Nuphar subintegerrima (Casp.) Makino
- Nuphar submersa Shiga & Kadono

== Distribution ==
It occurs in Eurasia, and North America, where only one species, Nuphar microphylla, is present. The section originated and diversified in Eastern Asia.
