= Nuphar × spenneriana =

Scientific classification
- Kingdom: Plantae
- Clade: Tracheophytes
- Clade: Angiosperms
- Order: Nymphaeales
- Family: Nymphaeaceae
- Genus: Nuphar
- Section: Nuphar sect. Nuphar
- Species: N. × spenneriana

Binomial name
- Nuphar × spenneriana Gaudin

Synonyms
- List: Nuphar pumila subsp. spenneriana (Gaudin) Nyman; Nuphar pumila var. spenneriana (Gaudin) Rouy & Foucaud; Nuphar × intermedia Ledeb.; Nuphar × intermedia f. chlorocephala Fr.Römer; Nymphaea × intermedia (Ledeb.) Weiker ex Rchb.; Nymphaea × intermedia var. hirtella J.Schust.; Nymphaea × intermedia var. media J.Schust.; Nymphaea × intermedia var. polypetala J.Schust.; Nymphaea × intermedia var. sublutea J.Schust.; Nymphozanthus × intermedius (Ledeb.) Fernald

Species of perennial aquatic plant

Nuphar × spenneriana is a species of rhizomatous aquatic plant native to Europe. It is a natural hybrid of Nuphar lutea and Nuphar pumila.

The parent species of the natural hybrid Nuphar × spenneriana Gaudin

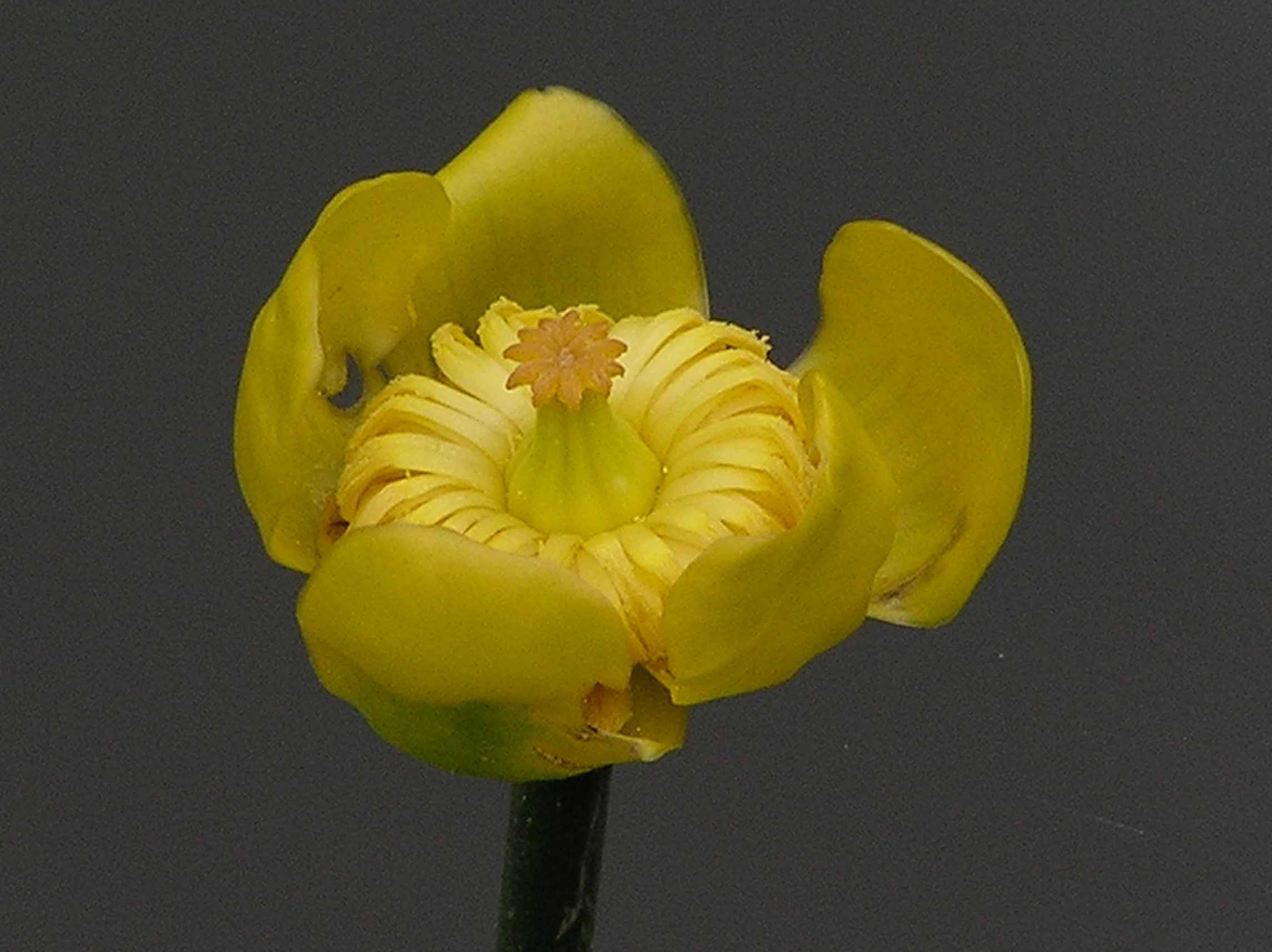
Nuphar pumila (Timm) DC.

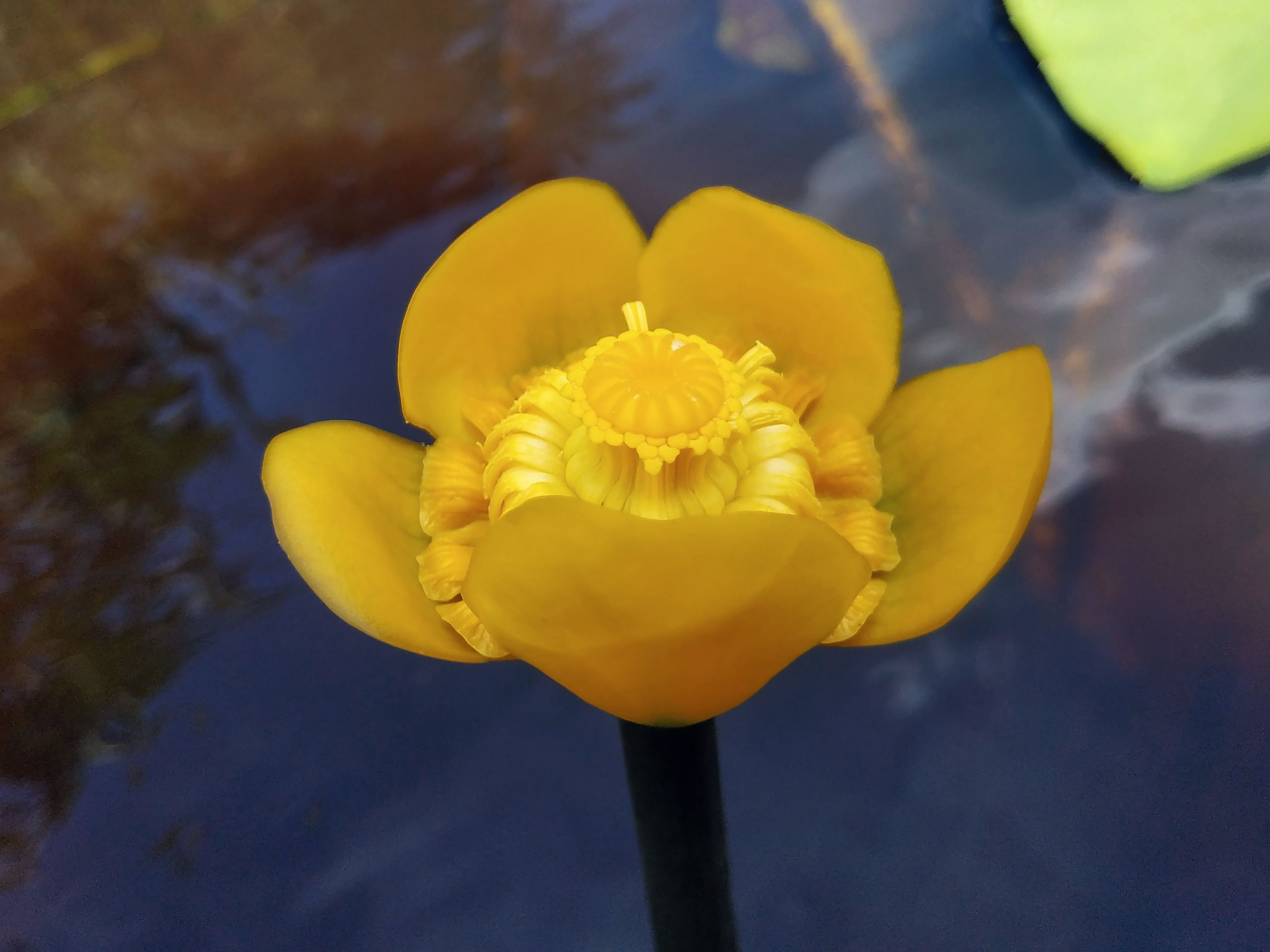
Nuphar lutea (L.) Sm.

== Description ==
=== Vegetative characteristics ===
Nuphar × spenneriana is a perennial, rhizomatous, aquatic plant. The leaf blade is 7–18 cm long, and 5–14 cm wide. The abaxial leaf surface has trichomes towards the leaf margin but trichomes are absent towards the centre. Trichomes also may be absent entirely. The leaf has 15-22 primary nerves. The petiole is 3–7 mm wide.

=== Generative characteristics ===
The sepals are 25 mm long, and 20 mm wide. The petals are 8 mm long. The androecium consists of 60-100 stamens. The up to 9.2 mm wide, slightly crenate stigmatic disc has 9-15 rays.

=== Cytology ===
The chromosome count is 2n = 34.

== Reproduction ==
=== Generative reproduction ===
It is fertile, but the pollen may be less viable. Pollen fertility can reach 73%. However, it can also be as low as 14% in F1 hybrids. In another case, a female sterility rate of 80%, and a male sterility rate of 85% have been reported. The seeds grow more rapidly than those of the parent species.

== Taxonomy ==
=== Publication ===
It was first described by Jean François Aimé Théophile Philippe Gaudin in 1828.

=== Natural hybridisation ===
It likely arose 10 000 years ago, when both parent species came into contact. Natural hybridisation is a threat to Nuphar pumila, one of the parent species, as the hybrid replaces populations of Nuphar pumila. In Eastern Europe and Asia observations of intermediate plants are rare. In Western Europe hybridisation appears to have played a more significant role.

== Etymology ==
The nothospecific epithet spenneriana honours Fridolin Carl Leopold Spenner (1798-1841).

== Ecology ==
=== Habitat ===
It occurs in rivers, lakes, streams, and pools.
