= Neoschoenobia =

Scientific classification
- Kingdom: Animalia
- Phylum: Arthropoda
- Class: Insecta
- Order: Lepidoptera
- Family: Crambidae
- Subfamily: Acentropinae
- Genus: Neoschoenobia; Hampson, 1900

Synonyms
- Eranistis Meyrick, 1910

Genus of moths

Neoschoenobia is a genus of moths of the family Crambidae.

== Species ==
- Neoschoenobia caustodes (Meyrick, 1934)
- Neoschoenobia testacealis Hampson, 1900

== Former species ==
- Neoschoenobia decoloralis Hampson, 1919
