= Neoschoenobia caustodes =

Scientific classification
- Kingdom: Animalia
- Phylum: Arthropoda
- Class: Insecta
- Order: Lepidoptera
- Family: Crambidae
- Genus: Neoschoenobia
- Species: N. caustodes

Binomial name
- Neoschoenobia caustodes (Meyrick, 1934)

Synonyms
- Schoenobius caustodes Meyrick, 1934

Species of moth

Neoschoenobia caustodes is a species of moth in the family Crambidae. It was described by Edward Meyrick in 1934. It is found in Australia, where it has been recorded from New South Wales.
