= Nuphar pumila subsp. sinensis =

Scientific classification
- Kingdom: Plantae
- Clade: Tracheophytes
- Clade: Angiosperms
- Order: Nymphaeales
- Family: Nymphaeaceae
- Genus: Nuphar
- Section: Nuphar sect. Nuphar
- Species: N. pumila
- Subspecies: N. p. subsp. sinensis

Trinomial name
- Nuphar pumila subsp. sinensis (Hand.-Mazz.) Padgett
- It is native to China

Synonyms
- Nuphar sinensis Hand.-Mazz.

Species of water lily

Nuphar pumila subsp. sinensis is a subspecies of Nuphar pumila native to China.

== Description ==
=== Vegetative characteristics ===
It is a small plant with 1–3 cm wide rhizomes. The green, elliptic to ovate floating leaf is 9.3–15.5(–17) cm long, and 6.9–12.3 cm wide. The abaxial leaf surface is glabrous to densely pubescent. The compressed petiole is 40 cm long, and 3–5 mm wide.

=== Generative characteristics ===
The 2–4.5(–6) cm wide flower has a 3.5–5 mm wide peduncle. The 5 yellow, oblong to obovate sepals with an rounded apex are up to 2.5 cm long. The yellow, thin, spatulate to emarginate petals are 7 mm long. The stamens have 3.5–6 mm long anthers. The gynoecium consists of 8–13 carpels. The green stigmatic disk is 5–6 mm wide. The urceolate, green, 2–2.7 cm long, and 1.5–2 cm wide fruit bears brown, ovate, 3 mm long seeds.

== Taxonomy ==
It was first published as Nuphar sinensis Hand.-Mazz. by Heinrich Raphael Eduard Handel-Mazzetti in 1926. It was included in the species Nuphar pumila (Timm) DC. as Nuphar pumila subsp. sinensis (Hand.-Mazz.) Padgett published by Donald Jay Padgett in 1999 based on morphological similarities. It is placed in the section Nuphar sect. Nuphar.

== Etymology ==
The subspecific epithet sinensis means "from China".

== Ecology ==
=== Habitat ===
It occurs in ponds, lakes, and bogs in the warm-temperate region of southeastern China.
