= Neoschoenobia testacealis =

Scientific classification
- Kingdom: Animalia
- Phylum: Arthropoda
- Class: Insecta
- Order: Lepidoptera
- Family: Crambidae
- Genus: Neoschoenobia
- Species: N. testacealis

Binomial name
- Neoschoenobia testacealis Hampson, 1900

Synonyms
- Neoschoenobia decoloralis Hampson, 1919

Species of moth

Neoschoenobia testacealis, the flower stalk-boring moth, is a species of moth in the family Crambidae. It was described by George Hampson in 1900. It is found in China, the Russian Far East and Japan.

The larvae feed on Nuphar subintegerrima. They bore the flower stalks of their host plant.
