= Nuphar oguraensis =

Scientific classification
- Kingdom: Plantae
- Clade: Tracheophytes
- Clade: Angiosperms
- Order: Nymphaeales
- Family: Nymphaeaceae
- Genus: Nuphar
- Section: Nuphar sect. Nuphar
- Species: N. oguraensis

Binomial name
- Nuphar oguraensis Miki
- Nuphar oguraensis is endemic to Japan

Synonyms
- Nuphar pumila subsp. oguraensis (Miki) Padgett; Nuphar oguraensis var. akiensis Shimoda

Species of perennial aquatic plant

Nuphar oguraensis is a species of rhizomatous aquatic plant endemic to Japan.

== Description ==
=== Vegetative characteristics ===
The petiolate, green, ovate floating leaves are 7.5-11.5 cm long, and 6-9 cm wide. The petiole is 1-3 mm wide. The petiole is semi-hollow.

=== Generative characteristics ===
The flowers are 1.7-2.5 cm wide. The 2.5-3 cm long, and 1.5-2 cm wide fruit bears brown, 3.5-4 mm long, and 2.5 mm wide seeds.

== Reproduction ==
=== Generative reproduction ===
Flowering occurs from June to October.

== Taxonomy ==
=== Publication ===
It was first described by Shigeru Miki in 1934.

=== Type specimen ===
The lectotype is an illustration of this species in the original publication by Shigeru Miki.

=== Natural hybridisation ===
It has been speculated to be of hybrid origin involving Nuphar pumila and Nuphar japonica.

== Conservation ==
It is threatened by urbanisation and land development. It is regarded as a vulnerable species.

== Ecology ==
=== Habitat ===
It occurs in rivers, lakes, ponds, and ditches.
