= Nupharamine =

Names
- IUPAC name 4-[(2S,3R,6S)-6-(Furan-3-yl)-3-methylpiperidin-2-yl]-2-methylbutan-2-ol

Identifiers
| CAS Number | 17812-38-3 |
| 3D model (JSmol) | Interactive image |
| ChEBI | CHEBI:81107 |
| ChemSpider | 9087243 |
| KEGG | C17464 |
| PubChem CID | 10911986 |
| UNII | Z84FV92N4N |
| CompTox Dashboard (EPA) | DTXSID501045468 |
- InChI: InChI=1S/C15H25NO2/c1-11-4-5-14(12-7-9-18-10-12)16-13(11)6-8-15(2,3)17/h7,9-11,13-14,16-17H,4-6,8H2,1-3H3/t11-,13+,14+/m1/s1 Key: BHBDCRJVCZOPFM-XBFCOCLRSA-N
- SMILES: C[C@@H]1CC[C@H](N[C@H]1CCC(C)(C)O)C2=COC=C2

Properties
| Chemical formula | C_{15}H_{25}NO_{2} |
| Molar mass | 251.370 g·mol^{−1} |
- Except where otherwise noted, data are given for materials in their standard state (at 25 °C [77 °F], 100 kPa). Infobox references

Nupharamine is an alkaloid found in Nuphar japonica and in castoreum.
