= Nuphar × rubrodisca =

Conservation status
- Apparently Secure (NatureServe)

Scientific classification
- Kingdom: Plantae
- Clade: Tracheophytes
- Clade: Angiosperms
- Order: Nymphaeales
- Family: Nymphaeaceae
- Genus: Nuphar
- Species: N. × rubrodisca

Binomial name
- Nuphar × rubrodisca Morong
- Nuphar × rubrodisca occurs in Canada and the USA

Synonyms
- List: Castalia × rubrodisca (Morong) Greene; Nuphar lutea subsp. rubrodisca (Morong) Hellq. & Wiersema; Nymphaea × rubrodisca (Morong) Greene; Nymphozanthus × rubrodiscus (Morong) Fernald; Nuphar advena var. hybrida Peck; Nuphar × hybrida (Peck) Bergmans; Nymphaea × fletcheri G.Lawson; Nymphaea × hybrida (Peck) Peck

Species of perennial aquatic plant

Nuphar × rubrodisca is a species of rhizomatous aquatic plant native to Canada and the USA. It is a natural hybrid of Nuphar variegata and Nuphar microphylla.

The parent species of the natural hybrid Nuphar × rubrodisca Morong

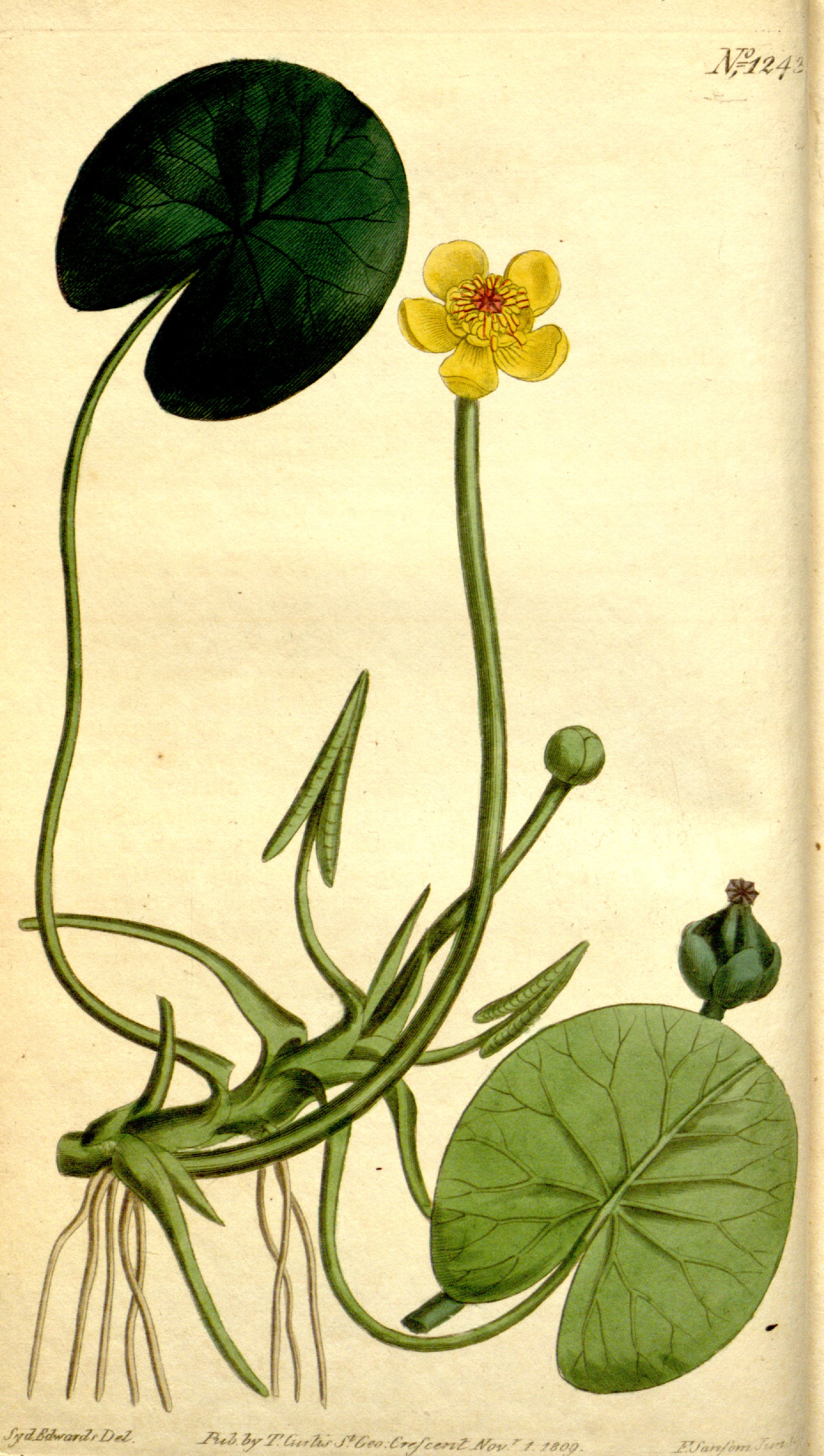
Nuphar microphylla (Pers.) Fernald

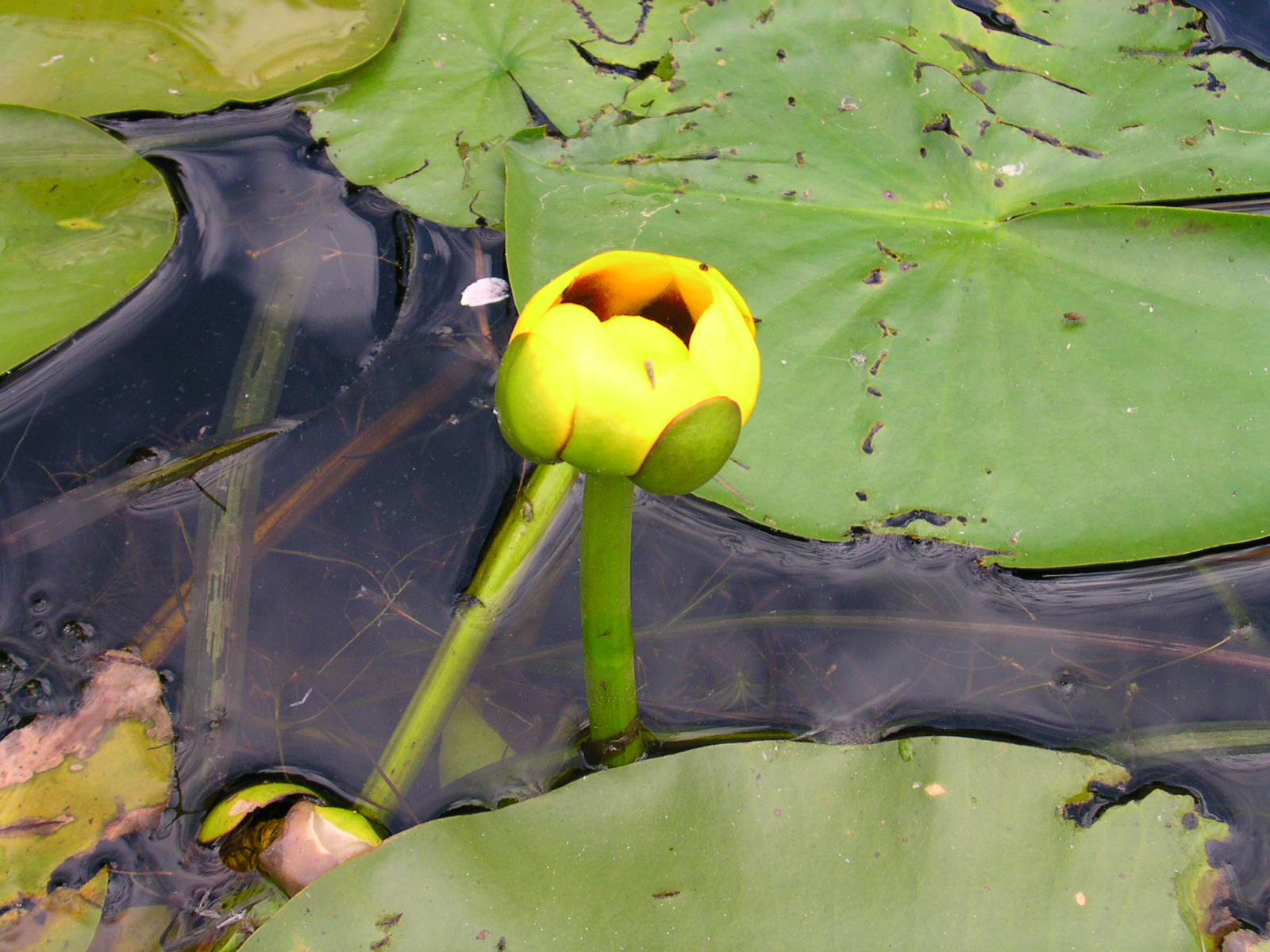
Nuphar variegata Engelm. ex Durand

== Description ==
=== Vegetative characteristics ===
Nuphar × rubrodisca has 1–2.5 cm wide rhizomes. The petiolate leaves float on the water surface, or are more rarely submersed. The submerged leaves are orbicular.

=== Generative characteristics ===
The red stigmatic disk has 8-15 stigmatic rays.

== Reproduction ==
=== Vegetative reproduction ===
It can reproduce vegetatively through rhizome fragments.

=== Generative reproduction ===
It can be sterile or fertile. The fertility rates are much lower than those of the parental species.

== Taxonomy ==
=== Publication ===
It was first described by Thomas Morong in 1886.

=== Natural hybridisation ===
Hybridisation events of both parental species are believed to have occurred many times independently from each other.

== Conservation ==
The NatureServe conservation status is T4 Apparently Secure.

== Ecology ==
=== Habitat ===
It occurs in streams, tidal waters, ponds, and lakes at elevations of 0–400 m above sea level. It occurs almost exclusively within the overlapping ranges of the parental species.
