= Loch Beannach, Assynt =

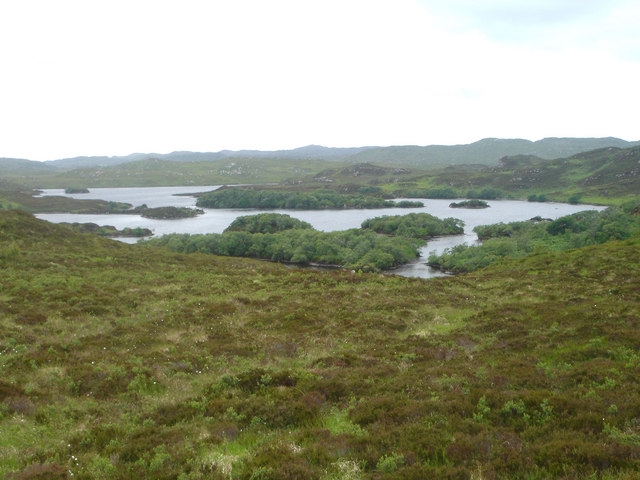
- Loch Beannach in the Little Assynt Estate. Native woodland survives on the islands

- Location within Sutherland
- Location: NC13852637
- Coordinates: 58.18889999°N 5.16194439°W
- Type: freshwater loch
- Max. length: 2.00 km (1.24 mi)
- Max. width: 0.53 km (0.33 mi)
- Surface area: 49 ha (120 acres)
- Average depth: 13.45 ft (4.10 m)
- Max. depth: 32 ft (9.8 m)
- Water volume: 70,883,210.58 ft^{3} (2,007,189.000 m^{3})
- Shore length^{1}: 100 km (62 mi)
- Surface elevation: 68 m (223 ft)
- Max. temperature: 52.5 °F (11.4 °C)
- Min. temperature: 52.00 °F (11.11 °C)
- Islands: 21
- ^{1} Shore length is not a well-defined measure.

Loch Beannach is a small v-shaped loch, located 2 miles to the west of Loch Assynt and 3 miles northeast of Lochinver within the Assynt area of Sutherland, Scotland. The loch is located in an area known as the Assynt-Coigach National Scenic Area, one of 40 such areas in Scotland.

== Conservation ==
The northeastern part of the loch is a designated Site of Special Scientific Interest (SSSI). The specific area covered are the Downy Birch woodland on eight islands within the loch. The woodland is a prime example of the type that would have covered the area extensively in the past. The area of the site SSSI overlaps with the areas general Assynt Lochs SSSI, that is notable for its population of black-throated divers where the loch is one of the nesting sites for this species. The Loch is also a nesting site for common gull, European golden plover, meadow pipit, red grouse, skylark, barn swallow and wheatear. The water-lily Nuphar pumila grows around the loch.

== Township ==
To the east of the loch is a former crofting township that was cleared during the 19th Century. Its name was never discovered. It consists of 11 former crofts, consisting of sizes of 3.0m by 2.0m to 16.0m by 5.0m in two groups. The evidence for lazy bed cultivation is still visible. On the stream that issues from Loch an t- Sabhail are the remains of a corn-mill and a dam further upstream.

== Geography ==
Loch Beannach flows along an unnamed stream into Loch Bad nan Aighean directly south. The ground around the loch is hummocky with stretches of peat bog and water lying between bare rocky knolls.

Directly to the north-west, the loch is overlooked by the triple peak's of Quinag.
