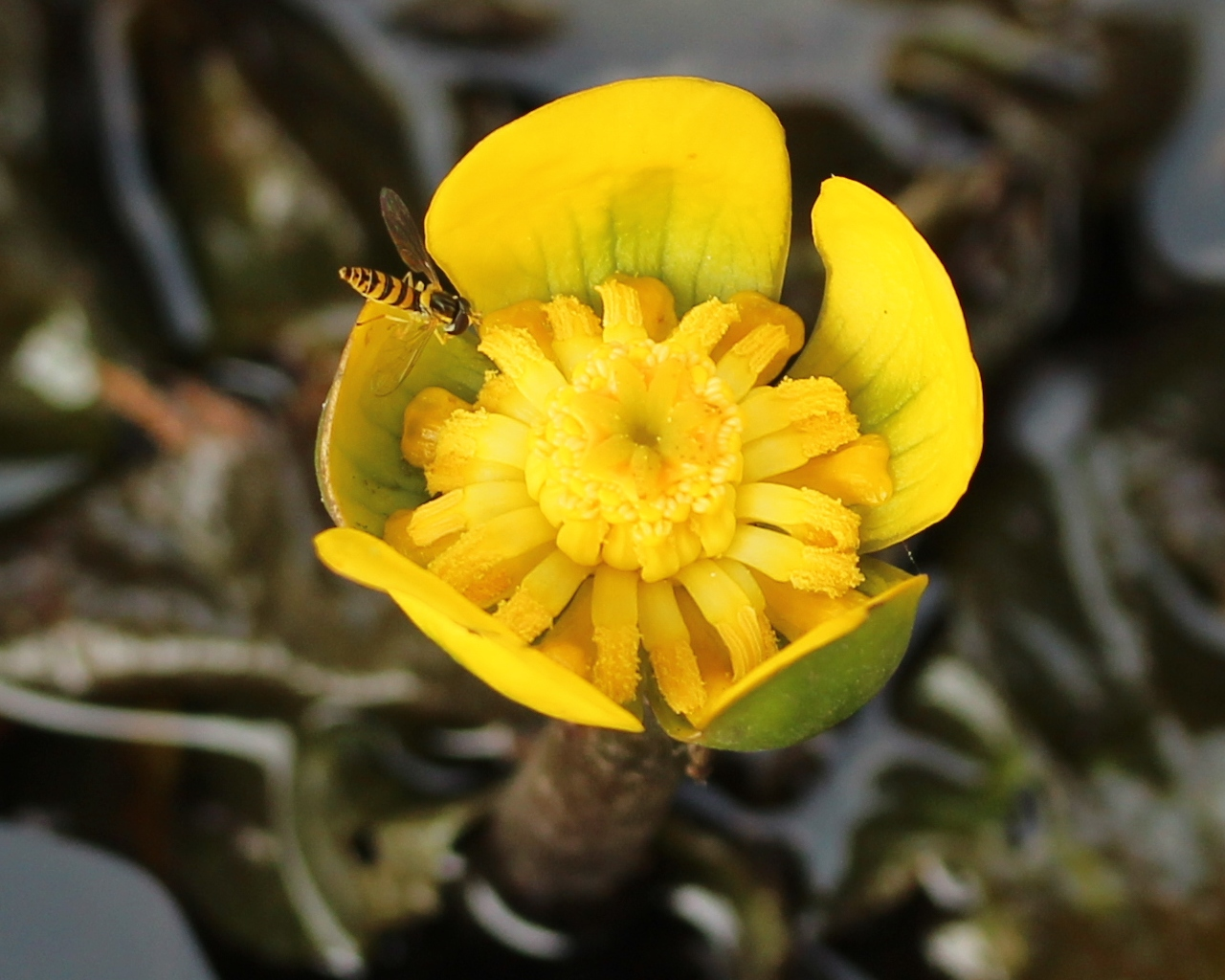

Scientific classification
- Kingdom: Plantae
- Clade: Tracheophytes
- Clade: Angiosperms
- Order: Nymphaeales
- Family: Nymphaeaceae
- Genus: Nuphar
- Section: Nuphar sect. Nuphar
- Species: N. subintegerrima

Binomial name
- Nuphar subintegerrima (Casp.) Makino
- Nuphar subintegerrima is endemic to Japan

Synonyms
- Nuphar japonica var. subintegerrima Casp.; Nymphozanthus subintegerrimus (Casp.) Fernald

= Nuphar subintegerrima =

Species of perennial aquatic plant

Nuphar subintegerrima is a species of rhizomatous aquatic plant endemic to Japan.

== Description ==
=== Vegetative characteristics ===
Nuphar subintegerrima has emerging or floating leaves. The leaves are 5-11 cm long, and 4-8.5 cm wide.

=== Generative characteristics ===
The pedunculate, solitary, yellow flower extends above the water surface. Ripe fruit detach from the plants.

== Reproduction ==
=== Vegetative reproduction ===
It reproduces vegetatively through its rhizomes.

=== Generative reproduction ===
It reproduces sexually. Flowering occurs from May to November.

== Taxonomy ==
=== Publication ===
It was first described by Robert Caspary as the variety Nuphar japonica var. subintegerrima Casp. in 1866. It was elevated to the species Nuphar subintegerrima (Casp.) Makino by Tomitaro Makino in 1910.

== Ecology ==
=== Habitat ===
It occurs in streams, bogs and irrigation ponds.

=== Pollination ===
It is pollinated by the fly species Notiphila maritima.

=== Herbivory ===
The larvae of the moth species Neoschoenobia testacealis feed on leaves and flower stalks of Nuphar subintegerrima.
