= Vernes =

Vernes may refer to:

== People ==
- Henri Vernes (1918–2021), Belgian writer
- Jacob Vernes (1728–1791), Swiss theologian and Protestant pastor
- Richárd Vernes (born 1992), Hungarian footballer

== Places ==
- Vernes, Trøndelag, a village in Agdenes municipality in Trøndelag county, Norway

== See also ==
- Verne (disambiguation)
