= Fernald =

Fernald is a French surname typical of 18th and 19th century wealthy French upperclass and aristocratic families of nobility from France and Monaco, also found in the United States, notably in the New England states.

The first known Fernald in the United States was Dr. Renald Fernald, a ship's doctor who landed on the shores of Portsmouth, New Hampshire, in 1631. His descendants include Lt. Colonel Tobias Fernald who fought in the War of Independence on George Washington's staff, Robert Frost, famed poet and Stephen King, famed author.

Fernald is a topographic name adapted from Olde French "four'nelle," the first French word for "furnace." Wealthy French immigrants in the United States Germanized the surname into a number of spellings to better fit in with the vast number of British descendants during the late 1880s. With the abolishment of entitlements, estates, and tax-exemption of the noble families in France, following the fall of the First French Empire after the year 1805, many descendants of the nobles, aristocrats, and wealthy left the country. The largest number of immigrants with the Fernald surname immigrated to North America from cities and wealthy towns in Northern-France, Southern-France and present-day Monaco to the United States and Eastern-Canada between the years 1790 and 1890, most of whom settled in Connecticut, Maine, Massachusetts, Montreal, New Hampshire, Rhode Island, New York, and Quebec.

Present-day, the Fernald surname is still almost exclusively associated with wealthy upperclass Caucasian European and American academics, lawyers, physicians, businesspeople, and politicians.

Alternative variations of the surname include, Fernault, Fernaux, Forneret, Fornerat, Varnault, Varnaux, Varnot, Vernet, Vernett, Vernette, and Vernes.

People with the surname include:

- Anne Fernald (fl. 1980s–2020s), American professor of psychology at Stanford University
- Bert M. Fernald (1858–1926), Governor and Senator from Maine
- Charles H. Fernald (1838–1921), American economic entomologist, father of Henry T. Fernald
- Chester Bailey Fernald (1869–1938), American author and playwright
- Grace Fernald (1879–1950), American educational psychologist and literacy advocate
- Harold Allen Fernald (born 1932), American publishing executive and philanthropist
- James C. Fernald (1838–1918), American clergyman, author, and authority on the English language
- Maria Elizabeth Fernald (1839–1919), American entomologist, wife of Charles
- Mark Fernald (born 1959), American politician from New Hampshire
- Merritt Lyndon Fernald (1873–1950), American botanist
- Theodore B. Fernald (born 1960), linguistics professor at Swarthmore College

== See also ==
- Fernald Ecological Reserve, a nature reserve in Quebec, Canada.
- Fernald Feed Materials Production Center, a Department of Energy facility near Fernald, Ohio where uranium was processed for use in nuclear weapons production reactors
- Fernald Hall, a lecture hall, laboratory and entomological museum for the University of Massachusetts in Amherst, Massachusetts
- Fernald Point, a small peninsula located in Southwest Harbor, Maine
- Elliot–Fernald Act, otherwise known as the Public Buildings Act, a governmental statute that provided legal ground for the construction and costs of federal buildings in the United States. Named for its primary Senate sponsor Bert M. Fernald.
