= Loch Cròcach, Lochinver =

Loch in Scotland

Loch Cròcach
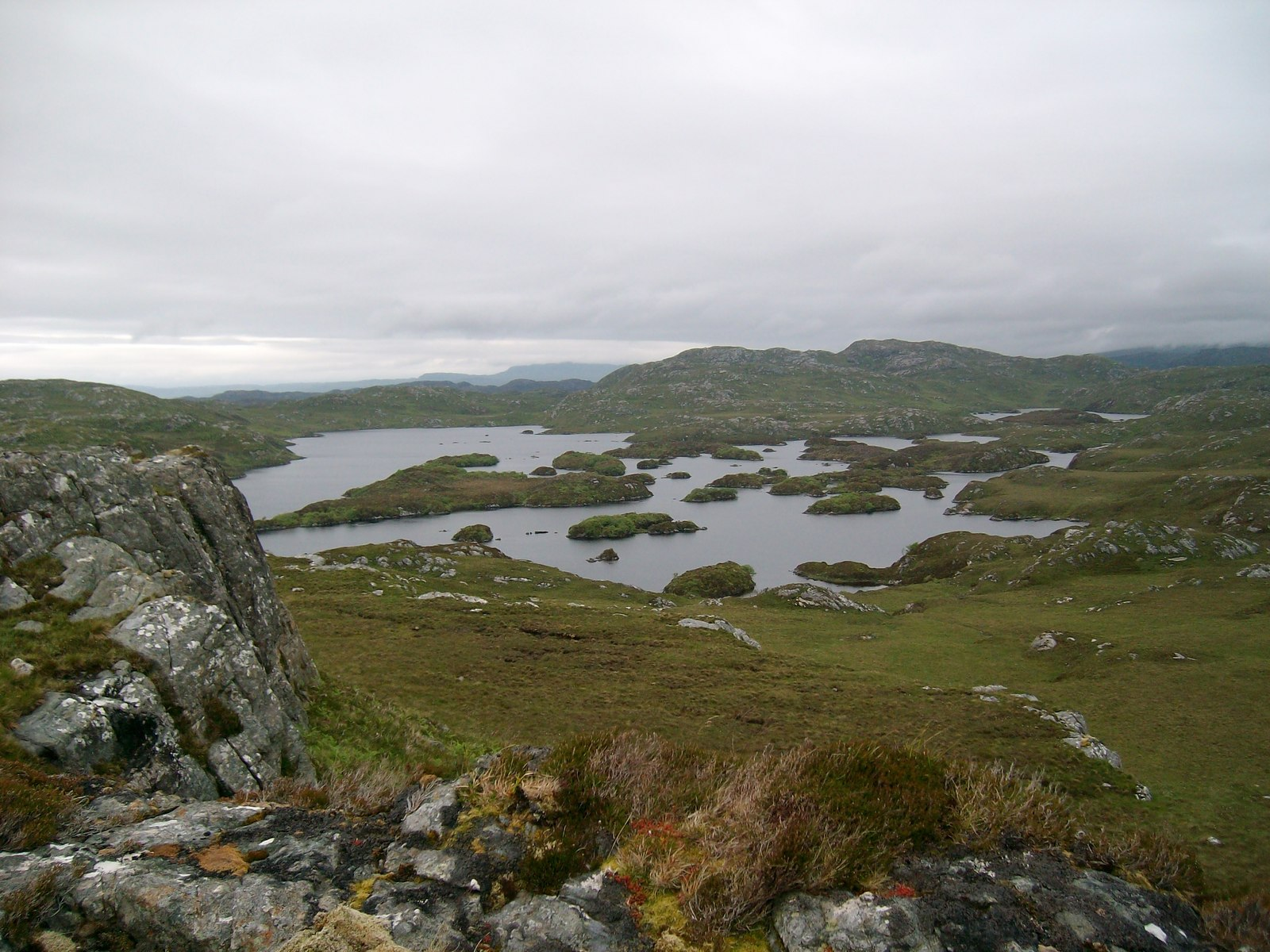
- Loch Crocach islands

- Location in Sutherland
- Location: NC10032720
- Coordinates: 58.194749°N 5.228420°W
- Type: freshwater loch
- Max. length: 2.15 km (1.34 mi)
- Max. width: 1 km (0.62 mi)
- Surface area: 60 ha (150 acres)
- Average depth: 17 ft (5.2 m)
- Max. depth: 71 ft (22 m)
- Water volume: 108,519,039 ft^{3} (3,072,917.0 m^{3})
- Shore length^{1}: 12 km (7.5 mi)
- Surface elevation: 107 m (351 ft)
- Max. temperature: 53.7 °F (12.1 °C)
- Min. temperature: 50.8 °F (10.4 °C)
- Islands: 18 islands and many rocky islets
- ^{1} Shore length is not a well-defined measure.

Loch Cròcach is a large irregular shaped, shallow loch, located about three miles north of Lochinver in the Assynt district of Sutherland, Highland, Scotland. It is one of five lochs in Scotland with the same name. Loch Cròcach is located in an area known as the Assynt-Coigach National Scenic Area, one of 40 such areas in Scotland.

== Hut circles ==
To the south and west of Loch Cròcach are the remains of several prehistoric Hut circles.
