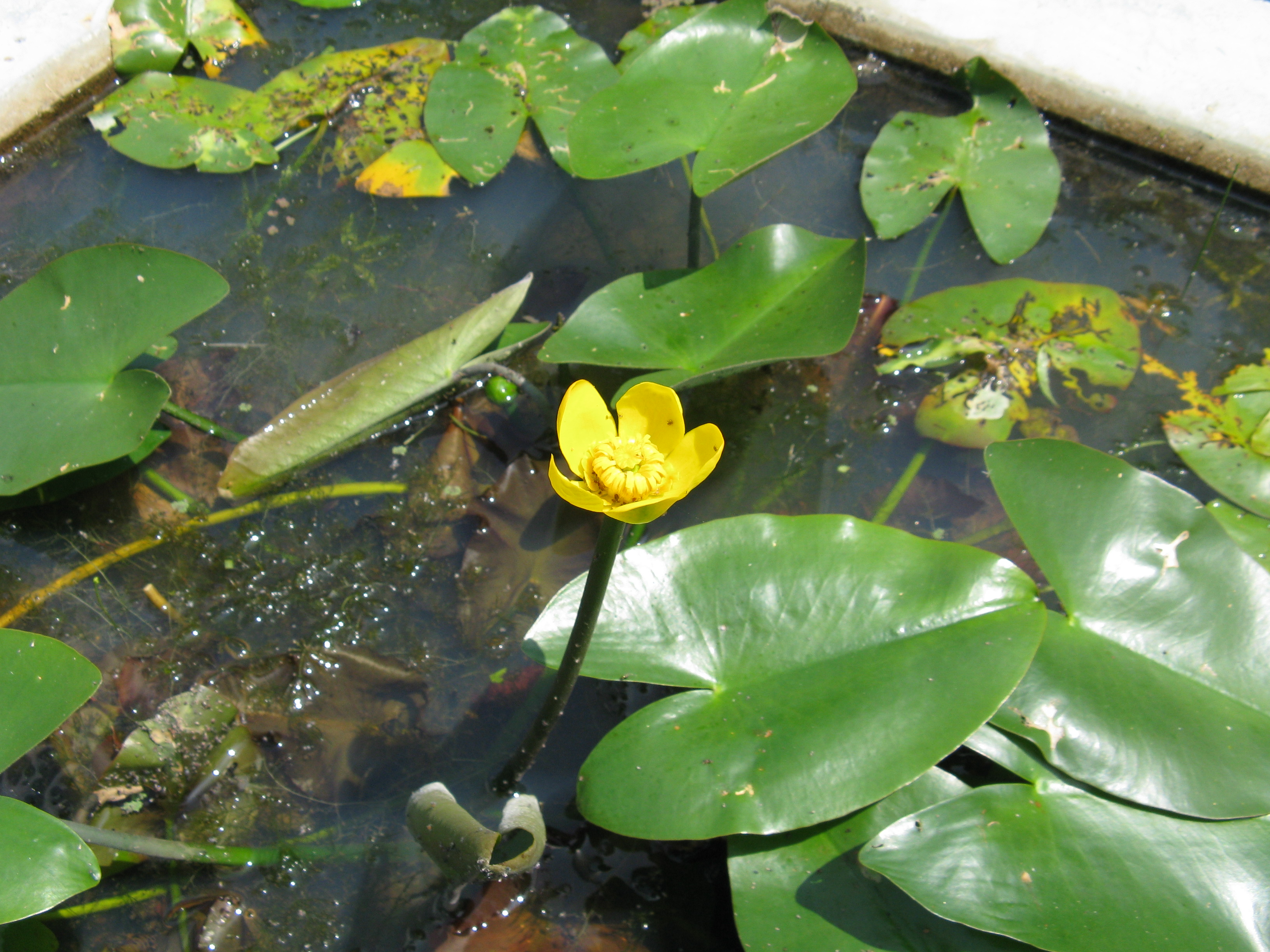
- Nuphar japonica Botanical Gardens Faculty of Science Osaka City University, Osaka, Japan

Scientific classification
- Kingdom: Plantae
- Clade: Tracheophytes
- Clade: Angiosperms
- Order: Nymphaeales
- Family: Nymphaeaceae
- Genus: Nuphar
- Section: Nuphar sect. Nuphar
- Species: N. japonica

Binomial name
- Nuphar japonica DC., 1821

Synonyms
- List: Nymphaea japonica (DC.) G.Lawson; Nymphozanthus japonicus (DC.) Fernald; Nuphar japonica var. crenata Casp.; Nuphar japonica subvar. lutea Casp.; Nuphar japonica f. rubrotincta (Casp.) Kitam.; Nuphar japonica var. rubrotincta (Casp.) Ohwi; Nuphar japonica subvar. rubrotincta Casp.; Nuphar japonica var. stenophylla Miki; Nuphar subintegerrima f. rubrotincta (Casp.) Makino

= Nuphar japonica =

Species of flowering plant

Nuphar japonica, known as East Asian yellow water-lily, is a perennial, aquatic, rhizomatous, herb in the family Nymphaeaceae native to Japan, Korea, and Russia.

Nuphar japonica is one of three species in the genus Nuphar that is dispersed in the same geographical location of the Saijo Basin, an area in the Hiroshima Prefecture of Japan.

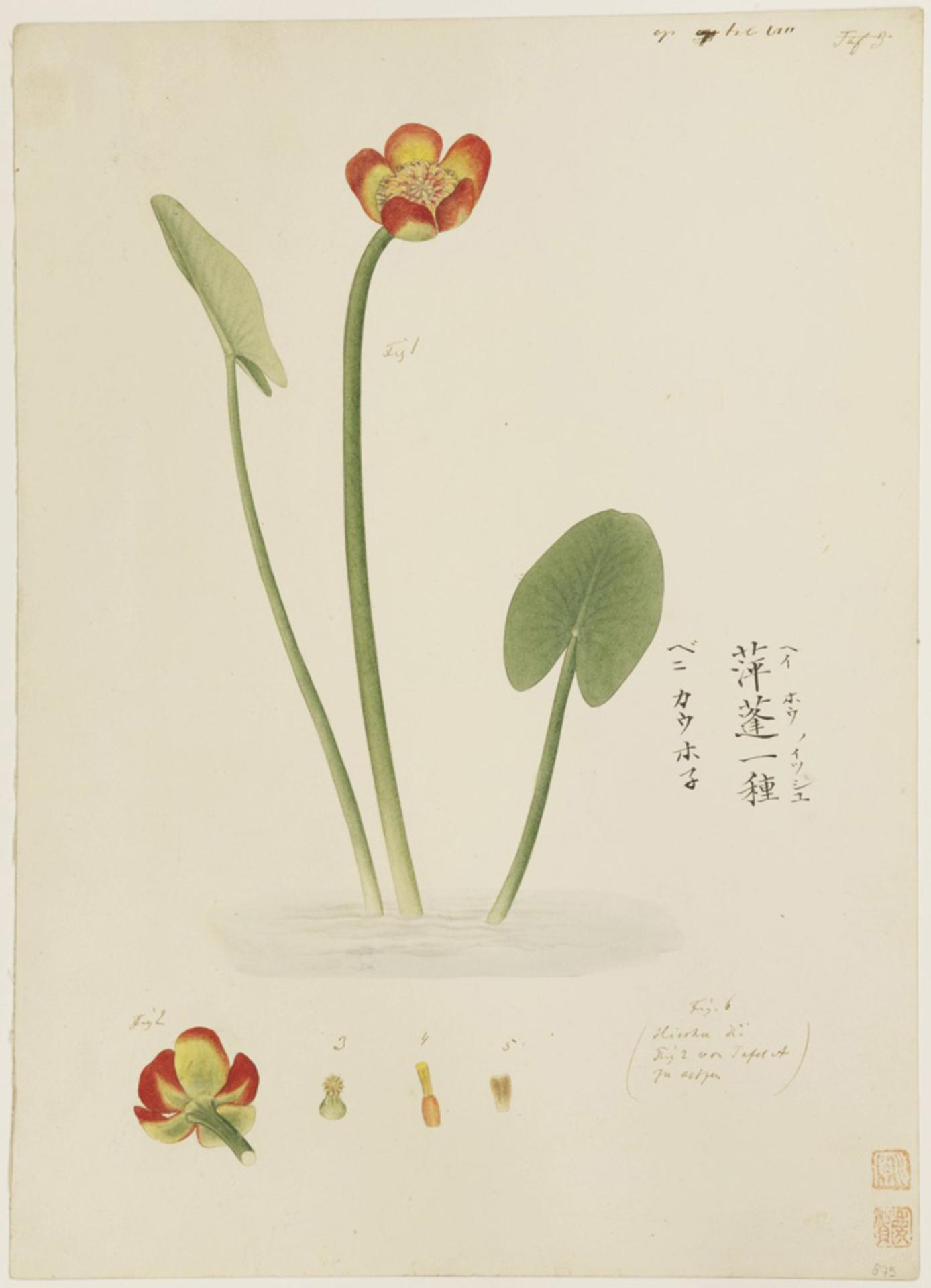
Illustration of Nuphar japonica

== Description ==
=== Vegetative characteristics ===
Nuphar japonica is a perennial, aquatic, rhizomatous, herb with 1–3 cm thick rhizomes. The leaves are submerged, floating, or emerged. The leaf blade is 12–35 cm long, and 6–18 cm wide. The terete petiole is 3–10(–14) mm wide.

=== Generative characteristics ===
The yellow to red, solitary, 4–5 cm wide flowers have a long, cylindrical peduncle. The flowers have five sepals and 10–18 petals. The gynoecium consists of 15–16 carpels. The 2–3.5 cm long, and 1.6–2.3 cm wide, urceolate, green, long-necked fruit bears ovoid seeds.

== Cytology ==
The chromosome count is 2n = 34.

== Taxonomy ==
It was published by Augustin Pyramus de Candolle in 1821. It is placed in the section Nuphar sect. Nuphar.

=== Natural hybrids ===
Nuphar × saijoensis (Shimoda) Padgett is a natural hybrid between Nuphar japonica and Nuphar pumila.

=== Etymology ===
The specific epithet japonica means of Japan.

== Phytochemistry ==
N. japonica contains the alkaloids nupharidin, 1-desoxynupharidin, nupharamine, methyl and ethyl esters of nupharamine. The fruits also contains the alkaloids (0.06%) nupharine, beta-nupharidin, desoxynupharidin. In the rhizomes are found the steroid sitosterol, alkaloids acids, higher fatty acids (palmitic, oleic acid) and the ellagitanins nupharin A, B, C, D, E and F.

== Ecology ==
=== Habitat ===
It occurs in lakes, ponds, and streams.

== Use ==
It is grown as an ornamental plant in aquaria, as well as in ponds.

== See also ==
- List of freshwater aquarium plant species
- List of the vascular plants in the Red Data Book of Russia
