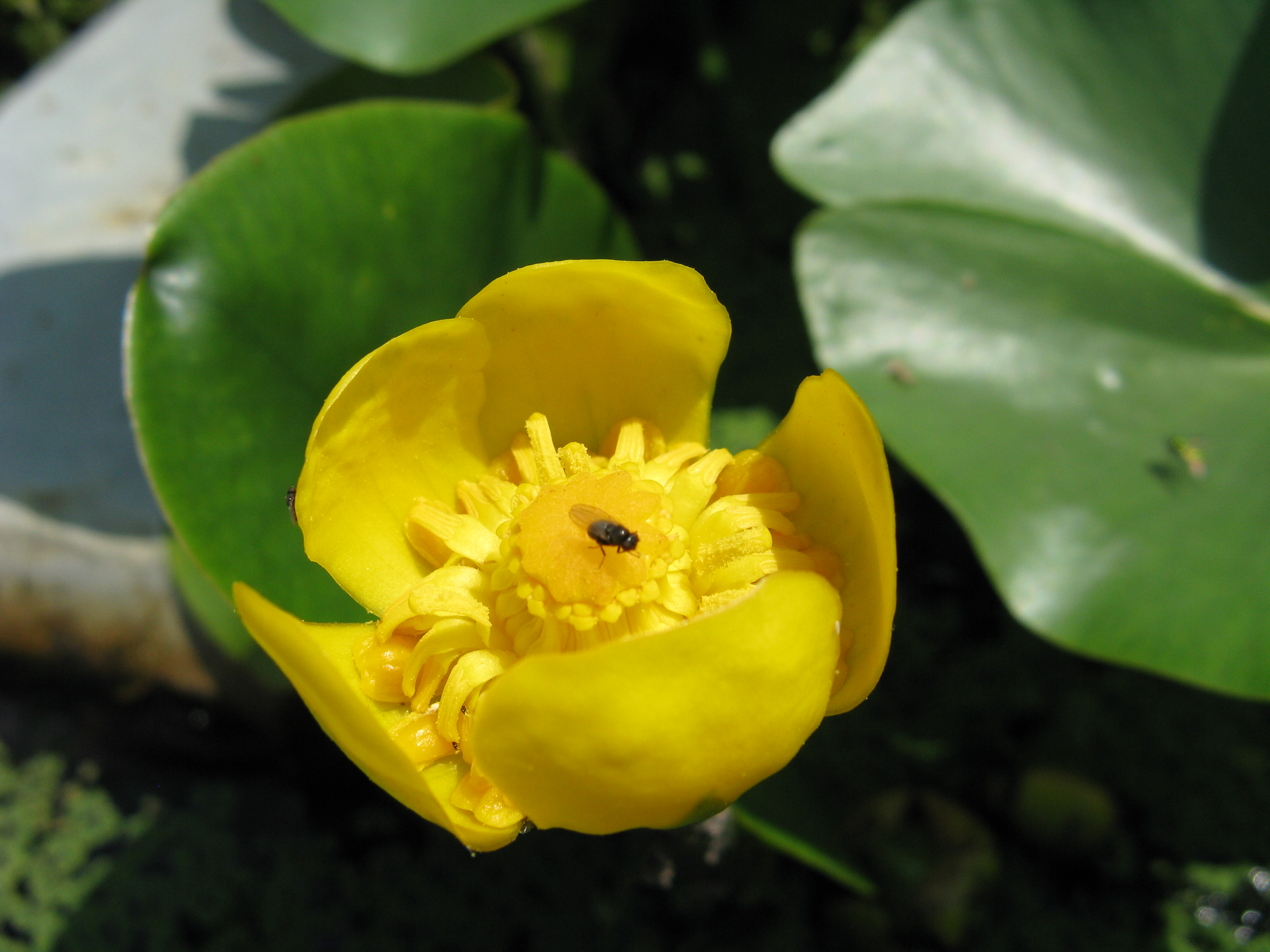

Conservation status
- Least Concern (IUCN 3.1)

Scientific classification
- Kingdom: Plantae
- Clade: Tracheophytes
- Clade: Angiosperms
- Order: Nymphaeales
- Family: Nymphaeaceae
- Genus: Nuphar
- Section: Nuphar sect. Nuphar
- Species: N. pumila

Binomial name
- Nuphar pumila (Timm) DC.

Subspecies
- Nuphar pumila subsp. pumila; Nuphar pumila subsp. sinensis (Hand.-Mazz.) Padgett

Synonyms
- Synonyms of Nuphar pumila subsp. pumila: Nenuphar pumila (Timm) Bluff & Fingerh.; Nuphar lutea subsp. pumila (Timm) Bonnier & Layens; Nuphar lutea var. pumila (Timm) A.Gray; Nymphaea lutea var. pumila Timm; Nymphaea pumila (Timm) Hoffm.; Nymphozanthus pumilus (Timm) Fernald; Synonyms of Nuphar pumila subsp. sinensis: Nuphar sinensis Hand.-Mazz.

= Nuphar pumila =

Species of flowering plant

Nuphar pumila, the least water-lily, is a perennial, rhizomatous, aquatic herb in the family Nymphaeaceae native to subarctic and temperate Eurasia.

== Description ==
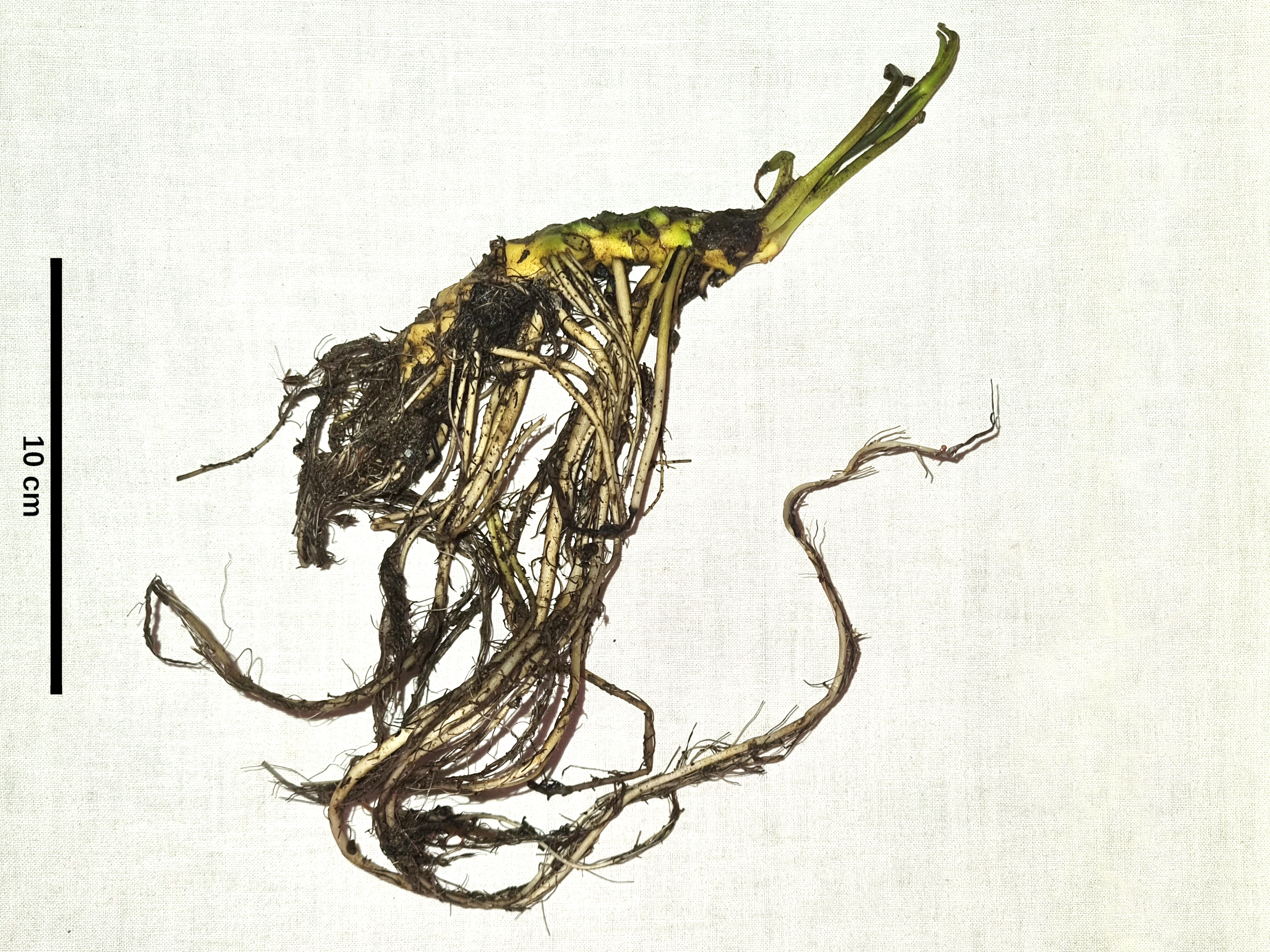
Rhizome of Nuphar pumila with scale bar (10 cm)

=== Vegetative characteristics ===
Nuphar pumila is a perennial, rhizomatous, aquatic herb with 20–70 cm long, and 1–3 cm wide rhizomes. The ovate leaves are 5–10(–13) cm long, and 6–12 cm wide. The pubescent petiole is 20–50 cm long. The submerged leaves are round and wrinkled.

=== Generative characteristics ===
The yellow, actinomorphic, faintly fragrant, 1–4.5(–6) cm wide flowers have pubescent, 40–50 cm long peduncles The five ovate to spathulate sepals are 16–29 mm long, and 9–16 mm wide. The abaxial surface of the sepals is often green. The flower has 9–13 petals. The androecium consists of 35–65 stamens. The gynoecium consists of 7–12 carpels. The star-shaped stigmatic disk with 7–12 stigmatic rays is 6–8.5 mm wide. The green, 1–2 cm wide fruit bears greenish brown, ovoid to oblong, 3–5 mm long seeds.

== Cytology ==
The chromosome count is 2n = 34. The chloroplast genome is 160737 bp long.

== Taxonomy ==
It was first published as the variety Nymphaea lutea var. pumila Timm by Joachim Christian Timm in 1795. Later, it was elevated to the status of the separate species Nuphar pumila (Timm) DC. published by Augustin Pyramus de Candolle in 1821. It is placed in the section Nuphar sect. Nuphar.

=== Etymology ===
The specific epithet pumila means small.

== Distribution ==
Nuphar pumila is native to China, Japan, Korea, Mongolia, Russia, Switzerland, the United Kingdom, Austria, Germany, France, Spain, Finland, Sweden, Denmark, and Poland.

In Europe, the typical subspecies Nuphar pumila subsp. pumila is present.

== Conservation ==
The IUCN conservation status is least concern (LC). However, it is threatened by hybridisation with Nuphar lutea, climate change, pollution, and habitat destruction. It is classified as endangered in Switzerland, vulnerable in France, and endangered in Poland.

== Ecology ==
=== Habitat ===
It occurs in lakes, ponds and slowly flowing rivers in nutrient-poor waters at depths of 0.5–3 m.

=== Herbivory ===
The leaf mine species Hydromyza livens feeds on Nuphar pumila leaves.

== Common names ==
Nuphar pumila is also known as least water lily or least yellow water-lily.

== Uses ==
It is cultivated as an ornamental plant.
