= List of freshwater aquarium plant species =

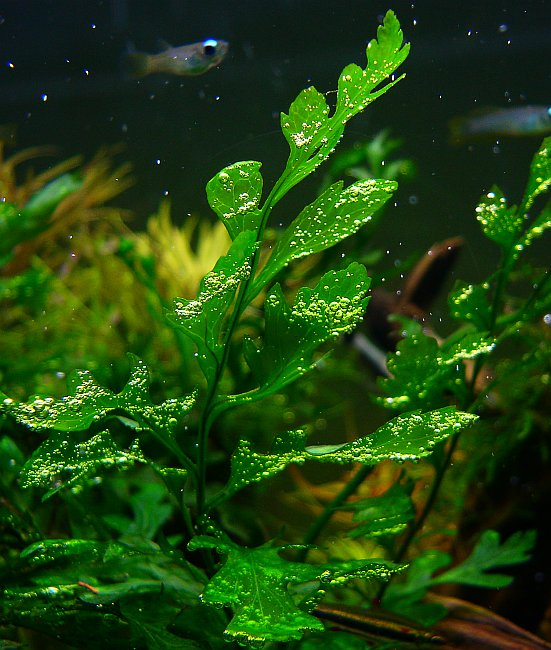
Bolbitis heudelotii, one of hundreds of aquatic plants found in the hobby

Aquatic plants are used to give the freshwater aquarium a natural appearance, oxygenate the water, absorb ammonia, and provide habitat for fish, especially fry (babies) and for invertebrates. Some aquarium fish and invertebrates also eat live plants. Hobbyists use aquatic plants for aquascaping, of several aesthetic styles.

Aquatic plants have a variety of different growth forms, with most species found either partially or fully submerged in their natural habitat. Although there are a handful of obligate aquatic plants that must be grown entirely underwater, most can grow fully emersed if the soil is moist. Though some are just living at the water margins, still, they can live in the completely submerged habitat.

Freshwater plants can be obtained from a plethora of sources. These range from established nurseries to smaller sellers found on platforms like Amazon, Etsy, and EBay. For rarer plants, they may only be obtainable through niche forums or non-traditional sellers (e.g.: scientific supply companies). Occasionally, new plants may enter the market after being collected from the wild and propagated.

This list includes all plants in a broad sense (Archaeplastida) grown and sold for intentional use in freshwater aquaria. Organisms not included are true plants that are undesirable in aquaria (e.g.: black beard algae) or other photosynthetic organisms (golden algae, diatoms, cyanobacteria) that have variable desirability but ultimately aren't plants. For those, see freshwater aquarium algae. Many of these species are dangerous invasives and should be disposed of in a way that guarantees that they will not enter local waters.

== Complex red algae (Florideophyceae) ==
=== Order Batrachospermales ===
Family	Genus	Species	Common name	Commercial sources	Image
Batrachospermaceae	Batrachospermum	?	none		

=== Order Ceramiales ===
Family	Genus	Species	Common name	Commercial sources	Image
Delesseriaceae	Caloglossa	Caloglossa beccarii	red "moss" (unaccurate)		

=== Order Thoreales ===
Family	Genus	Species	Common name	Commercial sources	Image
Thoreaceae	Thorea	Thorea hispida	none		Needs quality image

== Complex Chlorophyte green algae (Ulvophyceae) ==
=== Order Cladophorales ===
Family	Genus	Species	Common names	Commercial sources	Image
Pithophoraceae	Aegagropila	Aegagropila brownii	Marimo		

== Complex Chlorophyte green algae (Charophyceae) ==
=== Stoneworts (Order Charales) ===
Family	Genus	Species	Common names	Commercial sources	Image
Characeae	Chara	Chara braunii			
Characeae	Chara	Chara contraria			
Characeae	Chara	Chara fragilis			
Characeae	Chara	Chara vulgaris	Common stonewort		
Characeae	Nitella	Nitella capillaris			
Characeae	Nitella	Nitella flexilis	Smooth stonewort		
Characeae	Nitella	Nitella gracilis			
Characeae	Nitella	Nitella hyalina	Many-branched stonewort		
Characeae	Nitella	Nitella opaca	Dull stonewort		
Characeae	Nitella	Nitella translucens	Translucent stonewort		
Characeae	Tolypella	Tolypella glomerata			
Characeae	Tolypella	Tolypella nidifica			

== Mosses ==
=== Order Dicranales ===
Family	Genus	Species	Common name	Commercial sources	Image
Fissidentaceae	Fissidens	Fissidens fontanus	Phoenix moss		

=== Order Bryales ===
Family	Genus	Species	Common name	Commercial sources	Image
Mniaceae	Plagiomnium	Plagiomnium affine	Pearl moss	check etsy	

=== Order Hypnales ===
Family	Genus	Species	Common name	Commercial sources	Image
Amblystegiaceae	Drepanocladus	Drepanocladus aduncus	Stringy moss		Needs quality image
Amblystegiaceae	Leptodictyum	Leptodictyum riparium	Kneiff's feathermoss		
Fontinalaceae	Fontinalis	Fontinalis antipyretica	Willow moss		
Hypnaceae	Taxiphyllum	Taxiphyllum alternans	Taiwan moss		Needs quality image
Hypnaceae	Taxiphyllum	Taxiphyllum barbieri	Java moss		
Hypnaceae	Vesicularia	Vesicularia dubyana	Singapore moss		Needs quality image
Hypnaceae	Vesicularia	Vesicularia ferriei	Weeping moss		Needs quality image
Hypnaceae	Vesicularia	Vesicularia montagnei	Christmas moss		Needs quality image
Hypnaceae	Vesicularia	Vesicularia reticulata	Erect moss	check eBay	Needs quality image

== Liverworts ==
=== Order Marchantiales ===
Family	Genus	Species	Common name	Commercial sources	Image
Monosoleniaceae	Monosolenium	Monosolenium tenerum	Pellia		
Ricciaceae	Riccia	Riccia fluitans	Riccia, Crystalwort		
Ricciaceae	Ricciocarpos	Ricciocarpos natans	Purple-fringed riccia		

== Lycopods ==
=== Quillworts (Order Isoetales) ===
Family	Genus	Species	Common name	Commercial sources	Image
Isoetaceae	Isoetes	Isoetes japonica	Japanese quillwort		Needs quality image
Isoetaceae	Isoetes	Isoetes lacustris	Octopus plant, octopus quillwort		
Isoetaceae	Isoetes	Isoetes velata	?		Needs quality image

== Ferns ==
=== Waterferns (Order Salviniales) ===
Family	Genus	Species	Common name	Commercial sources	Image
Marsileaceae	Marsilea	Marsilea angustifolia	?		Needs quality image
Marsileaceae	Marsilea	Marsilea crenata	Dwarf waterclover		
Marsileaceae	Marsilea	Marsilea drummondii	Fuzzy waterclover		
Marsileaceae	Marsilea	Marsilea hirsuta	?		
Marsileaceae	Marsilea	Marsilea mutica	Variegated waterclover		
Marsileaceae	Marsilea	Marsilea quadrifolia	European waterclover		
Marsileaceae	Marsilea	Marsilea schelpeana	Cut-leaf waterclover		
Marsileaceae	Pilularia	Pilularia globulifera	Common pillwort		
Marsileaceae	Regnellidium	Regnellidium diphyllum	Two-leaved waterfern		
Salviniaceae	Azolla	Azolla caroliniana (technically Azolla cristata)	Carolina mosquitofern		
Salviniaceae	Azolla	Azolla filiculoides	?		
Salviniaceae	Azolla	Azolla pinnata	Feathered mosquitofern		
Salviniaceae	Azolla	Azolla rubra	Pacific mosquitofern		
Salviniaceae	Salvinia	Salvinia auriculata	Eared water velvet, Eared water spangles		
Salviniaceae	Salvinia	Salvinia cucullata	Cupped water velvet, Cupped water spangles		
Salviniaceae	Salvinia	Salvinia minima	Mini water velvet, water spangles		
Salviniaceae	Salvinia	Salvinia molesta complex (S. biloba, S. herzogii, S. molesta)	Giant salvinia		
Salviniaceae	Salvinia	Salvinia natans	water velvet		
Salviniaceae	Salvinia	Salvinia oblongifolia	Giant water velvet, Giant water spangles		
Salviniaceae	Salvinia	Salvinia sprucei	?	often confused with Salvinia cucullata	Needs quality image

=== Filmy ferns (Order Hymenophyllales) ===
Family	Genus	Species	Common name	Commercial sources	Image
Hymenophyllaceae	Crepidomanes	Crepidomanes malabaricum	?		Needs quality image
Hymenophyllaceae	Trichomanes	Trichomanes javanicum	Borneo Fern		

=== Common ferns (Order Polypodiales) ===
Family	Genus	Species	Common name	Commercial sources	Image
Aspleniaceae	Hymenasplenium	Hymenasplenium obscurum	?		Needs quality image
Davalliaceae	Davallia	Davallia parvula	?		Needs quality image
Dryopteridaceae	Bolbitis	Bolbitis difformis	?		Needs quality image
Dryopteridaceae	Bolbitis	Bolbitis heteroclita	El niño fern		
Dryopteridaceae	Bolbitis	Bolbitis heudelotii	African water fern		
Lomariopsidaceae	Lomariopsis	Lomariopsis lineata	Süsswassertang		
Polypodiaceae	Leptochilus	Leptochilus pteropus	Java fern		
Pteridaceae	Ceratopteris	Ceratopteris cornuta	?		Needs quality image
Pteridaceae	Ceratopteris	Ceratopteris pteridoides	Floating antler-fern		
Pteridaceae	Ceratopteris	Ceratopteris siliquosa	?		Needs quality image
Pteridaceae	Ceratopteris	Ceratopteris thalictroides	Water sprite		

== Flowering plants (Angiosperms) ==
=== Nymphaeales ===
- Trithuria austinensis
- Trithuria australis
- Trithuria inconspicua

Family	Genus	Species	Common name	Commercial sources	Image
Cabombaceae	Brasenia	Brasenia schreberi	Watershield		
Cabombaceae	Cabomba	Cabomba aquatica	Green cabomba		
Cabombaceae	Cabomba	Cabomba caroliniana	Carolina fanwort, Carolina cabomba		
Cabombaceae	Cabomba	Cabomba furcata (also known as Cabomba piauhyensis	Red cabomba		
Cabombaceae	Cabomba	Cabomba palaeformis	Purple-underleaved cabomba		
Nymphaeaceae	Barclaya	Barclaya longifolia	?		
Nymphaeaceae	Barclaya	Barclaya motleyi	?		Needs quality image
Nymphaeaceae	Nymphaea	Nymphaea stellata	?		Needs quality image
Nymphaeaceae	Nymphaea	Nymphaea leibergii	?		Needs quality image
Nymphaeaceae	Nymphaea	Nymphaea thermarum	?		
Nymphaeaceae	Nymphaea	Nymphaea zenkeri	?		Needs quality image
Nymphaeaceae	Nymphaea	Nymphaea lotus	?		Needs quality image

- Nuphar advenum
- Nuphar japonica (Spatterdock)
- Nuphar lutea (Yellow water-lily)
- Nuphar pumilum
- Nuphar sagittifolium

=== Magnoliids ===
==== Order Piperales ====
Family	Genus	Species	Common name	Commercial sources	Image
Saururaceae	Saururus	Saururus cernuus	Lizard's tail		

=== Monocots ===
==== Order Acorales ====
Family	Genus	Species	Common name	Commercial sources	Image
Acoraceae	Acorus	Acorus calamus	Common sweet flag		
Acoraceae	Acorus	Acorus gramineus	Japanese sweet flag		

==== Order Alismatales ====
Family	Genus	Species	Common name	Commercial sources	Image
Araceae		Cryptocoryne affinis; Cryptocoryne alba; Cryptocoryne albida; Cryptocoryne aponogetifolia; Cryptocoryne auriculata; Cryptocoryne axelrodii; Cryptocoryne balansae; Cryptocoryne beckettii (Beckett's Cryptocoryne); Cryptocoryne blassii; Cryptocoryne bogneri; Cryptocoryne bullosa; Cryptocoryne ciliata; Cryptocoryne cognata; Cryptocoryne cordata (Giant cryptocoryne); Cryptocoryne crispatula; Cryptocoryne cruddasiana; Cryptocoryne dewitii; Cryptocoryne diderici; Cryptocoryne elliptica; Cryptocoryne ferruginea; Cryptocoryne fusca; Cryptocoryne gasserii; Cryptocoryne grabowskii; Cryptocoryne gracilis; Cryptocoryne griffithii; Cryptocoryne hudoroi; Cryptocoryne keei; Cryptocoryne legroi; Cryptocoryne lingua; Cryptocoryne longicauda; Cryptocoryne lucens; Cryptocoryne lutea; Cryptocoryne minima; Cryptocoryne moehlmannii (Moehlmann's cryptocoryne); Cryptocoryne nevillii; Cryptocoryne nurii; Cryptocoryne pallidinervia; Cryptocoryne parva (Tiny cryptocoryne); Cryptocoryne petchii; Cryptocoryne pontederiifolia; Cryptocoryne purpurea; Cryptocoryne retrospiralis; Cryptocoryne schulzei; Cryptocoryne scrurillis; Cryptocoryne siamensis; Cryptocoryne spiralis; Cryptocoryne striolata; Cryptocoryne thwaitesii; Cryptocoryne tonkinensis; Cryptocoryne undulata (Undulate cryptocoryne); Cryptocoryne usteriana; Cryptocoryne venemae; Cryptocoryne versteegii; Cryptocoryne walkeri; Cryptocoryne wendtii 'Tropica'; Cryptocoryne x willisii; Cryptocoryne zewaldiae; Cryptocoryne zonata; Cryptocoryne zukalii			
Araceae		Anubias afzelii (Narrow-leafed anubias); Anubias barteri var. barteri (Broadleaved anubias); Anubias barteri var. angustifolia; Anubias barteri var. caladiifolia; Anubias barteri var. glabra; Anubias barteri var. nana (Dwarf anubias); Anubias gigantea; Anubias gilletti; Anubias gracilis; Anubias hastifolia; Anubias heterophylla; Anubias pynaertii			
Araceae		Lagenandra dewitii; Lagenandra insignis; Lagenandra koenigii; Lagenandra lancifolia; Lagenandra meeboldii; Lagenandra nairii; Lagenandra ovata; Lagenandra thwaitesii			
Aponogetonaceae	Aponogeton	Aponogeton appendiculatus; Aponogeton bernierianus; Aponogeton boivinianus; Aponogeton capuronii; Aponogeton crispus (Crinkled or ruffled aponogeton); Aponogeton decartyi; Aponogeton desertorum; Aponogeton dioecus; Aponogeton distachyos; Aponogeton elongatus; Aponogeton fenestralis; Aponogeton henkelianus; Aponogeton junceus; Aponogeton longiplumulosus; Aponogeton loriae; Aponogeton madagascariensis (Madagascar laceleaf, lace plant); Aponogeton natans; Aponogeton rigidifolius; Aponogeton tenuispicatus; Aponogeton ulvaceus (Compact aponogeton); Aponogeton undulatus			
Hydrocharitaceae	Stratiotes	Stratiotes aloides			
Hydrocharitaceae	Ottelia	Ottelia alismoides			
Hydrocharitaceae	Ottelia	Ottelia mesenterum			
Hydrocharitaceae	Ottelia	Ottelia ulvifolia			
Hydrocharitaceae	Elodea	Elodea canadensis			
Hydrocharitaceae	Elodea	Elodea densa			
Hydrocharitaceae	Elodea	Elodea granatensis			
Hydrocharitaceae	Elodea	Elodea najas			
Hydrocharitaceae	Elodea	Elodea nuttallii			
Hydrocharitaceae	Elodea	Elodea occidentalis			
Hydrocharitaceae	Najas	Najas graminea			
Hydrocharitaceae	Najas	Najas guadelupensis			
Hydrocharitaceae	Najas	Najas marina			
Hydrocharitaceae	Najas	Najas minor			
Hydrocharitaceae	Najas	Najas indica			
Hydrocharitaceae	Najas	Najas pectinata			
Hydrocharitaceae	Vallisneria	Vallisneria americana			
Hydrocharitaceae	Vallisneria	Vallisneria asiatica			
Hydrocharitaceae	Vallisneria	Vallisneria gigantea			Needs quality image
Hydrocharitaceae	Vallisneria	Vallisneria neotropicalis			Needs quality image
Hydrocharitaceae	Vallisneria	Vallisneria rubra	Red vallisneria		Needs quality image
Hydrocharitaceae	Vallisneria	Vallisneria spiralis			
Hydrocharitaceae	Vallisneria	Vallisneria tortifolia			Needs quality image
Hydrocharitaceae	Vallisneria	Vallisneria tortissima			Needs quality image
Hydrocharitaceae	Nechamandra	Nechamandra alternifolia			Needs quality image
Hydrocharitaceae	Hydrilla	Hydrilla verticillata			
Hydrocharitaceae	Hydrocharis	Hydrocharis laevigata	Amazon frogbit		
Hydrocharitaceae	Hydrocharis	Hydrocharis morsus-ranae			
Hydrocharitaceae	Hydrocharis	Hydrocharis spongia			
Hydrocharitaceae	Lagarosiphon	Lagarosiphon cordofanus			
Hydrocharitaceae	Lagarosiphon	Lagarosiphon madagascariensis			
Hydrocharitaceae	Lagarosiphon	Lagarosiphon verticilifolius			
Hydrocharitaceae	Lagarosiphon	Lagarosiphon major			
Hydrocharitaceae	Blyxa	Blyxa aubertii			
Hydrocharitaceae	Blyxa	Blyxa echinosperma			
Hydrocharitaceae	Blyxa	Blyxa japonica			
Hydrocharitaceae	Blyxa	Blyxa novoguineensis			
Hydrocharitaceae	Blyxa	Blyxa octandra			
Limnocharitaceae	Hydrocleys	Hydrocleys martii			
Limnocharitaceae	Hydrocleys	Hydrocleys nymphoides			
Alismataceae		Alisma canaliculatum *Alisma gramineum *Alisma lanceolatum *Alisma nanum *Alisma orientale *Alisma plantago-aquatica *Alisma subcordatum *Alisma triviale *Alisma wahlenbergii*Ranalisma rostrata*Echinodorus africanus *Echinodorus amazonicus (Amazon sword) *Echinodorus andrieuxii *Echinodorus angustifolius *Echinodorus argentinensis *Echinodorus aschersonianus *Echinodorus barthii *Echinodorus berteroi *Echinodorus bleheri (Broadleaved amazon) *Echinodorus brevipedicellatus *Echinodorus cordifolius (Radicans sword, spade leaf sword) *Echinodorus fluitans *Echinodorus grandiflorus (Large-flowered amazon) *Echinodorus horemanii (Black-red amazon) *Echinodorus horizontalis *Echinodorus humilis *Echinodorus latifolius *Echinodorus longiscapus *Echinodorus macrophyllus (Large-leaved amazon sword) *Echinodorus martii *Echinodorus major (Ruffled amazon sword) *Echinodorus opacus (Opaque amazon sword) *Echinodorus osiris (Red amazon sword) *Echinodorus 'Ozelot' *Echinodorus palaefolius *Echinodorus paniculatus *Echinodorus parviflorus (Black amazon sword) *Echinodorus pelliscidus *Echinodorus quadricostatus (Dwarf sword) *Echinodorus radicans *Echinodorus rigidifolius *Echinodorus 'Rubin' *Echinodorus rubra *Echinodorus schlueteri *Echinodorus subalatus *Echinodorus tunicatus *Echinodorus uruguayensis (Uruguay amazon sword)*Sagittaria chapmani *Sagittaria eatonii *Sagittaria filiformis *Sagittaria graminea *Sagittaria guyanensis *Sagittaria isoëtiformis *Sagittaria latifolia *Sagittaria microfila *Sagittaria montevidensis *Sagittaria natans *Sagittaria papillosa *Sagittaria platyphylla (giant sagittaria) *Sagittaria pusilla (dwarf sagittaria) *Sagittaria sagittifolia *Sagittaria subulata (needle sagittaria, floating arrowhead); Limnophyton fluitans*Helanthium bolivianum (Bolivian sword) (Synonym - Echinodorus bolivianus) *Helanthium tenellum (Pygmy chain sword) (Synonym - Echinodorus tenellus) *Helanthium zombiense *Caldesia parnassifolia*Baldellia ranunculoides*Damasonium alisma*Luronium natans			
Potamogetonaceae		Potamogeton coloratus; Potamogeton crispus; Potamogeton densus; Potamogeton filiformis; Potamogeton gayi; Potamogeton gramineus; Potamogeton lucens; Potamogeton malaianus; Potamogeton natans; Potamogeton perfoliatus			
Potamogetonaceae		Zannichellia palustris (horned pondweed)			
Potamogetonaceae		Stuckenia vaginata			
Unsorted		Lemna aequinoctialis; Lemna gibba; Lemna minor (Duckweed); Lemna perpusilla; Lemna trisulca; Wolffia arrhiza; Wolffia microscopica; Wolffiella floridana; Triglochin maritima; Triglochin palustris; Triglochin striata; Spirodela polyrhiza			
Unsorted		Jasarum steyermarkii			
Unsorted		Orontium aquaticum			
Unsorted		Ruppia maritima			
Unsorted		Schismatoglottis prietoi; Schismatoglottis roseospatha			

==== Order Asparagales ====
Family	Genus	Species	Common name	Commercial sources	Image
Orchidaceae	Spiranthes	Spiranthes odorata	Common Lady's Tresses		
Amaryllidaceae	Crinum	Crinum calamistratum			
Amaryllidaceae	Crinum	Crinum thaianum			Needs quality image

==== Order Poales ====
Family	Genus	Species	Common name	Commercial sources	Image
Cyperaceae	Eleocharis	Eleocharis belem	Japanese hairgrass		
Cyperaceae	Eleocharis	Eleocharis montevidensis			
Cyperaceae	Eleocharis	Eleocharis parvula	Dwarf hairgrass		
Cyperaceae	Eleocharis	Eleocharis pusilla			
Cyperaceae	Eleocharis	Eleocharis vivipara			
Eriocaulaceae	Eriocaulon	Eriocaulon amanoanum			
Eriocaulaceae	Eriocaulon	Eriocaulon cinereum			
Eriocaulaceae	Eriocaulon	Eriocaulon depressum			
Eriocaulaceae	Eriocaulon	Eriocaulon parkeri			
Eriocaulaceae	Eriocaulon	Eriocaulon setaceum			
Eriocaulaceae	Paepalanthus	Paepalanthus fluviatilis (formerly Tonina fluviatilis)			
Poaceae	Arthraxon	Arthraxon hispidus			
Juncaceae	Juncus	Juncus repens	Creeping rush		

=== Ceratophyllales ===
Family	Genus	Species	Common name	Commercial sources	Image
Ceratophyllaceae	Ceratophyllum	Ceratophyllum demersum	Rigid coontail		
Ceratophyllaceae	Ceratophyllum	Ceratophyllum submersum	Soft coontail, Tropical coontail		

=== Eudicots ===
Family	Genus	Species	Common name	Commercial sources	Image

- Shinnersia rivularis (Mexican oak leaf)
- Gratiola amphiantha
- Gratiola brevifolia
- Gratiola officinalis
- Gratiola virginiana
- Gratiola viscidula
- Pogostemon erectus
- Pogostemon helferi (Downoi)
- Pogostemon sampsonii
- Pogostemon stellatus (Star Rotala)
- Pogostemon yatabeanus
- Acmella repens
- Aldrovanda vesiculosa (Waterwheel Plant)
- Alternanthera bettzickiana
- Alternanthera philoxeroides (Alligator weed)
- Alternanthera reineckii (Water Hedge)
- Alternanthera sessilis
- Ammannia anagalloides
- Ammannia baccifera
- Ammannia capitellata (Syn. Nesaea triflora)
- Ammannia coccinea
- Ammannia crassicaulis (Syn. Nesaea crassicaulis)
- Ammannia gracilis (Delicate ammania, red ammania)
- Ammannia latifolia
- Ammannia multiflora
- Ammannia pedicellata ((Syn. Nesaea pedicellata)
- Ammannia praetermissa
- Ammannia senegalensis

- Bacopa amplexicaulis
- Bacopa australis
- Bacopa caroliniana (lemon bacopa, water hyssop, giant bacopa)
- Bacopa crenata
- Bacopa innominata
- Bacopa lanigera
- Bacopa madagascarensis
- Bacopa monnieri (water hyssop, dwarf bacopa, baby tears)
- Bacopa myriophylloides (Myriophyllum-like Bacopa)
- Bacopa rotundifolia (Round bacopa)
- Bacopa salzmannii (Purple Bacopa)
- Bacopa serpyllifolia

- Hygrophila angustifolia
- Hygrophila balsamica
- Hygrophila corymbosa 'crispa'
- Hygrophila corymbosa 'glabra' (Broadlead giant stricta)
- Hygrophila corymbosa 'gracilis'
- Hygrophila corymbosa 'siamensis'
- Hygrophila corymbosa 'strigosa'
- Hygrophila difformis (Water wisteria)
- Hygrophila difformis 'Triflora' (Pink-leaf Water Wisteria)
- Hygrophila guianensis
- Hygrophila lacustris
- Hygrophila lancea
- Hygrophila lancea 'Chai'
- Hygrophila natalis
- Hygrophila odora
- Hygrophila ringens
- Hygrophila polysperma (Dwarf hygrophilia)
- Hygrophila salicifolia
- Hygrophila serpyllum
- Hygrophila stricta (Thai stricta, green stricta)
- Hygroryza aristata

- Ludwigia alternifolia
- Ludwigia arcuata
- Ludwigia glandulosa (Glandular ludwigia, red star ludwigia)
- Ludwigia helminthorrhiza
- Ludwigia inclinata
- Ludwigia inclinata var. verticellata 'Cuba'
- Ludwigia x Lacustris
- Ludwigia mullertii
- Ludwigia natans
- Ludwigia ovalis (Oval-leafed Ludwigia)
- Ludwigia polycarpa
- Ludwigia sedioides (Mozaic plant)
- Ludwigia senegalensis
- Ludwigia spaerocarpa
- Ludwigia palustris
- Ludwigia pulvinaris
- Ludwigia repens (Creeping ludwigia, narrow-leaf ludwigia)

- Myriophyllum alterniflorum
- Myriophyllum aquaticum (Brazilian milfoil, milfoil)
- Myriophyllum elatinoides
- Myriophyllum heterophyllum
- Myriophyllum hippuroides (Green milfoil, water milfoil)
- Myriophyllum mattogrossense
- Myriophyllum mezianum
- Myriophyllum proserpinacoides
- Myriophyllum rubricaule (Red-stem myriophyllum)
- Myriophyllum scabratum (Foxtail)
- Myriophyllum spicatum
- Myriophyllum tuberculatum (Red myriophyllum)
- Myriophyllum ussuriense
- Myriophyllum verticillatum
- Myriophylumm oguraense

- Rotala fimbriata
- Rotala hippuris Horse-tail Rotala)
- Rotala indica (Indian rotala)
- Rotala macrandra (Giant red rotala)
- Rotala mexicana (Mexican rotala)
- Rotala myriophyloides (Watermillfoil-like leaf rotala)
- Rotala xNanjenshan
- Rotala ramosior (Sunset-purple rotala)
- Rotala repens (Creeping rotala)
- Rotala rotundifolia (Dwarf rotala)
- Rotala serpyllifolia
- Rotala sahyadrica (Sahyadri rotala)
- Rotala tulunadensis (Tulunadu rotala)
- Rotala pusilla
- Rotala wallichii (Whorly rotala)
- Rotala verticillaris

- Utricularia bifida
- Utricularia gibba
- Utricularia graminifolia (Grass-leaf bladderwort)
- Utricularia hydrocarpa
- Utricularia minor
- Utricularia stellaris
- Utricularia vulgaris
- Aciotis acuminifolia
- Armoracia aquatica
- Oenanthe javanica
- Oenanthe aquatica
- Oldenlandia salzmannii (Syn. Hedyotis salzmannii)
- Ranunculus aquatilis (Aquatic Buttercup)
- Ranunculus circinatus (Fan-leaved water-crowfoot)
- Ranunculus fluitans (Floating Water-crowfoot)
- Ranunculus inundatus (River Buttercup)
- Ranunculus limosella
- Ranunculus peltatus (Pond Water-crowfoot)
- Ranunculus trichophyllus (Thread-leaved Water-crowfoot)
- Rorippa aquatica
- Samolus valerandi (Water cabbage)
- Sclerolepis uniflora (Pink Bog-Button)
- Sium floridanum
- Sium latifolium
- Staurogyne repens
- Staurogyne stolonifera
- Subularia aquatica
- Trapa natans (Water chestnut)

== By scientific name ==
The taxonomy of most plant genera is not final. Scientific names listed here may, therefore, contradict other sources. This list is temporary and will be removed upon completion of the charts.

Common aquarium plant species:

- Berula erecta
- Boltonia diffusa
- Bucephalandra gigantea
- Bucephalandra motleyana
- Bucephalandra catherineae
- Calla palustris
- Caltha palustris
- Callitriche hamulata
- Callitriche hermaphroditica
- Callitriche palustris
- Callitriche stagnalis
- Callitriche terestris
- Cardamine lyrata (Chinese ivvy, Japanese cress)
- Cardamine rotundifolia
- Clinopodium brownei
- Crassula aquatica
- Crassula helmsii
- Cuphea anagalloidea
- Cyanotis axillaris
- Cyperus alternifolius
- Cyperus helferi
- Cyperus papyrus
- Dianthera americana (American Water-willow)
- Didiplis diandra (American water hedge)
- Diodia kuntzei
- Diodia virginiana

- Egleria fluctuans
- Pontederia azurea
- Pontederia crassipes (Water hyacinth)
- Pontederia diversifolia
- Elatine gussonei
- Elatine hydropiper
- Elatine macropoda
- Elatine triandra
- Equisetum spp.
- Glossadelphus zollingeri
- Glossostigma diandrum
- Glossostigma elatinoides
- Gymnocoronis spilanthoides (Spadeleaf plant)
- Habenaria repens (Water-spider Orchid)
- Hemianthus callitrichoides (Dwarf helzine)
- Hemianthus micranthemoides (Pearlweed)
- Heteranthera dubia
- Heteranthera reniformis
- Heteranthera zosterifolia (Stargrass)
- Hippuris vulgaris
- Hottonia inflata
- Hottonia palustris (Water violet)

- Hydrocotyle leucocephala (Brazilian pennywort)
- Hydrocotyle sibthorpioides
- Hydrocotyle tripartita
- Hydrocotyle verticillata (Whorled umbrella plant)
- Hydrocotyle vulgaris
- Hydrostachys imbricata
- Hydrothrix gardneri
- Hydrotriche hottoniiflora
- Hyptis alata
- Hyptis lorentziana

- Iris spp.
- Lilaeopsis brasiliensis
- Lilaeopsis carolinensis
- Lilaeopsis macloviana
- Lilaeopsis mauritiana
- Lilaeopsis novae-zelandiae (New Zealand grassplant)
- Lilaeopsis ruthiana

- Limnophila aquatica (Giant ambulia)
- Limnophila aromatica
- Limnophila barterii
- Limnophila brownii
- Limnophila glabra
- Limnophila heterophylla
- Limnophila hippuridoides
- Limnophila indica (Indian ambulia)
- Limnophila sessiliflora (Dwarf ambulia)
- Limnophila rugosa
- Lindernia crustacea F. Muell.
- Lindernia dubia
- Lindernia grandiflora
- Lindernia parviflora
- Lindernia rotundifolia
- Littorella uniflora
- Lobelia cardinalis (Cardinal flower, scarlet lobelia)
- Lobelia dortmanna
- Lycopodiella inundata (Lycopodium inundatum)
- Lysimachia nummularia (creeping Jenny, moneywort)

- Mayaca fluviatilis
- Mayaca madida (Synonym Mayaca sellowiana)
- Mayaca vandellii
- Mentha aquatica
- Micranthemum umbrosum (Helzine)
- Microcarpaea minima
- Microsorum pteropus (Java fern)
- Monochoria vaginalis
- Murdannia engelsii
- Murdannia keisak
- Nelumbo nucifera (India Lotus)
- Neptunia oleracea (Water mimosa)
- Nomaphila siamensis
- Nymphoides aquatica (Banana plant)
- Nymphoides humboldtiana
- Nymphoides indica
- Nymphoides peltata
- Penthorum sedoides (Ditch Stonecrop)
- Persicaria hydropiperoides
- Persicaria praetermissa
- Pistia stratiotes (Water lettuce)
- Phyllanthus fluitans
- Physostegia purpurea
- Proserpinaca palustris (Common Mermaidweed)
- Proserpinaca pectinata (Feathery Mermaidweed)
- Pontederia cordata

== False aquatics or pseudo-aquarium plants ==
Several species of terrestrial plants are frequently sold as "aquarium plants". While such plants are beautiful and can survive and even flourish for months under water, they will eventually die and must be removed so their decay does not contaminate the aquarium water. These plants have no necessary biology to live underwater.

- Aglaonema modestum (Chinese evergreen)
- Aglaonema simplex
- Chlorophytum bichetii (Pongol sword)
- Dracaena sanderiana (Striped dragonplant)
- Fittonia argyroneura
- Hemigraphis colorata (Crimson ivy)
- Ophiopogon japonicus (Fountain plant)
- Pilea cadierei (Aluminum plant)
- non-aquatic Selaginella sp
- Sciadopitys verticillata) (Umbrella pine, koyamaki)
- Spathiphyllum tasson (Brazil sword)
- Syngonium podophyllum (Stardust ivy)
- Trichomanes javanicum

== Images ==
=== Photos ===
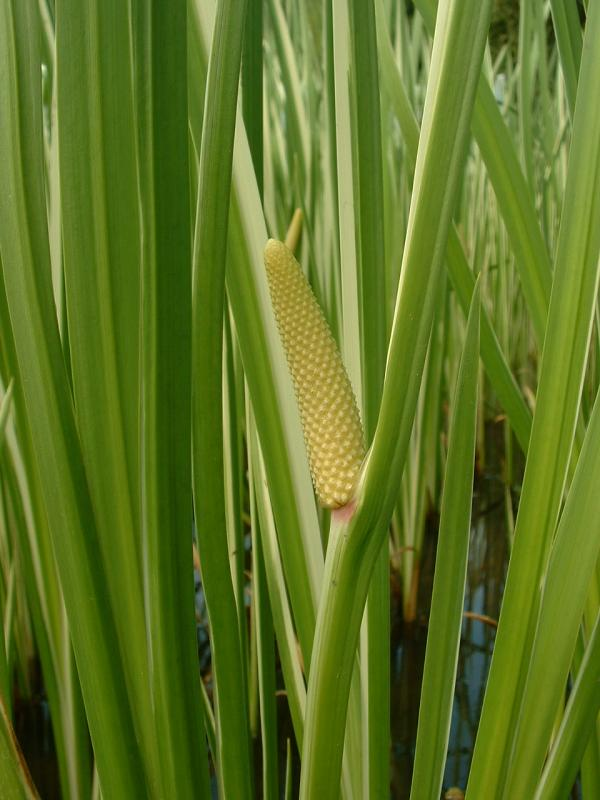
Acorus calamus

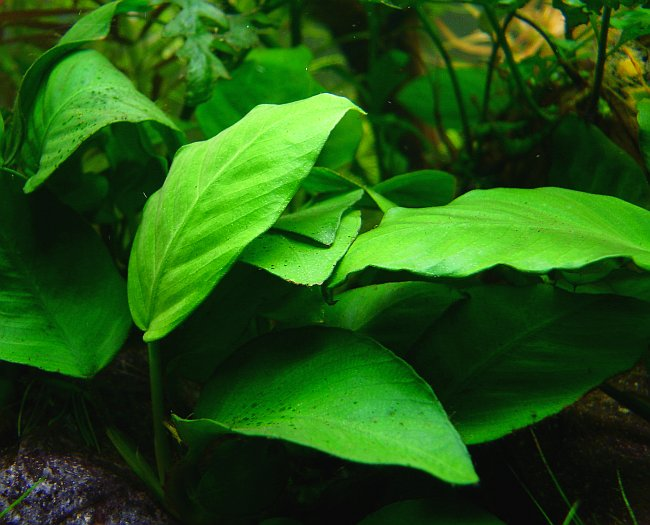
Anubias barteri var. glabra

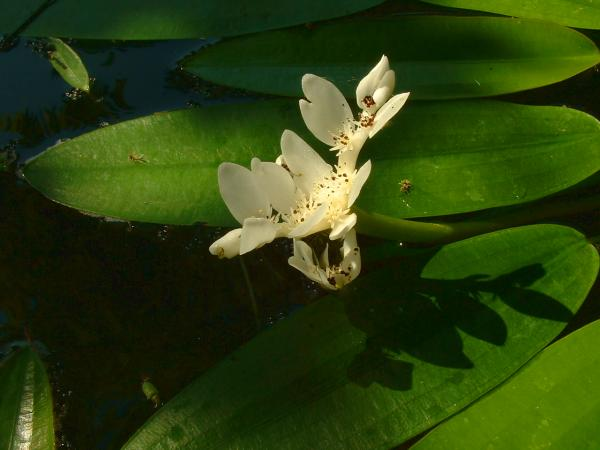
Aponogeton distachyos

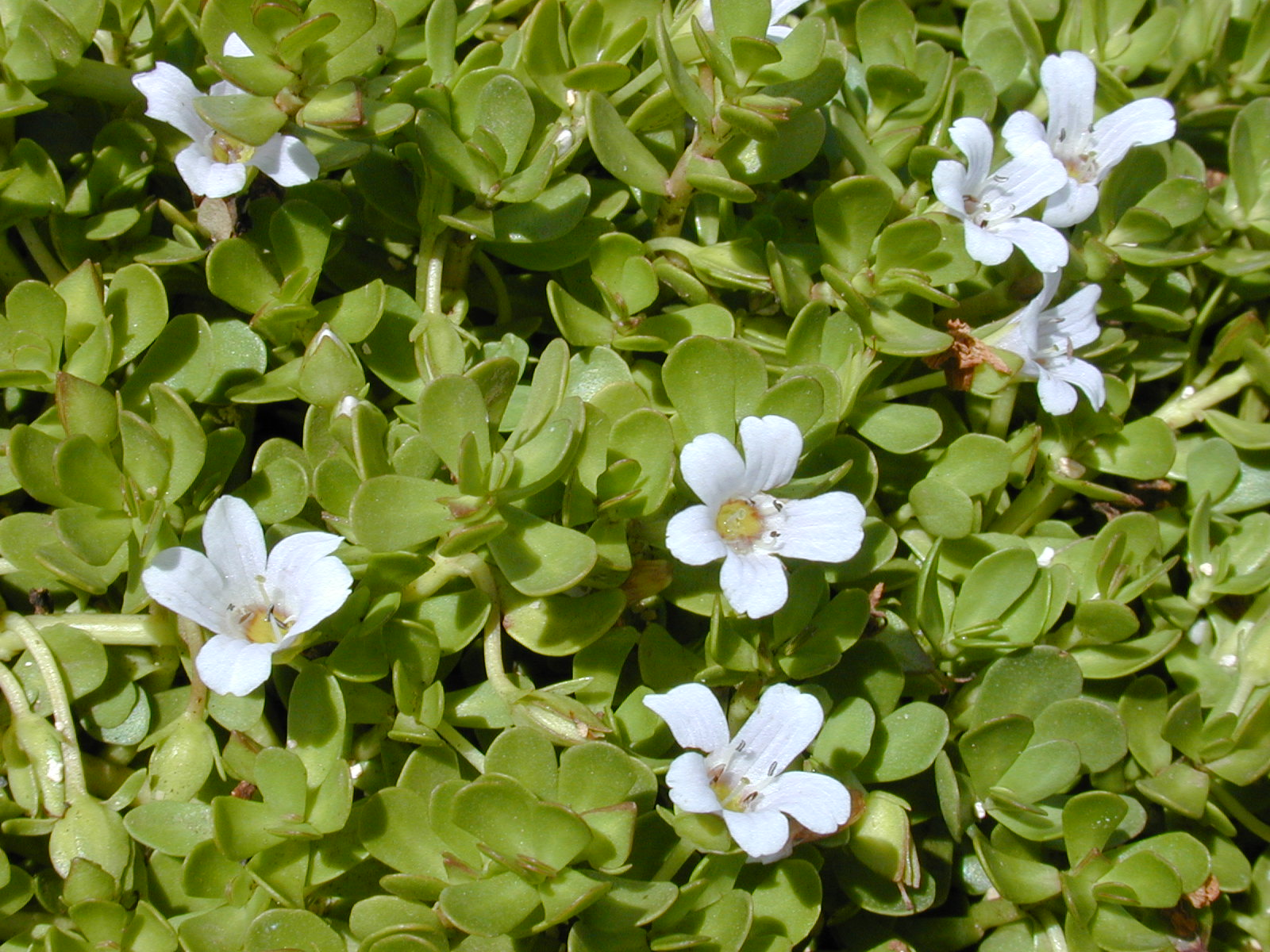
Bacopa monnieri

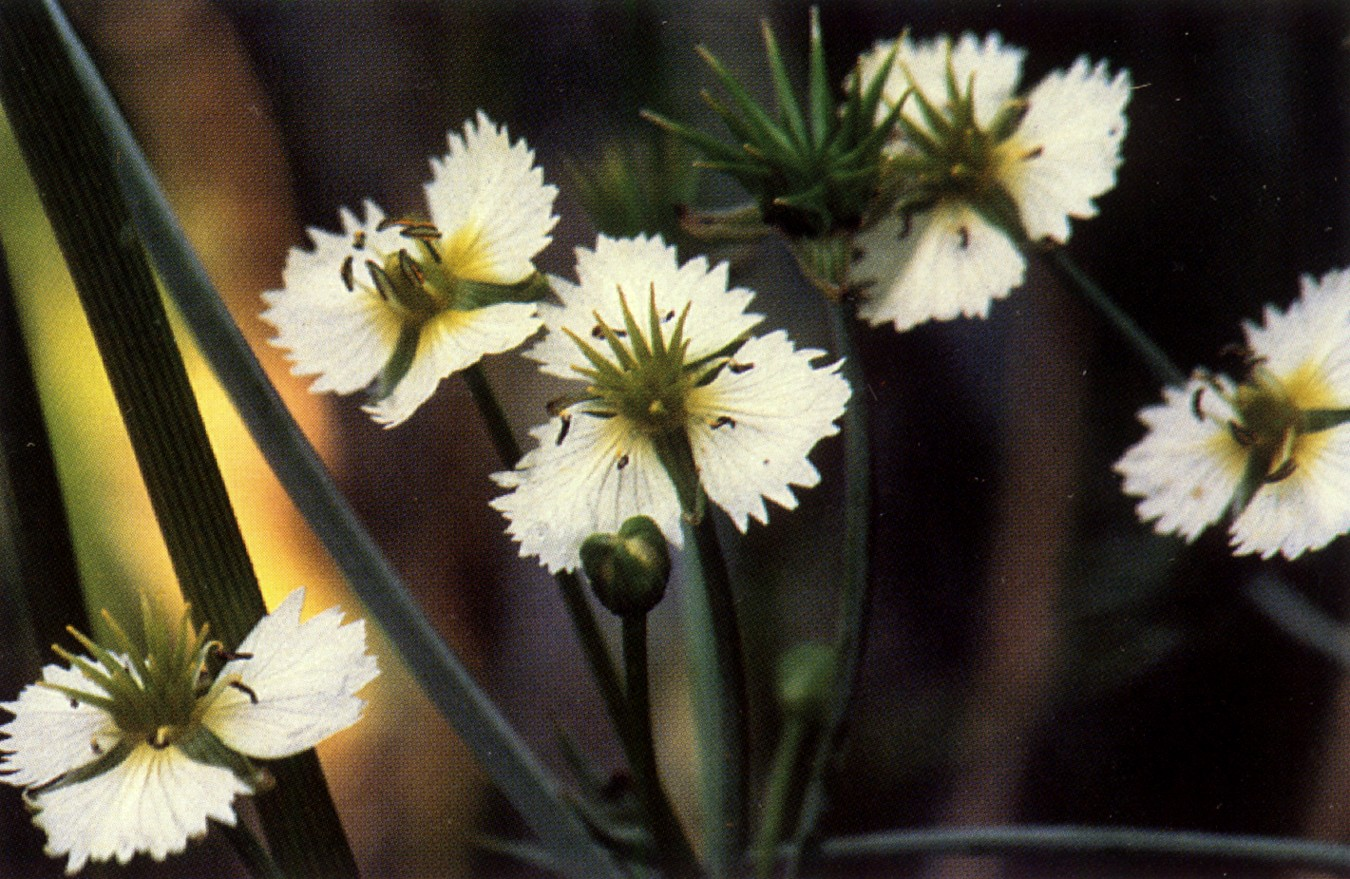
Damasonium californicum

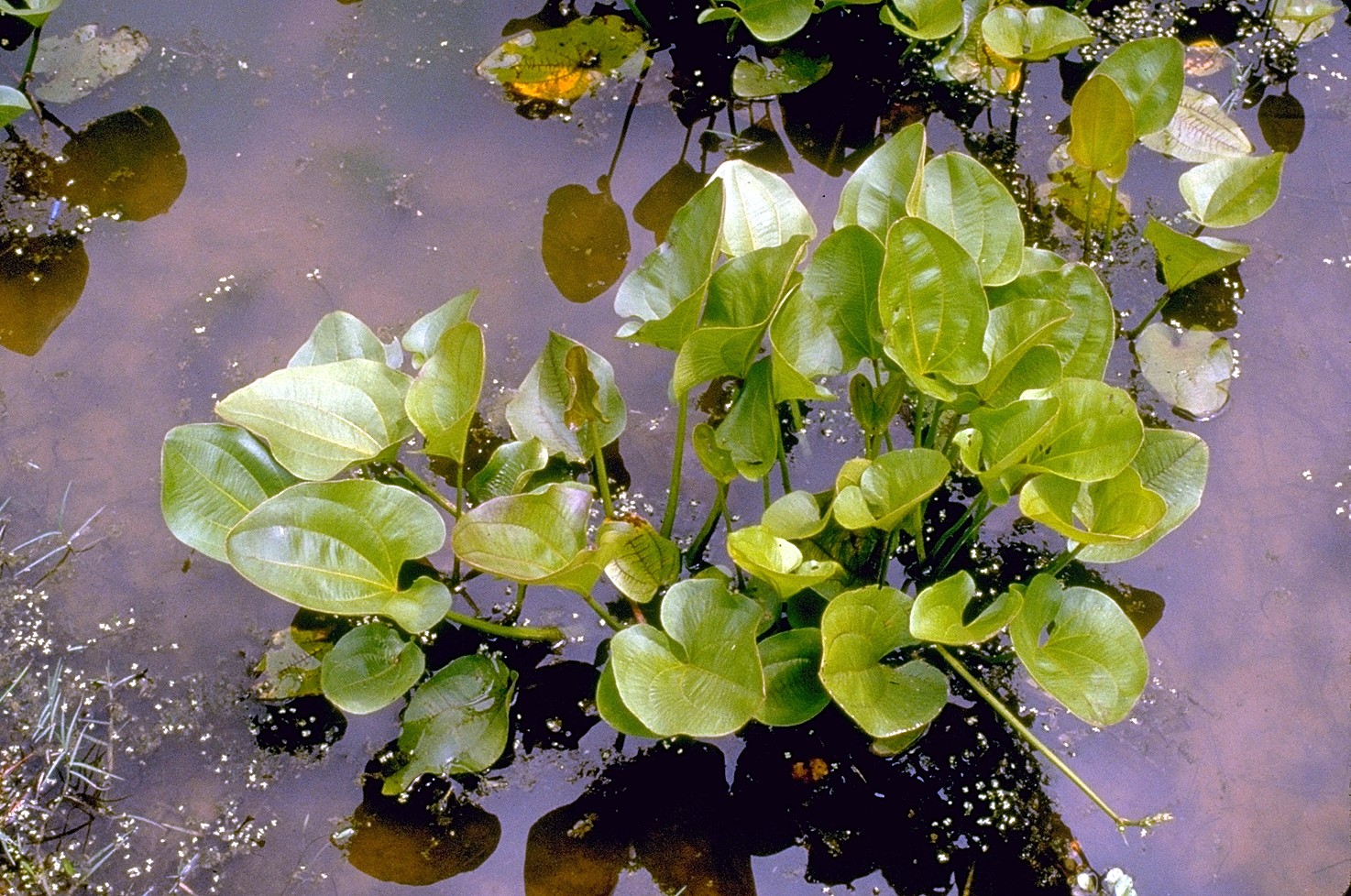
Echinodorus cordifolius

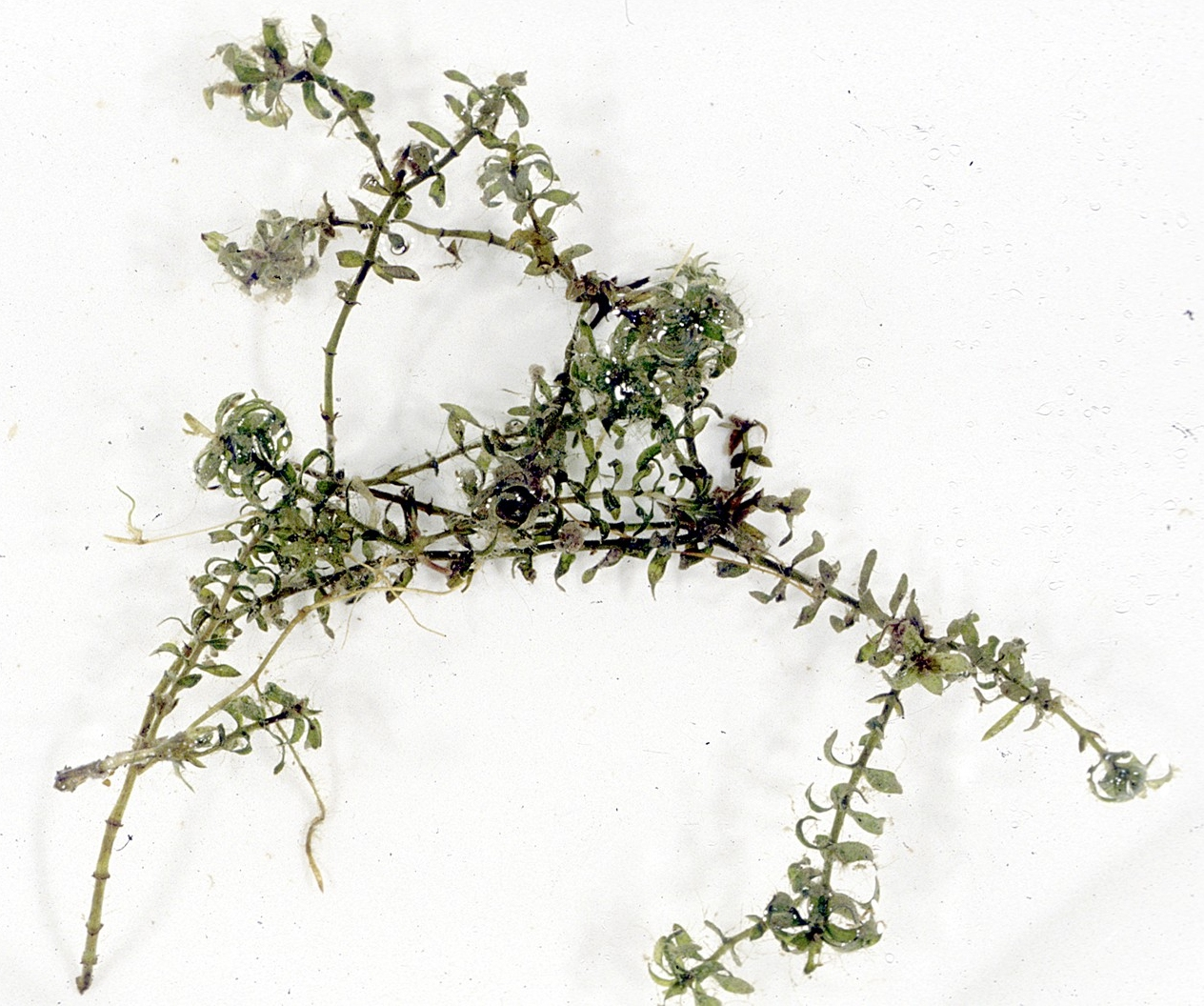
Elodea canadensis

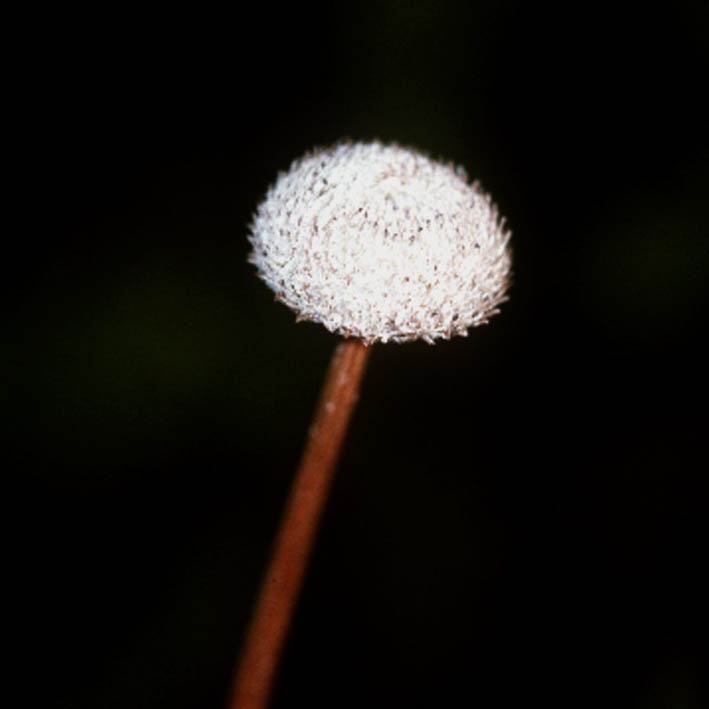
Eriocaulon decangulare

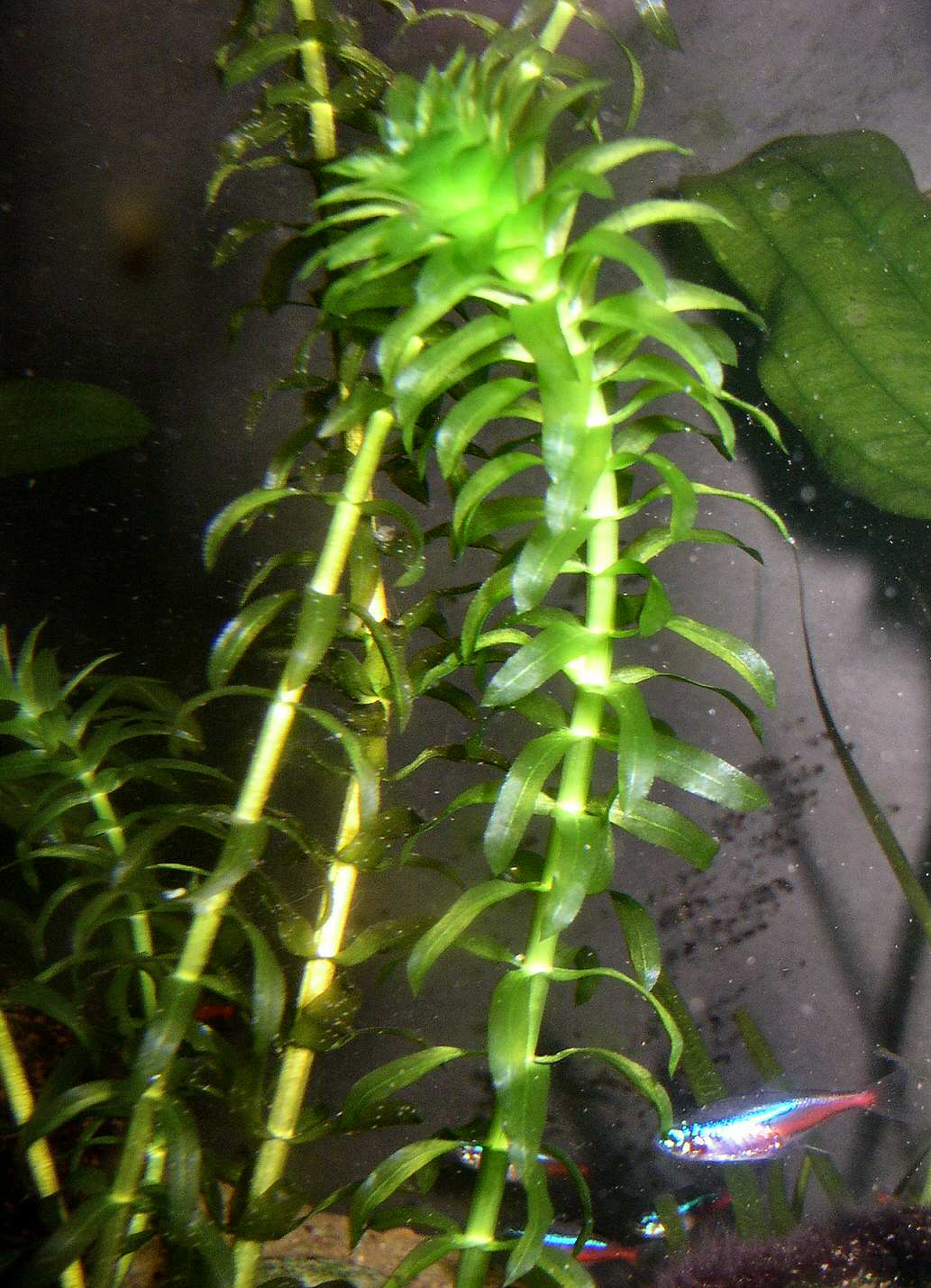
Elodea densa

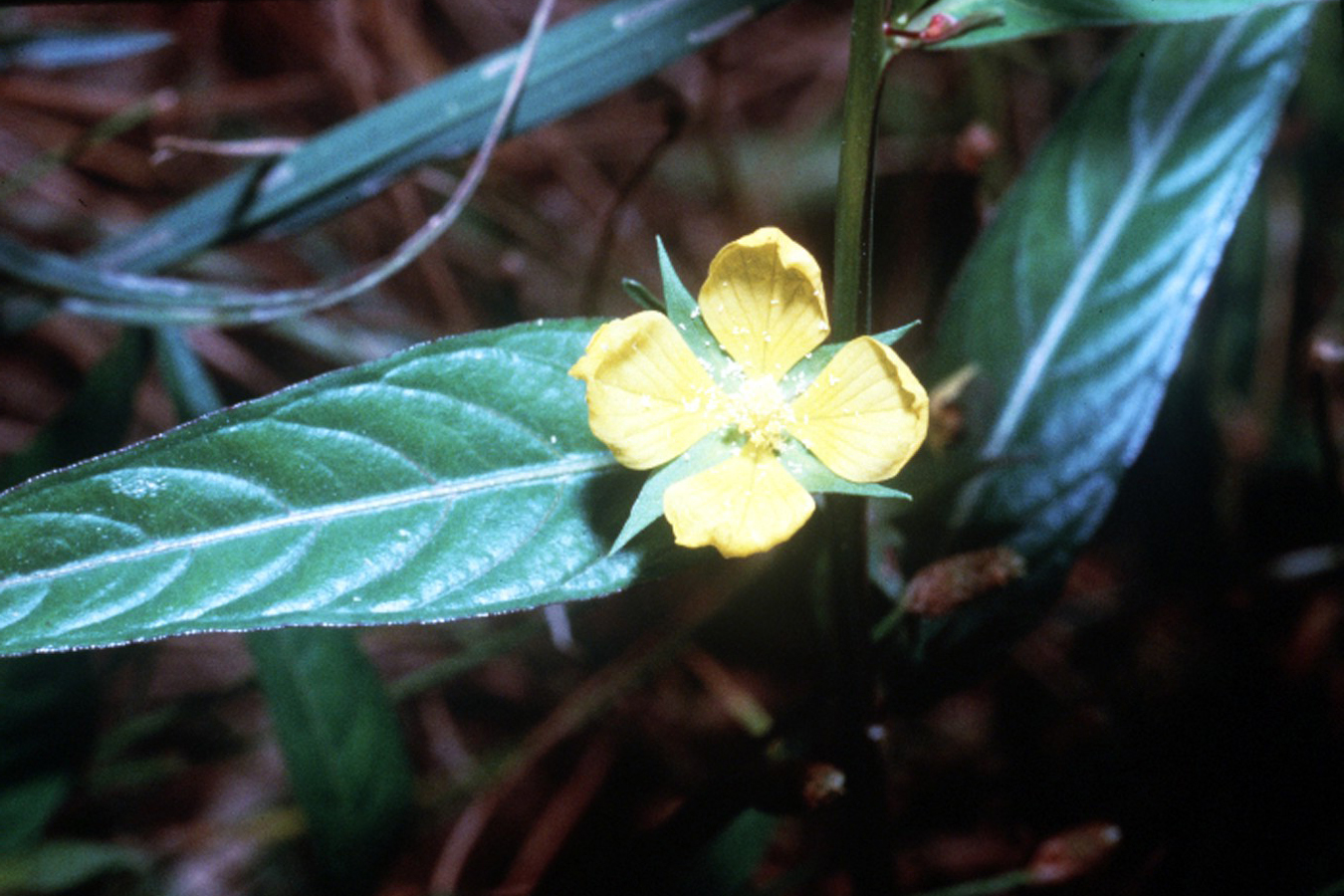

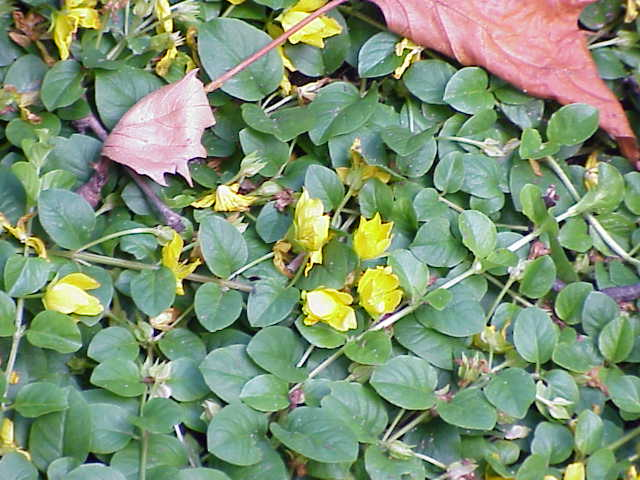

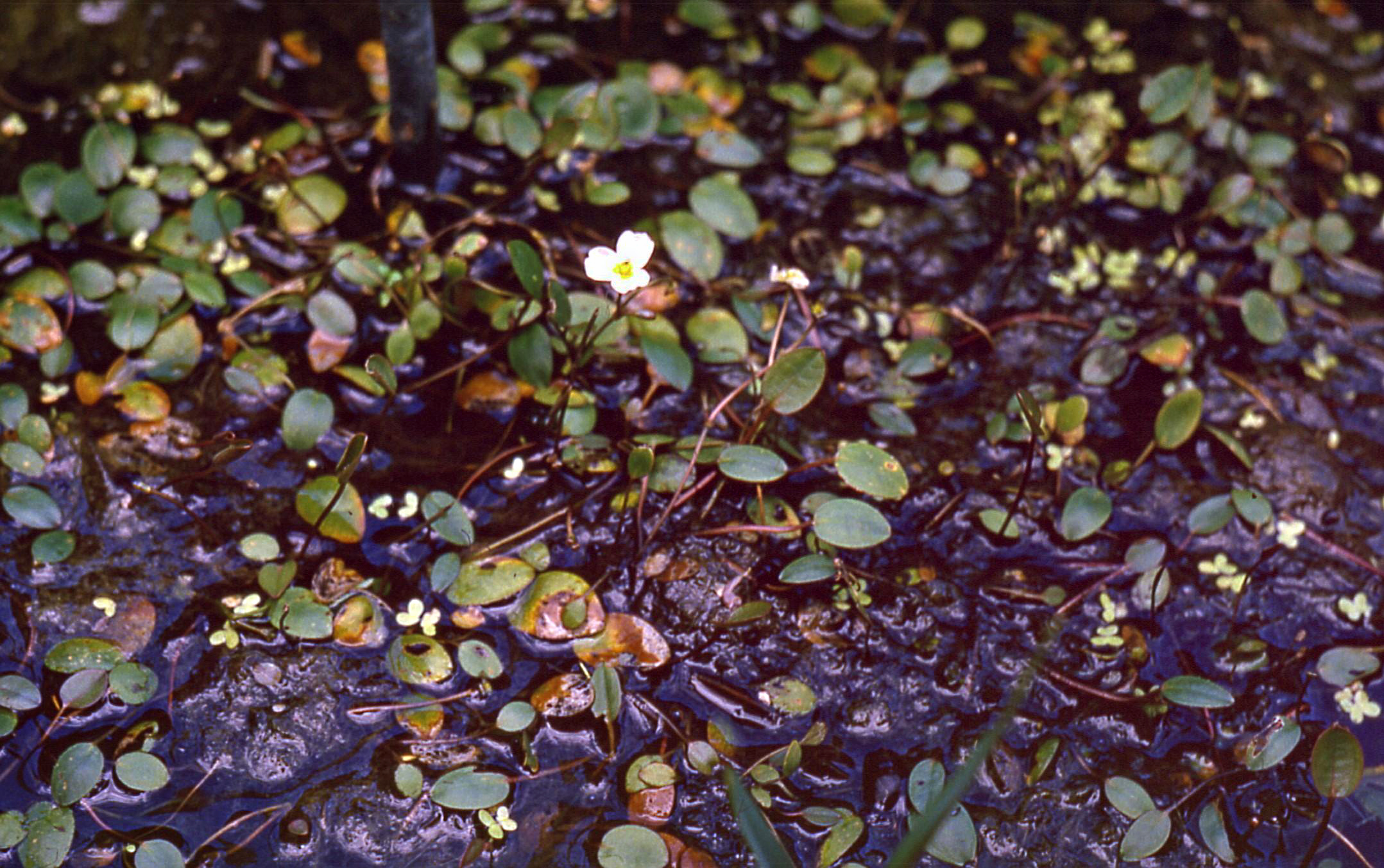

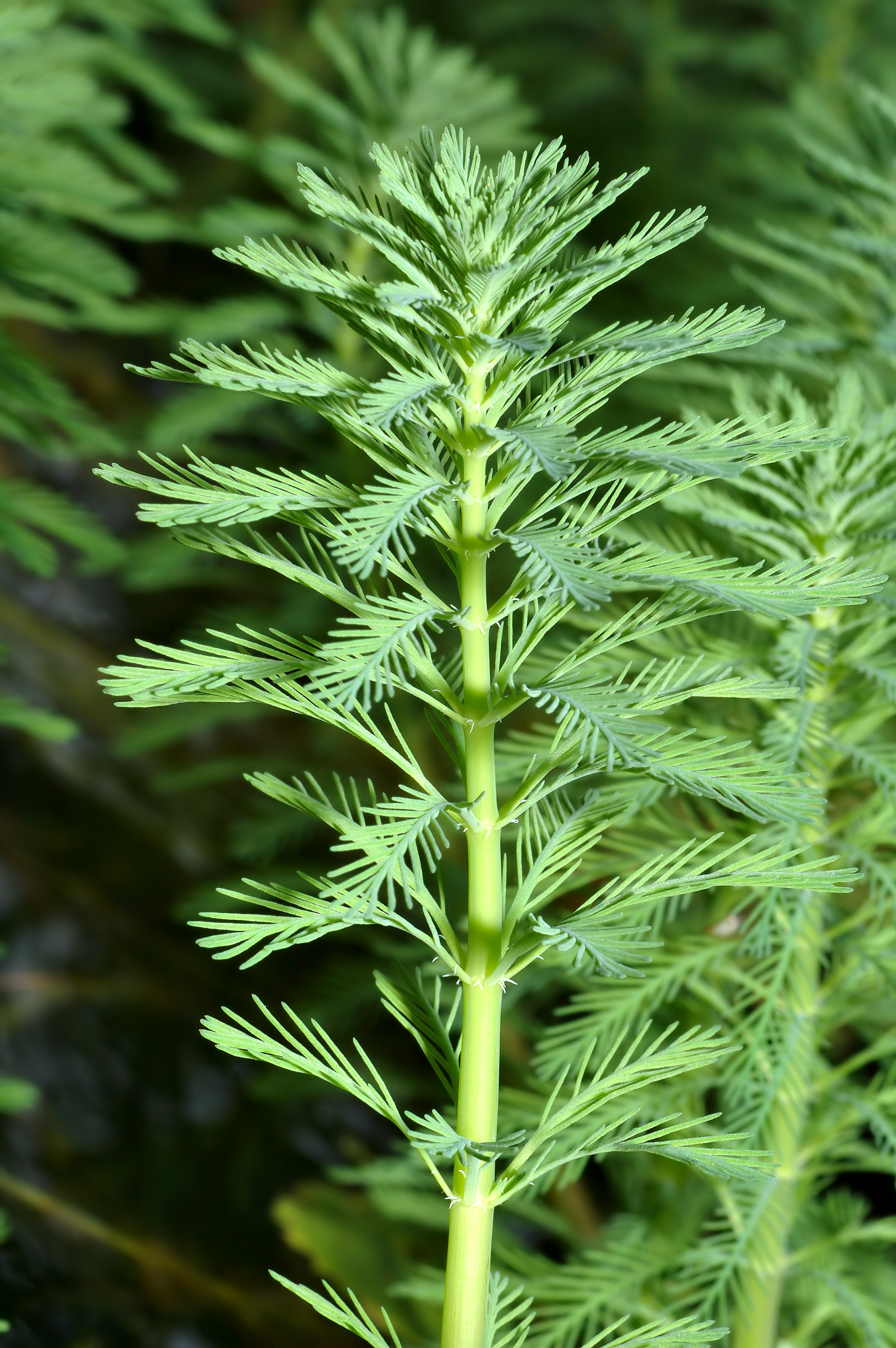

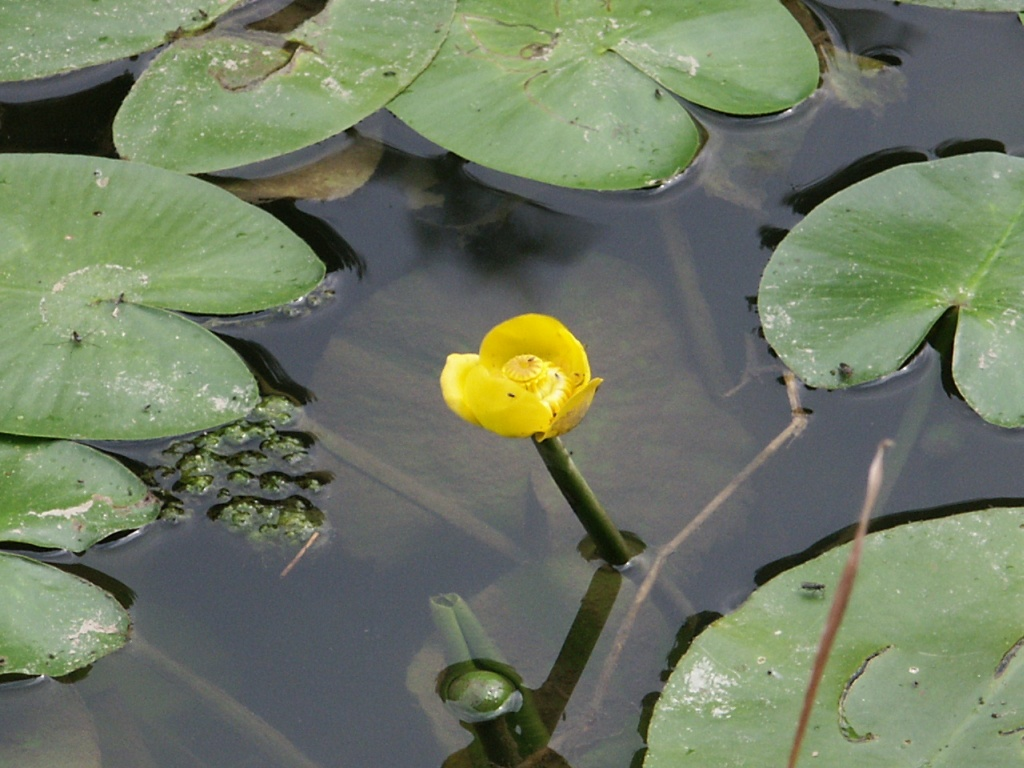

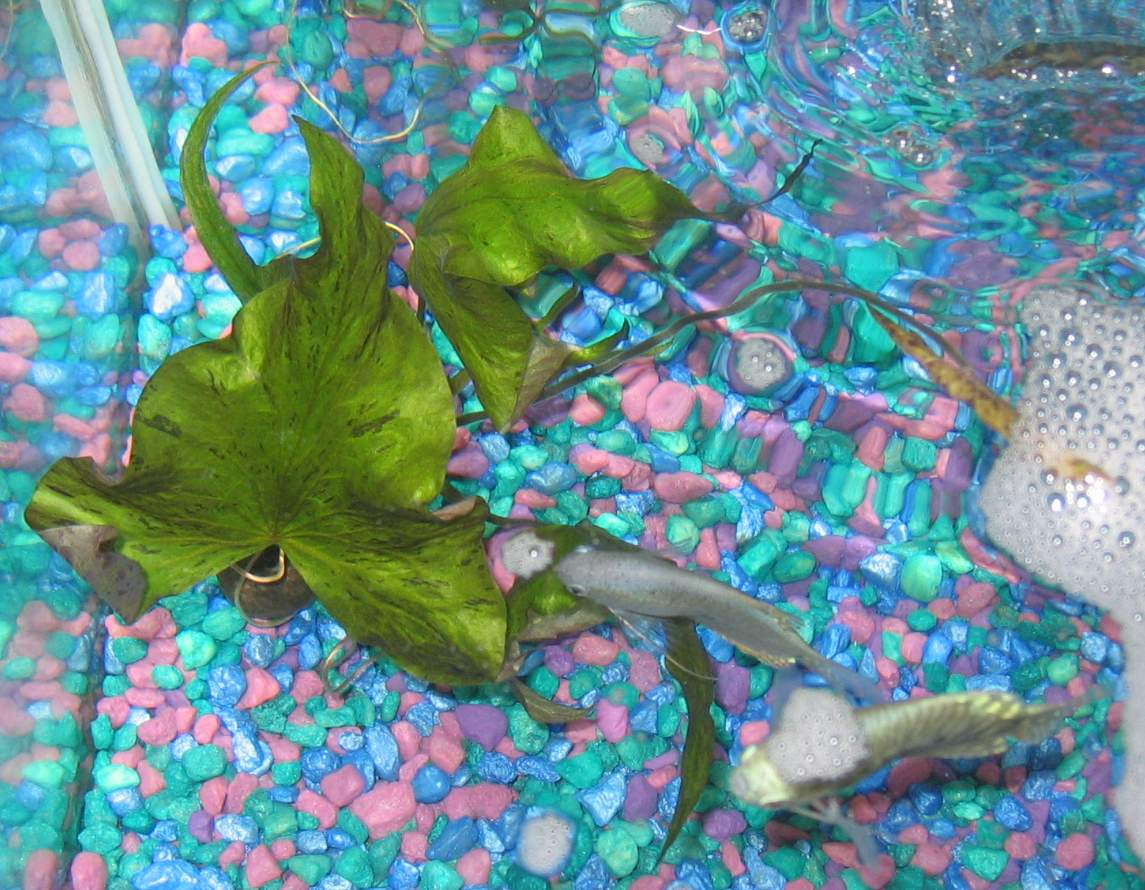
Nymphaea lotus

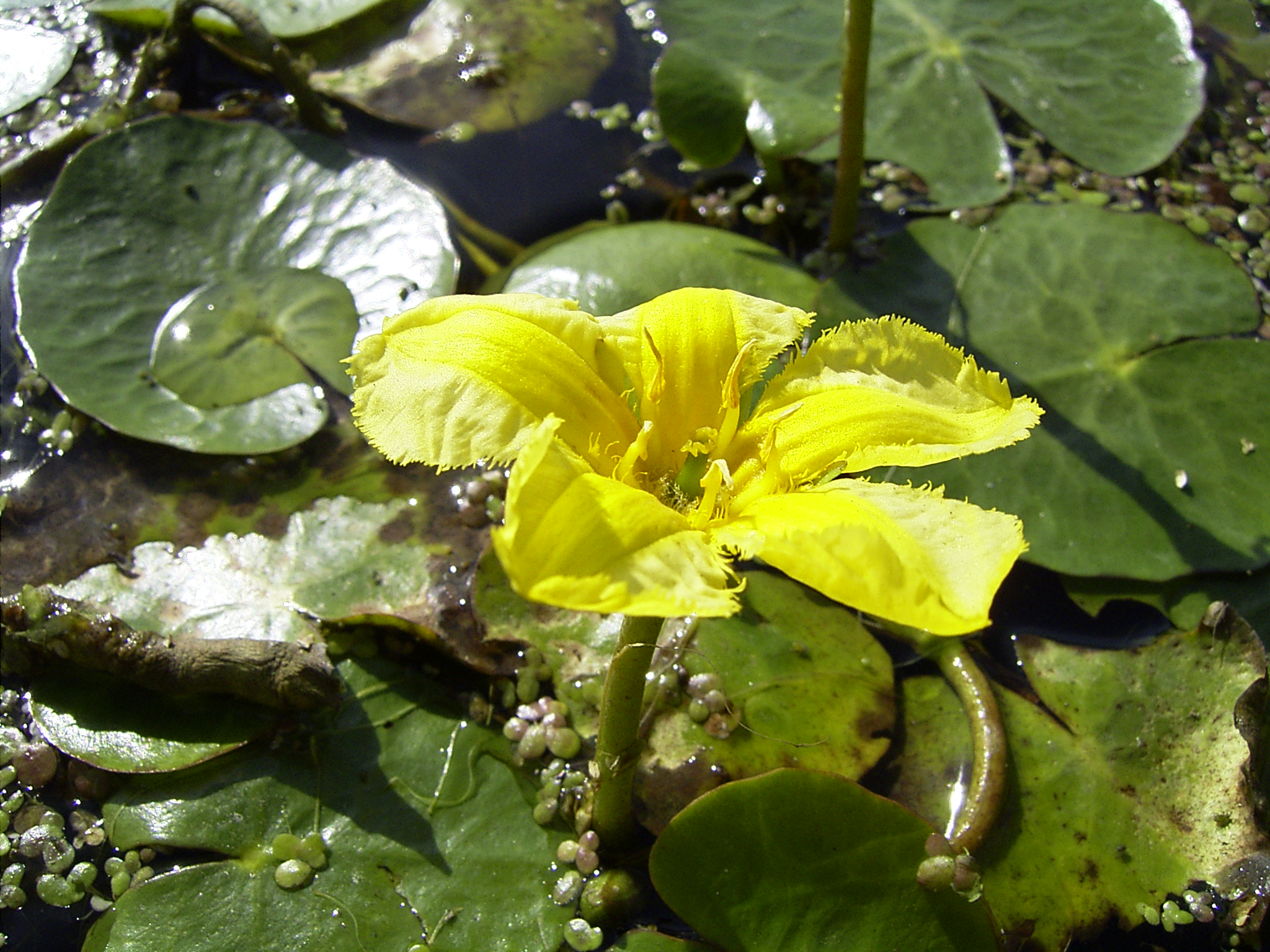
Nymphoides peltata

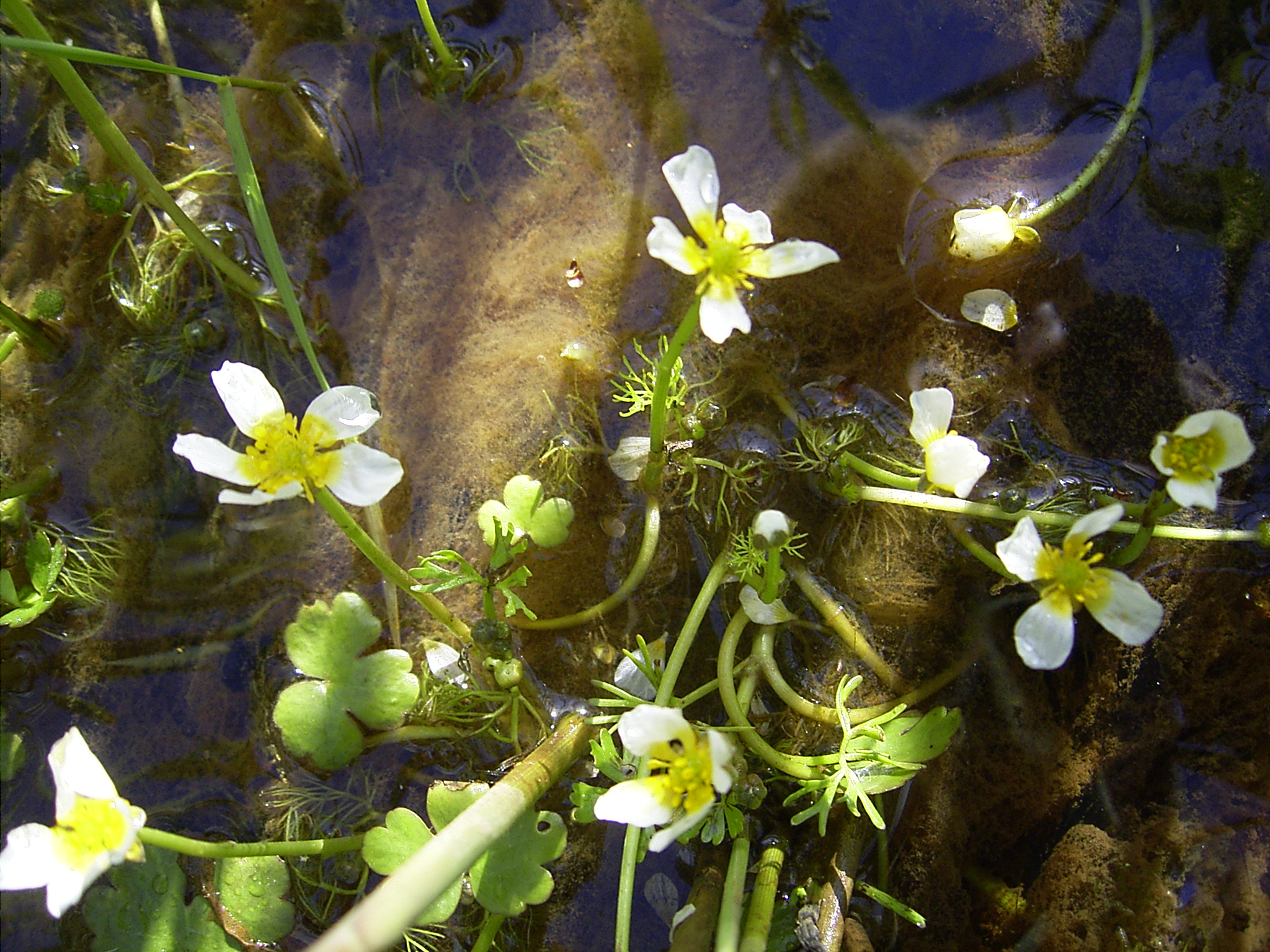
Ranunculus aquatilis

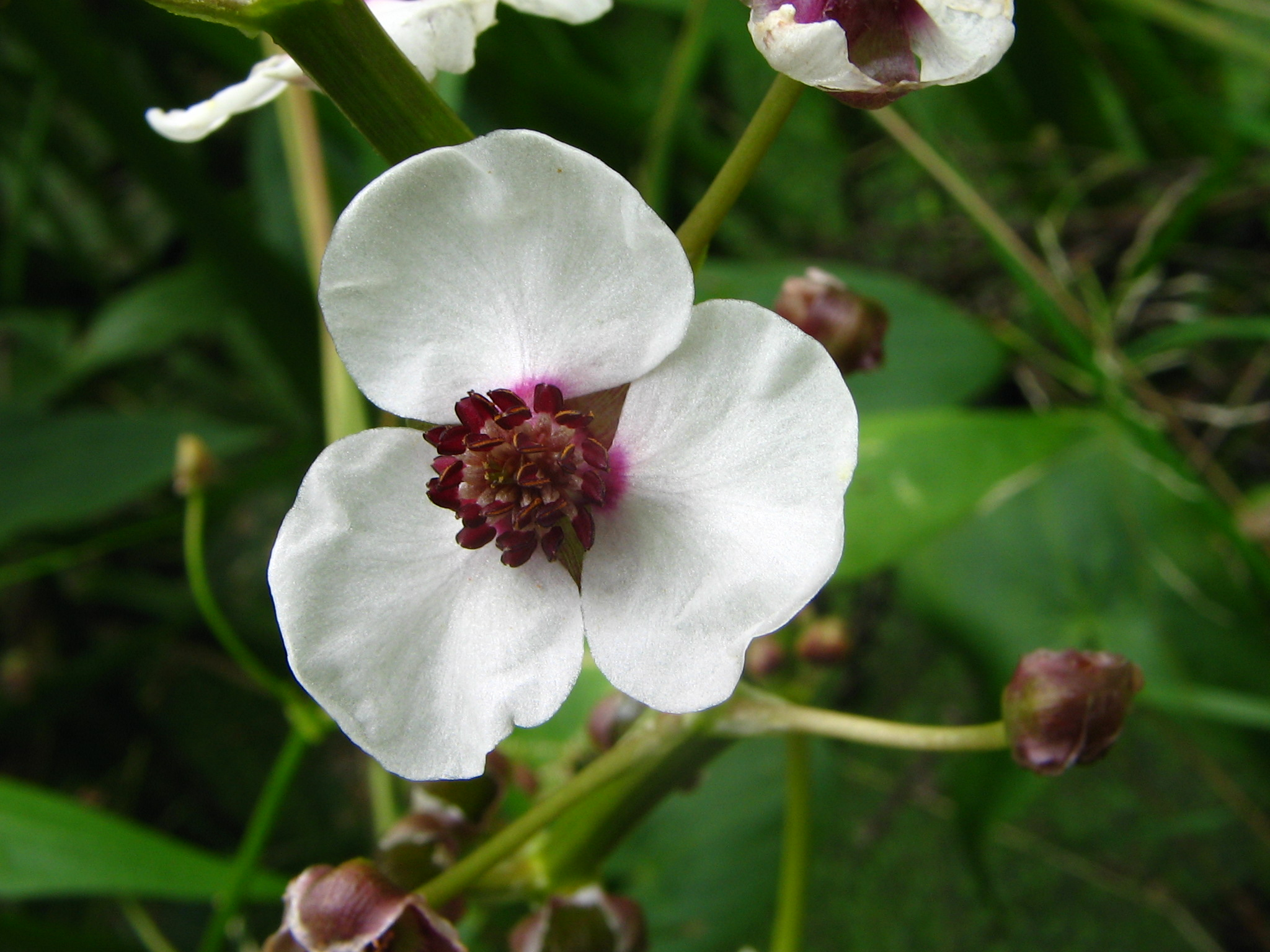
Sagittaria sagittifolia

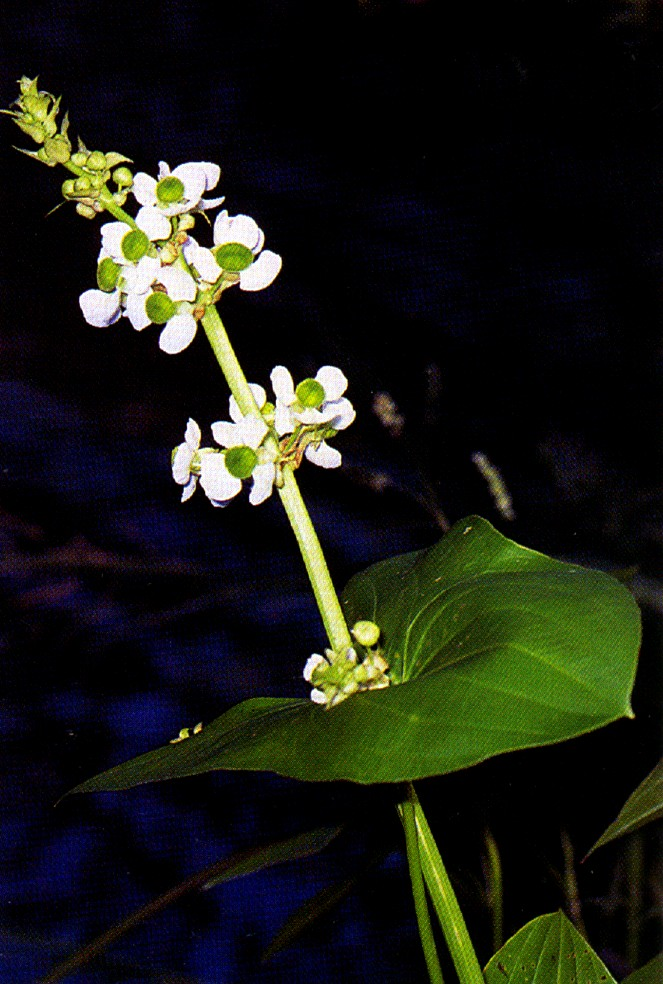
Sagittaria latifolia

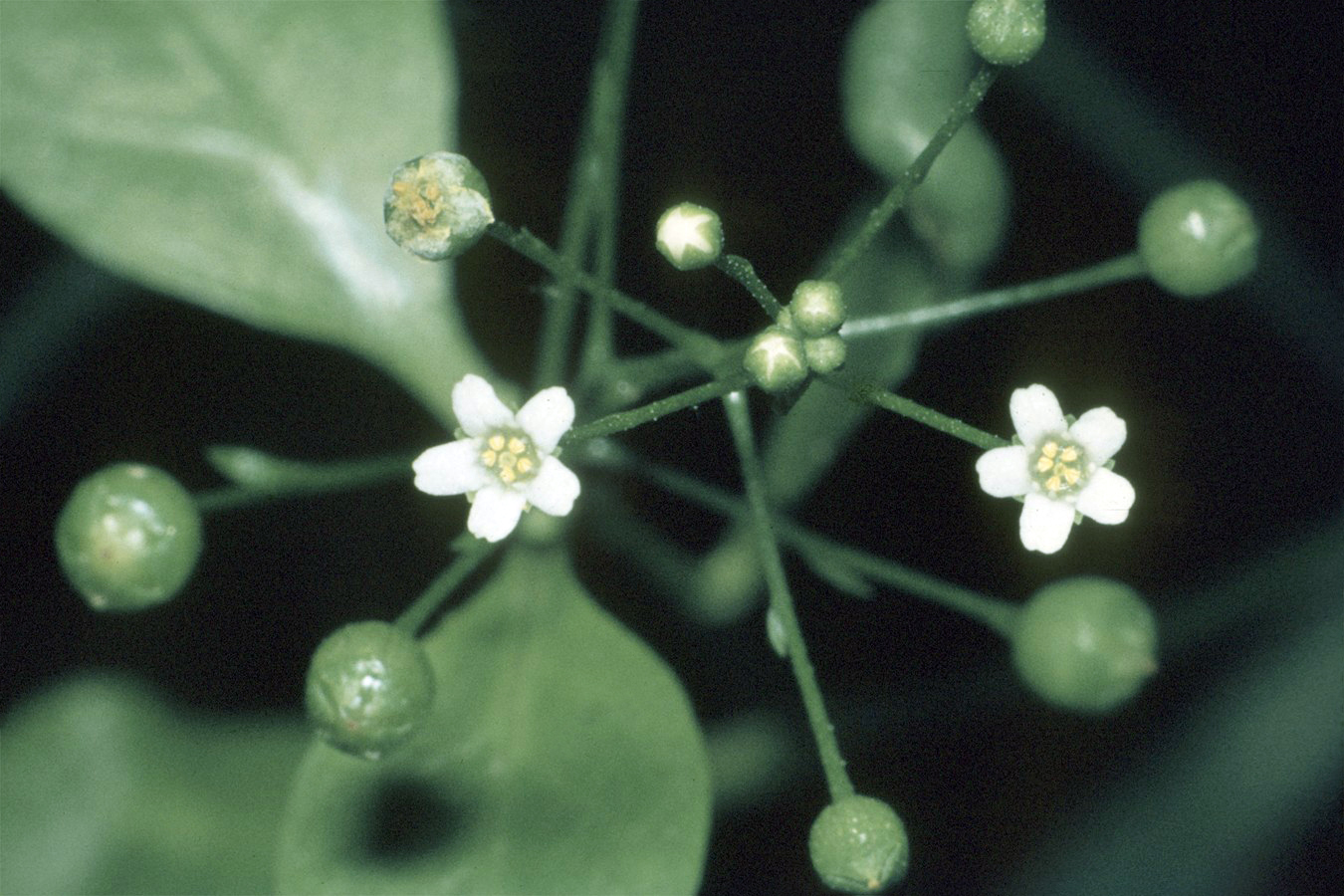

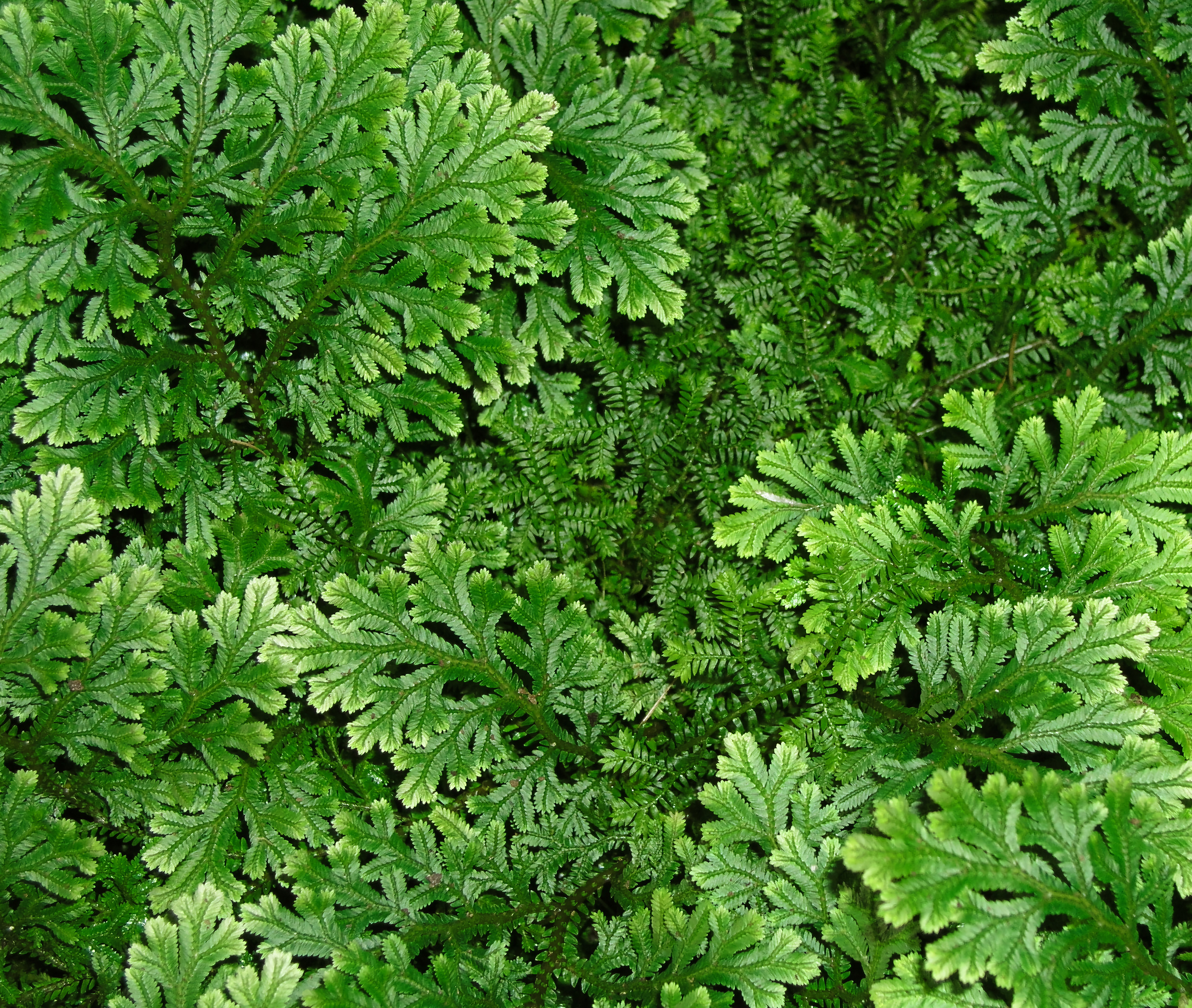

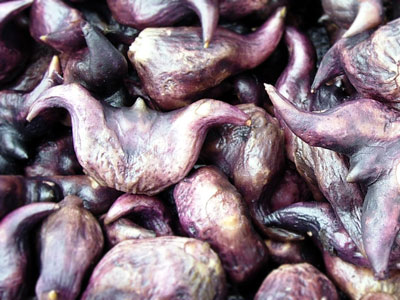
Trapa natans

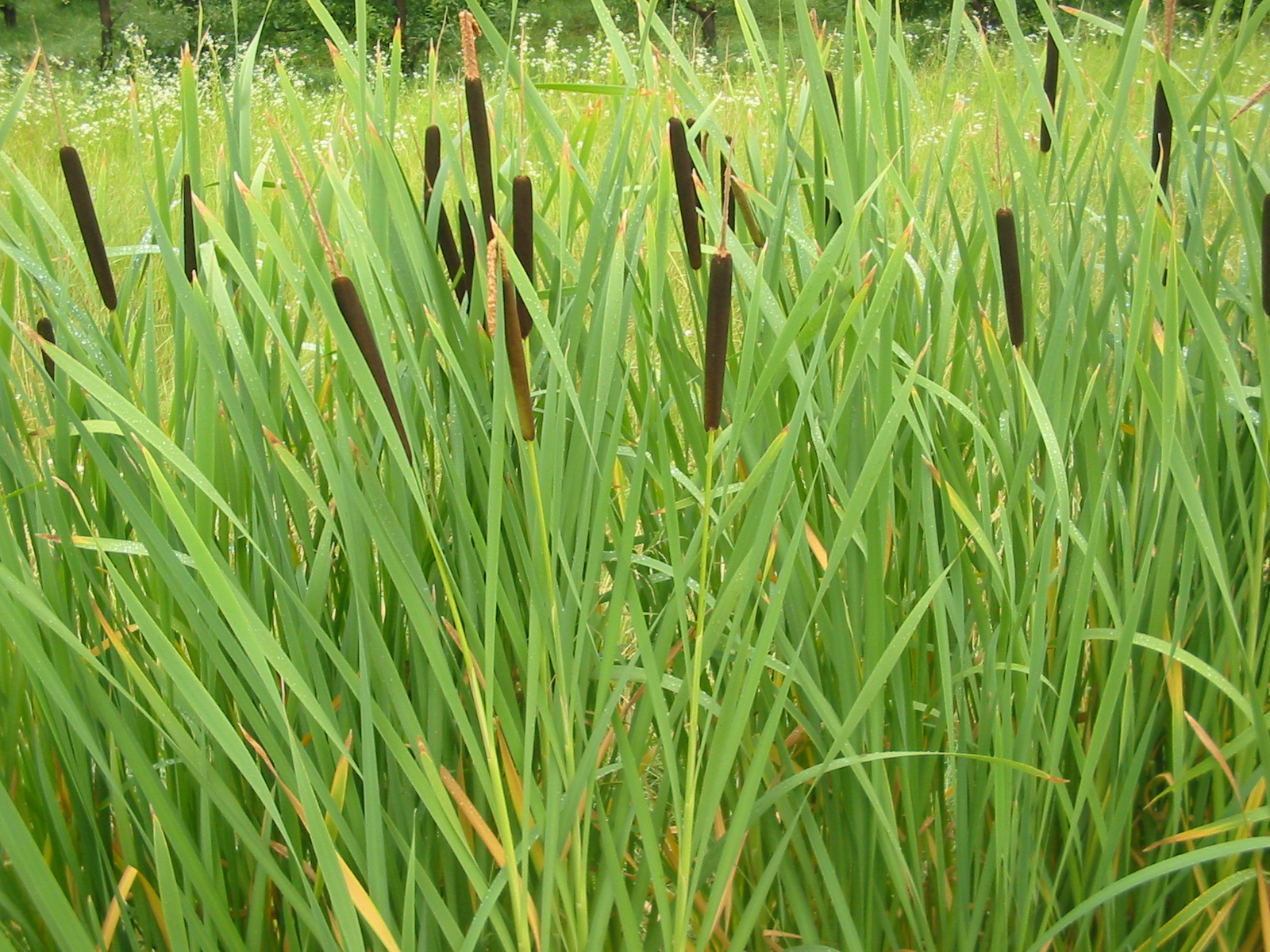

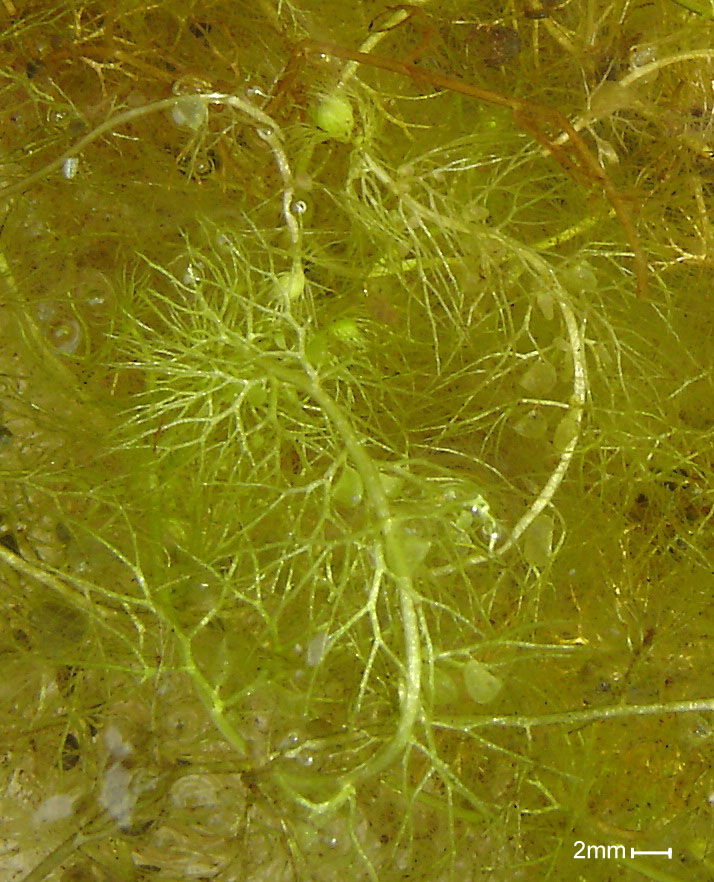
Utricularia vulgaris (common bladderwort)

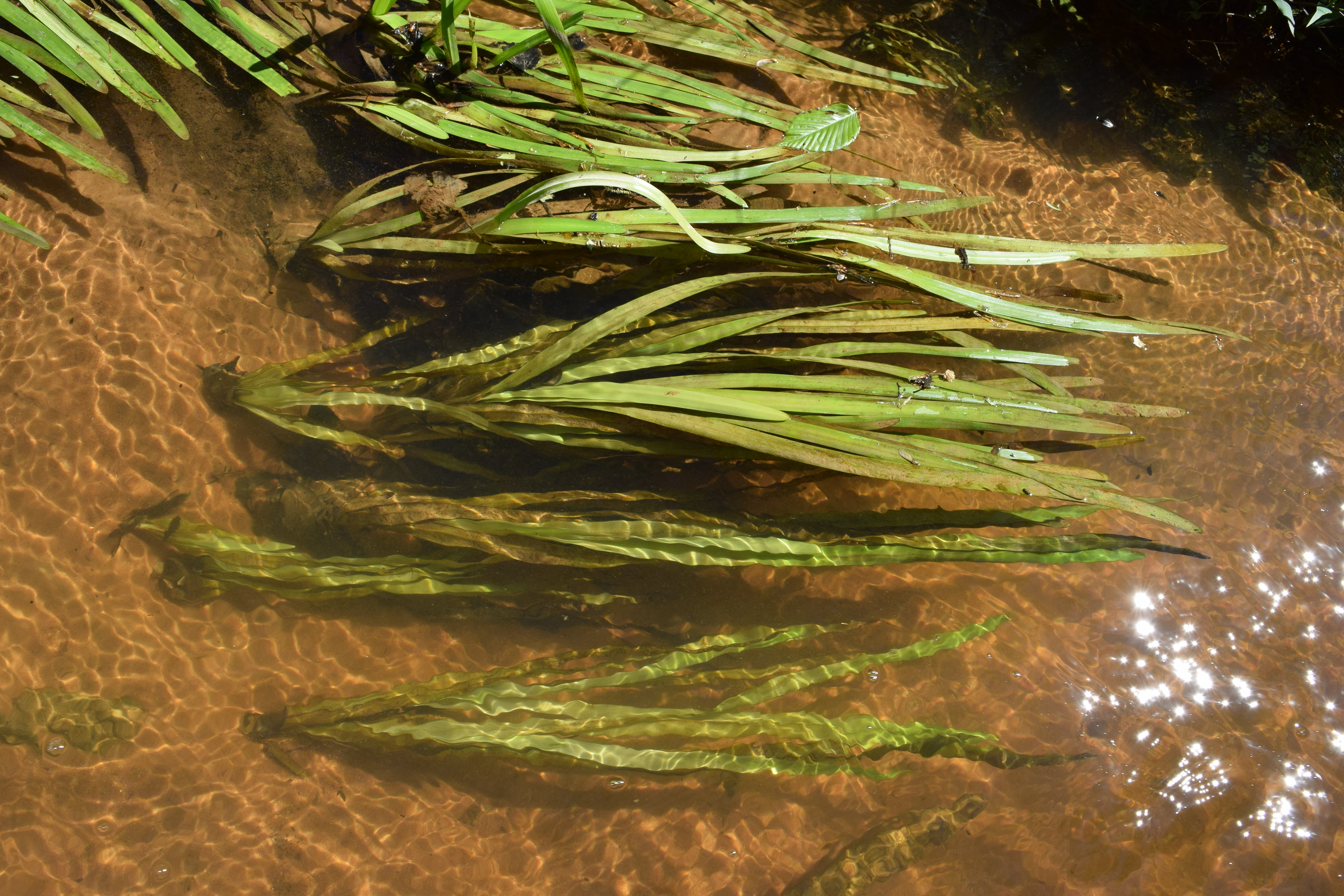
Vallisneria americana

=== Illustration ===
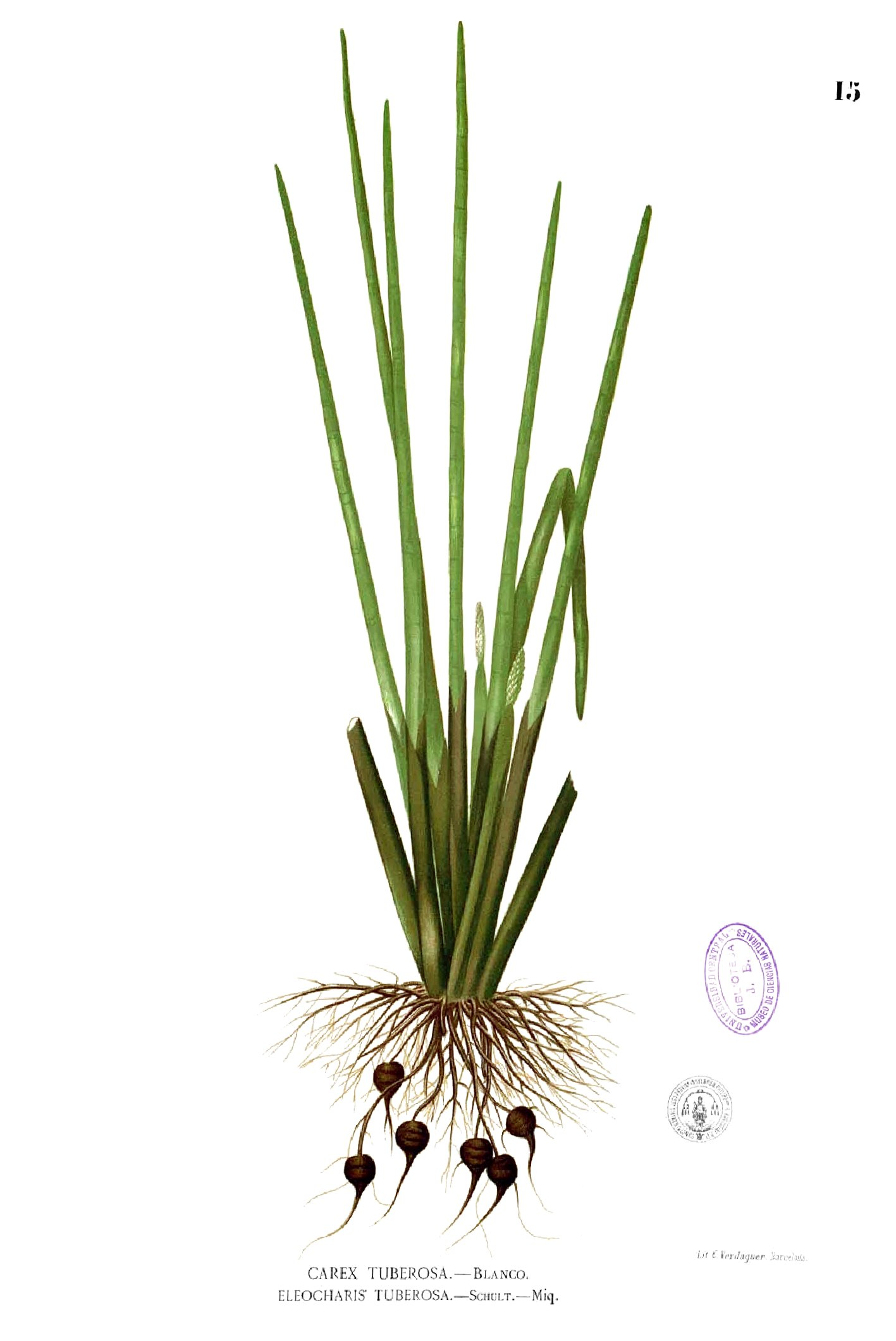
Eleocharis dulcis

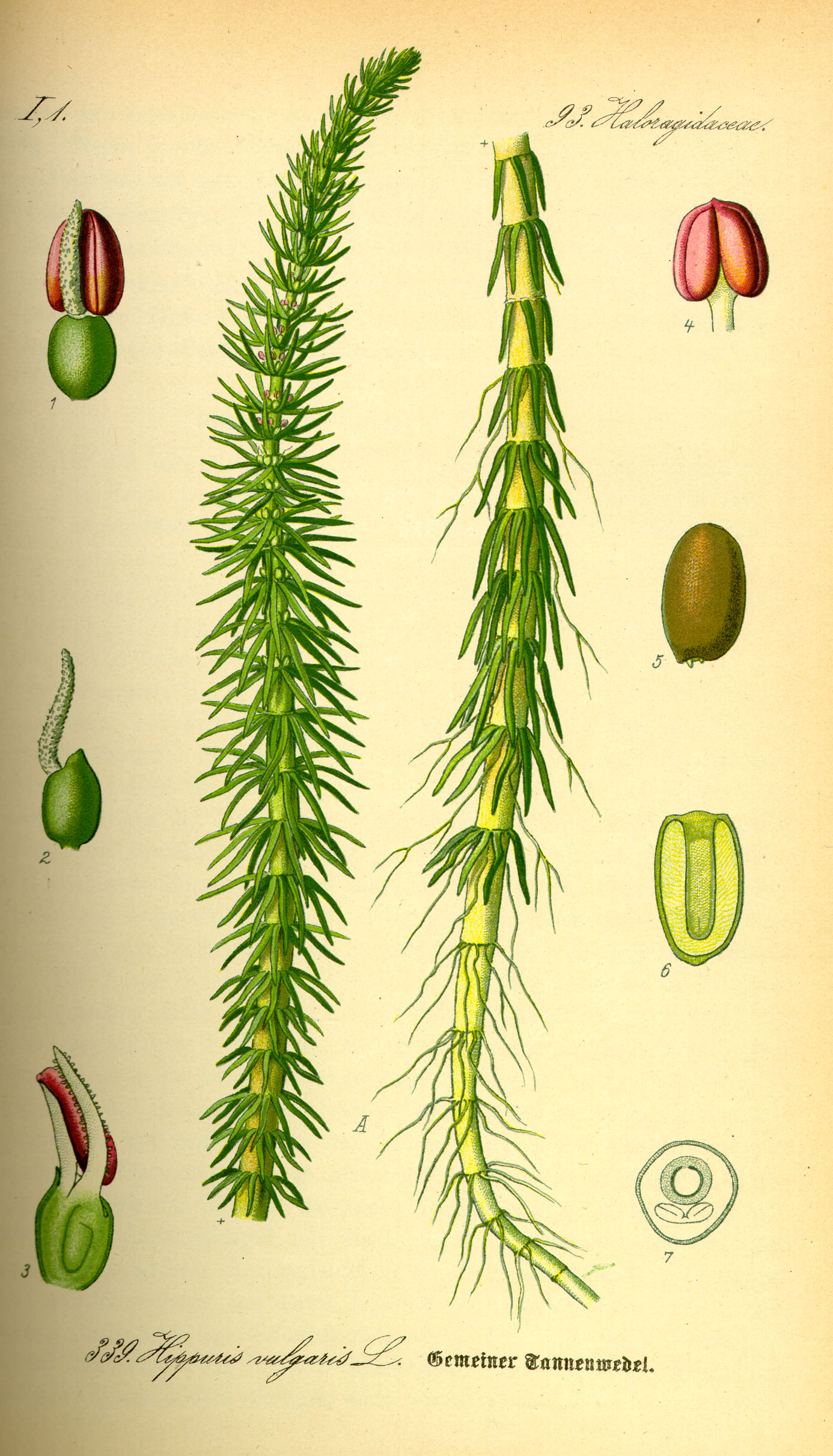
Hippuris vulgaris

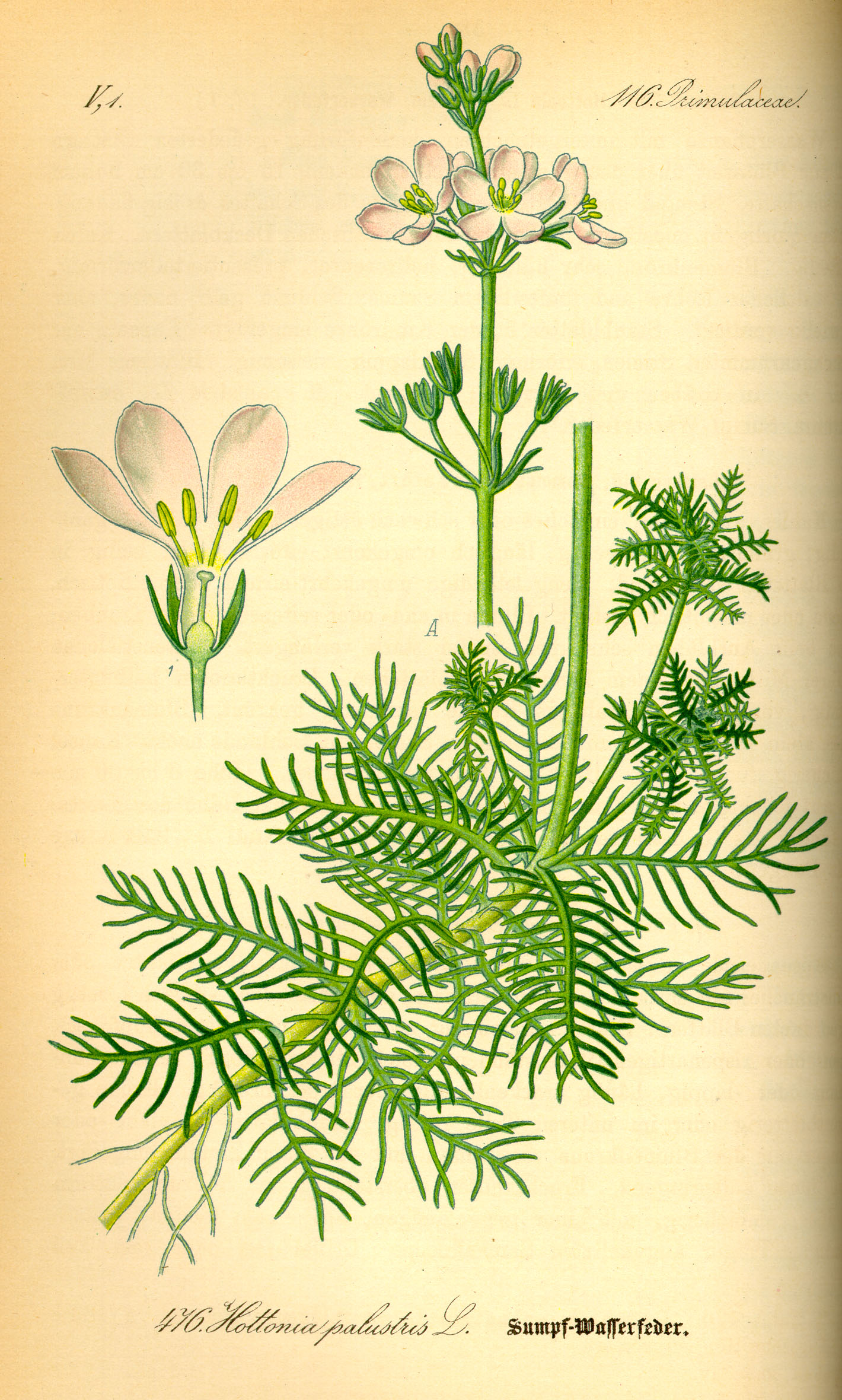
Hottonia palustris

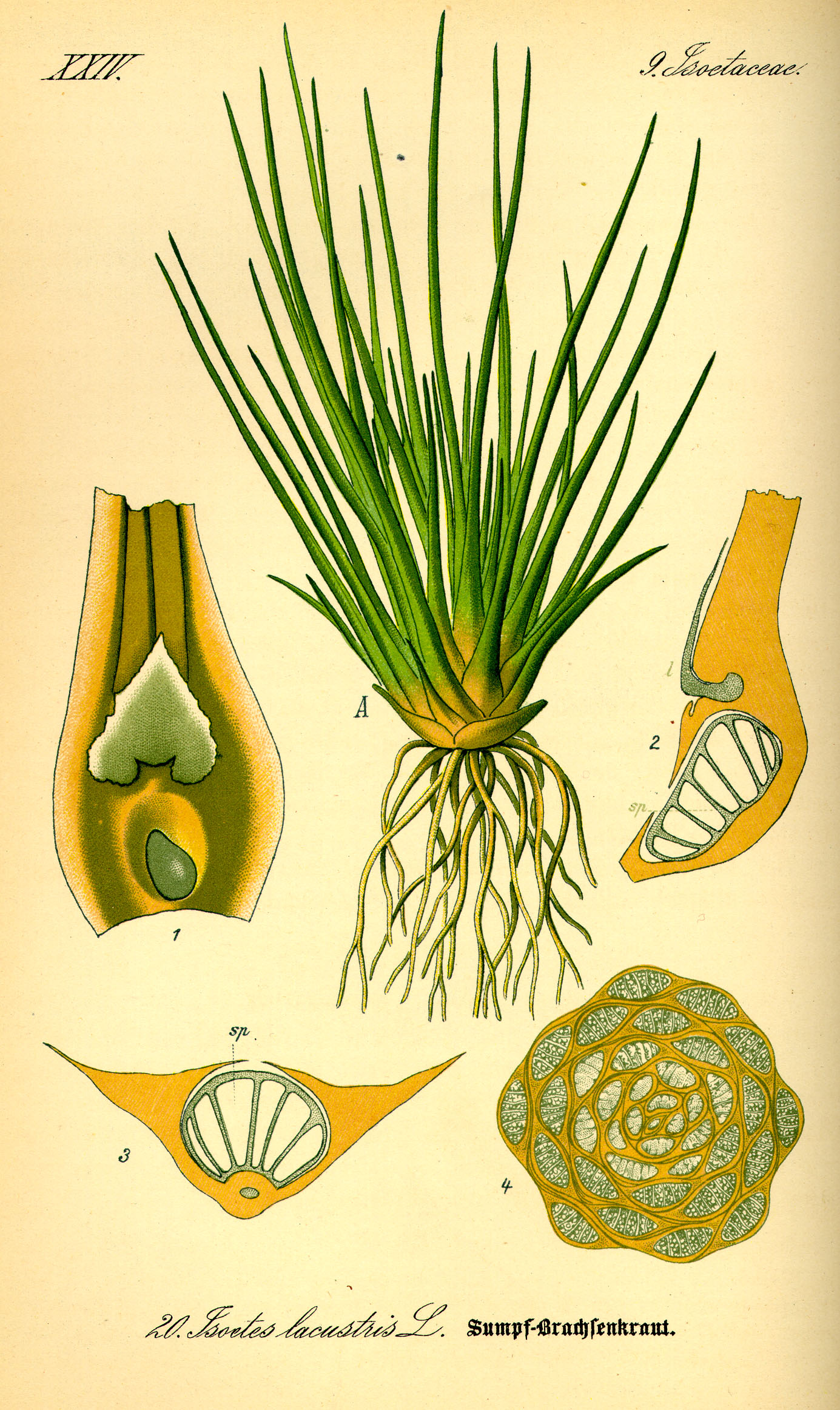
Isoetes lacustris

== See also ==
- List of freshwater aquarium fish species
