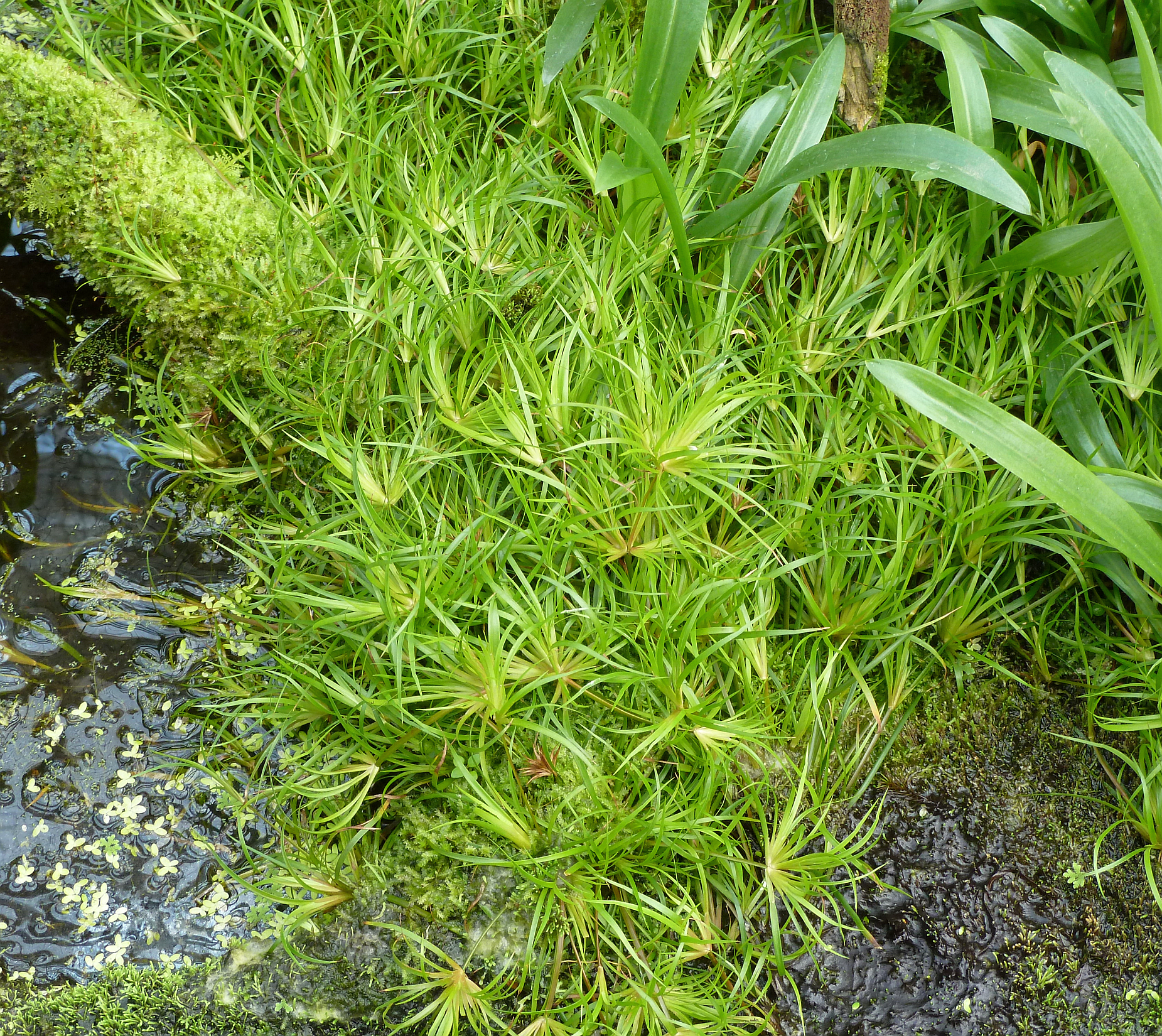
- Habit
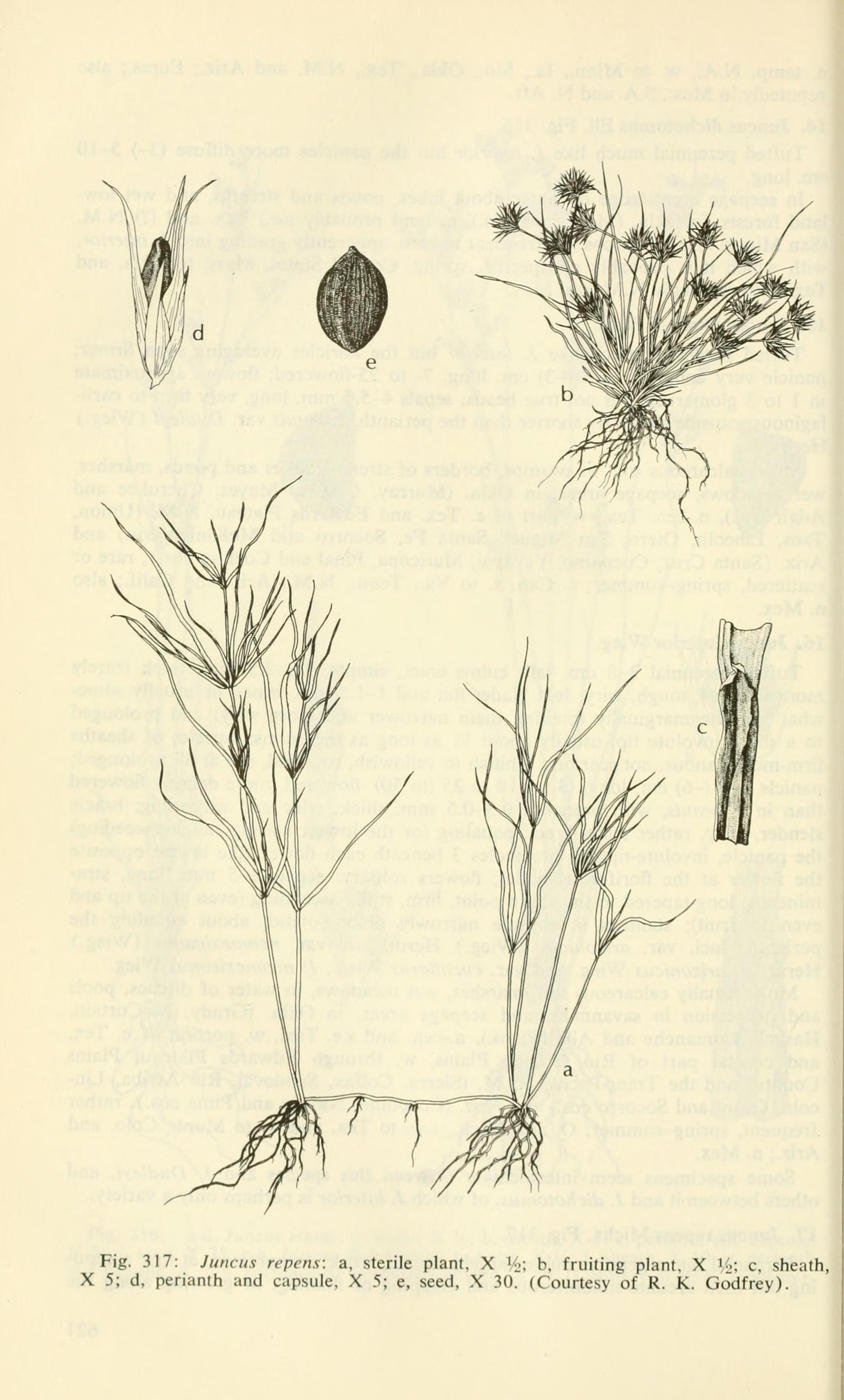
- Botanical illustration

Scientific classification
- Kingdom: Plantae
- Clade: Tracheophytes
- Clade: Angiosperms
- Clade: Monocots
- Clade: Commelinids
- Order: Poales
- Family: Juncaceae
- Genus: Juncus
- Species: J. repens

Binomial name
- Juncus repens Michx.

Synonyms
- Cephaloxys flabellata Desv.; Juncus subincurvus Steud.; Tristemon repens (Michx.) Raf.

= Juncus repens =

Species of plant

Juncus repens, the lesser creeping rush, is a species of flowering plant in the family Juncaceae. It is native to the southeastern United States, Cuba, and Tabasco in Mexico. It has been observed growing in habitats such as in streams, lakes, ponds, and within ditches. When fully submerged, it continues to grow, so it has found use as a freshwater aquarium plant.
