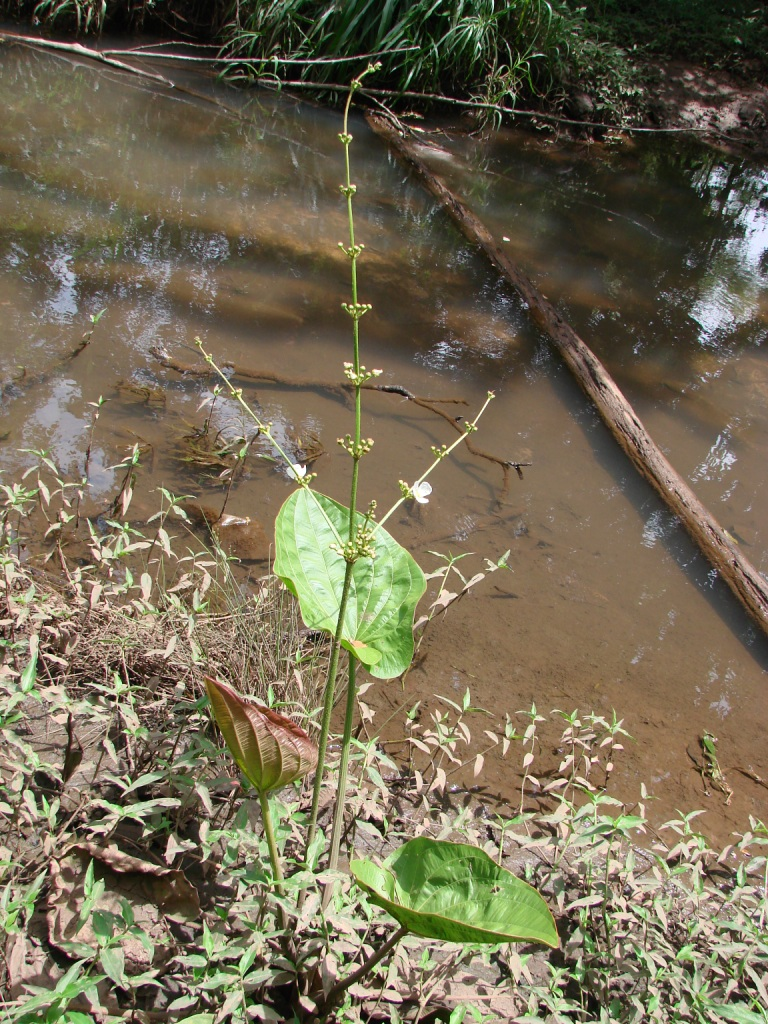

Scientific classification
- Kingdom: Plantae
- Clade: Tracheophytes
- Clade: Angiosperms
- Clade: Monocots
- Order: Alismatales
- Family: Alismataceae
- Genus: Echinodorus
- Species: E. macrophyllus

Binomial name
- Echinodorus macrophyllus Micheli

Synonyms
- Alisma macrophyllum Kunth; Sagittaria palifolia var. macrophylla (Kunth) Kuntze

= Echinodorus macrophyllus =

Species of aquatic plant

Echinodorus macrophyllus is a species of aquatic plants in the Alismataceae. It is native to Brazil and Bolivia.

== Description ==
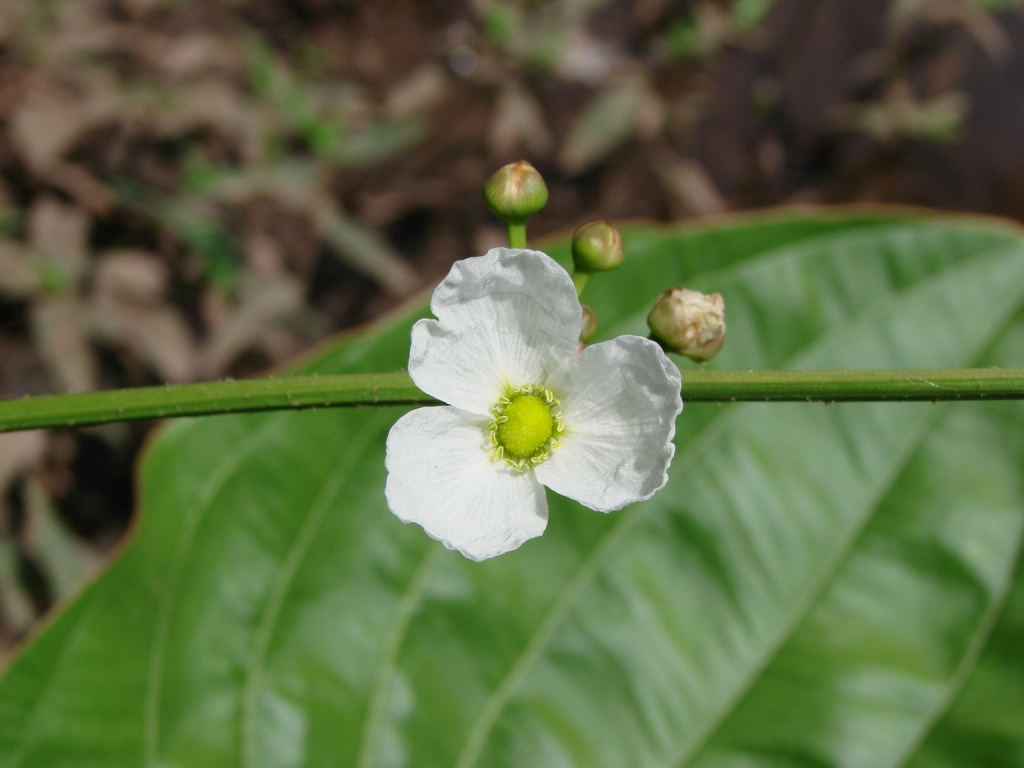
Flower of E. macrophyllus

Petioles 2 - 3 x longer than the blade, membranously alate on the base, thin to densely pilose under the blade. Pubescence simple or stellate and absent on young or submerged plants. Blade membranous, sagittato-cordate or triangularly obovate with long blunt lobes, approximately as wide as the midrib length and widest at the base. Blade (6.5) - 20 – 30 cm long and (7_ - 20 – 30 cm wide with 11 - 13 veins (7 - 15 are possible). No pellucid markings.

Stem upright, about twice as long as the leaves, cylindrical, between the whorls triangular, pubescent under whorls as well as petioles.

Inflorescence rarely racemose, usually paniculate having 6 - 13 whorls containing 6 - 9 flowers each. Bracts lanceolate, densely ribbed. Bracts in the first whorl as long as the pedicels; in the other whorls they are a third shorter. Pedicels 1 - 3.5 cm long, sepals broadly ovate, leather-like, densely ribbed, 5 – 6 mm long, petals white, obovate, 15 – 18 mm long, stamens 20 - 24, filaments longer than the anthers, pistils numerous, style longer than the ovary.

Aggregate fruit globular, echinate, 6 – 8 mm in diameter. Achenes flat, subovate-cuneate, 3 x 1.5 mm with 3 - 5 (usually 3) lateral ribs and 2 - 3 oblong and further 3 - 5 small round glands. Stylar beak usually straight, approximately 0.75 mm.

== Cultivation ==
E. macrophyllus best grows at tropical temperatures with plenty of light and a rich substrate. It can stand lower temperatures, however if acclimatised, it will stay rather smaller and grow more slowly. In smaller aquariums it will often quickly form emerse leaves, which prefer moist conditions. It is easy to grow and makes a very good specimen plant for a larger aquarium.

== Medicinal ==
It is suitable for aquariums and ornamental, and also medicinal use. The infusion tea leaf provides laxative. A survey has confirmed its effectiveness in cases of hypertension. It is also popularly used as a diuretic and antirheumatic against inflammation of skin and throat, rheumatism, arthritis and syphilis as blood purifier and eliminator of uric acid. The plant produces a rhizome which a mass is extracted. This mass can be made sweet, like pumpkin. This candy is very good as blood cleanser.

The plant is used in the production of Brazilian soft drinks Mineirinho and Mate.
