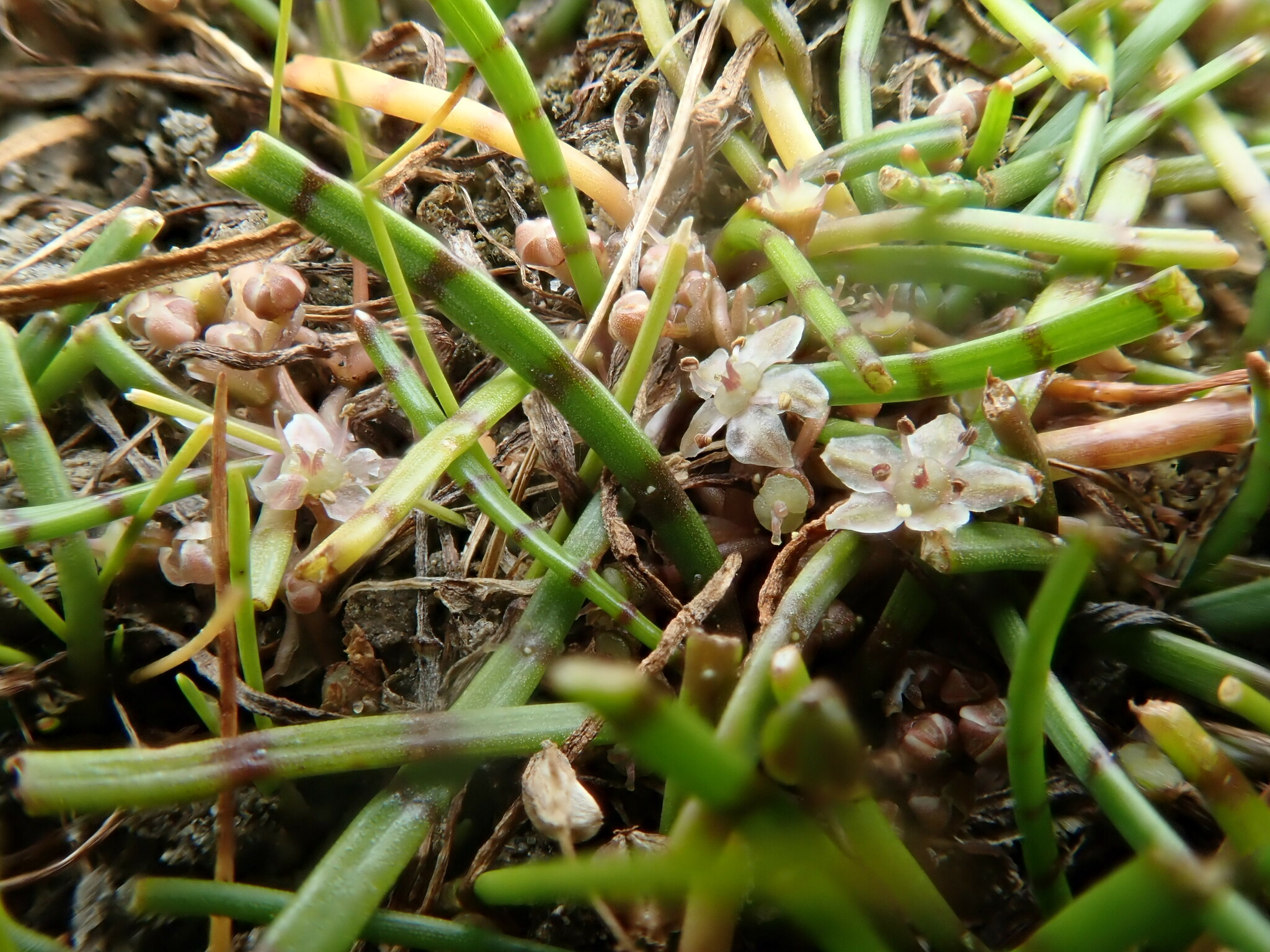
- Lilaeopsis novae-zelandiae near Kuku Beach, Manawatū–Whanganui

Conservation status
- Not Threatened (NZ TCS)

Scientific classification
- Kingdom: Plantae
- Clade: Tracheophytes
- Clade: Angiosperms
- Clade: Eudicots
- Clade: Asterids
- Order: Apiales
- Family: Apiaceae
- Genus: Lilaeopsis
- Species: L. novae-zelandiae

Binomial name
- Lilaeopsis novae-zelandiae (Gand.) A.W.Hill

= Lilaeopsis novae-zelandiae =

Species of flowering plant

Lilaeopsis novae-zelandiae is a species of flowering plant in the parsely family Apiaceae, found in New Zealand and Tasmania. Some authorities consider it endemic to New Zealand. It is an obligate wetland inhabitant.

== Description ==
The species is grasslike but not closely related to true grasses. The rhizomes are creeping and feature branching phyllodes. Flowers are white.
