= Cyperus helferi =

Scientific classification
- Kingdom: Plantae
- Clade: Tracheophytes
- Clade: Angiosperms
- Clade: Monocots
- Clade: Commelinids
- Order: Poales
- Family: Cyperaceae
- Genus: Cyperus
- Species: C. helferi

Binomial name
- Cyperus helferi Boeckeler, 1874

Species of sedge

Cyperus helferi is a species of sedge that is native to parts of South East Asia.

Cyperus helferi is an aquatic plant species that belongs to the family Cyperaceae. It is native to Thailand, where it grows naturally in streams, rivers, and other bodies of water with slow-moving or still water.

Cyperus helferi is a popular plant in the aquarium hobby because of its unique appearance and ease of care. It has narrow, grass-like leaves that can grow up to 30 centimeters in length and 1-2 millimeters in width. The leaves are bright green in color and have a distinctive curling or twisting habit, which gives the plant a unique and attractive appearance.

In aquariums, Cyperus helferi is often used as a mid-ground or foreground plant. It is relatively undemanding in terms of light and nutrients, and can thrive in a wide range of water conditions. However, it does require a substrate rich in nutrients and CO_{2} supplementation to achieve optimal growth and health.

In addition to its ornamental value, Cyperus helferi is also beneficial for aquarium ecosystems. It helps to oxygenate the water, remove excess nutrients and pollutants, and provide shelter and spawning sites for fish and other aquatic organisms.

== See also ==
- List of Cyperus species
