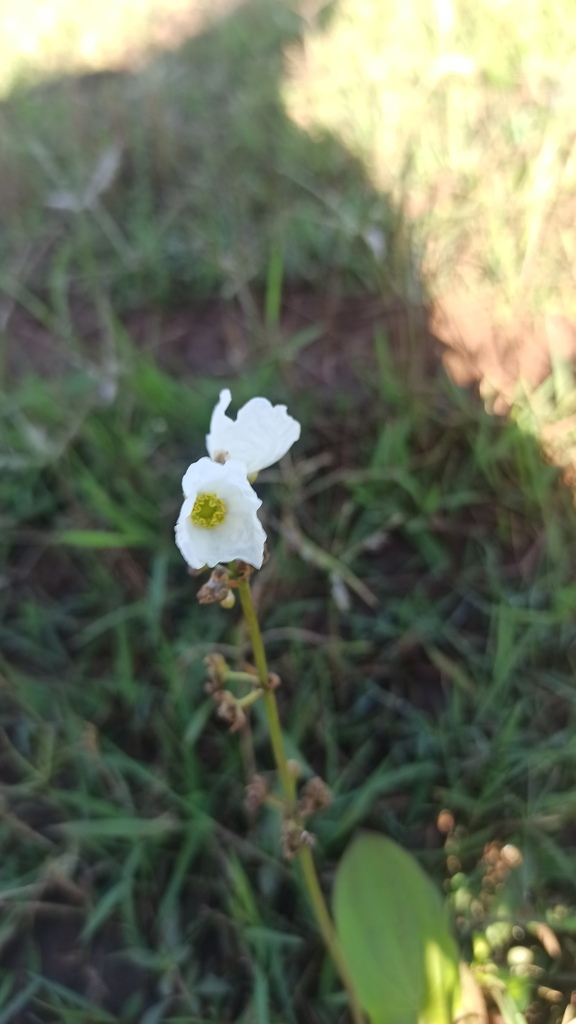

Scientific classification
- Kingdom: Plantae
- Clade: Tracheophytes
- Clade: Angiosperms
- Clade: Monocots
- Order: Alismatales
- Family: Alismataceae
- Genus: Echinodorus
- Species: E. longiscapus

Binomial name
- Echinodorus longiscapus Archavaleta

Synonyms
- Echinodorus grandiflorus var. longiscapus (Arechav.) Hauman; Echinodorus sellowianus Buchenau in H.G.A.Engler; Echinodorus sellowianus var. major Buchenau in H.G.A.Engler; Echinodorus sellowianus var. minor Buchenau in H.G.A.Engler; Echinodorus sellowianus var. longiscapus (Arechav.) Buchenau in H.G.A.Engler; Echinodorus longiscapus var. major Herter; Echinodorus longiscapus var. minor (Buchenau) Tronc.; Echinodorus aschersonianus var. nulliglandulosus Rataj

= Echinodorus longiscapus =

Species of aquatic plant

Echinodorus longiscapus is a perennial, aquatic plant of the Alismataceae, native to South America (Brazil, Paraguay, Uruguay and Argentina). It is cultivated as a pond or aquarium plant.

== Description ==
Leaves long-petioled, petioles 1.5 - 3 x longer than the blades. Blades oval, ovate or cordate, at the tip obtuse or shortly acuminate, at the base lobate or abrupt, 9 – 11 cm long x 7 – 8 cm wide, in the terrestrial forms often only 3 cm long x 2 cm wide. Submersed blades oval or ovate, often nearly rounded. Blades trimmed with pellucid lines to 2 mm long. Stem erect, longer than the leaves, glabrous or rarely scabrous, 30 – 80 cm long. Inflorescence racemose having 3 - 9 whorls containing 6 - 12 flowers each, proliferous. Bracts as long as the pedicels, or hardly longer, to 1.5 cm long, having 9 - 11 ribs and membraneous margins. Pedicels usually 1 - (2.5) cm long, sepals 5 – 6 mm long having 16 - 20 undistinct ribs, petals white, 1.7 – 2 cm long, corolla 2.5 – 4 cm in diameter. Stamens 20 - 25, anthers as long as the filaments, pistils numerous. Aggregate fruit globular or ovate, 5 – 7 mm in diameter. Achenes 2 - 2.3 mm long x 0.9 – 1 mm wide having usually 4 lateral ribs and (1) - 3 glands placed in a row in the upper half of the body. Beak erect or bent, 0.5 mm long.

== Cultivation ==
Propagated by division or adventitious plantlets. Seeds germinate freely. Easy to cultivate and seems to withstand a wide range of water conditions and temperatures.
