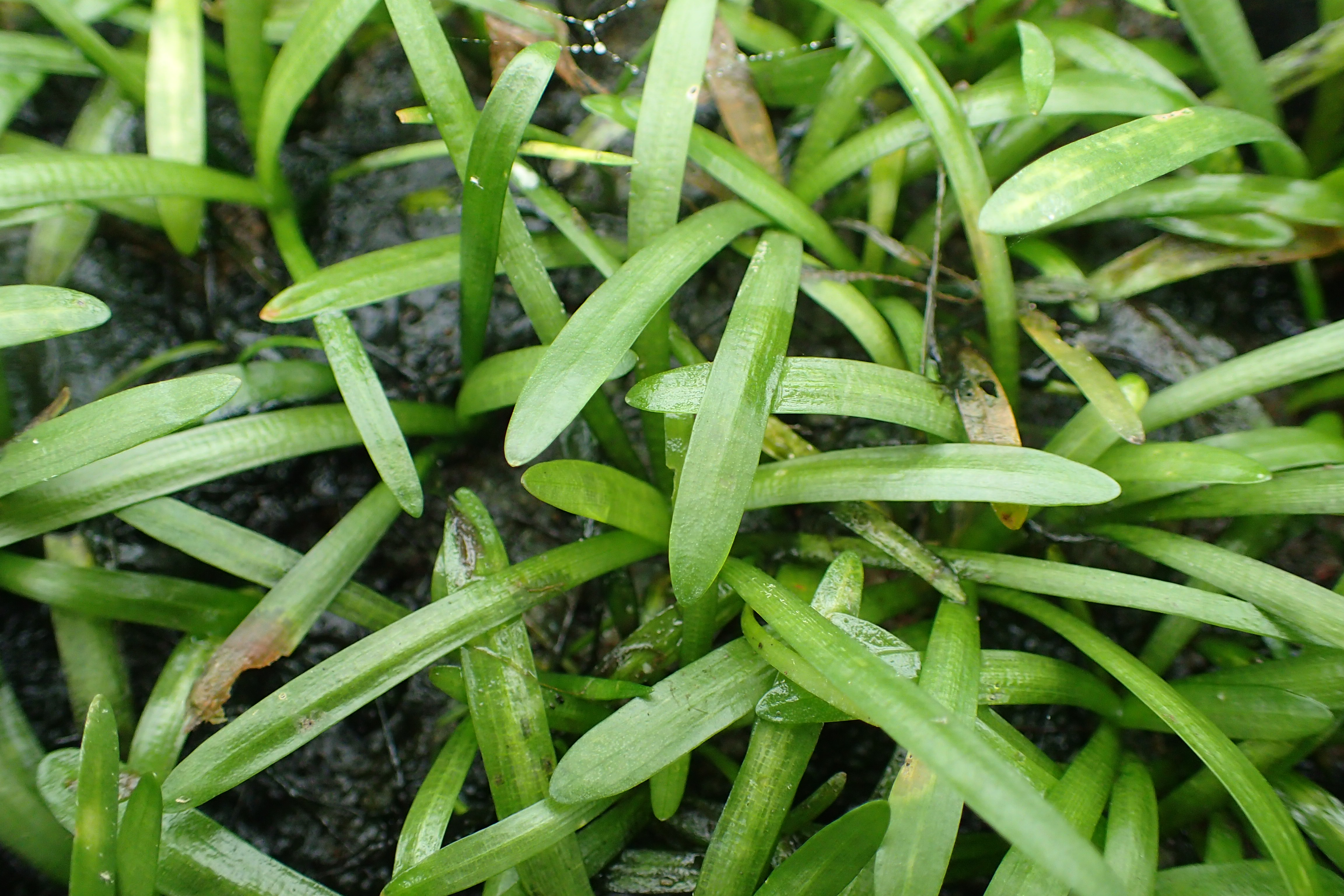

Scientific classification
- Kingdom: Plantae
- Clade: Tracheophytes
- Clade: Angiosperms
- Clade: Monocots
- Order: Alismatales
- Family: Alismataceae
- Genus: Sagittaria
- Species: S. subulata

Binomial name
- Sagittaria subulata (L.) Buchenau

Synonyms
- Alisma subulatum L.; Sagittaria lorata (Chapm.) Small; Sagittaria natans var. lorata Chapm.; Sagittaria natans var. pusilla (Nutt.) Chapm.; Sagittaria pusilla Nutt.; Sagittaria subulata subsp. lorata (Chapm.) R.T.Clausen; Sagittaria subulata var. lorata (Chapm.) Fernald; Sagittaria subulata var. pusilla (Nutt.) Buchenau

= Sagittaria subulata =

Species of flowering plant

Sagittaria subulata, the awl-leaf arrowhead, narrow-leaved arrowhead or dwarf sagittaria, is an aquatic plant species native to the Americas.

== Description ==
It is a perennial herb up to 40 centimetres (16 inches) tall. The leaves are submersed or floating, narrowly linear to ovate, not lobed. The inflorescence floats on the surface of the water.

== Distribution and habitat ==
It is native to Colombia, Venezuela, and every US state along the coast from Massachusetts to Louisiana. It has also been reported as naturalized in Great Britain on just three occasions; only one of these is recent and it appears to have become extinct by 2010. It is also recorded as a non-native on the Azores, and on the Island of Java in Indonesia. It grows primarily in shallow brackish water along the seacoast, in marshes, estuaries, etc.

== Conservation ==
It is listed as special concern in Connecticut, as endangered in Massachusetts, as rare in Pennsylvania, and as historical in Rhode Island.
