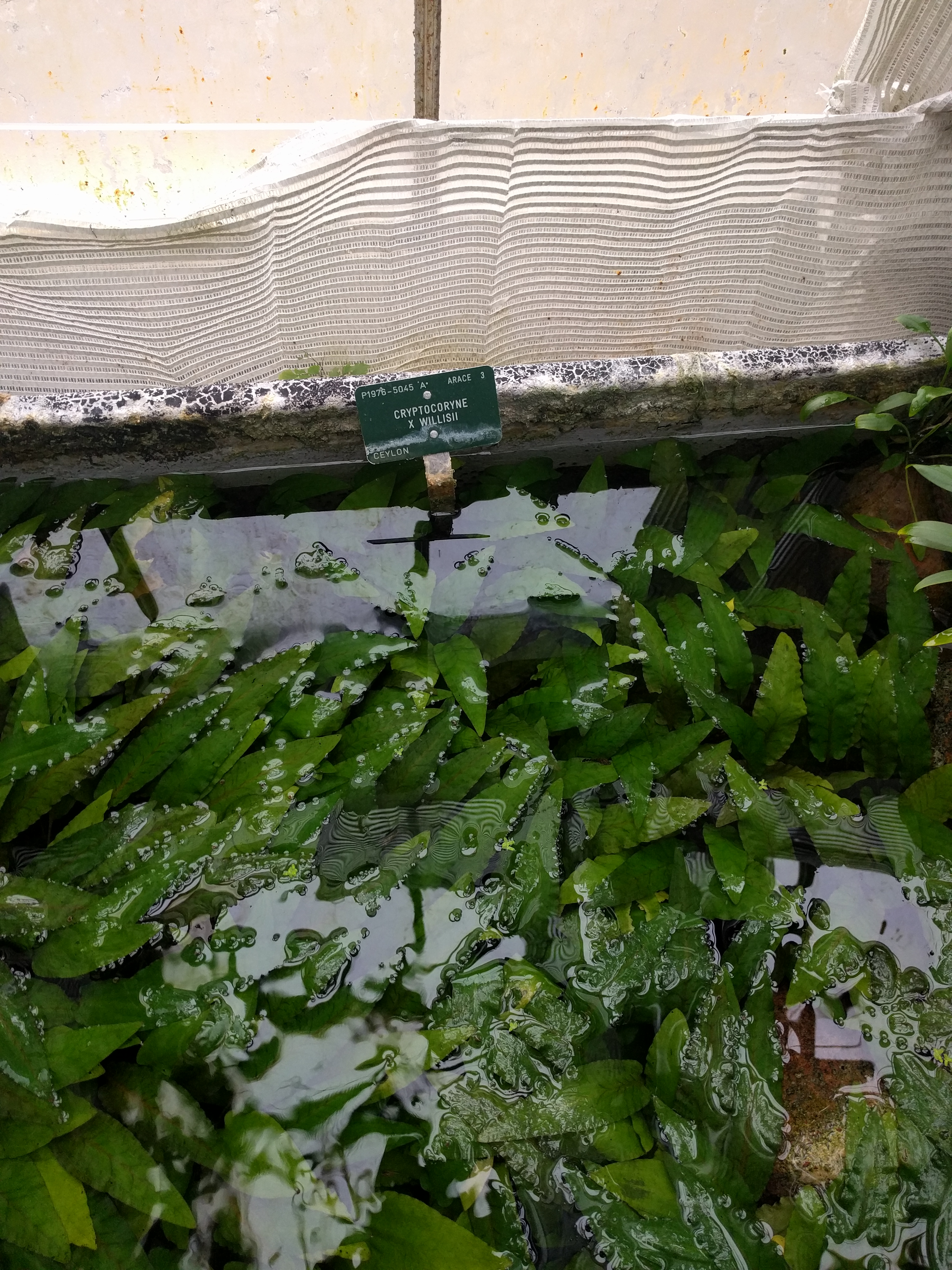

Scientific classification
- Kingdom: Plantae
- Clade: Tracheophytes
- Clade: Angiosperms
- Clade: Monocots
- Order: Alismatales
- Family: Araceae
- Genus: Cryptocoryne
- Species: C. × willisii

Binomial name
- Cryptocoryne × willisii Reitz

= Cryptocoryne × willisii =

Species of aquatic plant

Cryptocoryne × willisii is a plant in the family Araceae.

== Synonyms ==
Cryptocoryne nevillii (a valid but different species); C. lucens is now considered a hybrid in the C. × willisii complex

== Taxonomy ==
In 1976 Niels Jacobsen proposed the change of name of C. nevillii to C. × willisii. This plant is a natural hybrid, so the name is spelt with a cross: C. × willisii.

- Crypts page C. nevillii

== Distribution ==
Sri Lanka (Kandy area)

== Description ==
The leaves and even the spathe of this plant are variable (no doubt due to its hybrid nature). The crypts page (see link below) illustrate a number of different forms which makes identification difficult. Cryptocoryne × willisi is a smaller member of the genus along with Cryptocoryne parva, and may only reach up to 5cm in size.

== Cultivation ==
Not difficult to grow and common in aquariums but some forms do not seem to flower.
