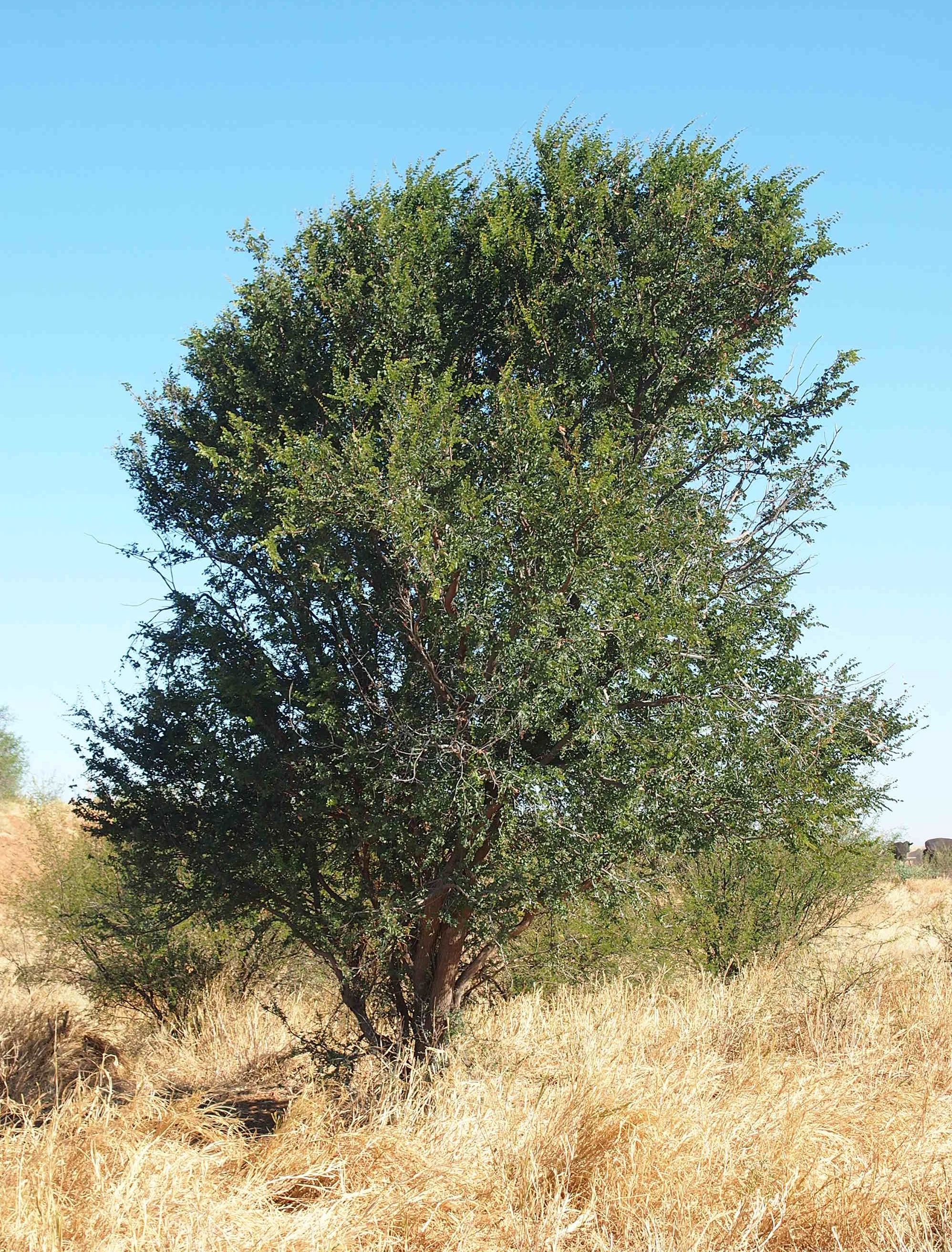

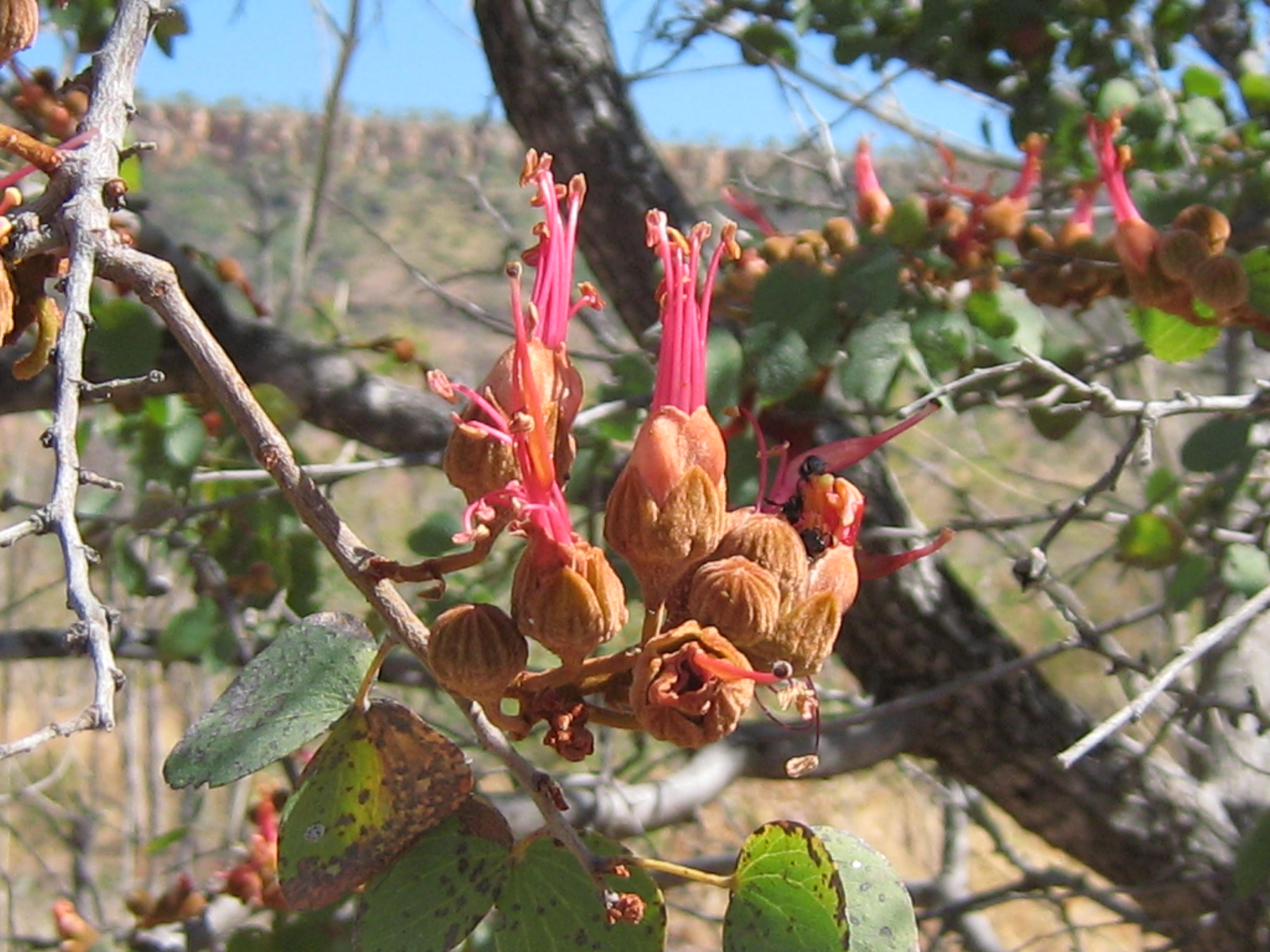

Conservation status
- Least Concern (IUCN 3.1)

Scientific classification
- Kingdom: Plantae
- Clade: Tracheophytes
- Clade: Angiosperms
- Clade: Eudicots
- Clade: Rosids
- Order: Fabales
- Family: Fabaceae
- Genus: Lysiphyllum
- Species: L. cunninghamii

Binomial name
- Lysiphyllum cunninghamii (Benth.) de Wit
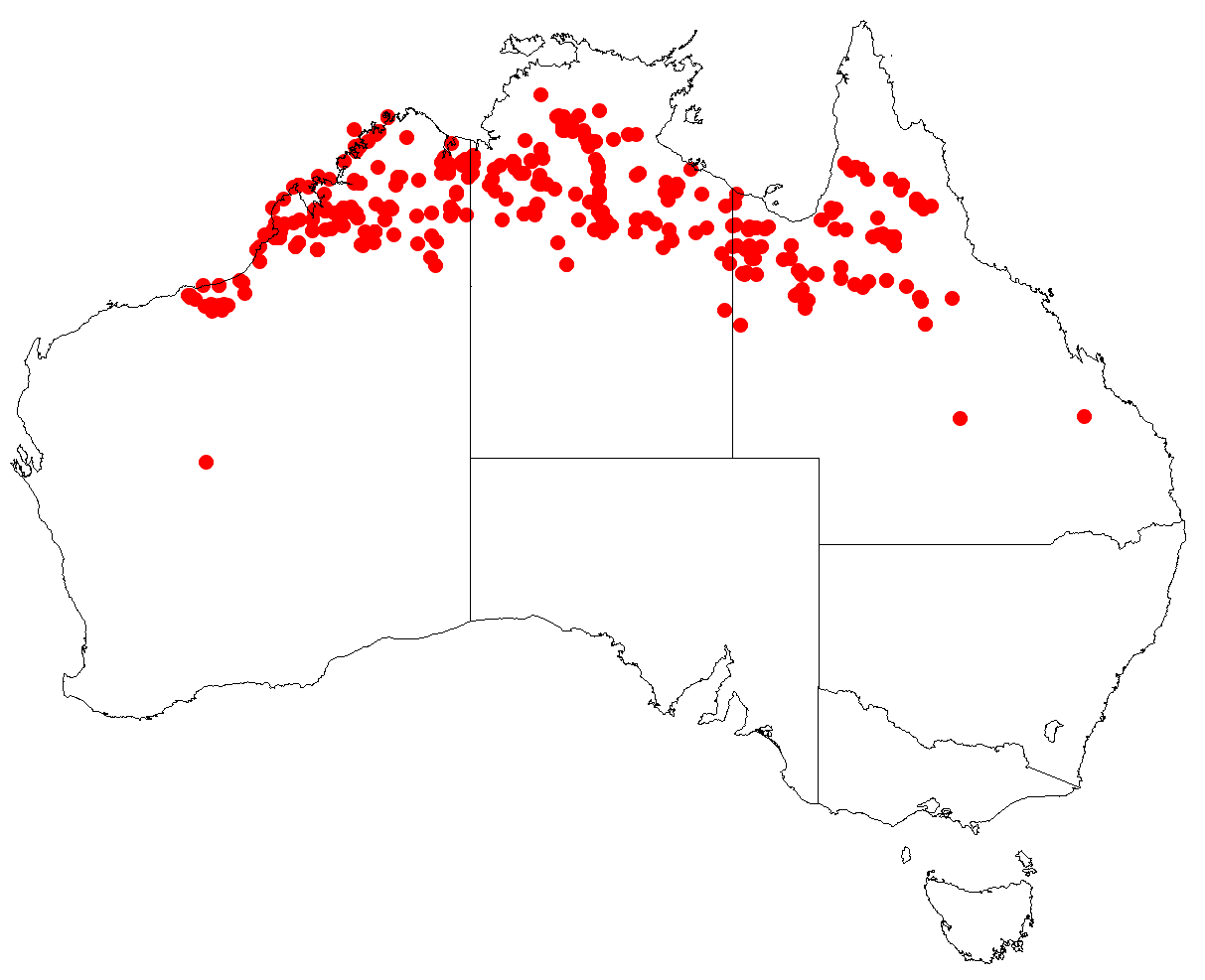
- Occurrence data from AVH

Synonyms
- Phanera cunninghamii Benth.; Bauhinia cunninghamii (Benth.) Benth.

= Lysiphyllum cunninghamii =

Species of legume

Lysiphyllum cunninghamii (commonly known as the Kimberley bauhinia or the jigal tree) is a species of plant in the family Fabaceae. It is native to northern Australia where it occurs from Western Australia through the Northern Territory to Queensland.

== Names ==
The specific epithet, cunninghamii, honours Allan Cunningham, who was the botanist on the third voyage of the Mermaid with Phillip Parker King, and who collected the type specimen of Phanera cunninghamii.

Jigal means mother-in-law and refers to the paired leaflets, which turn away from each other, as in Aboriginal customary law where mother-in-law and son-in-law may not face or interact with one another. (See Avoidance speech, and Dixon (1991) for 'mother-in-law' or 'avoidance' language style.)

=== Aboriginal language names ===
Jaminjung, Ngaliwurru, Nungali: Wanyarri (Ngal, Nung), Wayili (Jam).
Jaru: gunji.
Mangarrayi language, Yangman: Gamulumulu (Mang, Yang).
Miriwoong: Wanyarring
Ngarinyman: Wanyarri.
Wagiman: windinyin

== Description ==
It grows as a shrub or tree up to 12 m (occasionally up to 18 m) in height with grey fissured or tessellated bark. The inflorescences are axillary on old wood, with its bright red flowers being seen from April to October, followed by large, reddish-brown seed pods from November to January. The nectar produced by the flowers attracts honeyeaters and native bees. The trees drop their leaves in the dry season, but new leaves often appear just before the onset of the rainy season. The leaves have two lobes joined like butterfly wings.

== Distribution and habitat ==
It occurs on red alluvial sandy and loamy soils, often in watercourses and on levees, flood plains, pindan and the margins of monsoonal forests. It is found in the Central Kimberley, Dampierland, Gascoyne, Great Sandy Desert, Northern Kimberley, Ord Victoria Plain, Pilbara and Victoria Bonaparte, Katherine Region, IBRA bioregions.

== Taxonomy ==
Lysiphyllum cunninghamii was first described in 1852 as Phanera cunninghamii by George Bentham. The type specimen (BM000810756) was collected by Allan Cunningham in 1820 at Careening Bay in the Kimberley and is held in the British Museum. In 1864, Bentham assigned it to the genus, Bauhinia, and it became Bauhinia cunninghamii, and in 1956, Hendrik de Wit redescribed it as belonging to the genus, Lysiphyllum, making it Lysiphyllum cunninghamii.

== Uses ==
The leaves and pods are high in protein and minerals, and are used as fodder for stock. The dense, weeping habit means that wallabies and other animals use the trees to shelter from the heat of the day. Fires made from the wood are smokeless, and so the wood is often used for cooking. Windbreaks are made from the branches.

Aborigines sucked nectar from the flowers. They made a decoction from the roots and inner bark, which was used on the skin as an antiseptic, and also drunk to treat fevers and other sicknesses.

Ash from the tree is mixed with chewing tobacco, and chewed. A further use is to mix the sap with nectar to make a chewy gum that has been likened to the confection Turkish delight.
