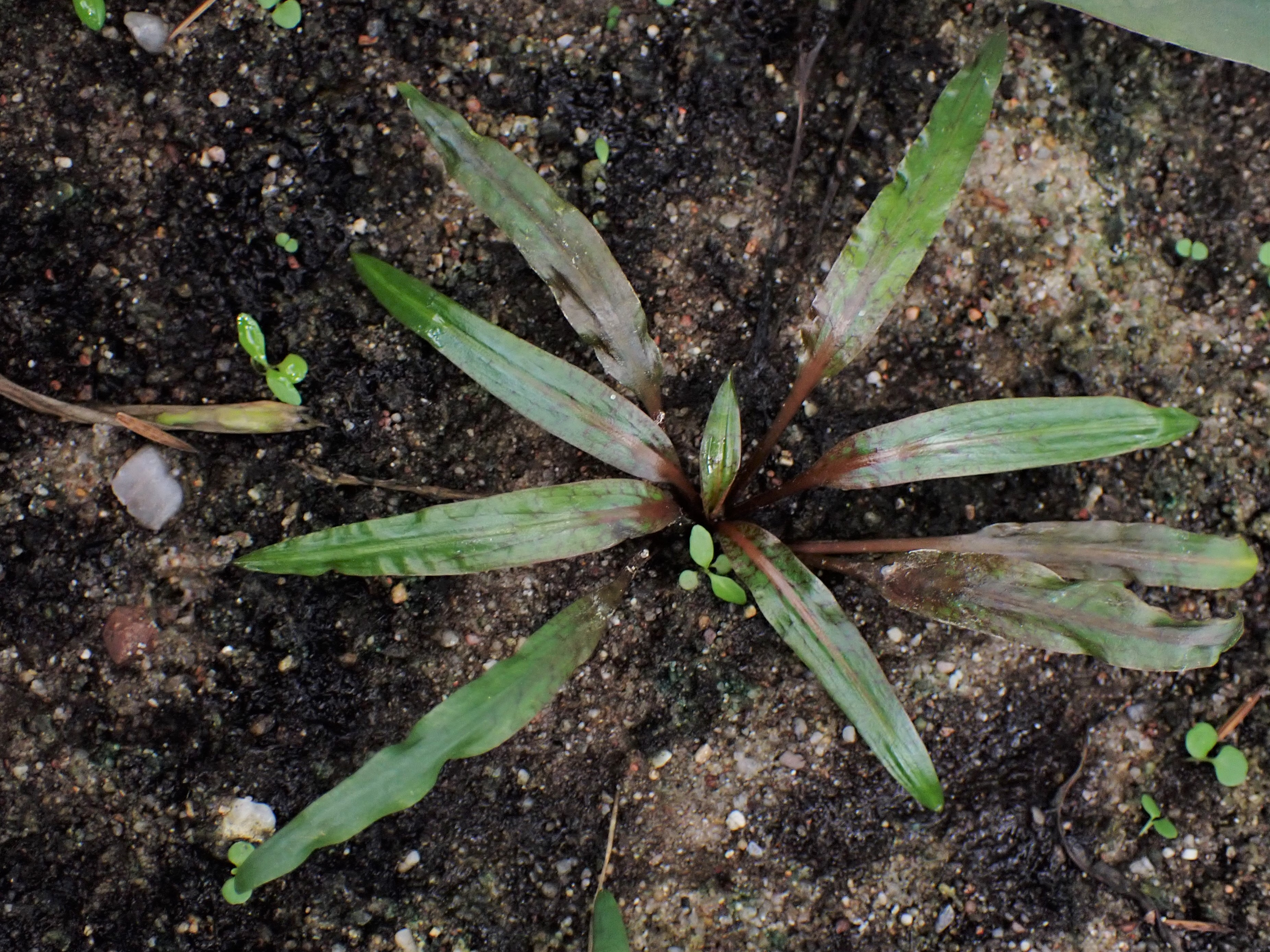

Conservation status
- Least Concern (IUCN 3.1)

Scientific classification
- Kingdom: Plantae
- Clade: Tracheophytes
- Clade: Angiosperms
- Clade: Monocots
- Order: Alismatales
- Family: Araceae
- Genus: Cryptocoryne
- Species: C. albida

Binomial name
- Cryptocoryne albida R.Parker

= Cryptocoryne albida =

Species of plant

Cryptocoryne albida is a plant species described by Richard Neville Parker. Cryptocoryne albida is part of the genus Cryptocoryne and the family Araceae. The IUCN categorizes the species globally as least concern. No subspecies are listed.
