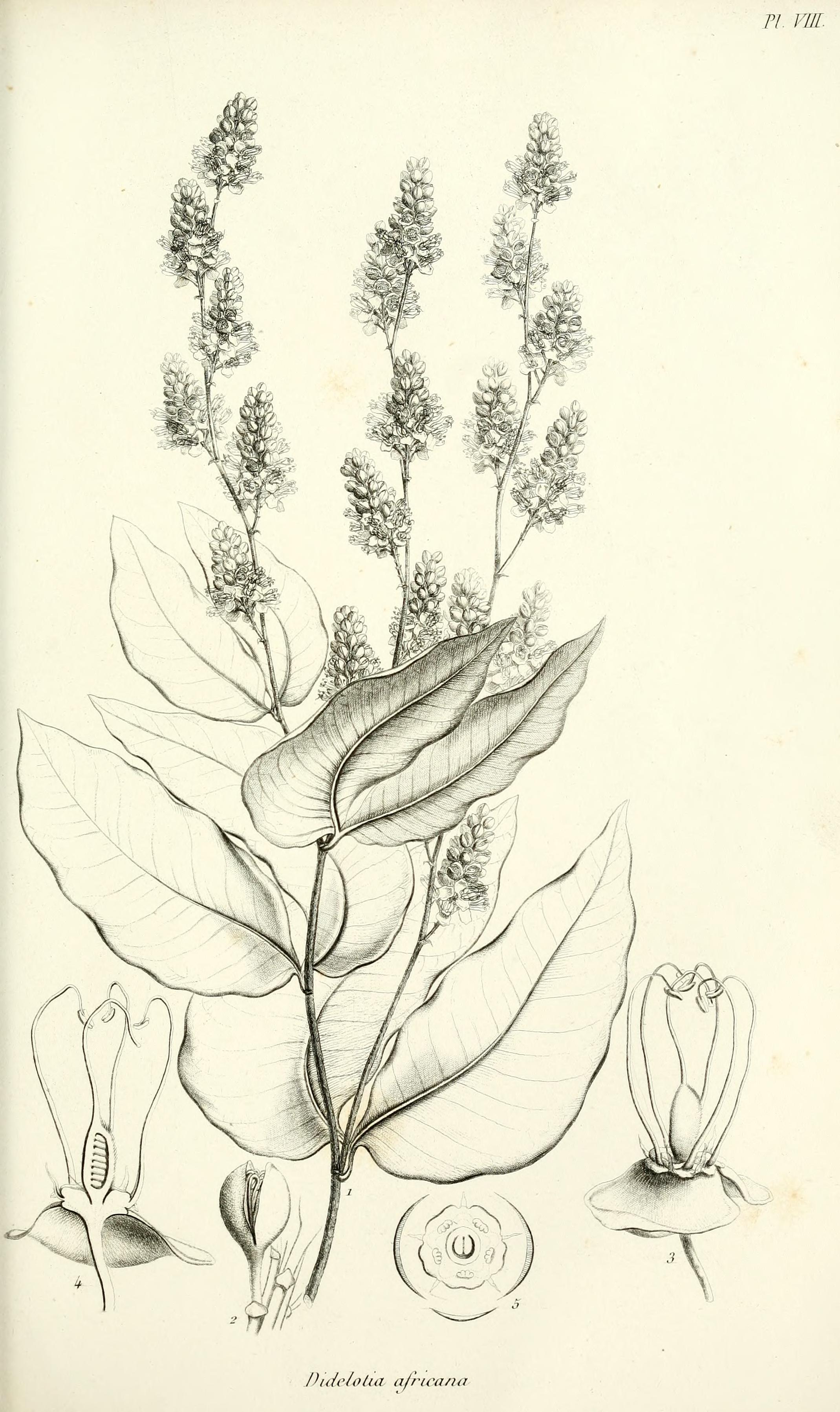
- Didelotia africana

Scientific classification
- Kingdom: Plantae
- Clade: Tracheophytes
- Clade: Angiosperms
- Clade: Eudicots
- Clade: Rosids
- Order: Fabales
- Family: Fabaceae
- Subfamily: Detarioideae
- Tribe: Amherstieae
- Genus: Didelotia; Baill. (1865)

Species
- 13; see text

Synonyms
- Toubaouate Aubrév. & Pellegr. (1958); Zingania A.Chev. (1946)

= Didelotia =

Genus of legumes

Didelotia is a genus of flowering plants in the family Fabaceae. It includes 13 species native to western and west-central tropical Africa, ranging from Sierra Leone to the Democratic Republic of the Congo.

13 species are accepted:

- Didelotia africana Baill.
- Didelotia afzelii Taub.
- Didelotia brevipaniculata J.Léonard
- Didelotia engleri Dinkl. & Harms
- Didelotia gracillima Jongkind
- Didelotia idae J.Léonard, Oldeman & de Wit
- Didelotia korupensis Burgt
- Didelotia ledermannii Harms
- Didelotia letouzeyi Pellegr.
- Didelotia minutiflora (A.Chev.) J.Léonard
- Didelotia morelii Aubrév.
- Didelotia pauli-sitai Letouzey
- Didelotia unifoliolata J.Léonard
