= Cryptocoryne usteriana =

Usteri's water trumpet

Conservation status
- Near Threatened (IUCN 2.3)

Scientific classification
- Kingdom: Plantae
- Clade: Tracheophytes
- Clade: Angiosperms
- Clade: Monocots
- Order: Alismatales
- Family: Araceae
- Genus: Cryptocoryne
- Species: C. usteriana

Binomial name
- Cryptocoryne usteriana Engl. (1905)

Species of aquatic plant

Cryptocoryne usteriana is a species of aquatic herb in the family Araceae endemic to the Philippines. It was named after the German botanist Alfred Usteri who discovered the plant in the island-province of Guimaras in 1902. The species can also be found in the mainland Panay, in tributaries of lowland bedrock river with not too rapidly flowing water and seasonal flood pools. During the summer, its natural habitat dries up and plants undergo complete meltdown. The following monsoon rain and inundation triggers the remaining rootstock or rhizome to regrow quickly and send blooms underwater. Due to overcollection for the aquarium trade, the local government categorized it as threatened species.
