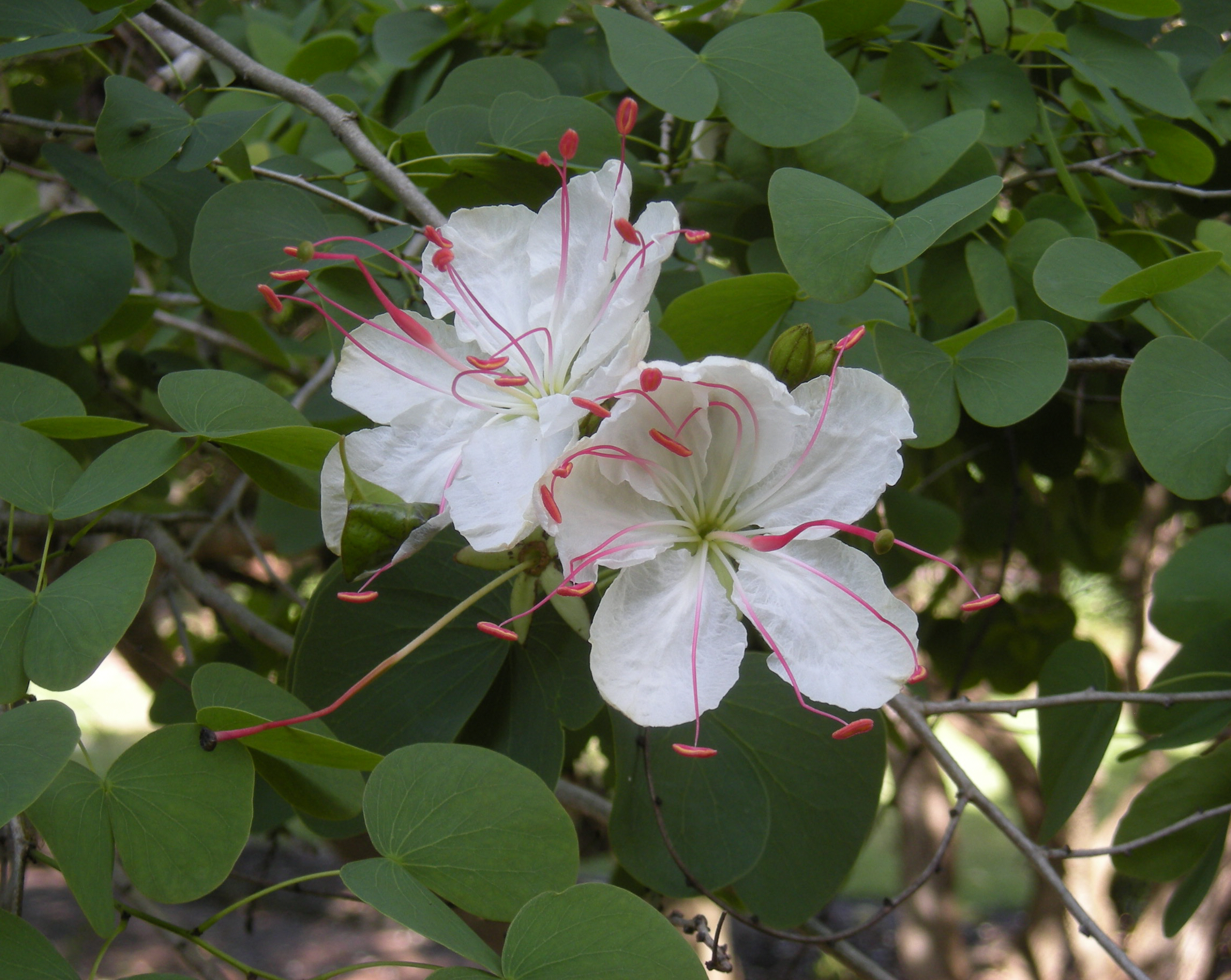
- Lysiphyllum hookeri

Scientific classification
- Kingdom: Plantae
- Clade: Tracheophytes
- Clade: Angiosperms
- Clade: Eudicots
- Clade: Rosids
- Order: Fabales
- Family: Fabaceae
- Tribe: Bauhinieae
- Genus: Lysiphyllum (Benth.) de Wit

Type species
- Lysiphyllum cunninghamii (Benth.) de Wit (1956)

Species
- 9; see text

= Lysiphyllum =

Genus of legumes

Lysiphyllum is a genus of flowering plants in the legume family, Fabaceae. It includes nine species of trees, semi-scandent shrubs, and lianas which range from India through Southeast Asia to Australasia. Typical habitats include seasonally-dry tropical forest and woodland, vine thickets, Brigalow and Gidgee scrubland, floodplains, alluvial flats, tidal forest, mangroves, river and stream banks, and occasionally dunes and coral islets. They can grow on diverse soils including calcareous, granitic, and basaltic.

The genus belongs to subfamily Cercidoideae and tribe Bauhinieae. It belongs to the subfamily Cercidoideae. It was formerly treated as part of the genus Bauhinia, but recent molecular phylogenetic analysis confirms that Lysiphyllum is a distinct genus from Bauhinia.

== Species ==
Lysiphyllum comprises the following species:

- Lysiphyllum binatum (Blanco) de Wit
- Lysiphyllum carronii (F. Muell.) Pedley—northern beantree, red bauhinia
- Lysiphyllum cunninghamii (Benth.) de Wit
- Lysiphyllum dewitii (K. Larsen & S. S. Larsen) Bandyop. & Ghoshal
- Lysiphyllum diphyllum (Buch.-Ham.) de Wit
- Lysiphyllum gilvum (Bailey) Pedley
- Lysiphyllum hookeri (F. Muell.) Pedley—white bauhinia, pegunny, mountain ebony, Queensland ebony, Hooker's bauhinia
- Lysiphyllum strychnifolium (W. G. Craib) A. Schmitz
- Lysiphyllum winitii (Craib) de Wit
