= Aqua Planta =

German magazine on aquatic plants

- Editor: Reinhard Boeck
- Former editors: Christel Kasselmann, Kaspar Horst
- Categories: Aquatic plants
- Frequency: Quarterly
- Publisher: Arbeitskreis Wasserpflanzen
- Founded: 1976
- Country: Germany
- Based in: Frankfurt
- Language: German
- Website: arbeitskreis-wasserpflanzen.de?aqua_planta
- ISSN: 0176-2273

Aqua Planta is a German magazine covering aquatic plants and plants cultivated in aquariums. It is the official magazine of the "Arbeitskreis Wasserpflanzen" (Workgroup Waterplants) of the "Verband Deutscher Vereine für Aquarien- und Terrarienkunde". The magazine is published quarterly. Although it is written mostly for and by aquarium plant enthusiasts, professional botanists have occasionally used it to publish their results, including occasional descriptions of newly discovered species (for example, Lagenandra dewitii). The journal is published in German, with occasional English summaries.

Christel Kasselmann and Gerd Eggers are among the former editors-in-chief of the magazine.
