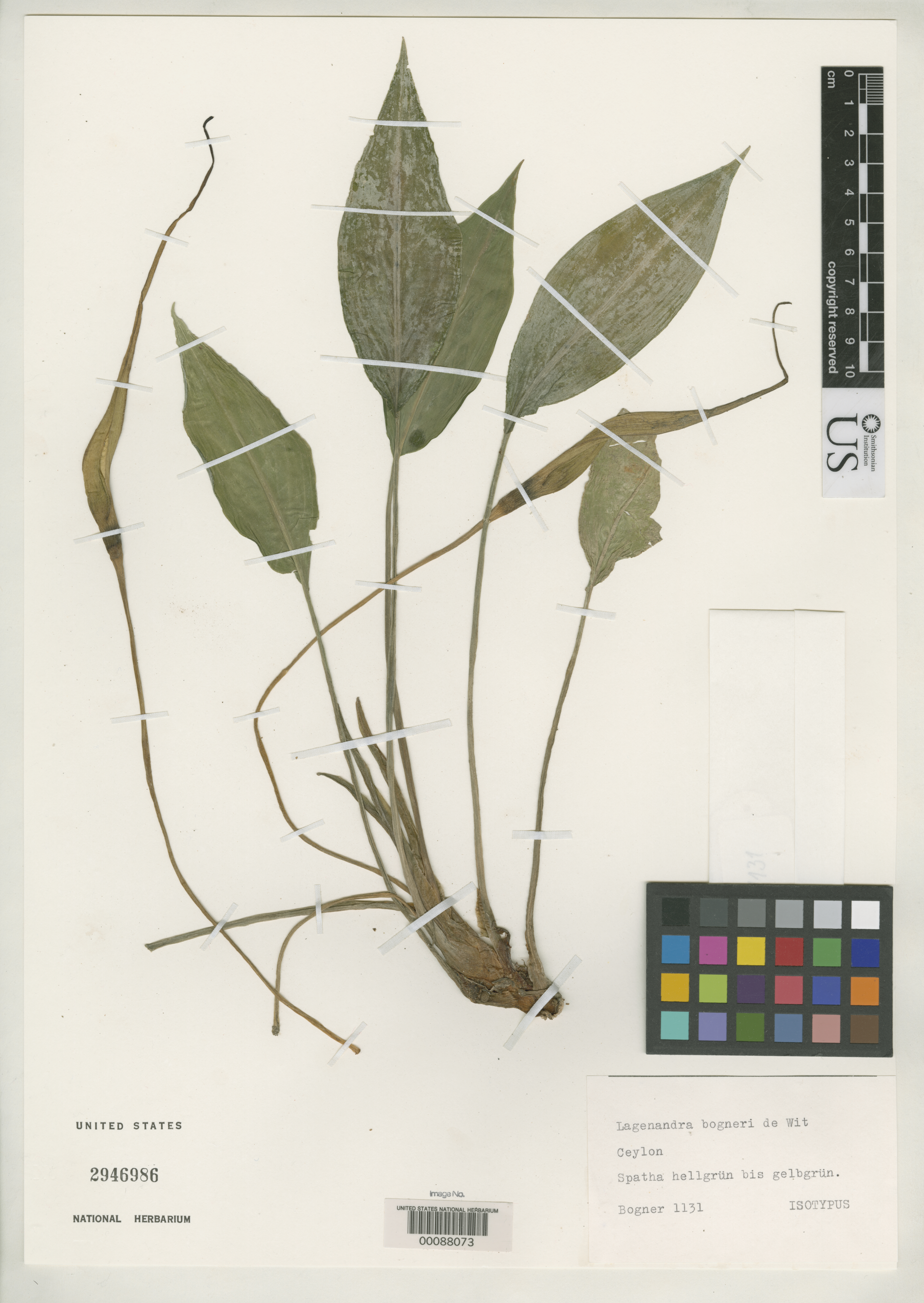

Scientific classification
- Kingdom: Plantae
- Clade: Tracheophytes
- Clade: Angiosperms
- Clade: Monocots
- Order: Alismatales
- Family: Araceae
- Genus: Lagenandra
- Species: L. bogneri

Binomial name
- Lagenandra bogneri de Wit

= Lagenandra bogneri =

Species of flowering plant

Lagenandra bogneri belongs to the genus Lagenandra in the family Araceae that is endemic to south western Sri Lanka.
