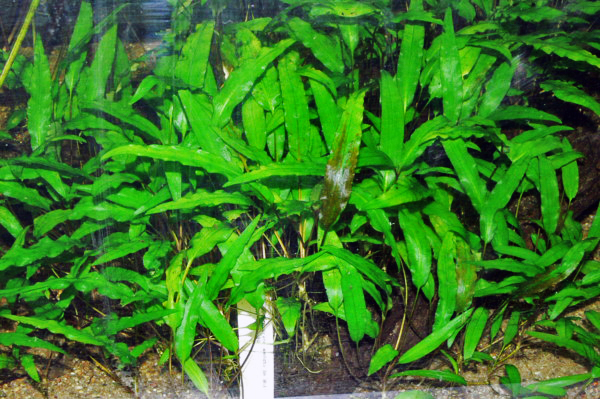
- Cryptocoryne wendtii

Scientific classification
- Kingdom: Plantae
- Clade: Tracheophytes
- Clade: Angiosperms
- Clade: Monocots
- Order: Alismatales
- Family: Araceae
- Subfamily: Aroideae
- Tribe: Cryptocoryneae; Blume

= Cryptocoryneae =

Tribe of aquatic plants

The Cryptocoryneae are a small Aroid tribe consisting of the closely related genera Cryptocoryne Fisch. ex Wyd. and Lagenandra Dalzell.
