= Cryptocoryne affinis =

Scientific classification
- Kingdom: Plantae
- Clade: Tracheophytes
- Clade: Angiosperms
- Clade: Monocots
- Order: Alismatales
- Family: Araceae
- Genus: Cryptocoryne
- Species: C. affinis

Binomial name
- Cryptocoryne affinis N.E.Br.

Synonyms
- Cryptocoryne haerteliana Jacobsen ex Millkuhn.

Species of aquatic plant

Cryptocoryne affinis is a plant species belonging to the Araceae genus Cryptocoryne.

== Distribution ==
SW Malay Peninsula (Pahang), sometimes occurs in part of Perak state.

== Description ==
Long lanceolate leaves 6–12 inches (15–30 cm) long with an attractive bluish-green upper surface, a light green midrib and side nerves. The underside of the leaves is a deep reddish purple. The leaf stems are short in proportion to the leaf blade.

Several forms are sold in the aquarium trade differing in colour and serration of the leaf edge. Variable dependent on how it is grown and light levels. Leaves dark green above and purple to violet beneath.

Flowers may be produced even when grown completely submersed. The inflorescence reaches about 10 inches (25 cm) with the spathe elongated into a purple-red, spirally-coiled blade.

== Cultivation ==
Considered easy to cultivate. Reluctant to flower even in emersed culture. The leaves are darker in shady conditions and it will grow in moderate light in the aquarium. Doesn't seem to be fussy as to water conditions and is fine in normal tropical aquarium temperatures : 72–79F (22–26C). One of the hardiest of all the Cryptocoryne's in cultivation. Subject to 'Crypt melt' (see genus page). Sensitive to calcium and hard water.

Propagates well by runners.

Introduced to Europe by Herman Haertel, a German importer.
