= Cryptocoryne aponogetifolia =

Scientific classification
- Kingdom: Plantae
- Clade: Tracheophytes
- Clade: Angiosperms
- Clade: Monocots
- Order: Alismatales
- Family: Araceae
- Genus: Cryptocoryne
- Species: C. aponogetifolia

Binomial name
- Cryptocoryne aponogetifolia Merr.

Species of aquatic plant

Cryptocoryne aponogetifolia is a species belonging to the Araceae genus Cryptocoryne.

== Confusion ==
Until recently there was confusion between this species and C. usteriana.

== Distribution ==
The species is found in the Philippines, on the islands Negros and Panay and the south-east of Luzon.

== Description ==
Cryptocoryne aponogetifolia is the largest of the Cryptocorynes, with long strap-like leaves up to 46 cm or more long and 5 cm wide with a broad mid-rib. The stalks are normally about half the length of the leaves. In colour they are a bright green and the surface is pronounced bullate. The inflorescence can reach up to 50 cm and often has a strongly twisted tube.

== Cultivation ==
Cryptocoryne aponogetifolia is considered easy to cultivate and will grow in moderately hard water if necessary, though it grows naturally in slightly soft water. It prefers moderate to low levels of light. Plants will take some months to get established in the aquarium but will then send out strong runners.
