= Cryptocoryne dewitii =

Scientific classification
- Kingdom: Plantae
- Clade: Tracheophytes
- Clade: Angiosperms
- Clade: Monocots
- Order: Alismatales
- Family: Araceae
- Genus: Cryptocoryne
- Species: C. dewitii

Binomial name
- Cryptocoryne dewitii N. Jacobsen

Species of aquatic plant

Cryptocoryne dewitii is a plant species belonging to the Araceae genus Cryptocoryne. It was first described in 1977 from dried herbarium material and named in honor of the Dutch botanist Hendrik de Wit.

== Distribution ==
- Papua New Guinea
