= Cryptocoryne alba =

Scientific classification
- Kingdom: Plantae
- Clade: Tracheophytes
- Clade: Angiosperms
- Clade: Monocots
- Order: Alismatales
- Family: Araceae
- Genus: Cryptocoryne
- Species: C. alba

Binomial name
- Cryptocoryne alba de Wit

Species of plant

Cryptocoryne alba is a flowering plant belonging to the genus Cryptocoryne in the family Araceae.

== Habitat ==
C. alba is found southwest of Sri Lanka where it is under threat. It grows in deep leaf litter in its natural habitat.

== Description ==
Its leaf and spathe are umber in color.
