= Cryptocoryne undulata =

Scientific classification
- Kingdom: Plantae
- Clade: Tracheophytes
- Clade: Angiosperms
- Clade: Monocots
- Order: Alismatales
- Family: Araceae
- Genus: Cryptocoryne
- Species: C. undulata

Binomial name
- Cryptocoryne undulata Wendt (1955)

Synonyms
- Cryptocoryne willisii Engler ex Baum; Cryptocoryne axelrodii ?

Species of aquatic plant

Cryptocoryne undulata, also known as undulate cryptocoryne, is a plant species belonging to the Araceae genus Cryptocoryne.

== Taxonomy ==
In the literature of the 60's this plant was considered a form of C. willisii but see the Cryptocoryne page for a discussion of the name change and the 'diploid and 'triploid' forms.

== Distribution ==
It is found in Sri Lanka and Thailand.

== Description ==
Its long, ruffled dark green leaves may grow to more than 14 inches (35 cm) when mature. It is variable in form under different conditions and origin; low light levels may produce light green leaves.

== Cultivation ==
Considered one of the easier cryptocorynes to grow in an aquarium, it will grow well partially and fully submersed and flowers relatively easily. It prefers bright light and a temperature range of 72-82 degrees F (22-28 degrees C). The 'diploid' form forms runners. Common in the aquarium trade.
