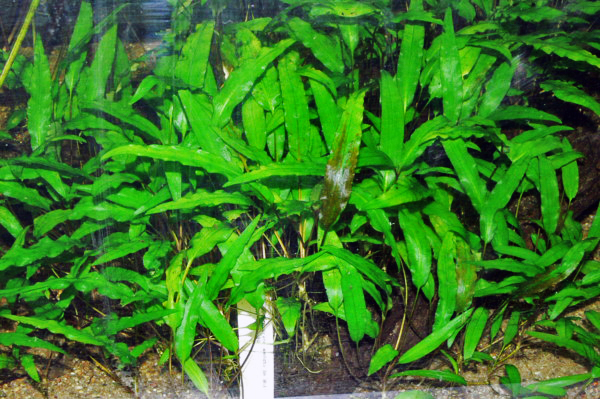

Scientific classification
- Kingdom: Plantae
- Clade: Tracheophytes
- Clade: Angiosperms
- Clade: Monocots
- Order: Alismatales
- Family: Araceae
- Genus: Cryptocoryne
- Species: C. wendtii

Binomial name
- Cryptocoryne wendtii de Wit

Synonyms
- Cryptocoryne wendtii var. jahnelii Rataj; Cryptocoryne wendtii var. krauteri Rataj; Cryptocoryne wendtii var. nana Rataj; Cryptocoryne wendtii var. rubella Rataj

= Cryptocoryne wendtii =

Species of aquatic plant

Cryptocoryne wendtii, the Wendt's water trumpet, is a species of herbaceous plant and popular aquarium plant which is native to Sri Lanka. It was described by Dutch botanist Hendrik de Wit in honour of aquarium hobbyist and writer Albert Wendt.

== Distribution ==
It is native to Sri Lanka and has been introduced into Florida.

== Description ==
A very variable species and numerous 'forms' of variable taxonomic status have been discussed, for example "Tropica". The "Mi Oya" form is named after the river it is found in Sri Lanka.

== Cultivation ==
An easy plant to grow and one of the most robust Cryptocoryne species, it is common and widely found in the aquarium trade. It is variable under different light and other environmental conditions. It is propagated by runners.

== Sources ==
- Dötsch, A. 1984. Cryptocoryne wendtii de Wit (Pflanzenportrait). Aqua-Planta 3-84 : 17-18.
- Jacobsen, N. 1987. Cryptocoryne. A Revised Handbook to the Flora of Ceylon, Vol. VI: 85-99.
- Möhlmann, F. 1985. Reich an Varianten ist Cryptocoryne wendtii De Wit. Das Aquarium 198 : 629-633.
- Möhlmann, F. 1994. Die Cryptocoryne-Arten Ceylons (2). Aqua-Planta 1-94 : 34-39.
- Rataj, K. 1975. Revision of the genus Cryptocoryne Fischer Studie CSAV, c.3.Praha.
- Wit, H.C.D.de 1958. Cryptocoryne wendtii sp.nov. Meded.Bot.tuinen en het Belmonte arboretum WAG Vol.II-4 : 97-101.
- Wit, H.C.D.de 1990. Aquarienpflanzen, 2. Auflage Ulmer, Stuttgart.
