= Cryptocoryne auriculata =

Scientific classification
- Kingdom: Plantae
- Clade: Tracheophytes
- Clade: Angiosperms
- Clade: Monocots
- Order: Alismatales
- Family: Araceae
- Genus: Cryptocoryne
- Species: C. auriculata

Binomial name
- Cryptocoryne auriculata Engl.

Species of plant

Cryptocoryne auriculata is a plant species belonging to the Araceae genus Cryptocoryne.

== Distribution ==
Borneo (Sarawak) and Philippines ?

In nature, C. auriculata grows between stones, which indicates that the water is running fast in the rainy season.

== Description ==
Small ovate leaves up to 2.5 inches (6.5 cm) and 1.5 inches broad (4 cm) with a sharp tip and cordate base, on stems of equal length to the leaves. Rather thick and stiff in texture. In colour the leaves are a dark olive-green. Has a short spathe, involving a small white collar and purple/red opening

== Cultivation ==
Considered difficult in cultivation. Only occasionally imported and often seems to just fade away. Will grow emerse and submerse and is reputed to withstand hard water. Needs an aquarium with clean water and a good substrate.

Propagates well by runners.
