= Cryptocoryne parva =

Scientific classification
- Kingdom: Plantae
- Clade: Tracheophytes
- Clade: Angiosperms
- Clade: Monocots
- Order: Alismatales
- Family: Araceae
- Genus: Cryptocoryne
- Species: C. parva

Binomial name
- Cryptocoryne parva de Wit

Species of aquatic freshwater plant

Cryptocoryne parva is an aquatic freshwater plant, often grown in aquariums. It is the smallest known member of the genus Cryptocoryne. Native to Sri Lanka, it grows as a small rosette reaching between 5 and 8 cm. Emersed leaves are a little wider than those growing under water. The spathe is c. 1.5 cm.

It grows very slowly even under good conditions and prefers a lot of light.
