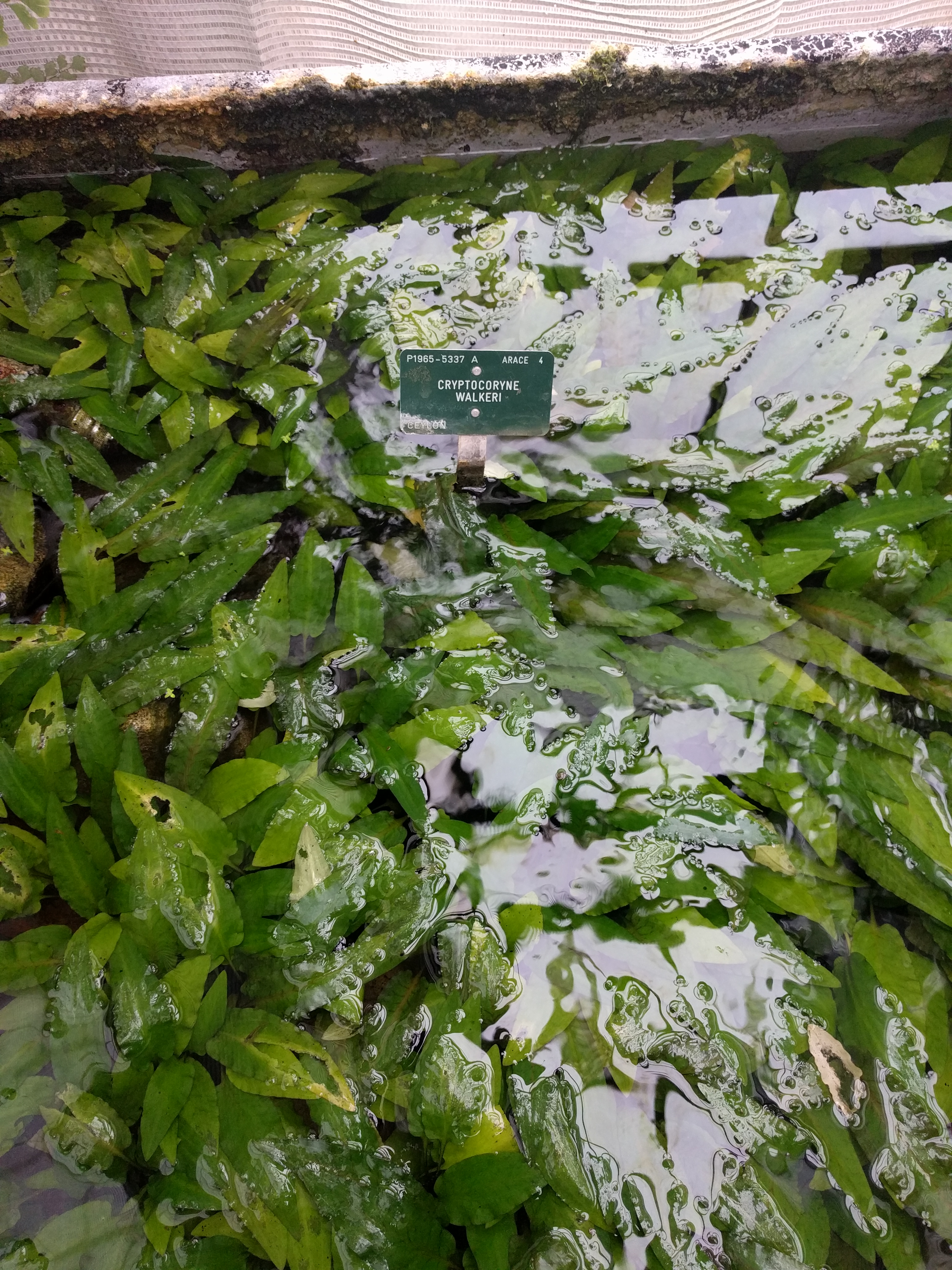

Scientific classification
- Kingdom: Plantae
- Clade: Tracheophytes
- Clade: Angiosperms
- Clade: Monocots
- Order: Alismatales
- Family: Araceae
- Genus: Cryptocoryne
- Species: C. walkeri

Binomial name
- Cryptocoryne walkeri Schott

Synonyms
- Cryptocoryne lutea

= Cryptocoryne walkeri =

Species of aquatic plant

Cryptocoryne walkeri is a plant species belonging to the aroid genus Cryptocoryne. It is known to occur only in Sri Lanka.

== Description ==
Cryptocoryne walkeri has a more rigid and upright structure than most other Cryptocorynes. It grows to be 12–15 cm with a width of 8 cm.

== Cultivation ==
Cryptocoryne walkeri is considered to be of medium-difficulty to cultivate. It is a slow grower with medium demands as to nutrients and light. Prefers medium lighting along with a pH of 5.0-7.0. Grows well in water that is 20-28C. As with all other Cryptocoryne cultivars, C. walkeri is subject to crypt melt.
