= Didelotia unifoliolata =

Conservation status
- Near Threatened (IUCN 2.3)

Scientific classification
- Kingdom: Plantae
- Clade: Tracheophytes
- Clade: Angiosperms
- Clade: Eudicots
- Clade: Rosids
- Order: Fabales
- Family: Fabaceae
- Genus: Didelotia
- Species: D. unifoliolata

Binomial name
- Didelotia unifoliolata Leonard

Species of legume

Didelotia unifoliolata is a species of plant in the family Fabaceae. It is found in Cameroon, Democratic Republic of the Congo, Gabon, Ghana, possibly Ivory Coast, possibly Liberia, and possibly Sierra Leone. It is threatened by habitat loss.
