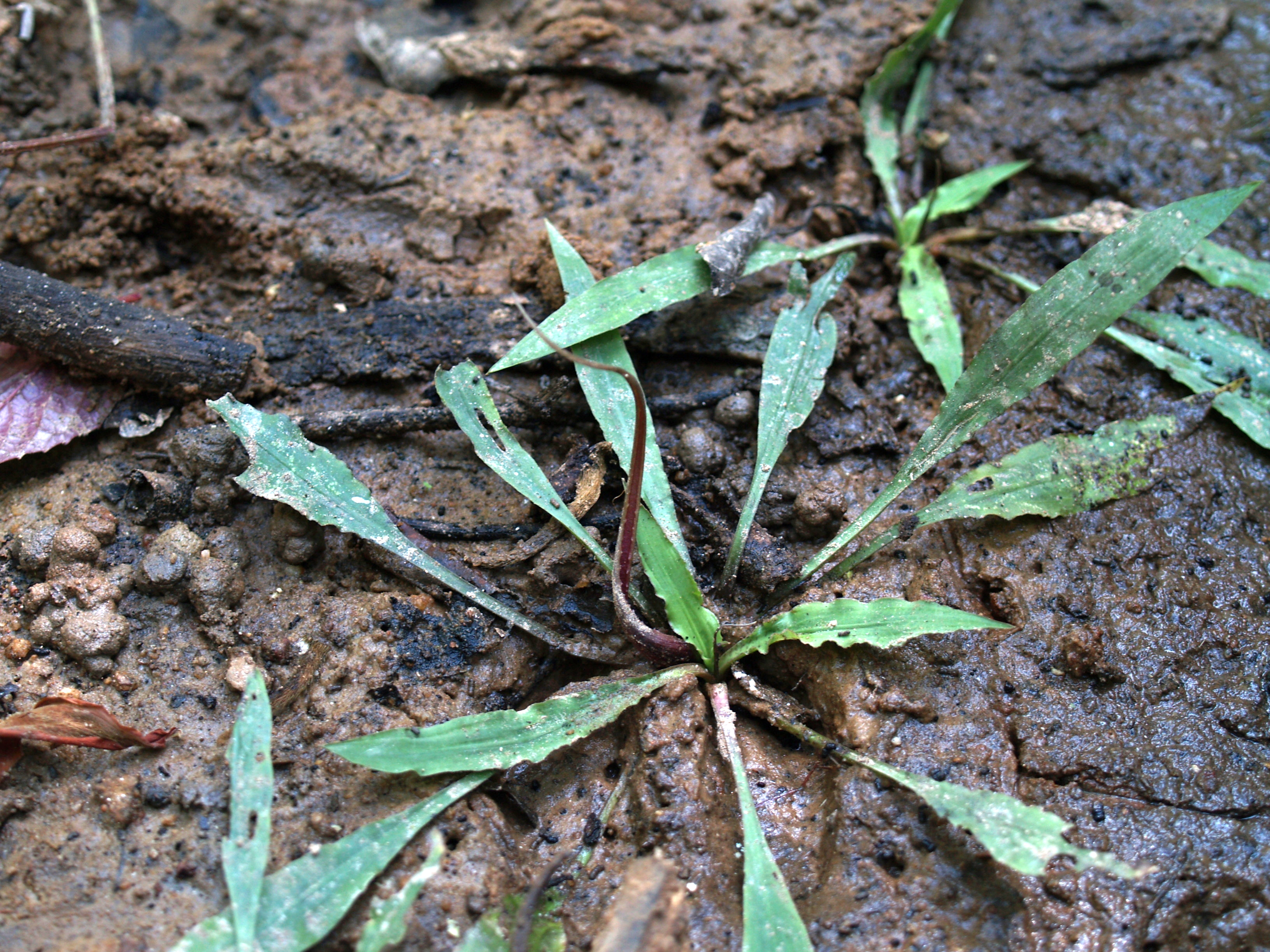

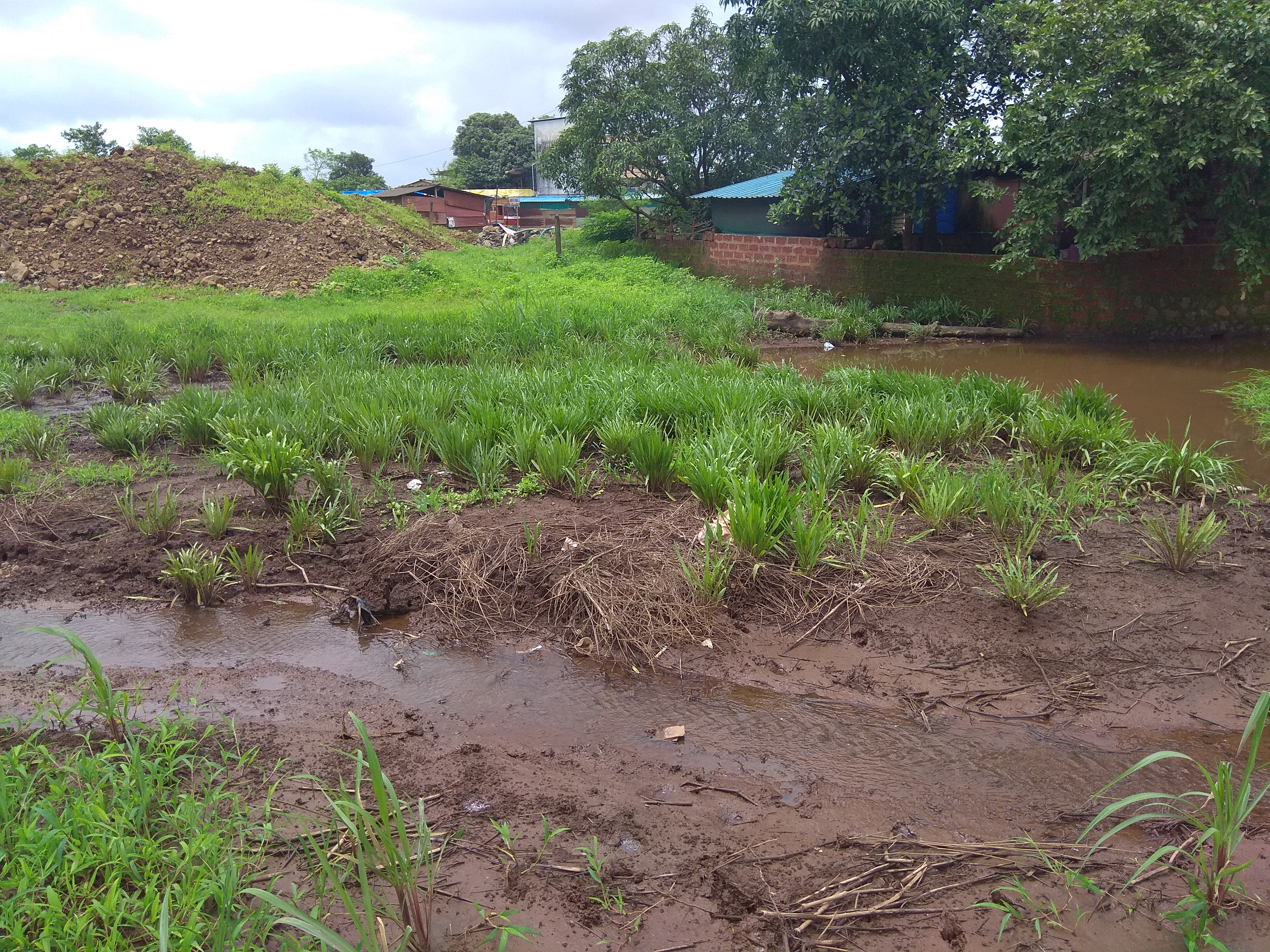

Scientific classification
- Kingdom: Plantae
- Clade: Tracheophytes
- Clade: Angiosperms
- Clade: Monocots
- Order: Alismatales
- Family: Araceae
- Genus: Cryptocoryne
- Species: C. spiralis

Binomial name
- Cryptocoryne spiralis (Retz.) Fisch. ex Wydler (1830)

= Cryptocoryne spiralis =

Species of aquatic plant

Cryptocoryne spiralis is a plant species belonging to the Araceae genus Cryptocoryne.

== Distribution ==
Endemic to India.

== Leaf morphology ==
Leaves are lanceolate and extremely variable, some variations are red stems, furrows in leaf margins, pure green forms.

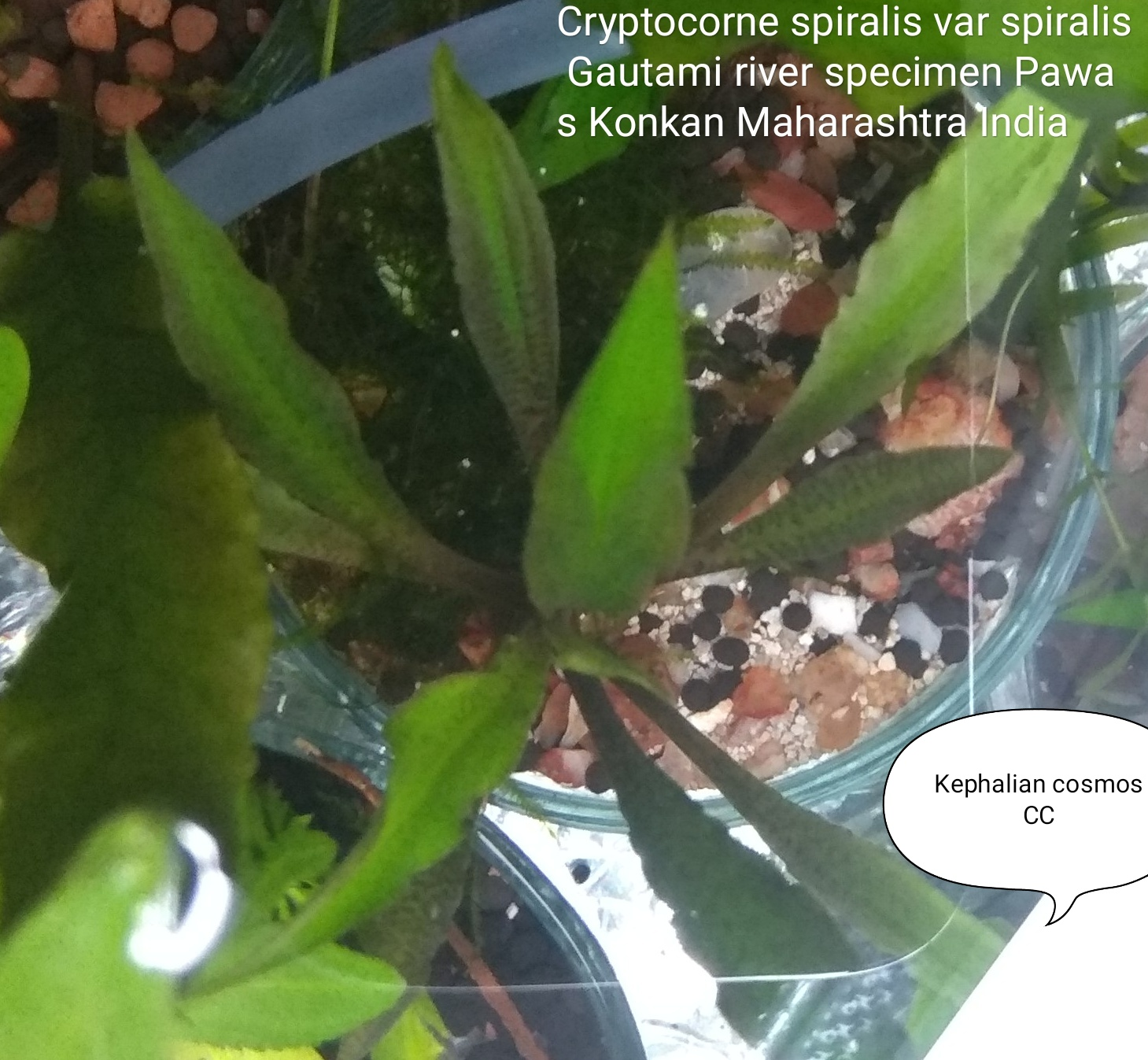
Cryotocorne spiralis var. sprialis growing submerged; this variety has red stems and furrowed leaves

== Inflorescence ==
The flower of C. spiralis is within a spathe which is curled clockwise, a distinctive feature of this species.

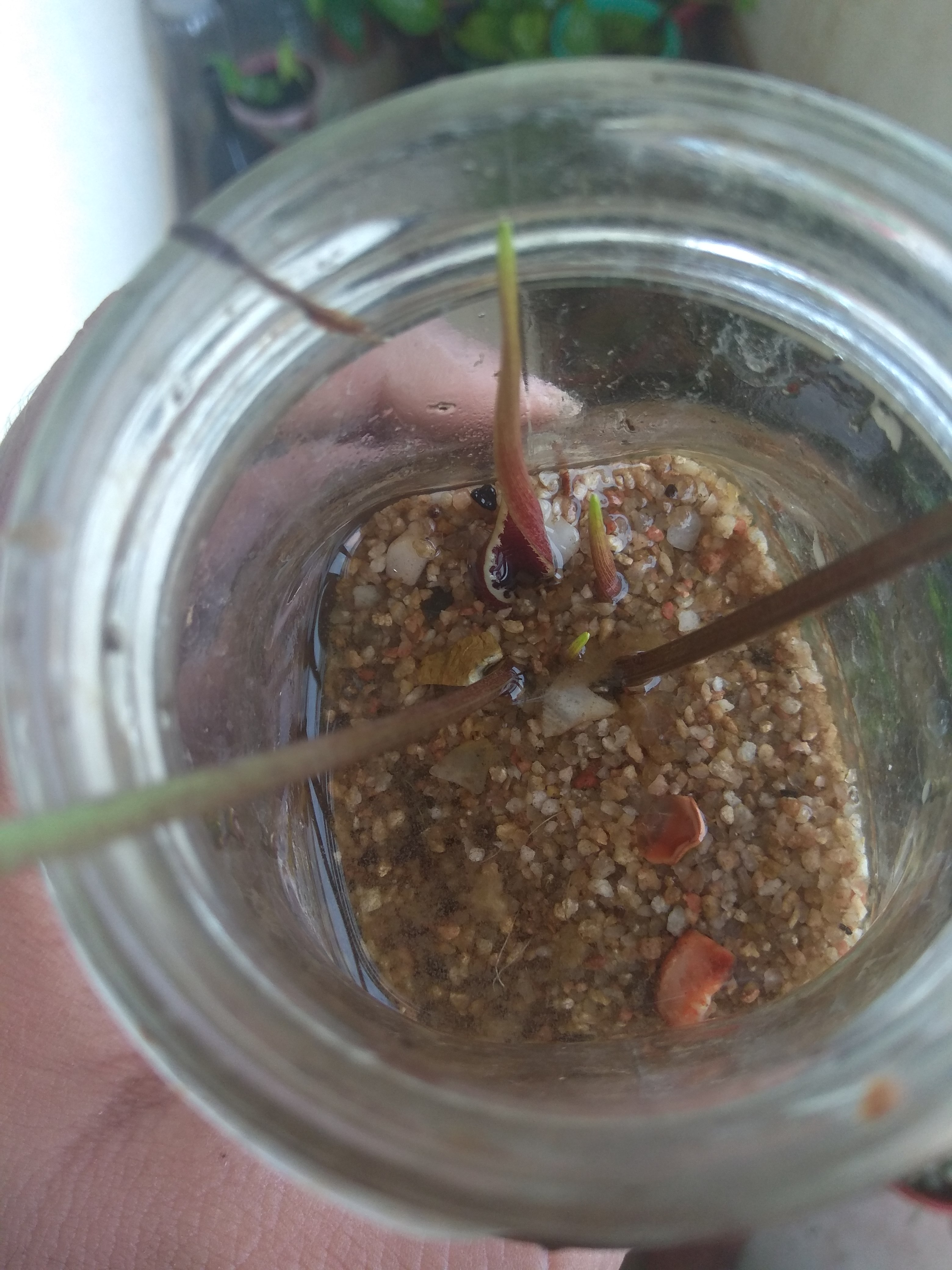
Spathe of C. spiralis var. sprialis

== Rhizome ==
Cryotocorne sprialis stores nutrients in underground rhizome, during the dry season when the marshes dry out, plant survives by losing all its leaves and becoming dormant. Next season when the rains come the rhizome sprouts new leaves.

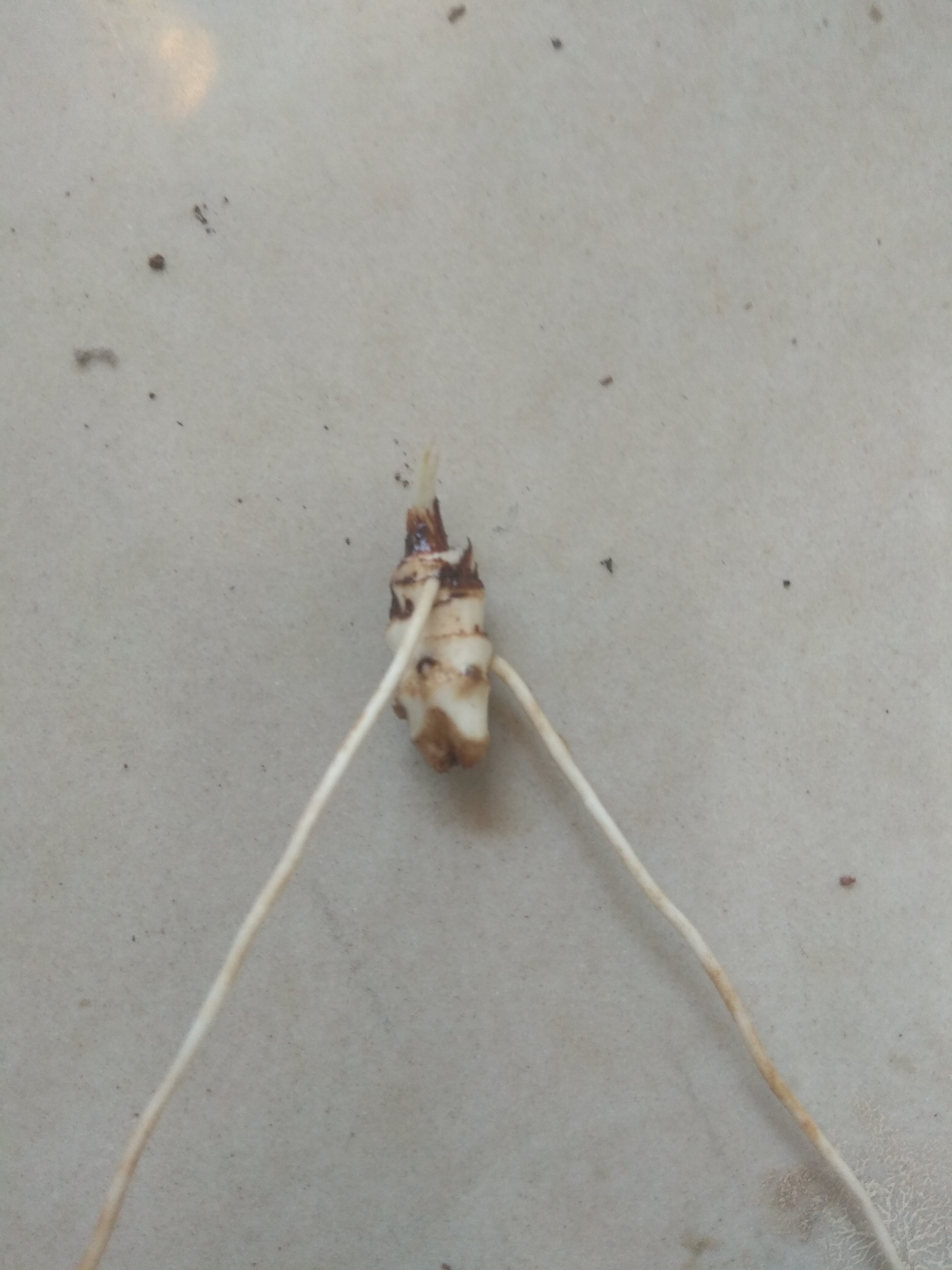
Rhizome of C. sprialis
