= Cryptocoryne cruddasiana =

Scientific classification
- Kingdom: Plantae
- Clade: Tracheophytes
- Clade: Angiosperms
- Clade: Monocots
- Order: Alismatales
- Family: Araceae
- Genus: Cryptocoryne
- Species: C. cruddasiana

Binomial name
- Cryptocoryne cruddasiana Prain (1900)

Species of aquatic plant

Cryptocoryne cruddasiana is a plant species belonging to the Araceae genus Cryptocoryne.

== Distribution ==
Endemic to northern Myanmar.

== Description ==
Cryptocoryne cruddasiana is a perennial, rhizomatous, herb that can grow as an emergent (with flowers) or as a submerged aquatic.
