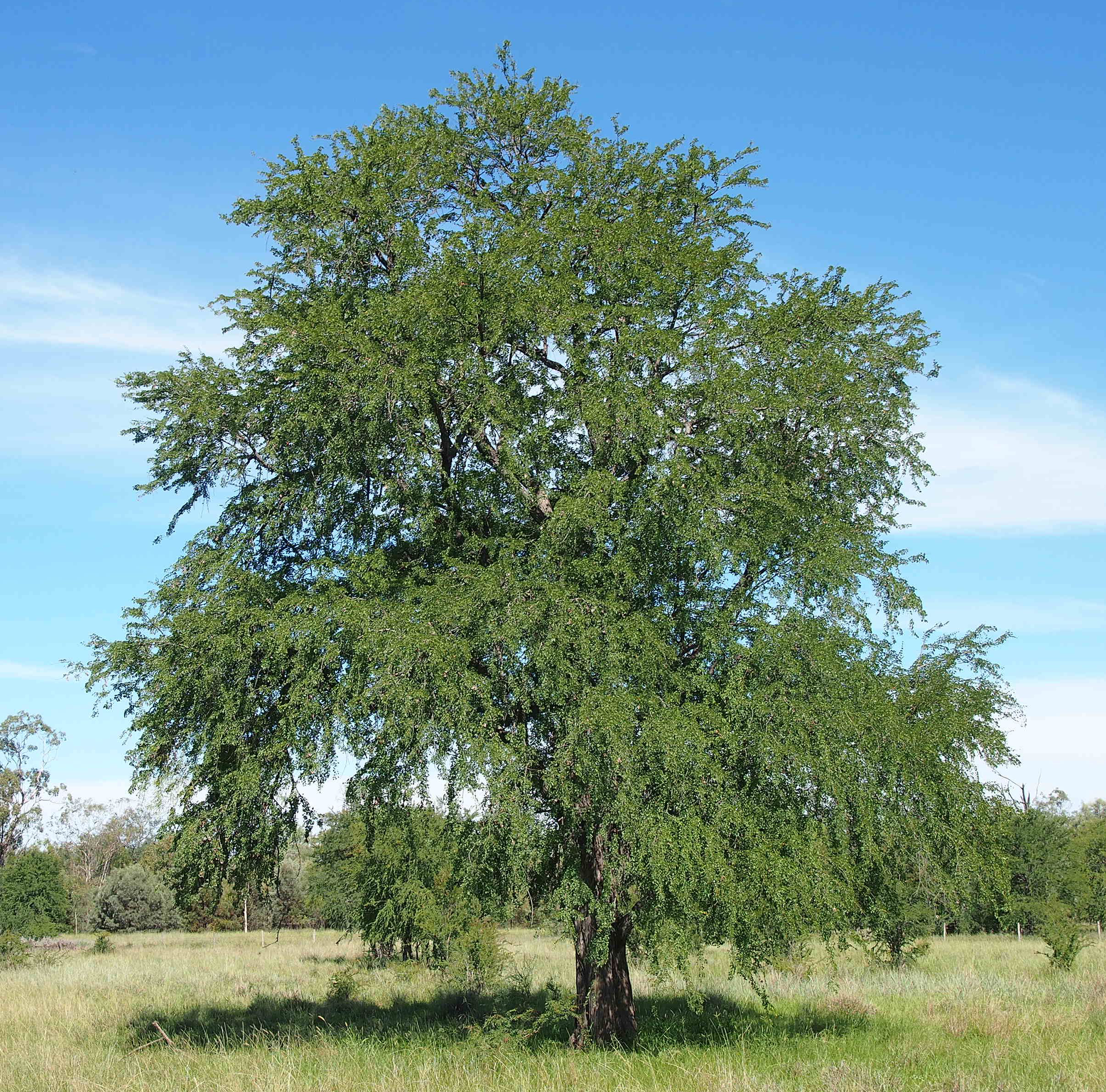
- Habit

Scientific classification
- Kingdom: Plantae
- Clade: Embryophytes
- Clade: Tracheophytes
- Clade: Spermatophytes
- Clade: Angiosperms
- Clade: Eudicots
- Clade: Rosids
- Order: Fabales
- Family: Fabaceae
- Genus: Lysiphyllum
- Species: L. hookeri

Binomial name
- Lysiphyllum hookeri (F.Muell.) Pedley

Synonyms
- Bauhinia hookeri F.Muell.

= Lysiphyllum hookeri =

Species of legume

Lysiphyllum hookeri is a species of small tree endemic to Queensland, Australia, of the legume plant family Fabaceae. These trees are known by a variety of common names, including pegunny, alibangbang, Hooker's bauhinia, white bauhinia, mountain ebony and Queensland ebony.

== Taxonomy ==
It, along with the rest of the genus Lysiphyllum was formerly treated as part of the genus Bauhinia. However, molecular phylogenetic analysis confirms that Lysiphyllum is a distinct genus from Bauhinia.

== Range and habitat ==
These trees grow naturally in monsoon forest, littoral rainforest and occasionally in more open forest types in north-eastern Australia. It has also been widely cultivated throughout Australia and the pacific region as a drought-tolerant ornamental plant.

== Description ==
As with most members of the genus, this species produces compound leaves with only a single pair of leaflets, producing a bi-lobed leaf that resembles the wings of a butterfly. Showy white flowers are produced throughout the year dependent on rainfall, and are accented by long red stamens. They also have a lovely delicate scent. The flowers are followed by flat pods containing multiple seeds.

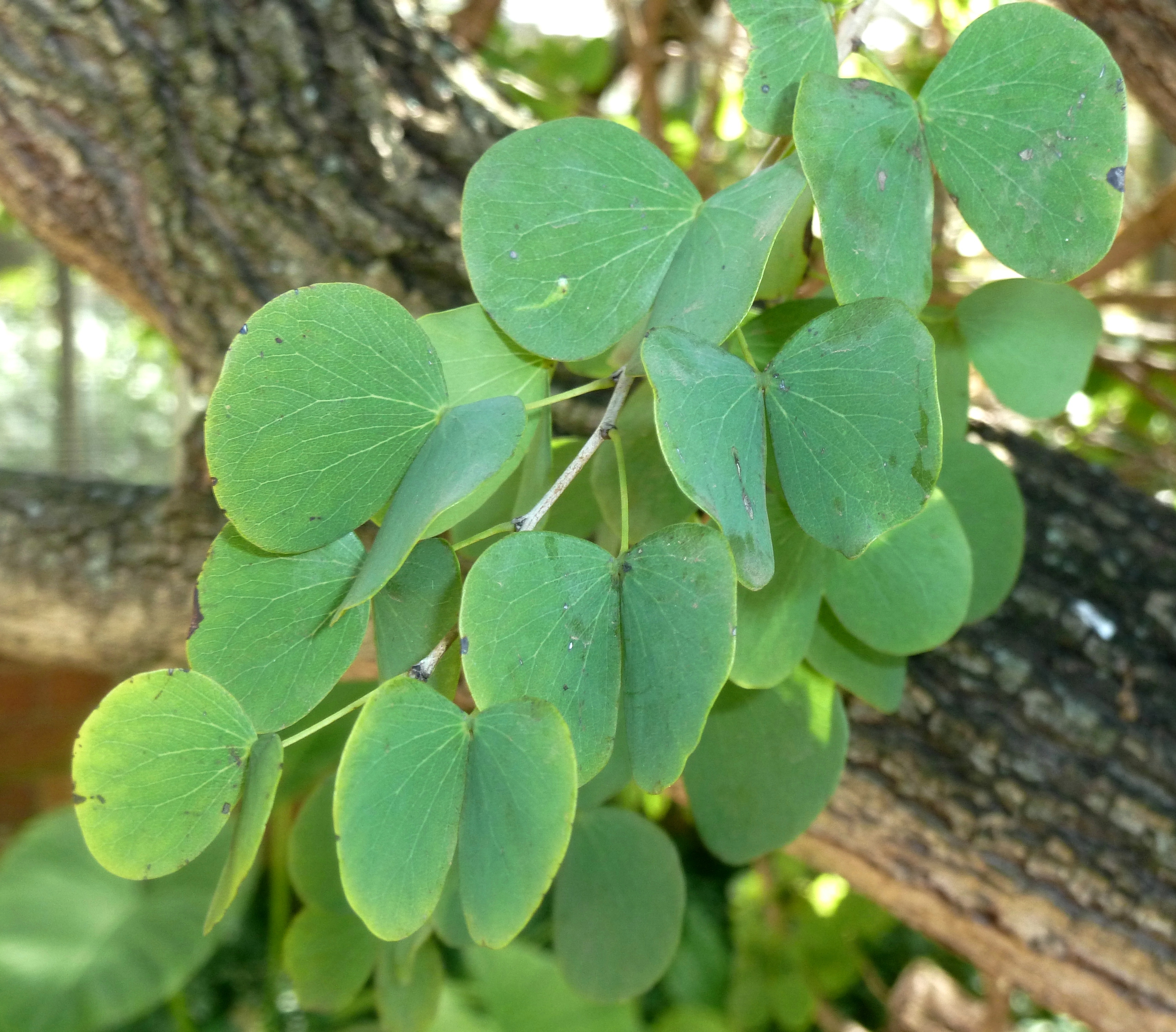
foliage

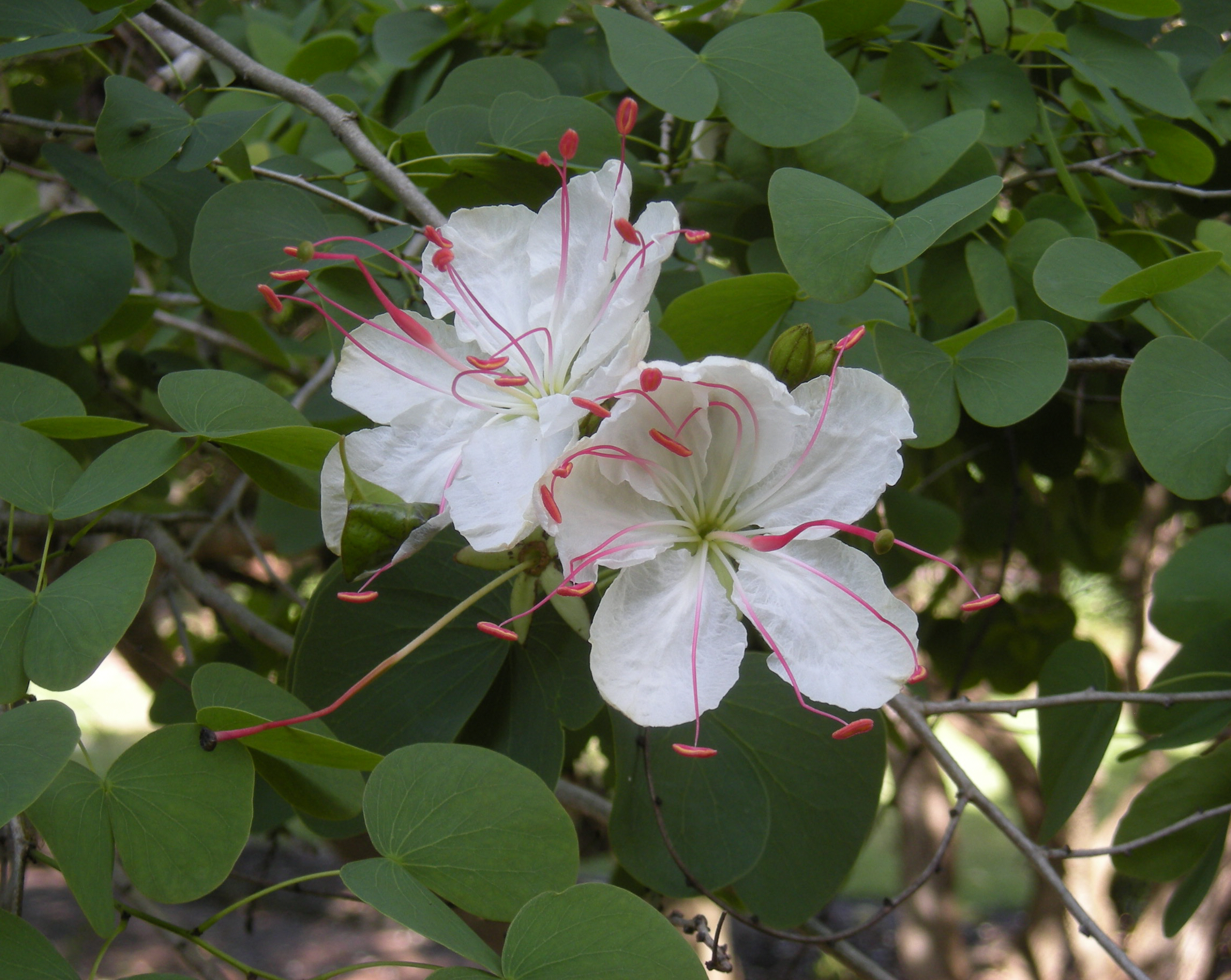
flowers
