= Cryptocoryne mekongensis =

Scientific classification
- Kingdom: Plantae
- Clade: Tracheophytes
- Clade: Angiosperms
- Clade: Monocots
- Order: Alismatales
- Family: Araceae
- Genus: Cryptocoryne
- Species: C. mekongensis

Binomial name
- Cryptocoryne mekongensis T. Idei, J.D. Bastmeijer, and N. Jacobsen

Species of plant

Cryptocoryne mekongensis is a species belonging to the Araceae genus Cryptocoryne that was described in 2010.

== Distribution ==
The species is found in the Mekong region of southern Laos and Cambodia.

== Description ==
The species is characterized by a one to three times twisted spathe limb that is purple colored at the inside, with a purple collar. The limb also has pronounced transverse surface ridges.

== Cultivation ==
The species is easy to cultivate emersed with much light in a sandy soil with some loam added.
