= Begonia bonus-henricus =

Conservation status
- Endangered (IUCN 3.1)

Scientific classification
- Kingdom: Plantae
- Clade: Tracheophytes
- Clade: Angiosperms
- Clade: Eudicots
- Clade: Rosids
- Order: Cucurbitales
- Family: Begoniaceae
- Genus: Begonia
- Species: B. bonus-henricus

Binomial name
- Begonia bonus-henricus J.J.de Wilde

Species of flowering plant

Begonia bonus-henricus is a species of plant in the family Begoniaceae. It is endemic to Cameroon. Its natural habitat is subtropical or tropical moist lowland forests. It is threatened by habitat loss. It was named after Hendrik de Wit.
