= Didelotia idae =

Conservation status
- Near Threatened (IUCN 2.3)

Scientific classification
- Kingdom: Plantae
- Clade: Tracheophytes
- Clade: Angiosperms
- Clade: Eudicots
- Clade: Rosids
- Order: Fabales
- Family: Fabaceae
- Genus: Didelotia
- Species: D. idae

Binomial name
- Didelotia idae Oldem., De Wit. & Leon.

Species of legume

Didelotia idae is a species of plant in the family Fabaceae, found in Ivory Coast, Ghana, Liberia and Sierra Leone. It is threatened by habitat loss. The wood of the species is traded under the name 'Gombe'.

== Description ==
Didelotia idae is a medium to large sized tree capable of reaching 45 m tall but has been observed at more than 50 m. Its diameter can be up to 1.5 m; its crown is compact and wide with ascending foliage, in a deltoid shape, while the trunk is straight, mostly smooth and greyish in color but sometimes dark brown; the slash is thick, reddish and fibrous exuding a brown latex. Leaves are simple or alternate while stipules and petioles are present; stipules can reach up to 2 - 4 mm long and petioles up to 2 - 5 mm long. Leaflets are ovate to elliptic in shape. They can be up to 10 cm long and 6 cm wide with an acute to notched apex and a rounded to broadly cuneate base. The inflorescences are arranged in axillary or terminal panicles, 6 - 15 cm long. The fruit is a yellowish brown pod that is three-seeded and up to 11 cm in length.

== Distribution and habitat ==
The tree occurs in West Africa, in Liberia, Sierra Leone and in Ivory Coast. It is found in evergreen forests on flat valleys, rolling hills or in steep rocky slopes.

== Uses ==
The wood is used as planks in Liberia for carpentry work.
