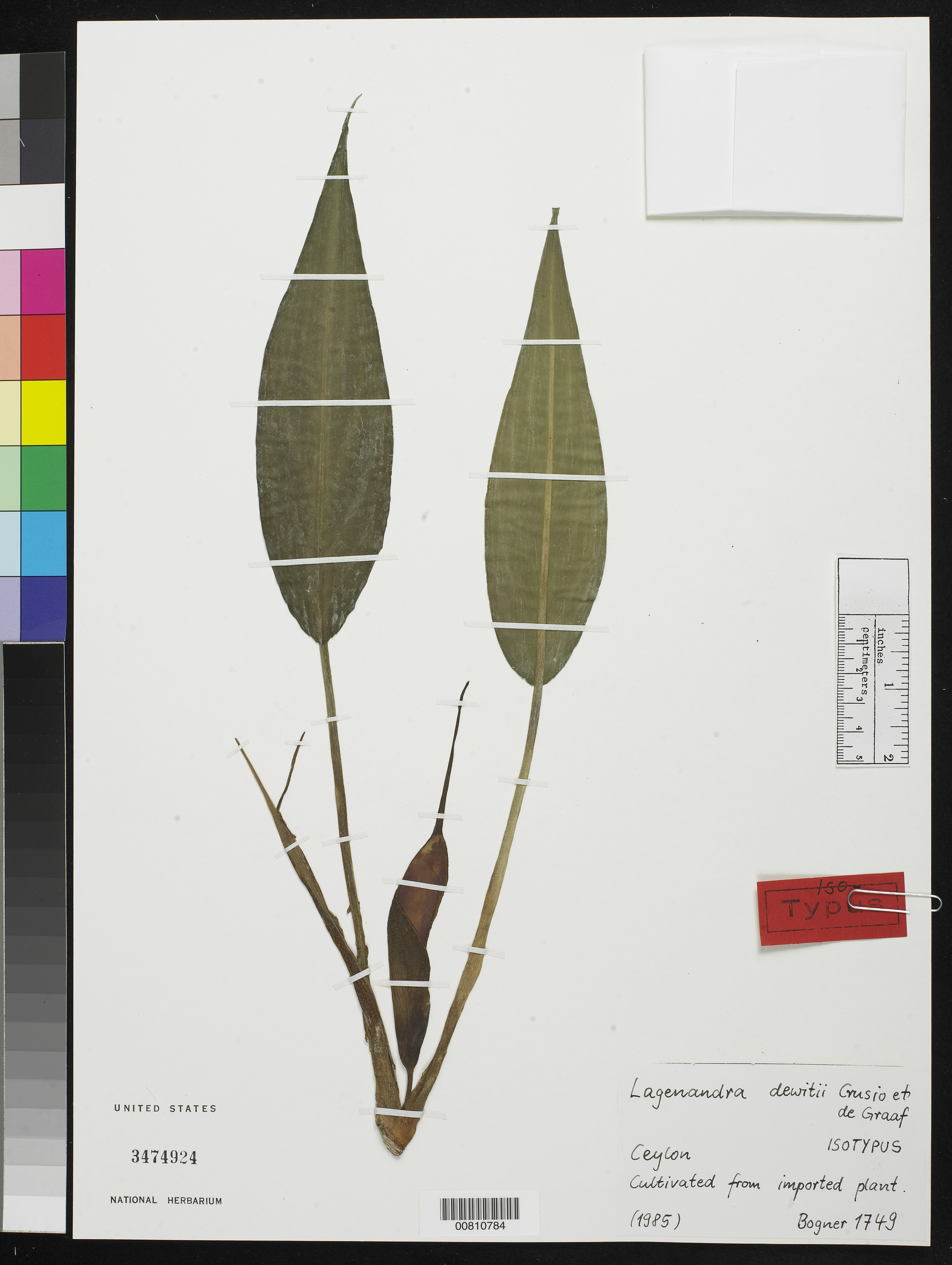

Scientific classification
- Kingdom: Plantae
- Clade: Tracheophytes
- Clade: Angiosperms
- Clade: Monocots
- Order: Alismatales
- Family: Araceae
- Genus: Lagenandra
- Species: L. dewitii

Binomial name
- Lagenandra dewitii Crusio et de Graaf

= Lagenandra dewitii =

Species of flowering plant

Lagenandra dewitii is an aquatic to semi-aquatic flowering plant species belonging to the aroid genus Lagenandra. It was first described in 1986, from living plants and dried herbarium material, and named in honour of Dutch botanist Hendrik de Wit.

== Distribution ==
- Sri Lanka
