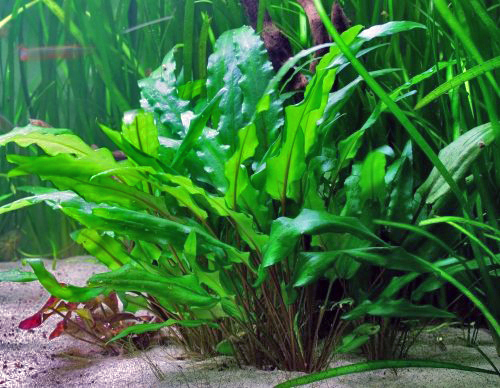
- Cryptocoryne wendtii 'Green'

Scientific classification
- Kingdom: Plantae
- Clade: Tracheophytes
- Clade: Angiosperms
- Clade: Monocots
- Order: Alismatales
- Family: Araceae
- Subfamily: Aroideae
- Tribe: Cryptocoryneae
- Genus: Cryptocoryne; Fisch. ex Wydler

Synonyms
- Myrioblastus Wall. ex Griff.

= Cryptocoryne =

Genus of aquatic plants

Cryptocoryne is a genus of aquatic plants from the family Araceae. The genus is naturally distributed in tropical regions of India, Southeast Asia and New Guinea. The English common name "water trumpet" refers to their inflorescence, a spadix enclosed by a spathe (typical for the whole family), which resembles a trumpet. The genus is commonly referred to as Crypts by aquarium hobbyists.

The typical habitats of Cryptocoryne are mostly streams and rivers with not too rapidly flowing water, in the lowland forest. They also live in seasonally inundated forest pools or on river banks submerged only at high water.

== Taxonomy ==
=== Taxonomic history ===
The first Cryptocoryne species was described in 1779 as Arum spirale by Retzius. The genus was described by Friedrich Ernst Ludwig von Fischer in 1828. However, the scientific classification of Cryptocoryne species remains controversial.

=== Relationship with other genera of Araceae ===
Lagenandra is another genus closely related to the genus Cryptocoryne. The two can be easily told apart since the leaves of Cryptocoryne species exhibit convolute vernation whereas Lagenandra species exhibit involute vernation.

== Etymology ==
The name Cryptocoryne is derived from the Greek crypto, hidden, and koryne, meaning club. The common name (water trumpet) refers to the shape of its inflorescence, which is typical of the Araceae family.

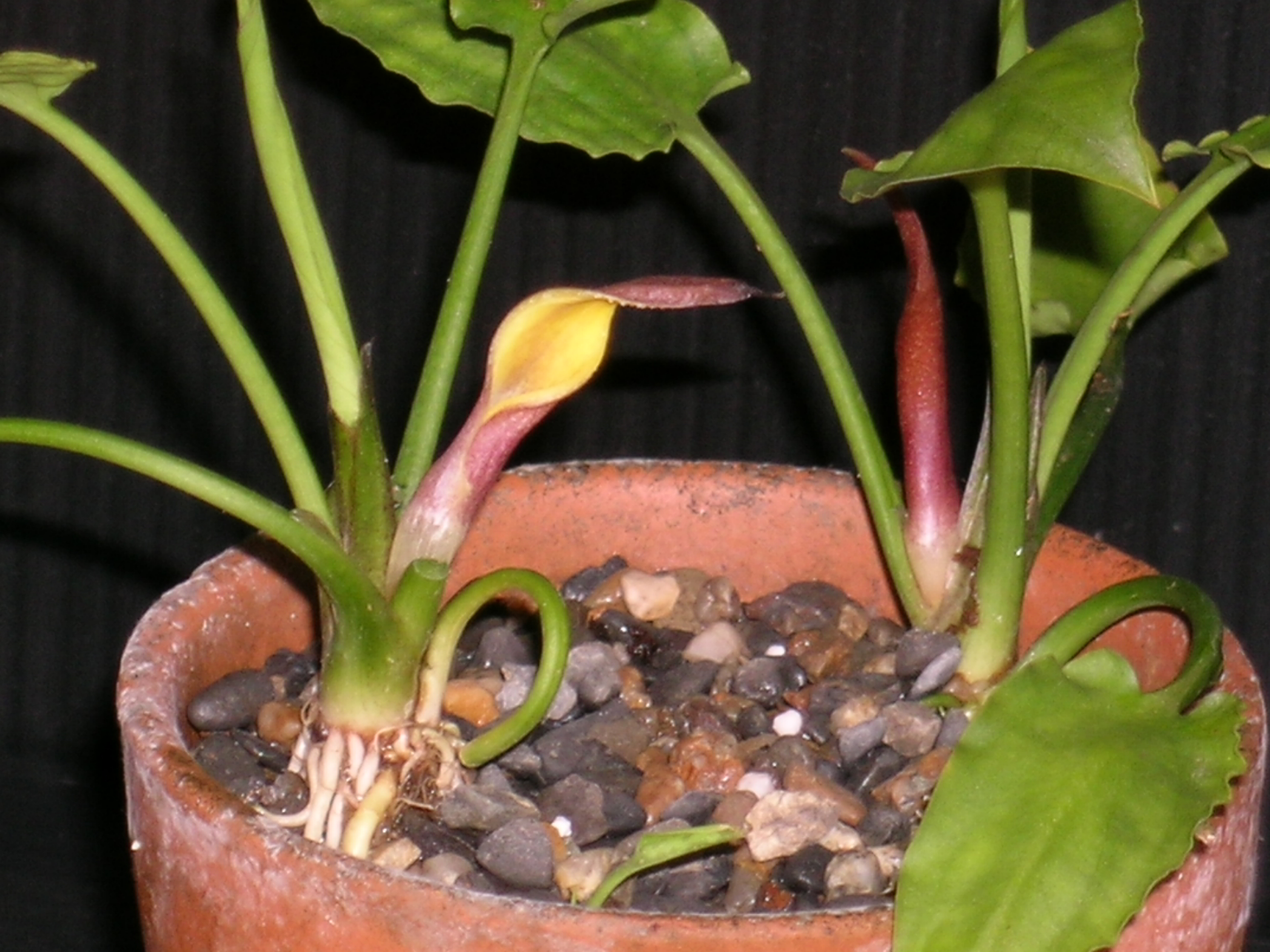
Inflorescence of C. pontederiifolia

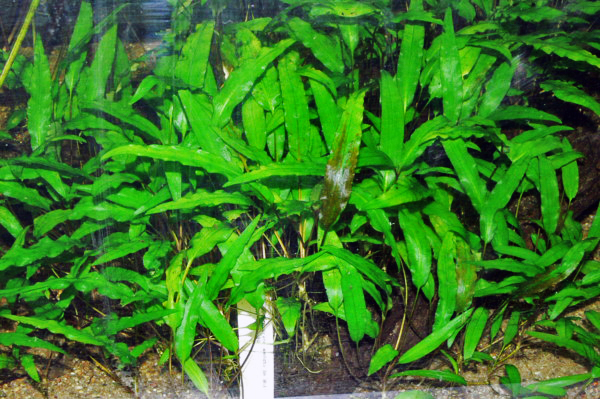
C. wendtii "Green", the most popular Cryptocoryne

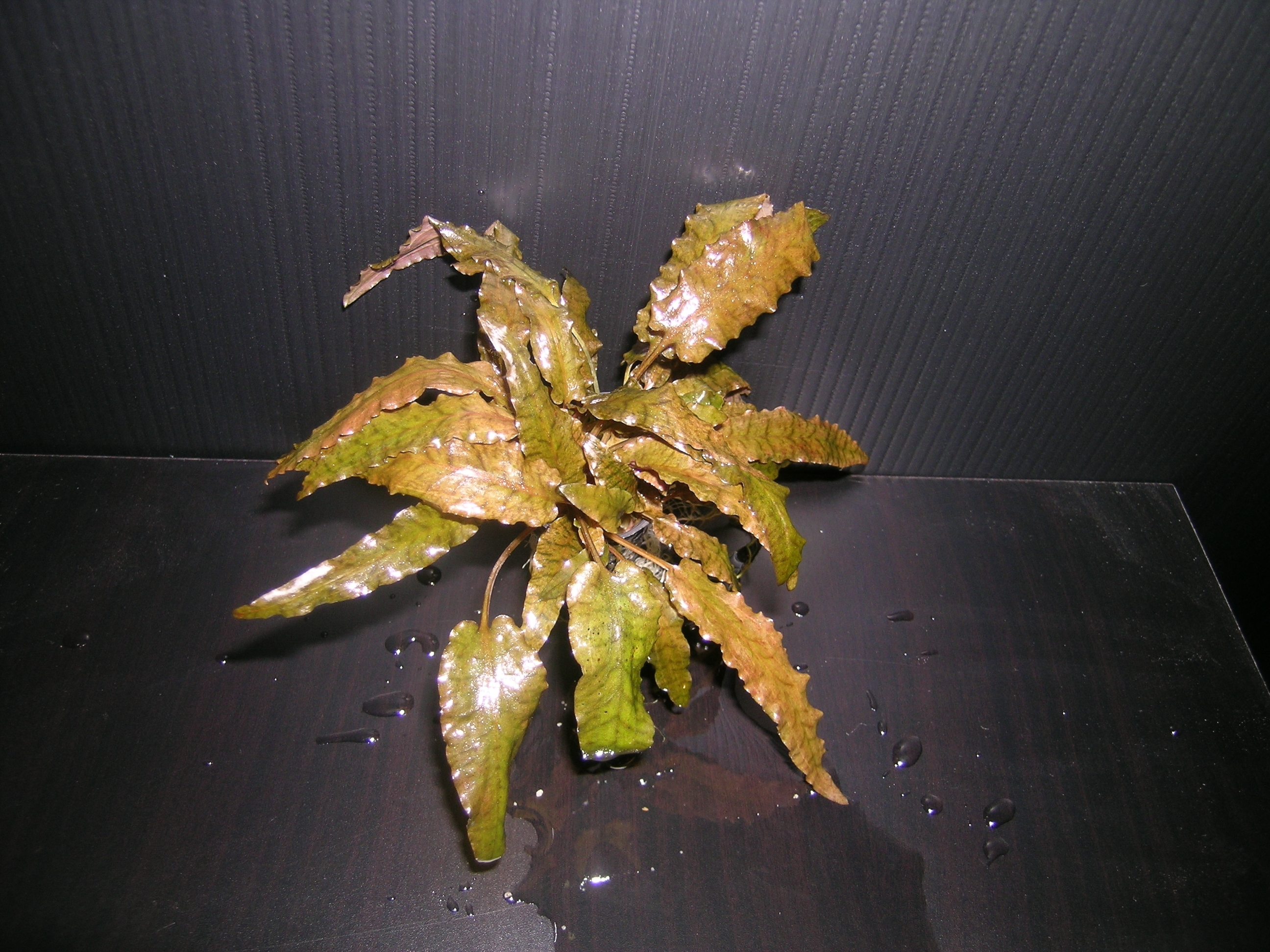
A form of C. wendtii produced by Tropica Aquarium Plants

== Cultivation and uses ==
Some Cryptocoryne are popular commercially cultivated aquarium plants. Submerged plants reproduce vegetatively, emerse plants may flower and reproduce sexually. Many species are cultivated only by dedicated experts and are very hard to grow, or are not present in a culture at all. Some species are endangered because their natural habitats are disappearing. On the other hand, some water trumpets (e.g. Cryptocoryne beckettii) are very hardy aquarium plants, easy to grow to the point that they have become an invasive species after being introduced in Florida in North America.

Cryptocoryne is either found in peat bogs or on limestone; the latter do well in most aquaria, the former must have soft water to survive and need decomposing leaf litter to do well. C. striolata, while found primarily in peat bogs, has also been found growing on limestone. Borneo is home to many endemic crypts previously thought to grow only in tea-colored soft acid water emulating peat bogs but exploration of habitats from 2005 to 2010 showed about half grew on limestone as well. These hardwater Cryptocorynes are generally the easier ones to keep (in fact, some species, such as Cryptocoryne wendtii are said to be among the most versatile of aquarium plants); they tolerate low or bright light but grow faster in more intense light. This water plant's range is around 12 to 33 °C, and slightly alkaline to neutral pH.

Plants of the genus Cryptocoryne, which range from India to New Guinea are found in very diverse conditions. Some are true acid loving plants such as C. pallidnerva, found in peat bogs in Borneo, while others such as C. crispatula var. balansae and C. pontiderifolia are found in streams with limestone beds—hard alkaline water. One species, C. ciliata is even found in semi-brackish water in some areas. It is one of the few aquarium plants that tolerates salt concentrations.

Cryptocoryne plants have been in cultivation in the aquarium hobby since the late 18th century, although it was not until the 1960s that more than a handful of species was known and became more common in the hobby. New species still regularly crop up as interest in these plants widens and more collecting expeditions by private parties are carried out.

== Crypt melt ==
A phenomenon often encountered when planting new crypts in an aquarium is commonly called Crypt melt, whereby the plant loses all its leaves. There seem to be two possible causes for this.

Rapid environmental change is thought to trigger this, as these plants do not seem to adapt well to transplantion, and may need 30 days or so to become established and for the leaves to regrow. Experienced growers report that it is better to plant crypts in aquariums that have been established for at least three months.

In the wild, crypts can grow fully submerged underwater, but in some plant nurseries they are often grown emersed and crypt melt could then be triggered by the change from emerse to submerse conditions.

There is lately a trend for such nurseries to send crypts as just a rootstock (i.e. without the leaves) to reduce shipping costs and because the leaves will be lost anyway once planted in an aquarium.

Other reports emphasise the need to change the aquarium water regularly to prevent the buildup of nitrates which are thought to trigger this condition (often referred to as a disease).

== Species ==
- Cryptocoryne affinis N.E.Br. in J.D.Hooker - Thailand, Malaysia
- Cryptocoryne alba de Wit - Sri Lanka
- Cryptocoryne albida R.Parker - southern China, eastern India, Bangladesh, Indochina
- Cryptocoryne annamica Serebryanyi - Vietnam
- Cryptocoryne aponogetifolia Merr. - Philippines
- Cryptocoryne aura - West kalimantan
- Cryptocoryne auriculata Engl. - Sarawak, Philippines
- Cryptocoryne bangkaensis Bastm. - Sumatra
- Cryptocoryne beckettii Thuill. ex Trim. - Sri Lanka; naturalized in Texas
- Cryptocoryne bogneri Rataj - Sri Lanka
- Cryptocoryne bullosa Becc. - Sarawak
- Cryptocoryne ciliata (Roxb.) Schott - India, Bangladesh, Indochina, Malaysia, Indonesia, New Guinea, Philippines
- Cryptocoryne cognata Schott - India
- Cryptocoryne consobrina Schott - India
- Cryptocoryne cordata var. cordata Griff. - Malaysia
- Cryptocoryne cordata var. siamensis Griff. - Thai
- Cryptocoryne cordata var. diderici Griff. - Sumatra
- Cryptocoryne cordata var. grandis Ridl. - Northeast Borneo
- Cryptocoryne cordata var. grabowskii Engl. - South Kalimantan
- Cryptocoryne cordata var. zonata de Wit. - Sri Aman
- Cryptocoryne coronata Bastm. & Wijng. - Philippines
- Cryptocoryne crispatula var. crispatula Engl. - Southeast Asia
- Cryptocoryne cruddasiana Prain - Myanmar
- Cryptocoryne decus-silvae de Wit - Johor
- Cryptocoryne dewitii N.Jacobsen - Papua New Guinea
- Cryptocoryne purpurea nothovar. edithiae de Wit - South Kalimantan
- Cryptocoryne elliptica N.E.Br. - Malaysia
- Cryptocoryne ferruginea Engl. - Sarawak
- Cryptocoryne fusca de Wit - Borneo
- Cryptocoryne griffithii Schott - Kalimantan, Peninsular Malaysia
- Cryptocoryne hudoroi Bogner & N.Jacobsen - Kalimantan
- Cryptocoryne ideii Budianto - Kalimantan
- Cryptocoryne jacobsenii de Wit - Sumatra
- Cryptocoryne joshanii Naive & Villanueva - Philippines
- Cryptocoryne keei N.Jacobsen - Sarawak
- Cryptocoryne lingua Becc. ex Engl - Sarawak
- Cryptocoryne loeiensis Bastm., T.Idei & N.Jacobsen - Laos, Thailand
- Cryptocoryne longicaudaBecc. ex Engl. - Borneo, Malaysia, Sumatra
- Cryptocoryne mekongensis T.Idei, Bastm. & N.Jacobsen - Cambodia, Laos, Thailand
- Cryptocoryne minima Ridl. - Malaysia, Sumatra
- Cryptocoryne moehlmannii de Wit - Sumatra
- Cryptocoryne nevillii Trimen - Sri Lanka
- Cryptocoryne noritoi Wongso - Kalimantan
- Cryptocoryne nurii var. nurii Furtado - Peninsular Malaysia
- Cryptocoryne nurii var. raubensis N.Jacobsen - Peninsular Malaysia
- Cryptocoryne pallidinervia Engl. - Borneo
- Cryptocoryne parva de Wit- Sri Lanka
- Cryptocoryne pontederiifolia Schott - Sumatra
- Cryptocoryne purpurea nothovar. purpurea Ridl. - Peninsular Malaysia
- Cryptocoryne purpurea nothovar. borneoensis N. Jacobsen, Bastm. - Central Kalimantan
- Cryptocoryne pygmaea Merr. - Philippines
- Cryptocoryne retrospiralis (Roxb.) Kunth - Bangladesh, India, Myanmar
- Cryptocoryne schulzei de Wit - Johor
- Cryptocoryne scurrilis de Wit - Sumatra
- Cryptocoryne sivadasanii Bogner - southern India
- Cryptocoryne spiralis (Retz.) Fisch. ex Wydler - Bangladesh, India
- Cryptocoryne srilankaensis Yakandawala - Sri Lanka
- Cryptocoryne striolata Engl. - Borneo
- Cryptocoryne thwaitesii Schott - Sri Lanka
- Cryptocoryne timahensis Bastm. - Singapore (C. cordata × C. nurii)
- Cryptocoryne uenoi Yuji Sasaki - Sarawak
- Cryptocoryne undulata Wendt - Sri Lanka
- Cryptocoryne usteriana Engl. - Philippines
- Cryptocoryne versteegii Engl. - New Guinea
- Cryptocoryne vietnamensis I.Hertel & H.Mühlberg - Vietnam
- Cryptocoryne villosa N.Jacobsen - Sumatra
- Cryptocoryne walkeri Schott - Sri Lanka
- Cryptocoryne wendtii de Wit - Sri Lanka
- Cryptocoryne × willisii Reitz - Sri Lanka (C. parva × C. walkeri)
- Cryptocoryne yujii Bastm. - Sarawak
- Cryptocoryne zaidiana Ipor & Tawan - Sarawak
- Cryptocoryne zukalii Rataj - Peninsular Malaysia
