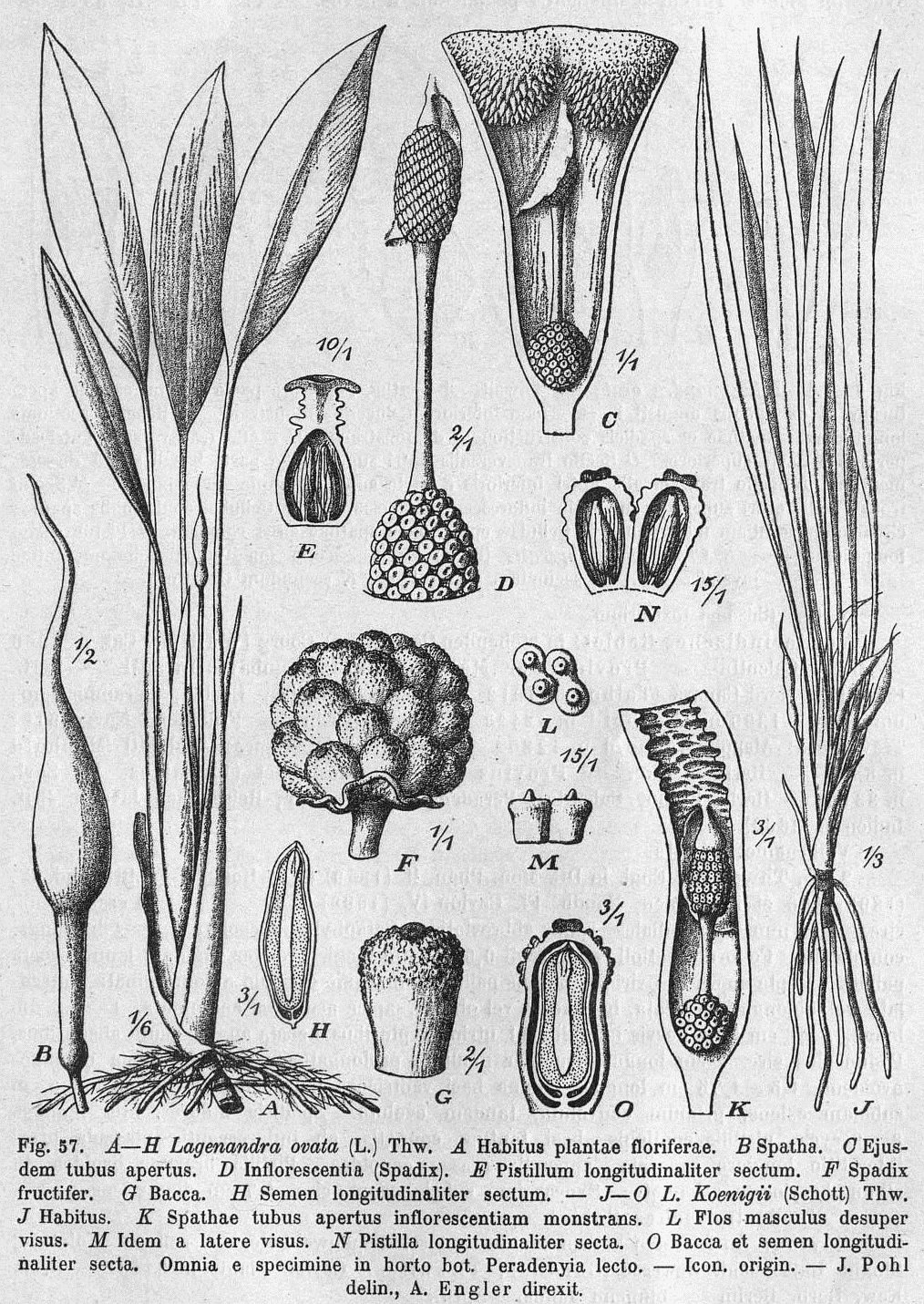
- Lagenandra ovata (left) and Lagenandra koenigii (right)
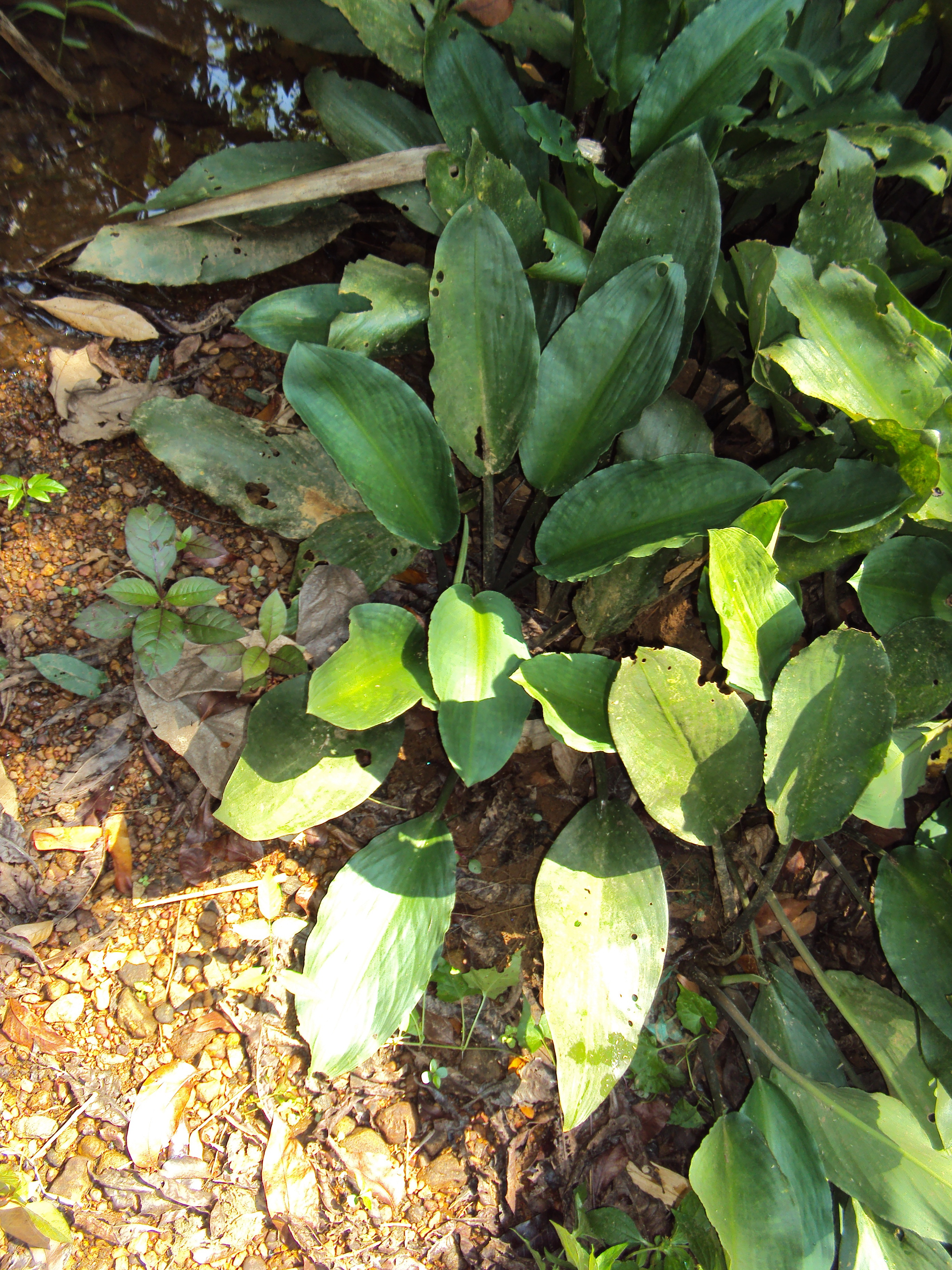
- Lagenandra toxicaria, in Kerala, South India.

Scientific classification
- Kingdom: Plantae
- Clade: Tracheophytes
- Clade: Angiosperms
- Clade: Monocots
- Order: Alismatales
- Family: Araceae
- Subfamily: Aroideae
- Tribe: Cryptocoryneae
- Genus: Lagenandra; Dalzell

= Lagenandra =

Genus of flowering plants

Lagenandra is a genus of aquatic (to semi-aquatic) flowering plants in the aroid family, Araceae, endemic to the Indian subcontinent (Bangladesh, India and Sri Lanka). The genus has gradually become more known through the aquascaping and aquarium hobby, in which several related Araceae genera are already highly prized and grown on a large scale (notably Anubias, Bucephalandra and Cryptocoryne); Lagenandra, however, is still relatively rare in cultivation or private collections.

The genus is visually-similar to (and, in places, sympatric with) the Cryptocoryne, but is distinguishable for its involute vernation (leaf growth); comparatively, Cryptocoryne tends to exhibit convolute vernation.

== Description ==
Helophytes, rarely rheophytes, with thick creeping rhizome; leaf blade simple, ovate to almost linear, fine venation transverse-reticulate; spathe tube with connate margins; spadix entirely enclosed in spathe tube; flowers unisexual, perigone absent. Differs from Cryptocoryne in having female flowers spirally arranged (pseudo-whorl in Lagenandra nairii, whorled in Lagenandra gomezii) and free; spathe tube "kettle" with connate margins (containing spadix) occupying entire spathe tube; spathe blade usually opening only slightly by a straight or twisted slit; berries free, opening from base; leaf ptyxis involute.

== Species ==
Accepted species are as follows. A key to the species described before 1986 was provided by Crusio and de Graaf.

1. Lagenandra bogneri de Wit - Sri Lanka
2. Lagenandra dewitii Crusio & de Graaf - Sri Lanka
3. Lagenandra erosa de Wit - Sri Lanka
4. Lagenandra gomezii (Schott) Bogner & Jacobsen - Bangladesh
5. Lagenandra jacobseni de Wit - Sri Lanka
6. Lagenandra keralensis Sivadasan & Jaleel - Kerala
7. Lagenandra koenigii (Schott) Thwaites - Sri Lanka
8. Lagenandra lancifolia (Schott) Thwaites - Sri Lanka
9. Lagenandra meeboldii (Engler) C.E.C. Fischer - southwestern India
10. Lagenandra nairii Ramamurthy & Rajan - southwestern India
11. Lagenandra ovata (L.) Thwaites - southwestern India, Sri Lanka
12. Lagenandra praetermissa de Wit & Nicolson - Sri Lanka
13. Lagenandra thwaitesii Engler - Sri Lanka
14. Lagenandra toxicaria Dalzell - southwestern India
15. Lagenandra undulata Sastry - Assam
