= Richard Neville Parker =

Richard Neville Parker (1884 - 1958) was an English botanist and forester who worked extensively in India.

== Publications ==
- 1921 . NW Himalayan Astragali of the subgenus Aegacantha
- 1924 . Botanical notes on some plants of the Kali valley
- 1925 . On the supposed occurrence of Salix alba L. in the north-west Himalaya
- 1928 . Two new bamboos from Burma
- 1931 . The herbarium of the Forest research institute . No. 73 of the Indian forest bulletin. 10 pp.
- 1931 . Name changes in important Indian trees
- 1932 . Casuarina root-nodules
- 1953 . Alien plants growing without cultivation in the West Somerset Neighborhood
