= Bedrock river =

Type of river

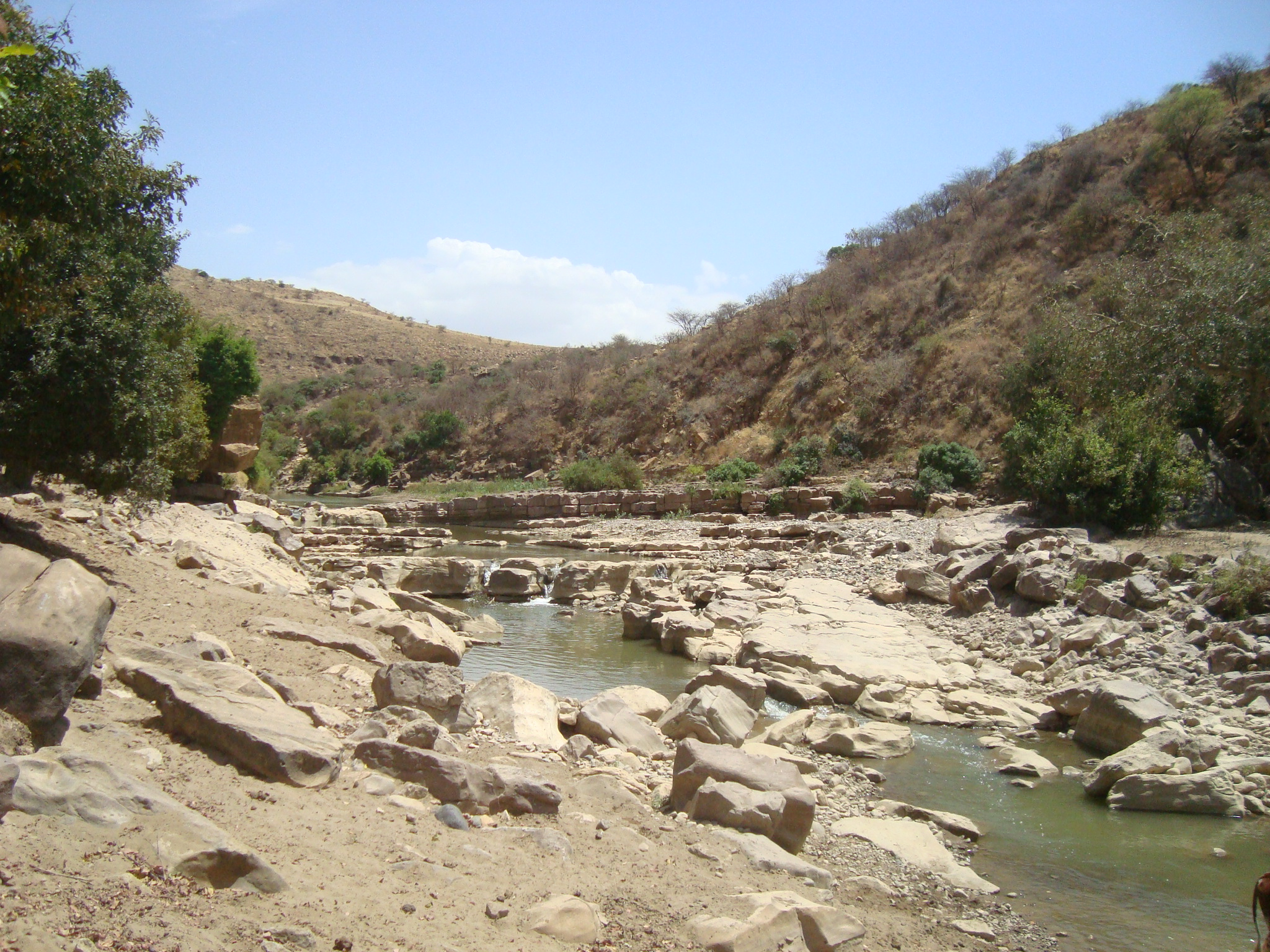
Giba River in Ethiopia

A bedrock river is a river that has little to no alluvium mantling the bedrock over which it flows. However, most bedrock rivers are not pure forms; they are a combination of a bedrock channel and an alluvial channel. The way one can distinguish between bedrock rivers and alluvial rivers is through the extent of sediment cover.

The extent of sediment coverage is based upon the sediment flux supplied to the channel and the channel transport capacity. Bedrock rivers are typically found in upland or mountainous regions. Their formation can have several erosional factors.

Bedrock rivers are also one of the only ways to study incision into bedrock that is not related to glaciers.

== Forming and erosion ==
Bedrock incision can be caused by tectonic plate movement. As the land is uplifted the river is forced to incise into the bedrock to keep flowing. Incision can be carried out through a variety of erosional processes. The type of bedrock may change as a river flows downstream, affecting erosional processes. The main processes being: stream power, abrasion, quarrying, wedging, and dissolution. These rivers are a combination of all of these processes but are dependent upon the individual river and its type of bedrock.

=== Stream power ===
Stream power is the process energy from the water converted into kinetic energy due to the steepening in slope. When water is being transported down a channel, it is doing so by gravitational potential energy. Due to the laws of conservation of energy, energy that is lost traveling downstream must be transformed into another type of energy. The energy form that is it transformed into is the kinetic energy of the water beating on the bedrock. The rate of the potential energy loss is calculated in the stream power of the river. The stream power equation is:

$\Omega = \mathrm{\rho{}gQS}$

where:

$\Omega$ = stream power
$\rho$ = water density
g = gravitational constant
Q = hydraulic discharge of the stream (m^{3}/s)
S = slope of the channel

This equation suggests that stream power might be the single most important factor in bedrock incision. In an alluvial river the stream power would be more of a transport because it would be picking up loose material and depositing it, but with a constant influx of sediment it would not be incising.

=== Abrasion ===
Abrasion is the process by which sediments are transported in the flow. The rate of erosion done using abrasion is affected by the strength of the bedrock. Forms of erosion include "abrasion, plucking, cavitation, debris-flow scour and weathering" (4). Abrasion is also affected by the amount of sediment load present in the river. Too much sediment and most of the particles will not have enough energy; too little and not enough of the particles will come into contact with the bed. The process can erode individual grains, or flakes from the rocks surface. The most common indicators of abrasion is potholes in the bedrock or a trough-like shape to the river. There are three types of sediment transport in a fluvial process: dissolved load, suspended load, and bed load. The process that most affects a bedrock river is the suspended load.

Suspended load is the grains that are light enough to be carried in the water and do not contact the bed of the river unless there is an obstruction or topographic change in the bed. The way these particles erode a bedrock river is by contact with these obstructions. Being as they are carried as part of the river flow they have a significantly higher kinetic energy and coming into contact with an abnormality in the river bed can cause more damage than a larger grain with lower energy. The grain size that is normally held in the suspended load ranges from very fine to fine; clays and silts.

Bedload erosion can also be a major factor in bedrock erosion. It is caused by saltating grains or traction.

Saltating is where the grains are lifted up by the water and then tossed back down. Most of the time this is with gravels and if the stream power is big enough pebbles. However the clays and silts have too much cohesion to be transported by this method. When the particles come into contact with the bedrock they slowly wear away at its surface. They can gradually form micro-cracks or extend already existing cracks. The physics behind this erosional process states: the mass of the rock worn away by the incoming particle is directly proportional to the kinetic energy of that incoming particle.

Traction is where the sediment is too large to be picked up in the river flow but is small enough to be pushed or rolled along at a slower rate. Traction is covered in quarrying.

=== Quarrying ===
Quarrying (also known as plucking) is the process by which a chunk of the bedrock must be somehow removed from the bed of the river and then forced along the planar surface of the riverbed. This process is the most similar to glacial erosion. It is most effective in rivers where the jointing is close enough to allow the blocks to be moved by river flow.

The process of removing the piece of bedrock can be caused by many different factors. A crack or a flex in the bedrock will initially make a disconnected piece of the bedrock. Then, either by hydraulic wedging or frost-cracking the block can be forced out. If the bedrock is already highly jointed, fractured or a bedding plane it will be easier for the chunk to be removed. Highly jointed or bedding plane bedrock can make it easier for the blocks to be lifted or shifted out of their position. Scientists believe that this happens because of the weathering of joints surfaces. Subsequently, the joints are wedged apart and might be weakened by being bombarded by bedload particles.

Once the block of bedrock is removed it must then be pushed along the bed of the river. In order for this to happen the shear stress of the river on the top of the rock must exceed the frictional forces on the bottom of the rock. The blocks will eventually erode, but will cause headward erosion of the river while it exists.

=== Wedging ===
Wedging is the process by which small cracks appear in the bed of the river which are enlarged by smaller particles. It can cause large blocks of the river to be removed from the bed starting the quarrying process. The initial cracks appear due to a flux in the bedrock itself which is caused by a "rapid and large pressure variation". These can be caused by mass movements, or heavy storms. After the initial crack is made a small amount of sediment, sometimes no more than a grain, is passively deposited in the crack. When the bedrock flexes back into its original position the crack is left open due to the wedging. Gradually as more sediment accumulates in the crack it will widen and deepen. This is more common in an already jointed river bed.

=== Dissolution ===
Dissolution is the process by which the downstream change in the solute concentration is controlled by the dissolution rate of the rock. This process typically only affects a bedrock river when the rock is already prone to dissolution, such as a sandstone. One would be most likely to see this in caves made up of carbonate rocks. Some other factors that this process is dependent on are "the ratio of mineral surface are to water volume, the degree of chemical under-saturation, and the time it takes a water parcel to move through a reach." It is one of the least likely forms of incision but it does play a role in the process.

=== Cavitation ===
Cavitation is the formation and collapse of bubbles of vapor in a fluid stream. Formation of the bubbles is caused by a local reduction in absolute pressure to the vapor pressure of the fluid; collapse of the bubbles is caused by a subsequent pressure increases. The pressure reduction is usually caused by an increase in local velocity due to an irregular streamline (Bernoulli's Theorem). The mechanism is important because the powerful shock waves initiated by the collapse (i.e., implosion) of the bubbles cause rapid erosion of even the hardest materials. For example, cavitation eroded to a maximum depth of 18 inches of concrete in a dam spillway in 23 hours.

When velocity of a fluid stream increases, there is typically a reduction in pressure. If the velocity is sufficiently high, then the pressure drops to the vapor pressure of water, and a "stream" can form. This "stream" or water vapor occurs as small bubbles, a fraction of a centimeter in diameter, which forms at the point where this critical pressure is reached. These bubbles are rarely formed individually, but usually occurs in groups, giving water the appearance of foaming. The bubbles are soon carried away in the stream, or become momentarily lodged against the walls or any solid material. In either of these events, if there is a slight increase in pressure, the bubbles then become unstable, and collapse very quickly and violently. The collapse of a bubble in contact with a solid material produces a hammer-like blow of great strength on a very small area. If the bubble collapses in the stream, violent shock waves are produced, which rapidly dissipate unless they contact with a solid material, which they can erode. These bubbles can sometimes reach 30,000 atmospheres of pressure, so the effect of these "hammer blows" is immense, and can shatter the surface of any solid material.

The rate of erosion depends on the smoothness of the walls; the smoother the walls, the greater resistance to cavitation, and also vice versa. This means that erosion rates accelerate, as cavitation increases roughness, which increases cavitation, and becomes a positive feedback loop.

== Transport and deposition ==
Bedrock rivers are by definition bedrock, however that does not limit them from transporting all types of sediment and having sediment patches along its bed. The reason it is more likely to be a patch, rather than individual grains is that the grains are more likely to settle where the grain stability is increased. Grain stability is increased where the bedrock is rougher and where there is less kinetic energy in the water.

Even though grains can be deposited in bedrock rivers most of the time they will be transported through a bedrock section of a river to a more alluvial section of the river. The cohesion between particles will make it easier for them to be deposited in a patch as well. With nothing to hold the particles down in the bedrock section the particles will continually be picked up by the river and carried further downstream. This will develop in the form of "alluvial bed forms or bars". The deeper and wider the river is the more likely it is for grains to be deposited along the bed of the river. However this is also dependent on the slope and inflow of water.
