= Hendrik de Wit =

Dutch systematic botanist

Hendrik Cornelis Dirk de Wit
- Born: 24 October 1909; Purmerend, The Netherlands
- Died: 16 March 1999 (aged 89); Heelsum, The Netherlands
- Citizenship: Dutch
- Education: University of Amsterdam
- Known for: studies on Cryptocoryne and Lagenandra
- Scientific career
- Fields: Plant taxonomy
- Workplaces: Wageningen University and Research Centre
- Author abbrev. (botany): de Wit

Signature
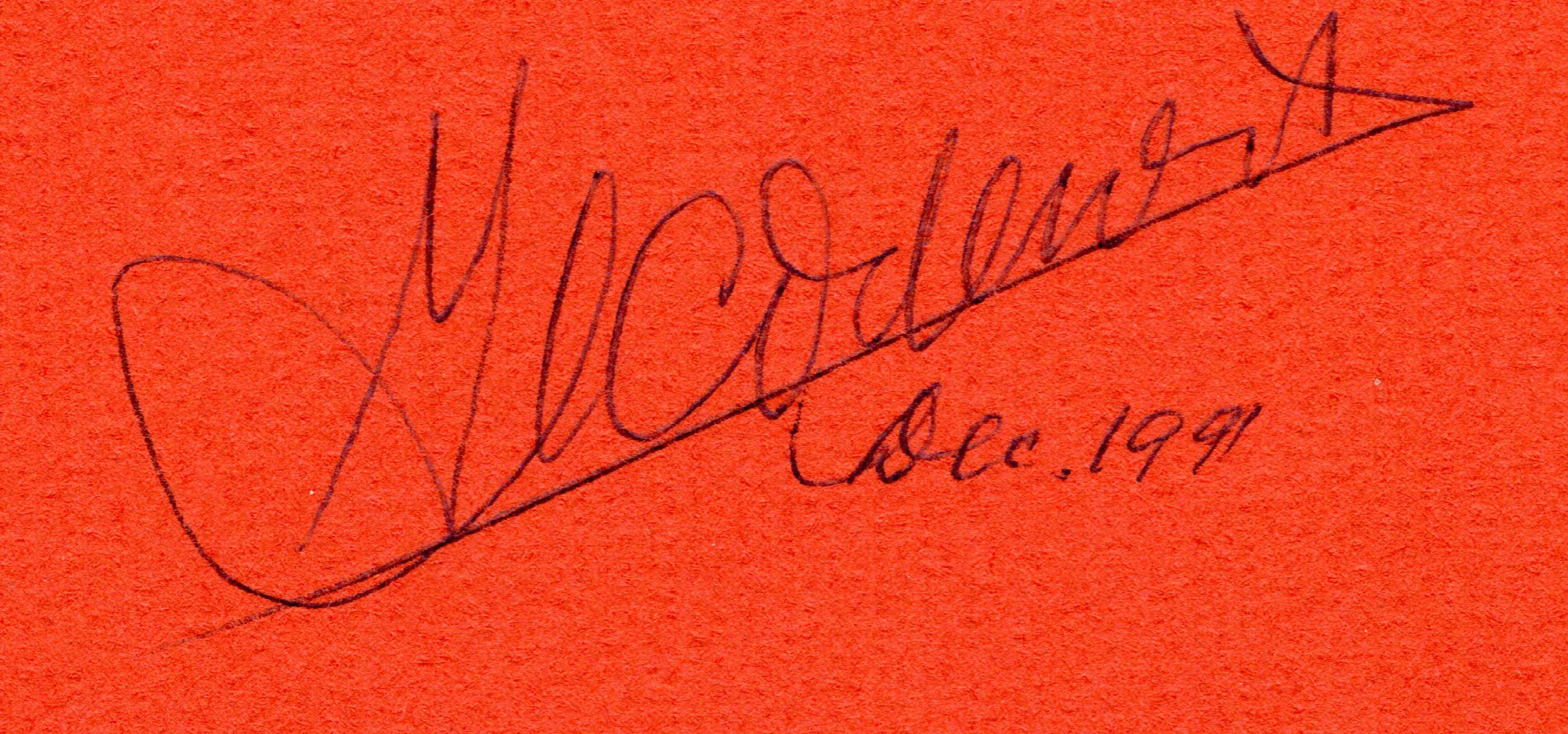

Hendrik (Henk) Cornelis Dirk de Wit (24 October 1909 – 16 March 1999) was a Dutch systematic botanist who contributed significantly to the knowledge of the Aroid genera Cryptocoryne and Lagenandra. He grew up in the Waterland, a marshy area in the Northwest Netherlands, and had a lifelong interest in aquatic plants.

== Career ==
De Wit studied biology at the University of Amsterdam from 1931 to 1937. In 1937 he left for Pretoria, South Africa, where he worked as an agricultural research officer with the Department of Agriculture. In 1941 he obtained his Ph.D. with a thesis on the genus Setaria from the grass family (Poaceae). In the same year, he moved to the Dutch East Indies (nowadays Indonesia).

During World War II de Wit worked in the 's Lands Plantentuin te Buitenzorg. After his return to The Netherlands in 1946 he worked for the Flora Malesiana Foundation. De Wit was a gifted teacher and on 20 September 1953 he became a lecturer at Leiden University where he taught plant taxonomy and morphology of flowering plants and on 1 November of the same year also at the Wageningen University and Research Centre, where he taught taxonomy and tropical and subtropical plant geography. In 1959 he left Leiden to become full professor in Wageningen and on 15 September 1969 he became the head of the Laboratory of Plant Taxonomy and Plant Geography there. De Wit retired in 1980, at which occasion a Festschrift was published in his honour.

== Scientific work ==
De Wit was especially interested in the Aroid genus Cryptocoryne, as well as the closely related Lagenandra on which he published extensively. In all, he described 21 new species of Cryptocoryne and 6 species of the related genus Lagenandra. A lifelong hobby were freshwater aquaria and in the late 1950s he edited an encyclopaedia for aquarists in 15 volumes, 2 of which (volumes 5 and 6) dealt with aquarium plants and were written by himself. In 1966 these volumes were revised and published together as the first edition of his book Aquariumplanten was published. It was translated in English in 1964 and in German in 1971. After his retirement, he wrote a history of biology (Ontwikkelingsgeschiedenis van de biologie) in three volumes (1982–1989). A popularized version appeared in 1993 (Wat is leven? Een cultuurgeschiedenis van de biologie).

== Primitiae Africanae ==
The first results of research workers in African botanical taxonomy, prepared under supervision of de Wit, were published in a series named Primitiae Africanae. Twelve articles were published in total, in different taxonomic journals.

== Eponymous species ==
Several plant species were named in his honour, such as Begonia bonus-henricus J.J. de Wilde, Crudia dewitii Kostermans, Cryptocoryne dewitii Jacobsen, Dichapetalum witianum Bret., Homalium dewitii Kostermans, Bauhinia dewitii K.Larsen & S.S.Larsen, Rinorea dewitii Achound., and Lagenandra dewitii Crusio et de Graaf.

== Major works ==
- de Wit, H.C.D. (1982–1989). Ontwikkelingsgeschiedenis van de biologie (in Dutch). Vol. 1, 2a, 2b. Wageningen, The Netherlands: PUDOC, Centrum voor Landbouwpublicaties en Landbouwdocumentatie. pp. xxxiii+1429. ISBN 9022007839.
