= List of ornamental aquatic plants in Venezuela =

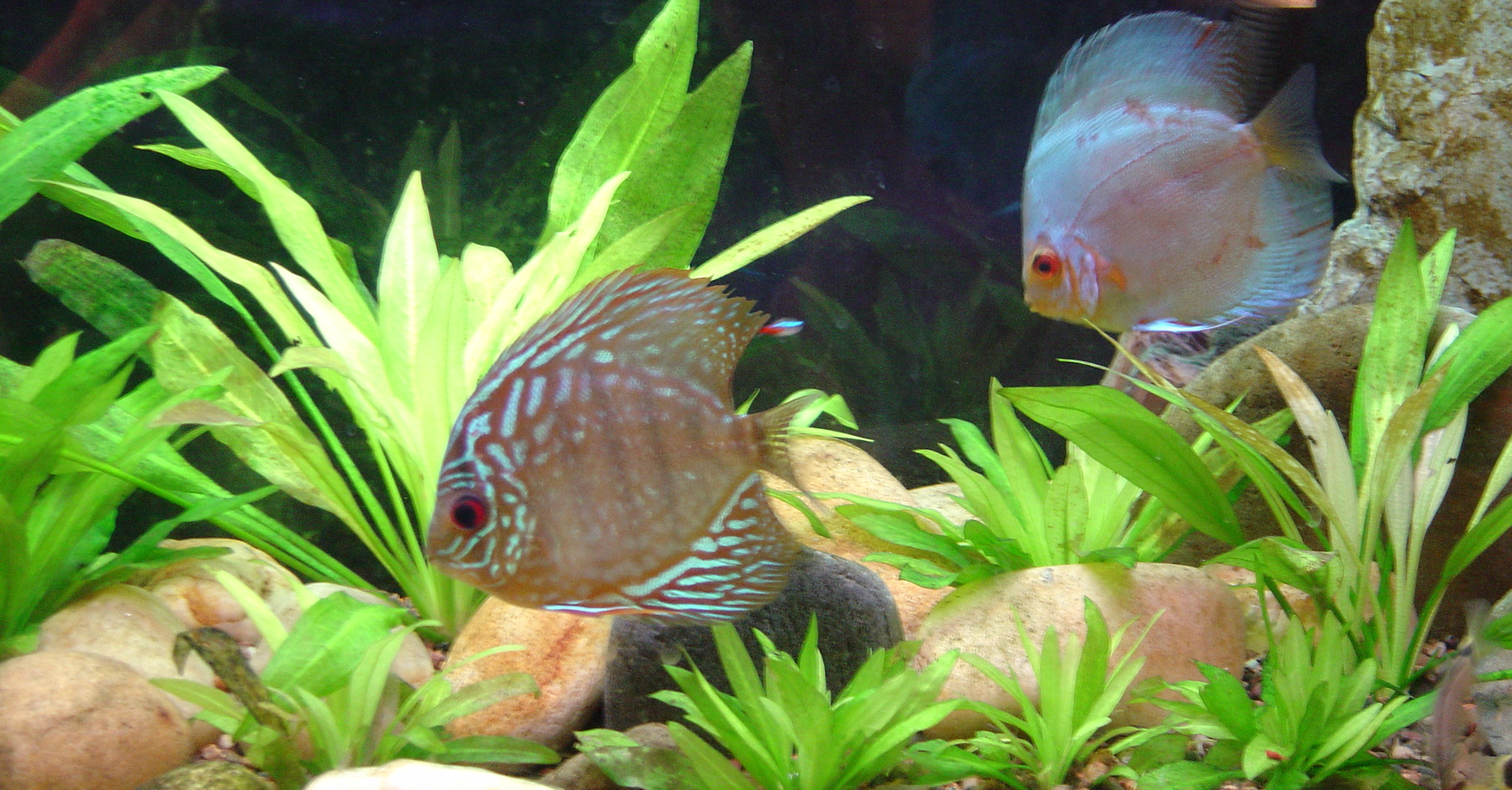
Echinodorus bleheri

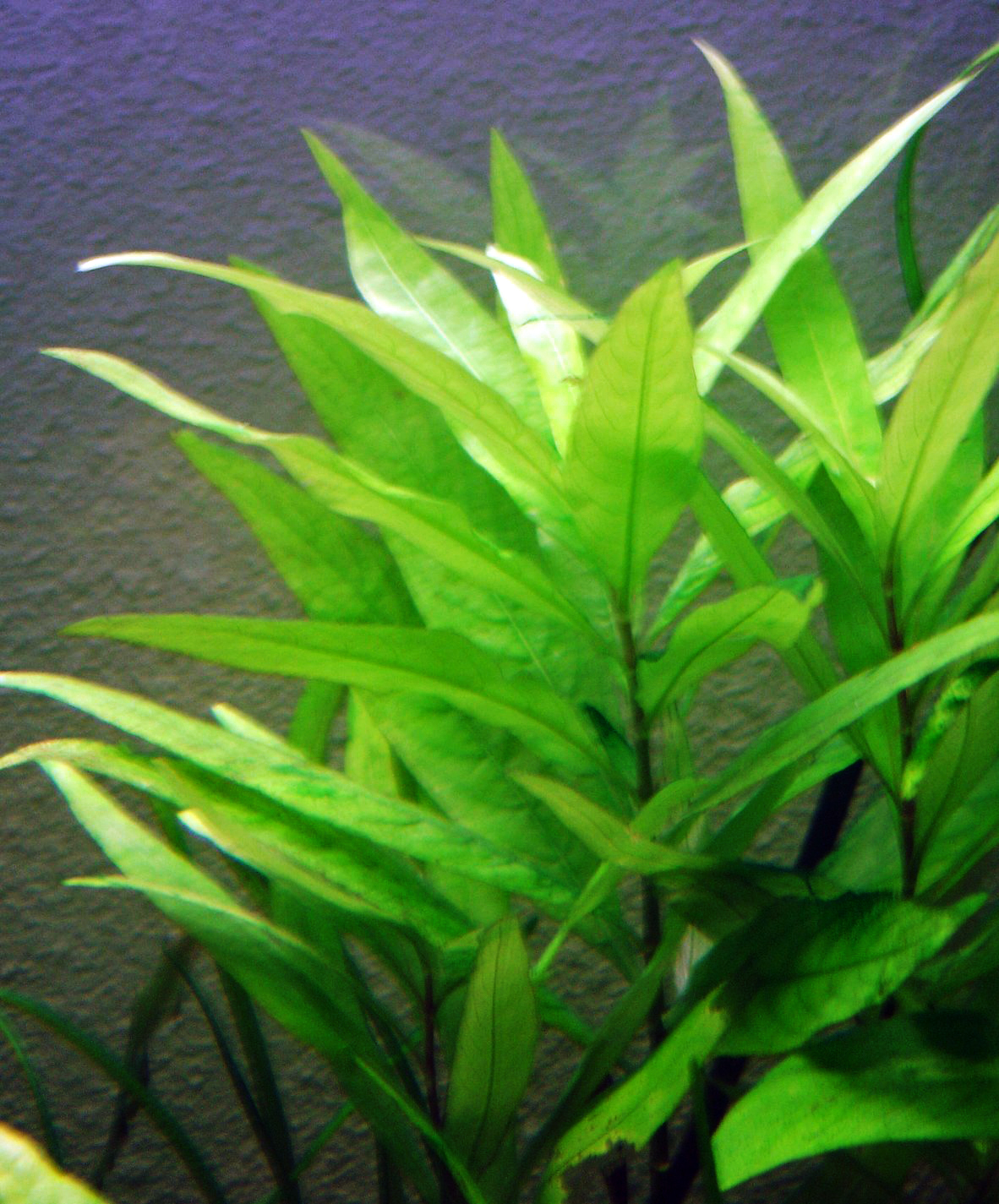
Hygrophila corymbosa

These ornamental aquatic plants are all found naturally in Venezuela and are commonly used in aquariums.

This listing is a partial list and sorted by families and genera in alphabetical form.

== Acanthaceae ==
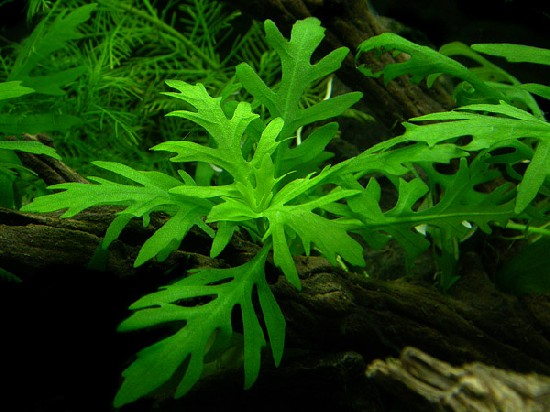
Hygrophila difformis

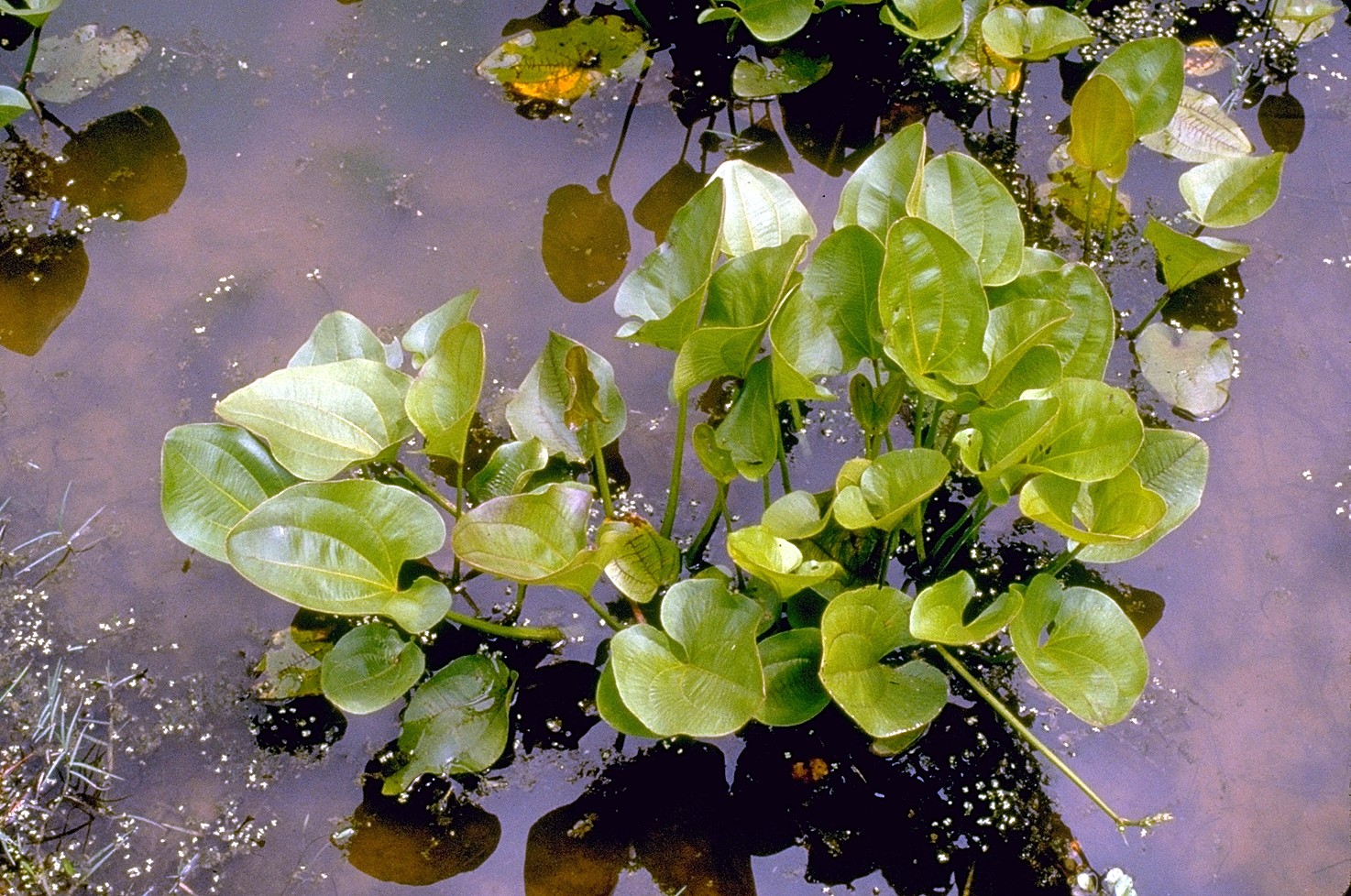
Echinodorus cordifolius

- Hygrophila corymbosa Lindau
- Hygrophila difformis Blume, 1826
- Hygrophila polysperma Anderson

== Alismataceae ==
- Echinodorus bleheri Rataj en Preslia, 1970
- Echinodorus berteroi (Spreng.) Fassett.
- Echinodorus bolivianum (Rusby) Lehtonen & Myllys.
- Echinodorus cordifolius (L.) Griseb.
- Echinodorus floribundus (Seub.) Seub.
- Echinodorus grandiflorus (Cham. Et SHL.) Mich.
- Echinodorus grisebachii Smal.
- Echinodorus horizontalis Rataj.
- Echinodorus longipetalus Micheli in A. & C. DC.
- Echinodorus parviflorus Rataj, 1970
- Echinodorus subalatus Grisebach, 1866
- Echinodorus scraber Rataj, 1970
- Echinodorus tenellum (Mart. ex Schult. & Schult. f.) Britton.
- Echinodorus trialatus Fassett.
- Sagittaria graminea Michx.

== Araceae ==
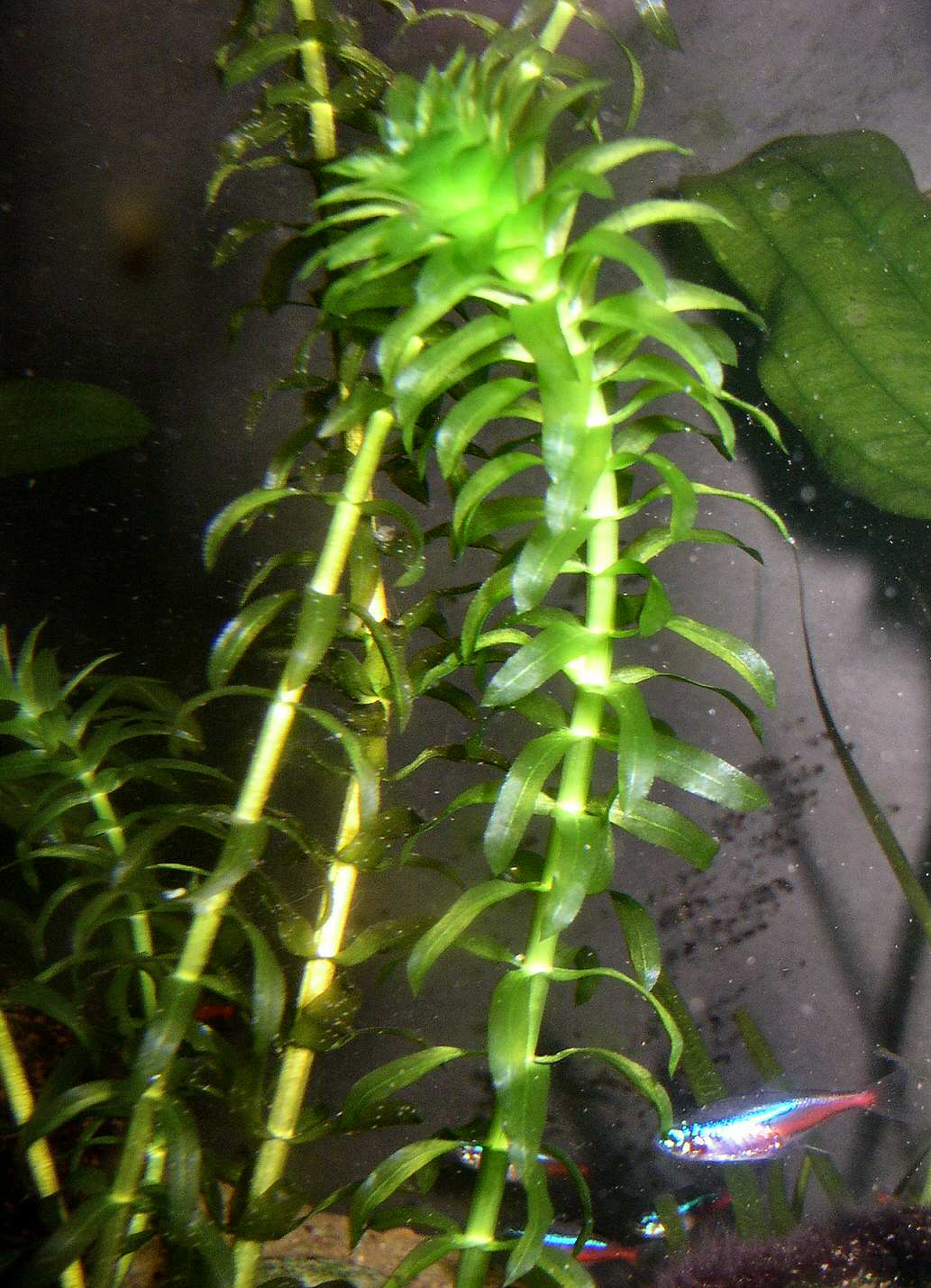
Egeria densa

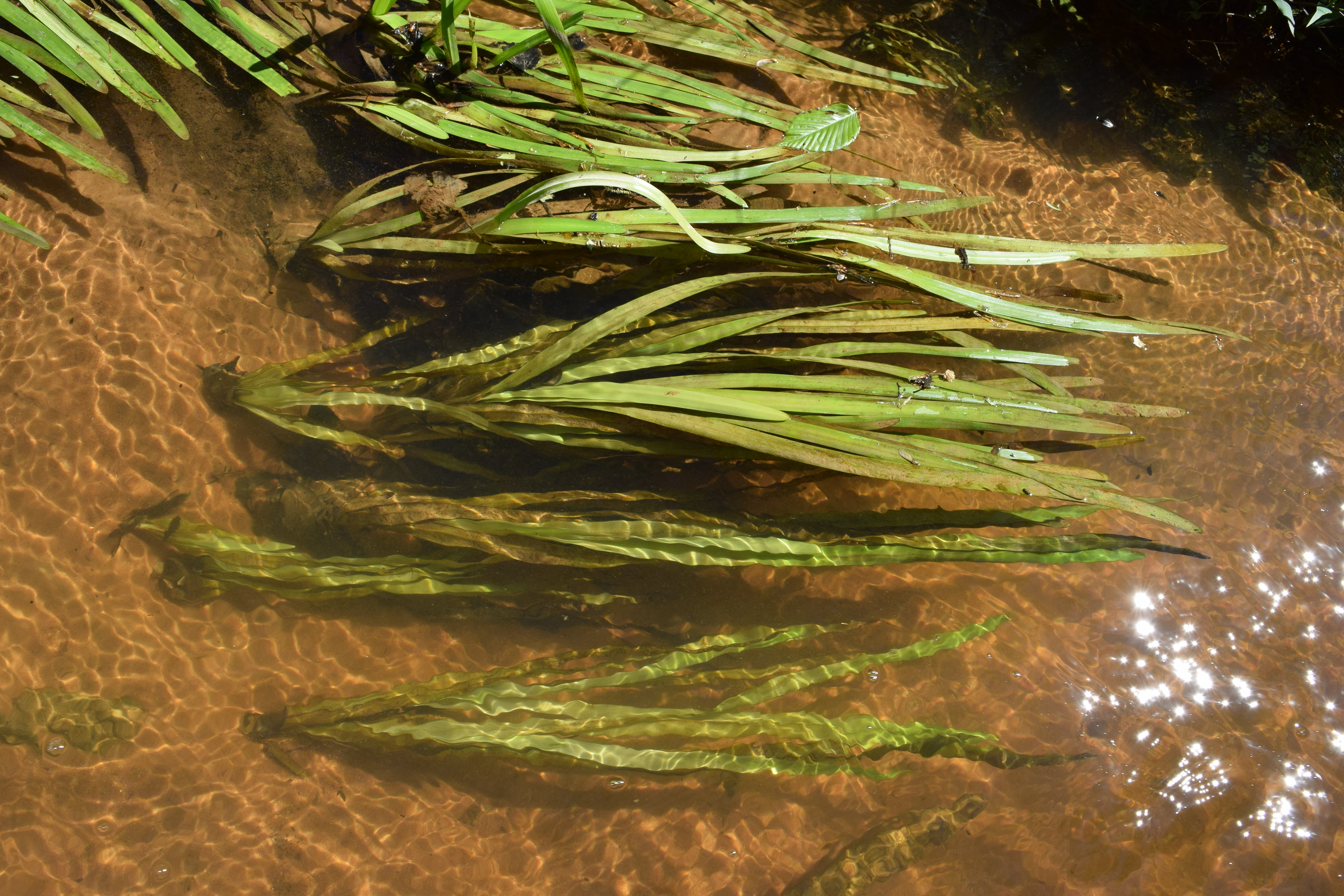
Vallisneria americana

- Cryptocoryne affinis Brown,

== Araliaceae ==
- Hydrocotyle leucocephala Chamisso & Schlechtendal, 1826

== Cabombaceae ==
- Cabomba furcata Schult. & Schult.f., 1830

== Haloragaceae ==
- Myriophyllum mattogrossense Hoenne, 1915

== Primulaceae ==
- Hottonia palustris Linnaeus, 1753

== Hydrocharitaceae ==
- Egeria densa Planchon, 1849
- Elodea canadensis Rich
- Elodea granatensis Rich
- Vallisneria americana Michx

== Lythraceae ==
- Rotala rotundifolia Koehne, 1849

== Menyanthaceae ==
- Nymphoides humboldtiana (Kunth) Kuntze

== Nymphaeaceae ==
- Nymphaea amazonum LINNAEUS
- Nymphaea caerulea ZUCC.
- Nymphaea lotus LINNAEUS
- Nymphaea micranta Guill. & Perr.
- Nymphaea novogranatensis Wiersema
- Victoria amazonica (Poepp.) Klotzsch

== Onagraceae ==
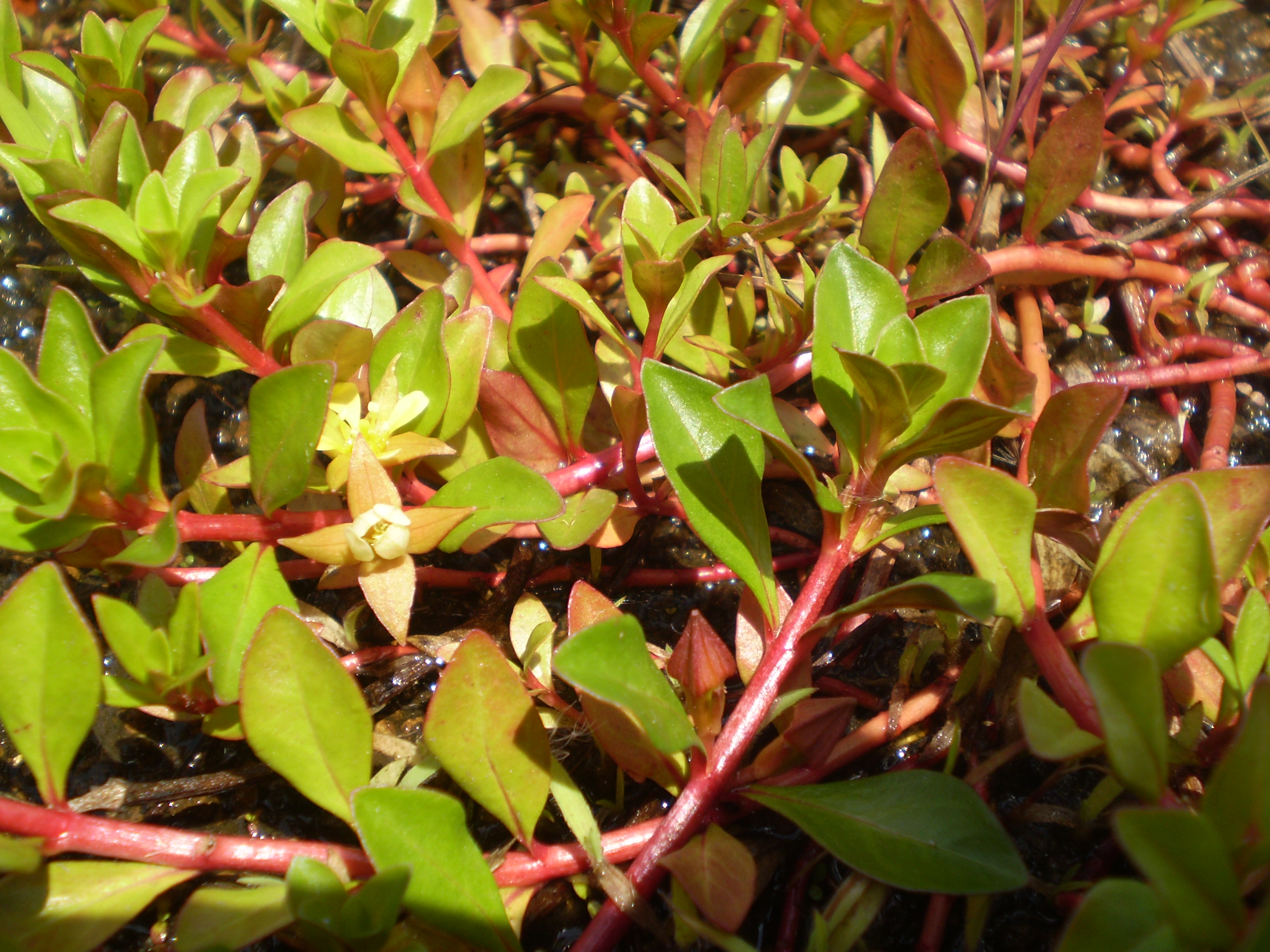
Ludwigia repens

- Ludwigia erecta (L.) Hara
- Ludwigia helmintorrhiza (Mart.) Hara
- Ludwigia inclinata (L.f.) Raven
- Ludwigia octovalvis (Jacq.) Raven
- Ludwigia peploides Raven(H.B.K.)
- Ludwigia repens J.R. Forst, 1849
- Ludwigia sedioides (H.& B.) Hara

== Pteridaceae ==
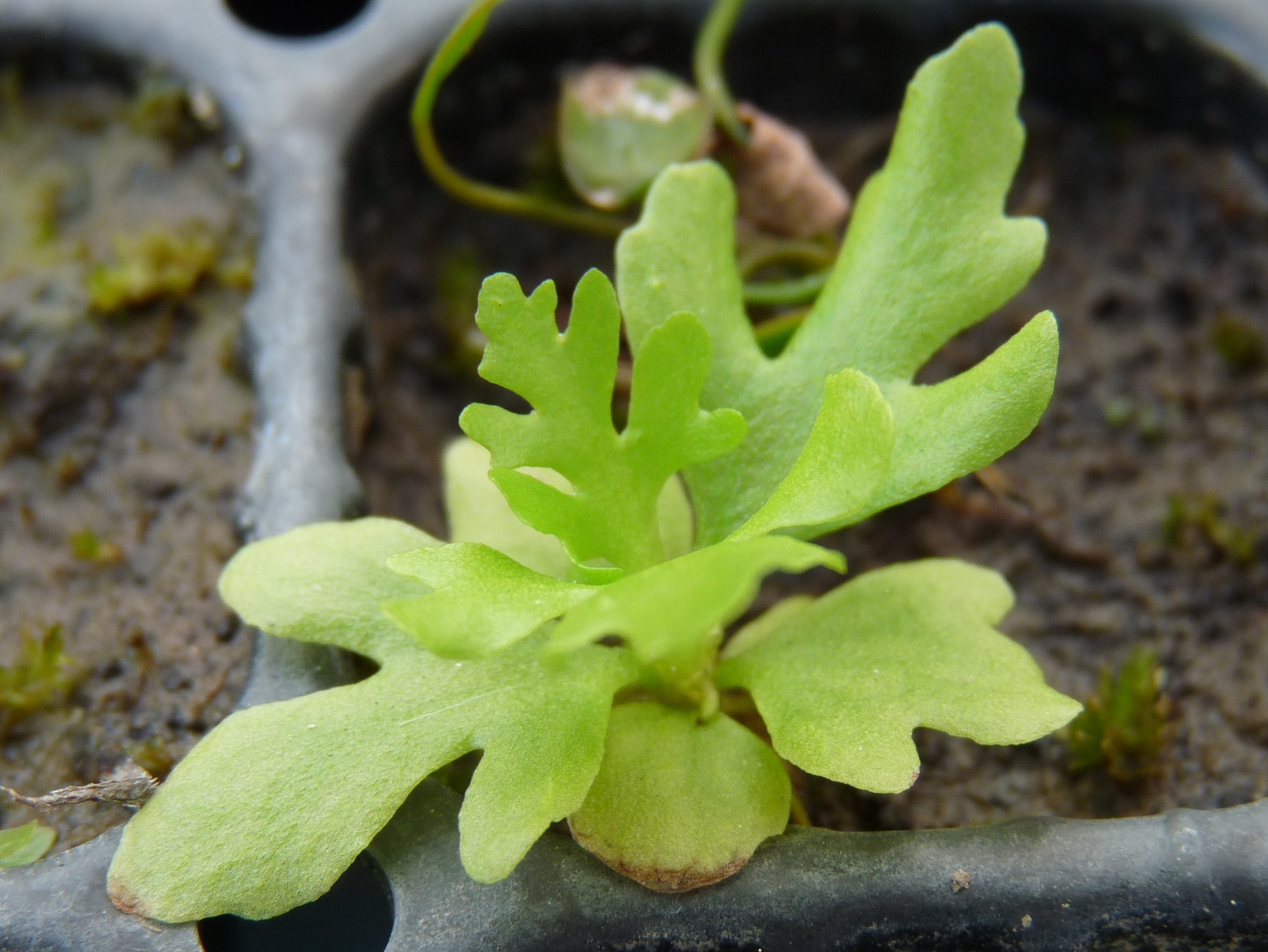
Ceratopteris thalictroides

- Ceratopteris thalictroides Brogniart, 1821

== Plantaginaceae ==
- Bacopa caroliniana B.L. Robins,

== Polypodiaceae ==
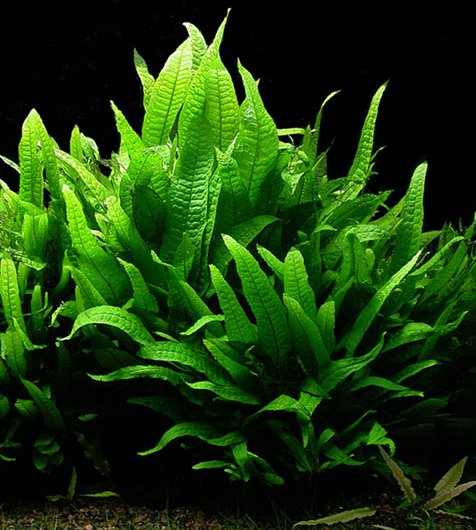
Microsorum pteropus

- Microsorum pteropus Blume, 1933

== Saururaceae ==
- Saururus cernuus Linnaeus

== Scrophulariaceae ==
- Bacopa monnieri Pennell, 1891
