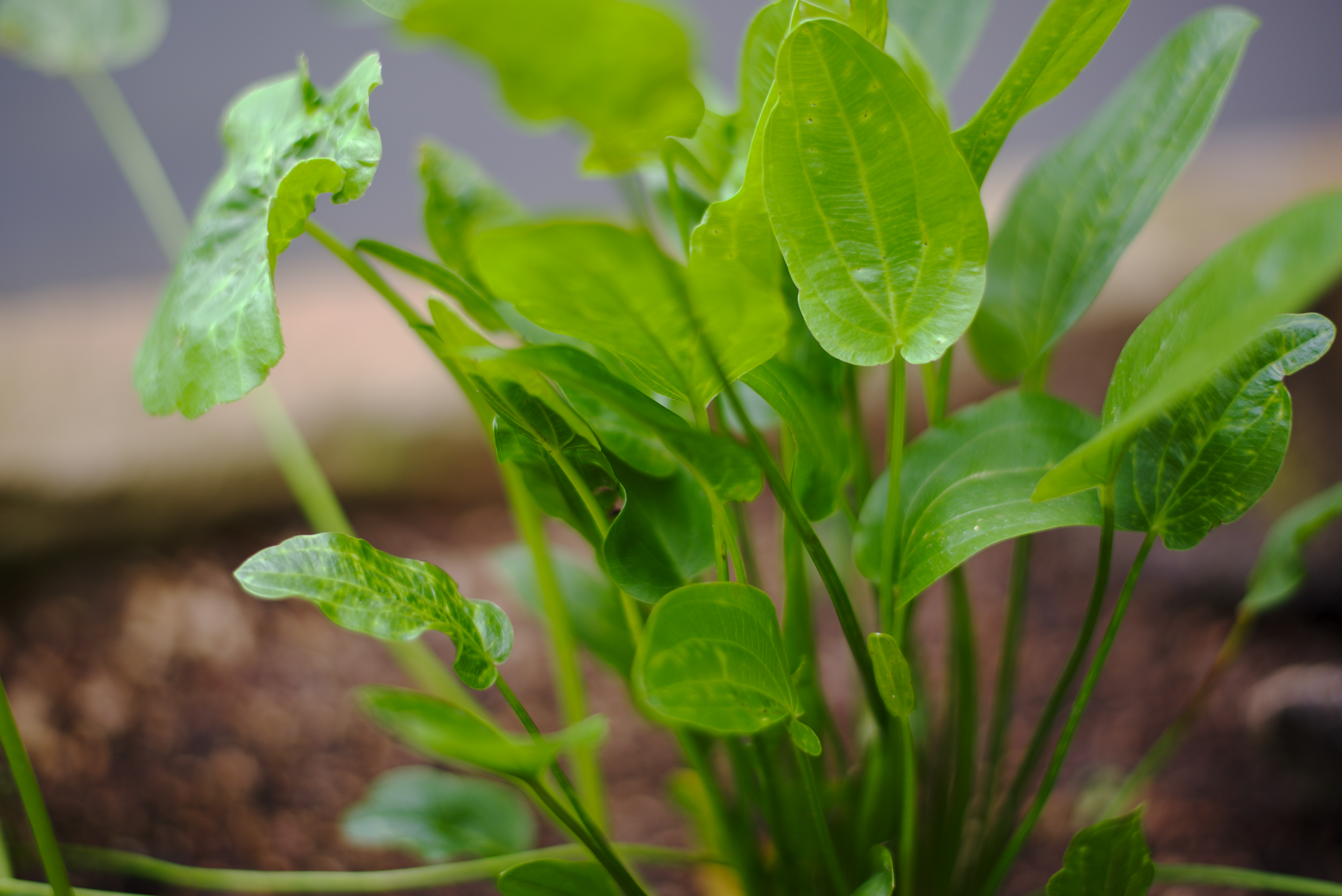

Scientific classification
- Kingdom: Plantae
- Clade: Tracheophytes
- Clade: Angiosperms
- Clade: Monocots
- Order: Alismatales
- Family: Alismataceae
- Genus: Echinodorus
- Species: E. ovalis

Binomial name
- Echinodorus ovalis Wright in Sauvalle Fl. Cub. 564, 1871

= Echinodorus ovalis =

Species of flowering plant

In Rataj's taxonomy Echinodorus ovalis is in Section Cordifolii, Subgenus Echinodorus. It is related to Echinodorus cordifolius and listed by some authorities and importers as a synonym of that species, e.g. E. cordifolius 'ovalis'.

== Description ==
Leaves 40 – 50 cm long, blades ovate or oval, at the tip blunt, at the base decurrent or abrupt, 7.5 – 19 cm long x 3 – 10 cm wide, trimmed with very distinct pellucid lines.

Stem prostrate, 80 – 90 cm long, proliferous. Inflorescence racemose, having 4 - (6) whorls. Bracts shorter than pedicels, 0.8 - 1.5 cm long, shallowly connate, pedicels about 4.5 cm long. Sepals with smooth ribs quite unlike the muricate (warty) ribs of the similar E. cordifolius. Achenes probably with 3 facial glands.

Most specimens seem to have few flowers.

== Distribution ==
It is endemic to Cuba.

== Cultivation ==
Easy to cultivate and suitable for the smaller aquarium. Prefers a moderate to good light and a reasonably rich substrate. The flower stem will root naturally in submersed conditions.
