= Echinodorus bracteatus =

Scientific classification
- Kingdom: Plantae
- Clade: Tracheophytes
- Clade: Angiosperms
- Clade: Monocots
- Order: Alismatales
- Family: Alismataceae
- Genus: Echinodorus
- Species: E. bracteatus

Binomial name
- Echinodorus bracteatus Micheli in DC. Monogr. Phaner. 3:59, 1881

Species of aquatic plant

Echinodorus bracteatus is a species of plants in the Alismataceae. It is native to Costa Rica, Nicaragua, Panama, Colombia and Ecuador.

== Description ==
Leaves 20 – 80 cm long, long-petioled, blades cordate, at base lobate, at tip obtuse or shortly acuminate, 2/3 as broad as long, mostly about 30 cm, but sometimes more than 50 cm long. Pellucid markings in shape of points or short ovals, or absent.

Stem erect, 70 - 150 – 190 cm long, winged. Inflorescence paniculate, having usually 12 - 17 whorls. Bracts distinctly longer than the flowers, connate, 1.5 – 2 cm, exceptionally 6 cm long x 0.5 - 0.8 cm wide, having 25 - 30 ribs.

Flowers sessile or nearly so, having the pedicels only 1 – 2 mm long. Corolla white, usually 2.5 cm in diameter, stamens 20 - 24, anthers as long or broadly shorter as the filaments. Achenes claviform, short-beaked, with 4 - 5 facial ribs and usually 1 facial gland. Glands rarely 2 or absent.

== Cultivation ==
One of the larger Amazon swords. Can grow too large for the average aquarium. Needs a large space, deep, rich substrate and plenty of light. According to reports, it flowers in the summer but doesn't set seed.
