= Leioproctus alismatis =

Scientific classification
- Kingdom: Animalia
- Phylum: Arthropoda
- Clade: Pancrustacea
- Class: Insecta
- Order: Hymenoptera
- Family: Colletidae
- Genus: Leioproctus
- Species: L. alismatis

Binomial name
- Leioproctus alismatis (Ducke, 1908)

Synonyms
- Panurginus alismatis Ducke, 1908; Pasiphae alismatis Ducke, 1908; Protodiscelis alismatis Ducke, 1908

Species of bee

Leioproctus alismatis, also known as Leioproctus (Protodiscelis) alismatis, is a species of bee in the family Colletidae and subfamily Colletinae. It is a solitary bee native to northeastern Brazil. The species was described by German-Brazilian entomologist Adolpho Ducke in 1908.

The species is particularly notable for its close ecological association with aquatic plants of the genus Echinodorus (family Alismataceae). It is described as oligolectic, meaning that females collect pollen from a relatively narrow group of related plants. Studies of the species have documented its specialization on Echinodorus flowers.

== Taxonomy ==
Adolpho Ducke described the species in 1908 as Panurginus alismatis. The original material came from Quixadá, in the state of Ceará, northeastern Brazil. Ducke subsequently treated the species under Pasiphae, a name that was later associated with the colletid bee genus Bicolletes.

Michener subsequently included Protodiscelis within Leioproctus as the subgenus Leioproctus (Protodiscelis). Under this classification the species was known as Leioproctus (Protodiscelis) alismatis.

Later classifications of the American Colletinae continued to associate Protodiscelis with Leioproctus while recognizing the distinctive Neotropical group as Leioproctus (Protodiscelis). Modern taxonomic databases and bee catalogues may therefore differ in whether they present the species under the broader genus Leioproctus or the genus-group name Protodiscelis.

The Integrated Taxonomic Information System currently lists Leioproctus alismatis (Ducke, 1908) as a valid species in the family Colletidae and subfamily Colletinae.

== Description ==
Leioproctus alismatis is a small solitary colletid bee. The species belongs to a group of Neotropical bees characterized by morphological adaptations associated with pollen collection from particular host plants.

Ducke's original material was collected at Quixadá in Ceará. The type material subsequently examined in Brazilian museum collections includes both female and male specimens collected by Ducke on 8 July 1908. The specimens are preserved as type material associated with the original name Pasiphae alismatis.

The female possesses specialized hairs on the hind legs that are particularly suited to collecting the small pollen grains produced by its preferred aquatic plants. These highly plumose setae allow pollen to be retained efficiently during flower visits.

== Distribution and habitat ==
The species is native to Brazil, particularly northeastern Brazil. The type locality is Quixadá, in the state of Ceará.

Records from the Caatinga indicate that the species occurs in areas containing temporary or permanent bodies of water where its host plants occur. Surveys have recorded Protodiscelis alismatis at numerous flooded sites in the Caatinga region.

The species' distribution is therefore closely associated with the occurrence of its host plants rather than with dry terrestrial vegetation alone.

== Behaviour and ecology ==
=== Pollen collection ===
Leioproctus alismatis is an oligolectic bee. Females have been recorded collecting pollen primarily from species of Echinodorus, aquatic flowering plants in the family Alismataceae.

The association is particularly strong. Studies in the Brazilian Caatinga found that the bees were common at sites containing flowering Echinodorus and that the species accounted for a large proportion of visits to the flowers of its host plants.

The specialized relationship between the bee and its host plants is reflected in the morphology of the female. The extremely plumose hairs used for pollen collection are adapted to retaining the relatively small pollen grains of Echinodorus.

=== Pollination ===
The species is an important pollinator of Echinodorus plants in parts of northeastern Brazil. Field studies have recorded P. alismatis as the principal visitor to several species of Echinodorus occurring in the Caatinga.

Its specialized relationship with aquatic plants is unusual among bees, because suitable forage is often concentrated around temporary or permanent ponds and flooded areas within the otherwise relatively dry Caatinga landscape.

=== Flower visitation ===
Protodiscelis alismatis has been recorded visiting flowers of Echinodorus species, including Echinodorus palaefolius. Research into floral scent has investigated whether chemical compounds released by the flowers attract the specialized bees. The available evidence indicates a highly specific bee–plant interaction rather than a generalized attraction to the floral compounds tested.

== Type material ==
Ducke's type material was collected at Quixadá, Ceará, Brazil, on 8 July 1908. Museum records list both female and male specimens bearing labels referring to Pasiphae alismatis Ducke.

The type material has subsequently been associated with Protodiscelis and is held in Brazilian museum collections. A catalogue of bee type specimens records the specimens as paralectotypes and gives the current combination as Protodiscelis alismatis (Ducke, 1908).
