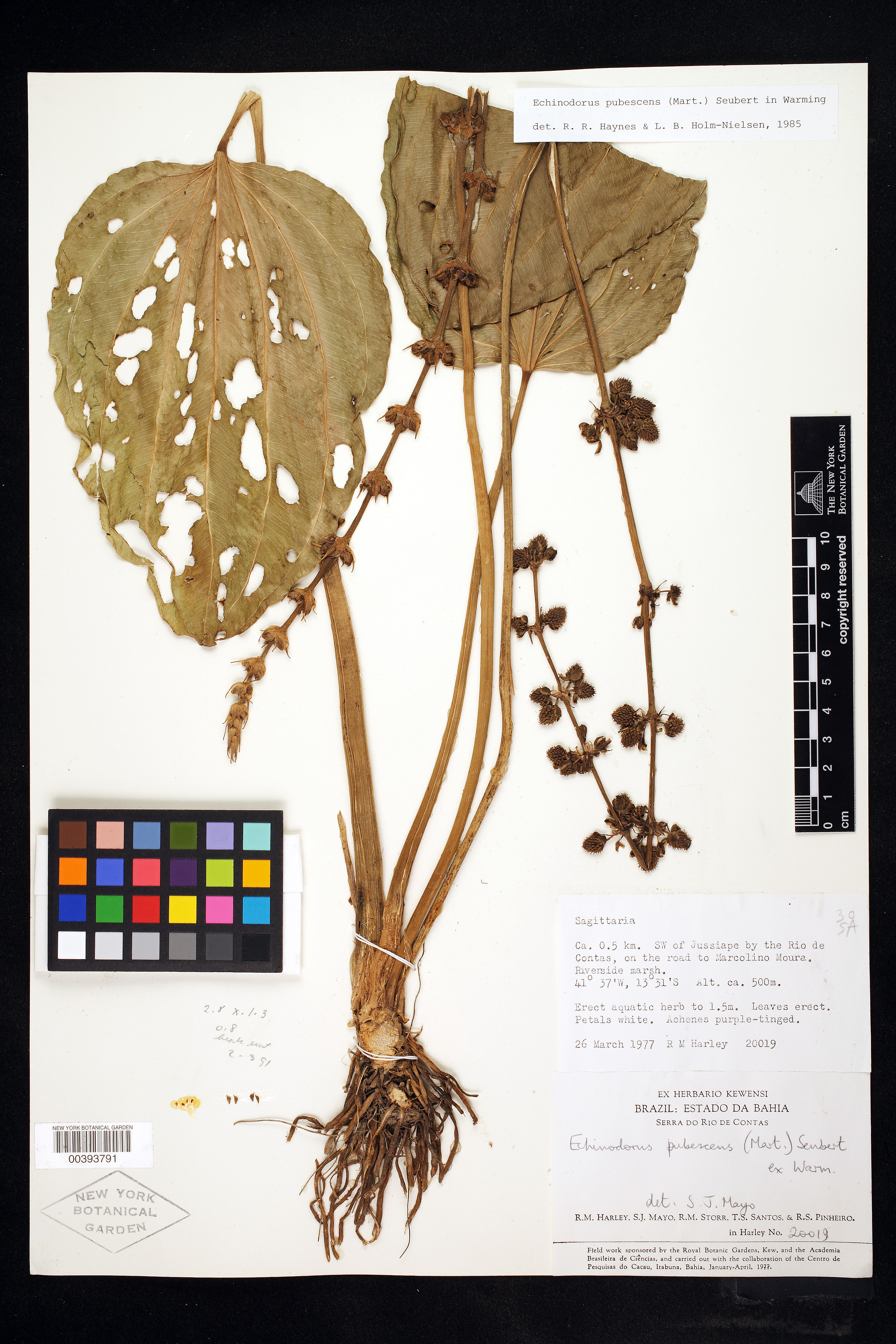

Scientific classification
- Kingdom: Plantae
- Clade: Tracheophytes
- Clade: Angiosperms
- Clade: Monocots
- Order: Alismatales
- Family: Alismataceae
- Genus: Echinodorus
- Species: E. pubescens

Binomial name
- Echinodorus pubescens (Mart. ex Schult.f.) Seub. ex Warm.

Synonyms
- Alisma pubescens Mart. ex Schult.f.; Echinodorus macrocarpus Rataj

= Echinodorus pubescens =

Species of flowering plant

Echinodorus pubescens is a species of aquatic plant in the family Alismataceae. Rataj places it in his section Paniculati – subgenus Echinodorus.

Note: described and known from only one specimen. Almost certainly not in cultivation.

== Distribution ==
It is endemic to Brazil.
