= Echinodorus reptilis =

Scientific classification
- Kingdom: Plantae
- Clade: Tracheophytes
- Clade: Angiosperms
- Clade: Monocots
- Order: Alismatales
- Family: Alismataceae
- Genus: Echinodorus
- Species: E. reptilis

Binomial name
- Echinodorus reptilis Lehtonen

Species of aquatic plant

Echinodorus reptilis is a species of plant in the Alismataceae from South America.
