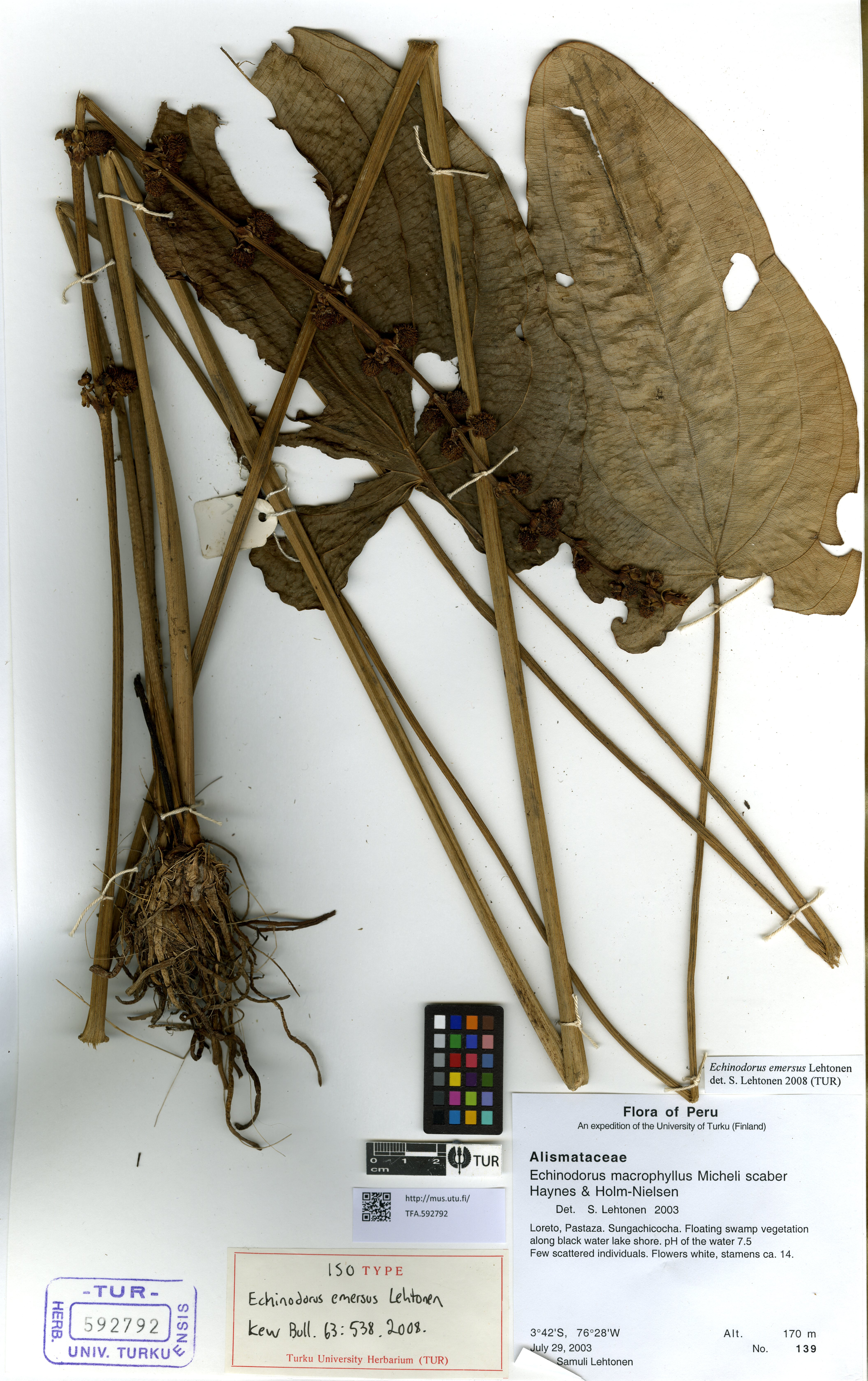

Scientific classification
- Kingdom: Plantae
- Clade: Tracheophytes
- Clade: Angiosperms
- Clade: Monocots
- Order: Alismatales
- Family: Alismataceae
- Genus: Echinodorus
- Species: E. emersus

Binomial name
- Echinodorus emersus Lehtonen

= Echinodorus emersus =

Species of aquatic plant

Echinodorus emersus is a species of plant in the family Alismataceae from South America.
