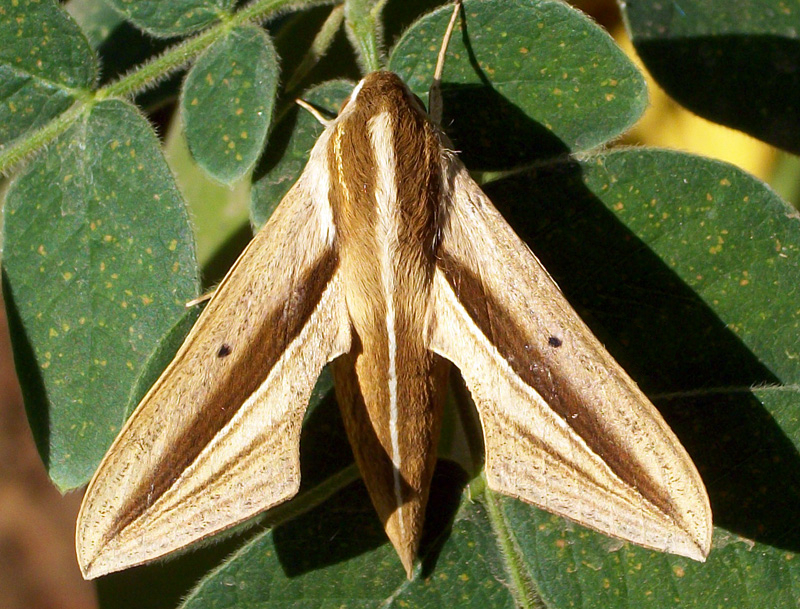

Scientific classification
- Kingdom: Animalia
- Phylum: Arthropoda
- Class: Insecta
- Order: Lepidoptera
- Family: Sphingidae
- Genus: Theretra
- Species: T. silhetensis

Binomial name
- Theretra silhetensis (Walker, 1856)

Synonyms
- Chaerocampa silhetensis Walker, 1856; Chaerocampa silhetensis Schaufuss, 1870; Chaerocampa bisecta Moore, 1858; Chaerocampa silhetensis intersecta Butler, 1876; Theretra silhetensis aquila Lachlan & Moulds, 1996

= Theretra silhetensis =

Species of moth

Theretra silhetensis, the brown-banded hunter hawkmoth, is a moth of the family Sphingidae described by Francis Walker in 1856. It lives in Indo-Australia, India, Sri Lanka, Papua New Guinea, East Australia, Solomon Islands, Fiji Islands, Vanuatu Islands.

== Description ==
The wingspan is 60–72 mm. Not to be confused with Theretra oldenlandiae in being very much paler in color and with a white line down the center of the abdomen. The forewing has a silvery line beyond the oblique brown band. Other parts are ochreous. Larvae are exceedingly variable, from yellow green and green to brown or greyish black ones. But the commonly found color of larva is green with a reddish-brown dorsal area. There is a subdorsal paler line with equal-sized ocelli from 4th to 10th somites with green center. The horn is reddish brown as well.

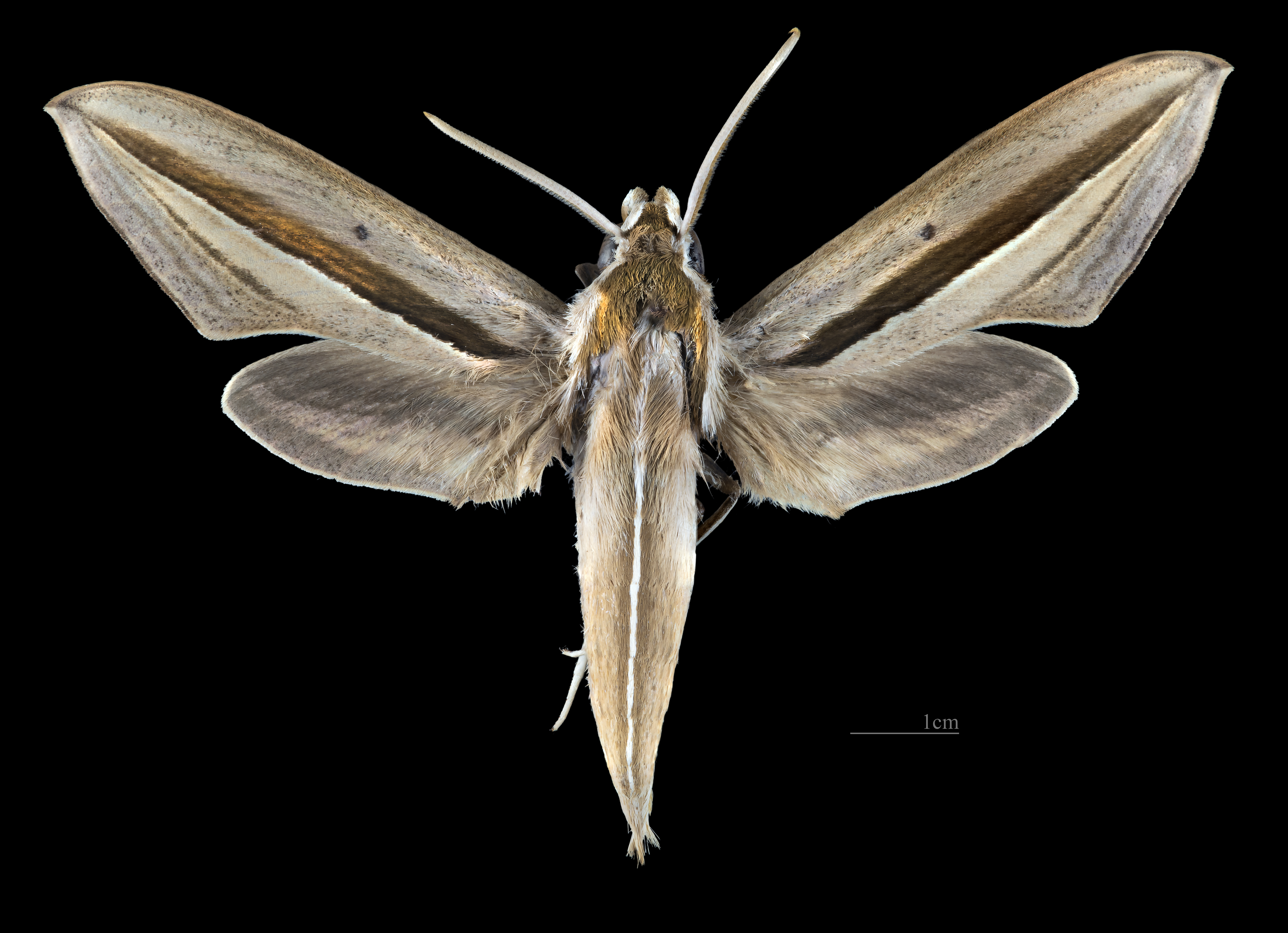
Male dorsal

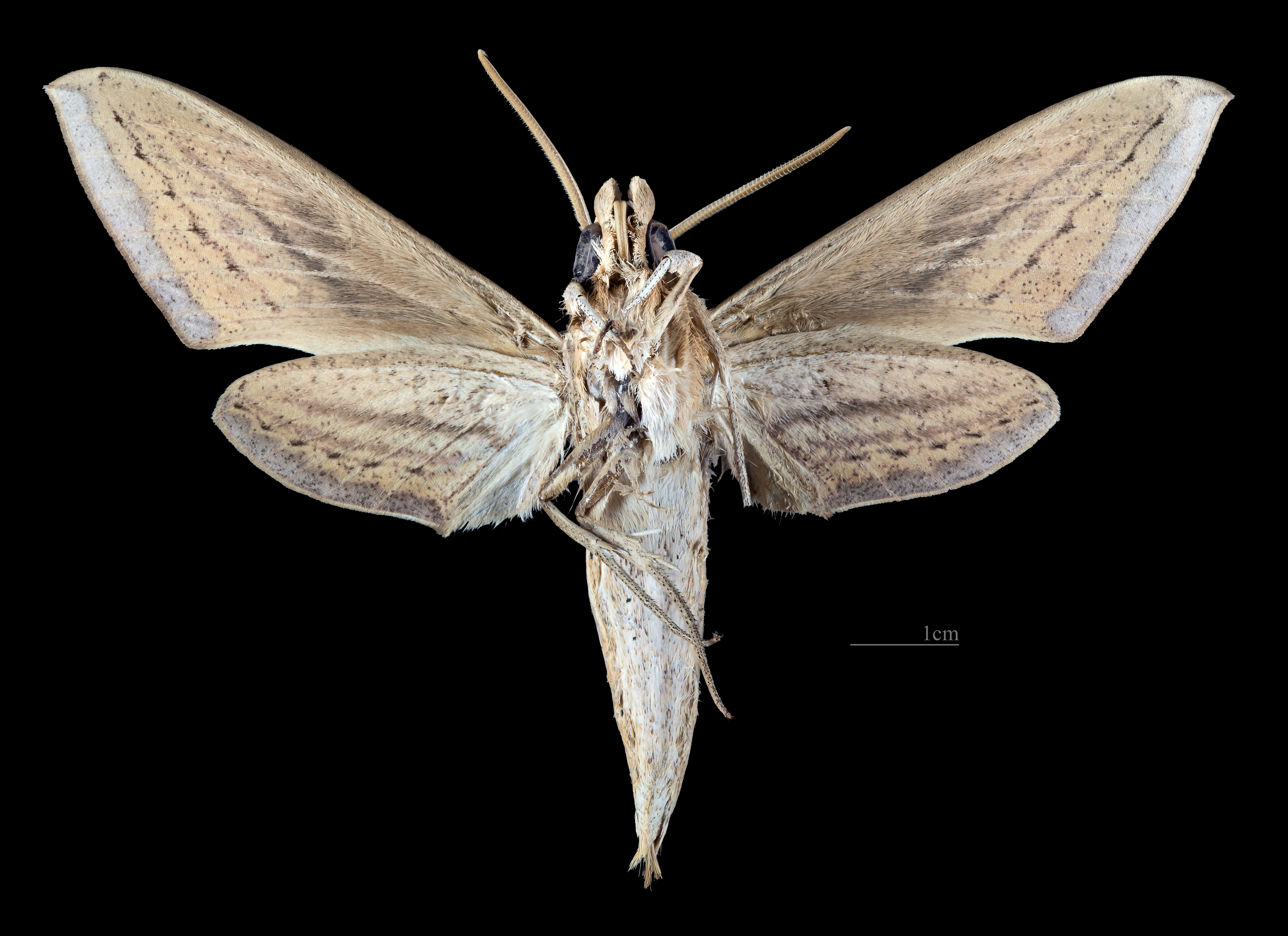
Male ventral

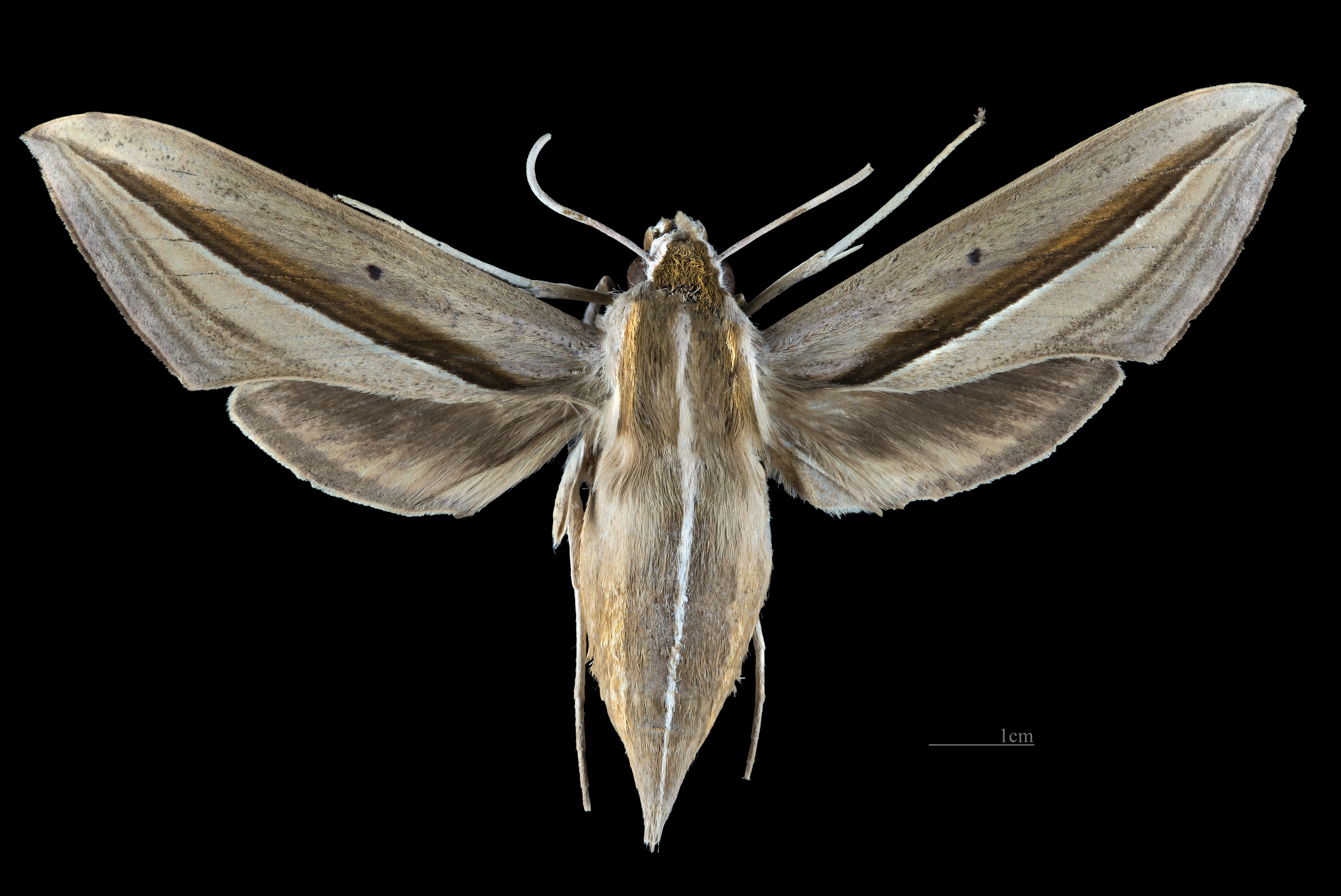
Female dorsal

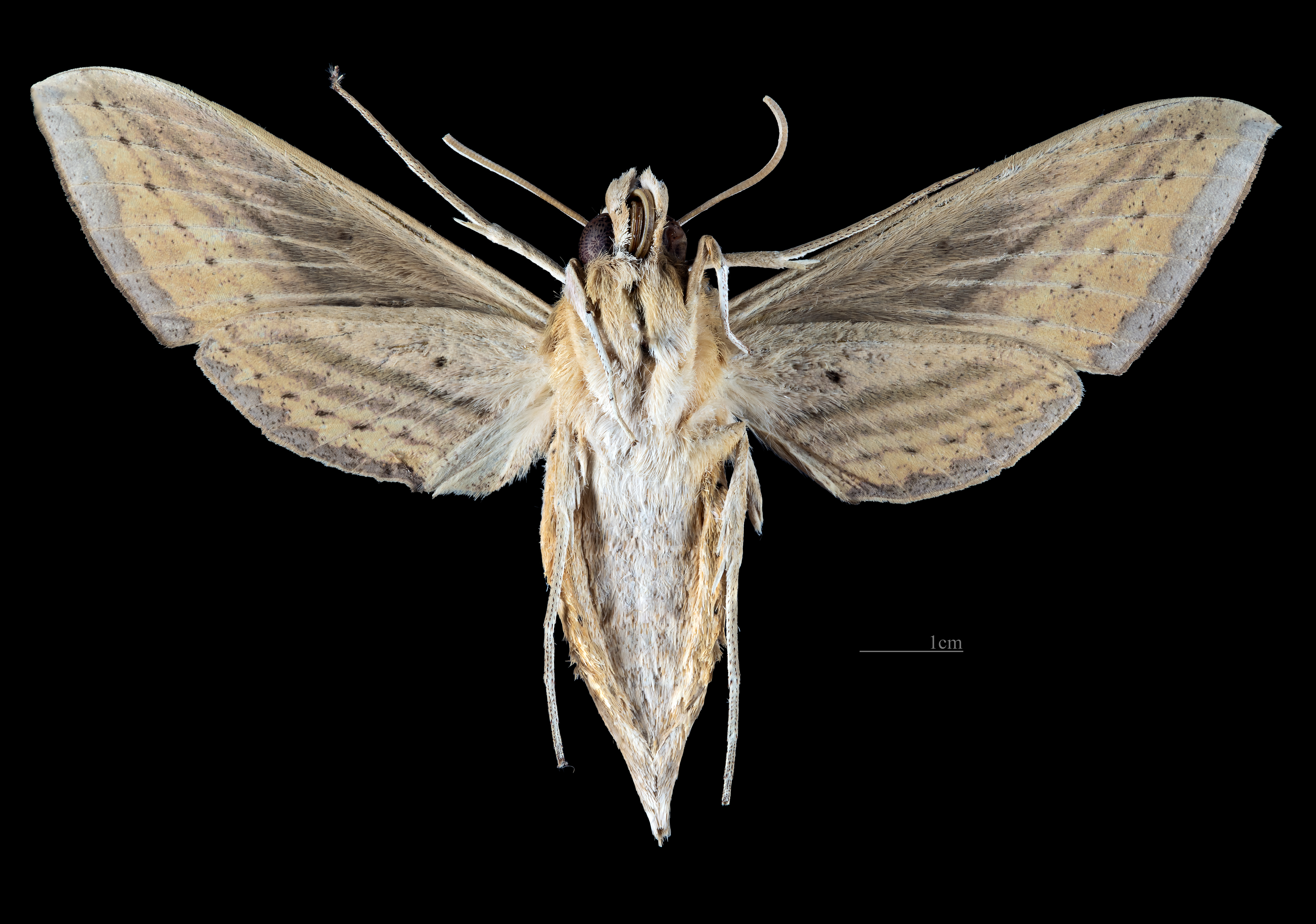
Female ventral

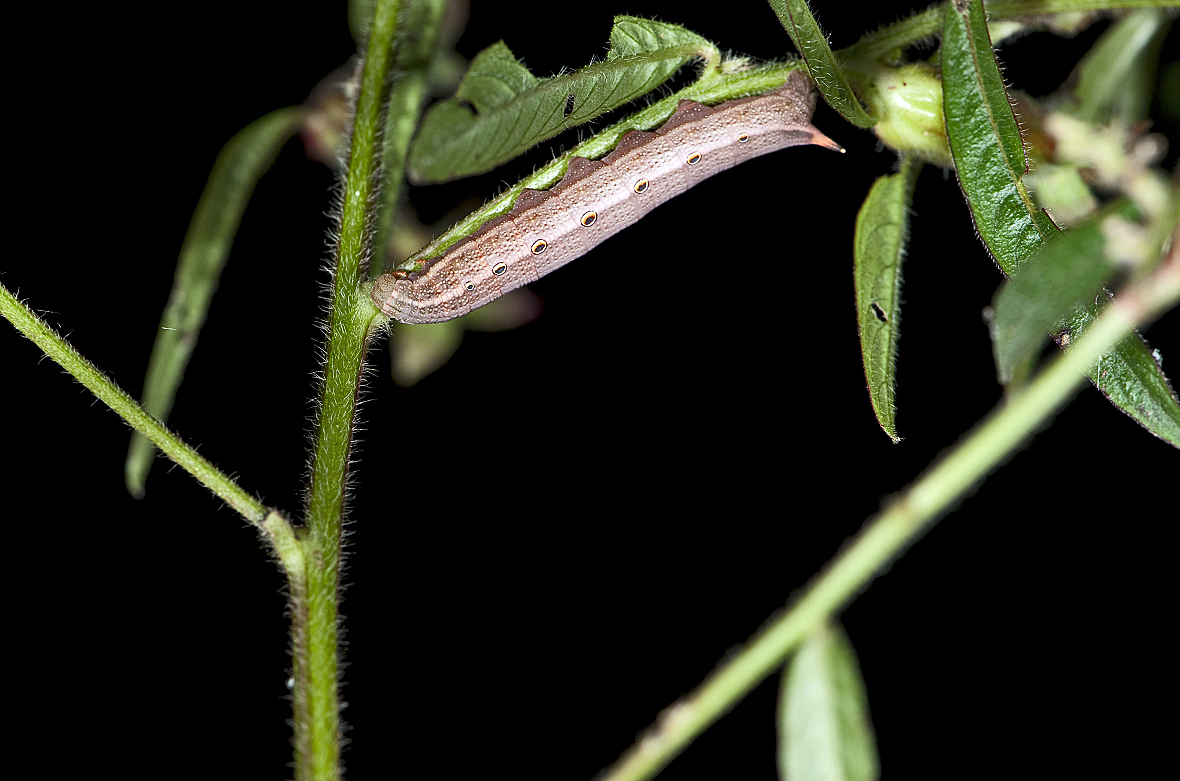
Larva

== Ecology ==
Larvae have been recorded feeding on Colocasia antiquorum and Ludwigia species in southern China, Colocasia esculenta in Japan, Ludwigia repens and Boerhavia species in India and numerous other host plants from elsewhere, including Arum, Caladium, Pistia, Kochia, Ipomoea, Boerhavia, Ludwigia, Rosa and Trapa species.

== Subspecies ==
- Theretra silhetensis silhetensis (Sri Lanka and southern India as a disjunct population. Northern India, Nepal, Bangladesh, Myanmar, the Andaman Islands, Thailand, eastern and southern China, Taiwan, central and southern Japan, Malaysia (Peninsular, Sarawak), Indonesia (Sumatra, Java, Kalimantan) and Vietnam)
- Theretra silhetensis intersecta (Butler, 1876) (from the Philippines south through eastern Indonesia to the Solomon Islands and eastern Australia)
