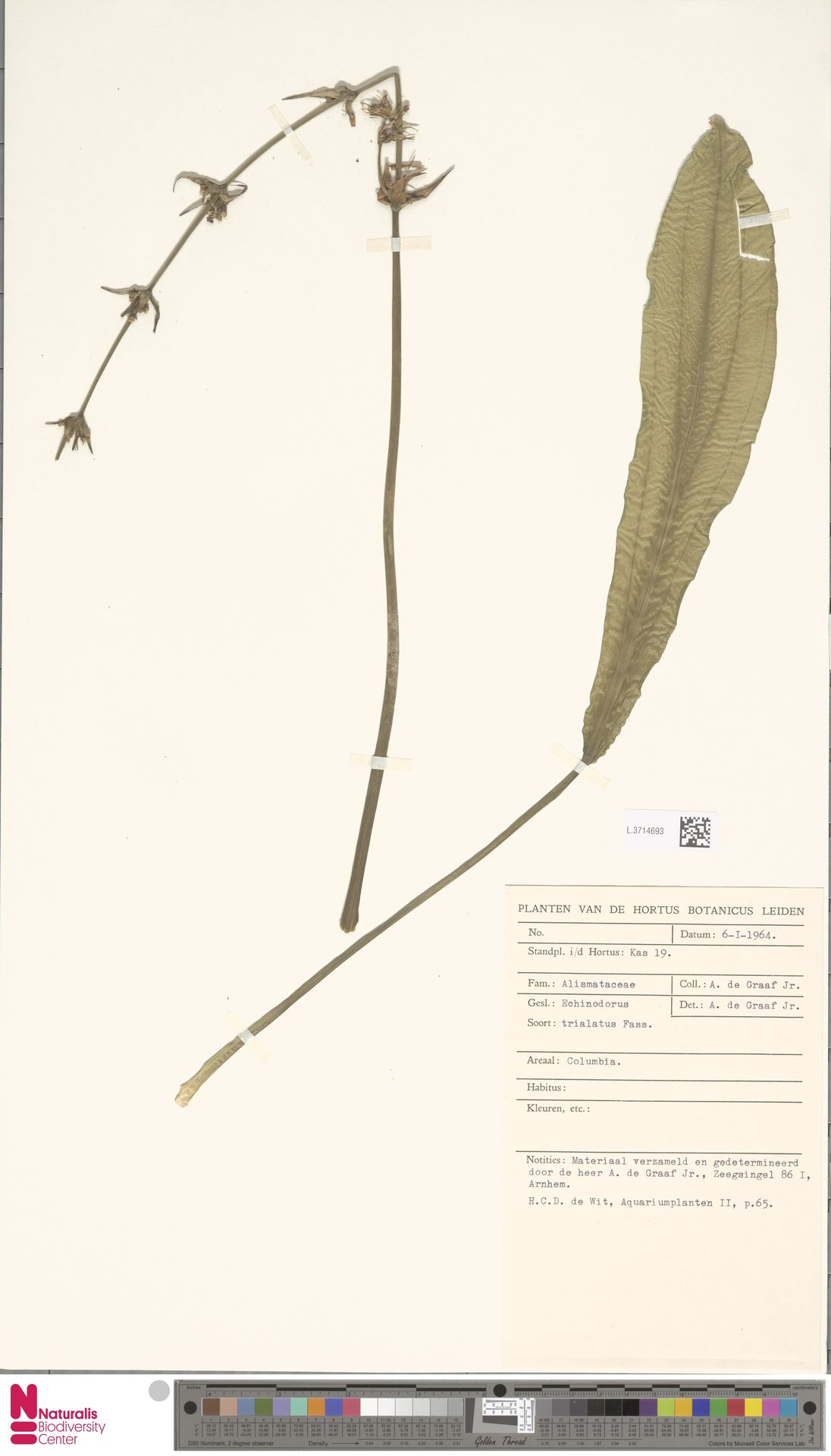

Scientific classification
- Kingdom: Plantae
- Clade: Embryophytes
- Clade: Tracheophytes
- Clade: Angiosperms
- Clade: Monocots
- Order: Alismatales
- Family: Alismataceae
- Genus: Echinodorus
- Species: E. trialatus

Binomial name
- Echinodorus trialatus Fassett in Rhodora 57, 179, 1955

= Echinodorus trialatus =

Species of flowering plant

Echinodorus trialatus is a type of plant, a freshwater macrophyte, a monocot indigenous to South America, and is synonymous with Aquarius trialatus. In Rataj's taxonomy, E. trialatus is in Section Paniculati, Subgenus Echinodorus.

== Description ==
Leaves with blades about as long as the winged petioles and tapering into them, long tapered at the tip, with the upper pair of veins parallel to the midrib and leaving it at some distance from the base, 30–45 cm (12–18 in) long. Blades longly oval, on both ends regularly narrowed, or lanceolate with 3–5 veins, without pellucid markings, 17–25 cm (7–10 in) long by 2.5–5 cm (0.98–1.97 in) wide.

Stem erect, along the whole length distinctly alate (three-winged), 30–70 cm (12–28 in) long. Inflorescence usually racemose, rarely branched in the lower whorl, having 6–13 whorls. Bracts longer than the pedicels with flowers, 1.5–2 cm (1–1 in) long having 19–21 distinct ribs. Flowers sessile or subsessile on pedicels 2–4 mm (0.079–0.157 in) long. Sepals about 5 mm long, with usually 18 ribs, corolla white. Aggregate fruit globular, 5–7 mm (0.20–0.28 in) in diameter. Stamens usually 18, anthers 1.5 mm (0.059 in) long, as long as the filaments. Achenes 2.5–3 mm (0.098–0.118 in) long by 1–1.2 mm (0.039–0.047 in) wide, distinctly ribbed only in the lower part of the body, the upper third without ribs, lateral glands absent.

== Distribution ==
This plant is in Panama, Colombia & Venezuela, normally growing submersed.
