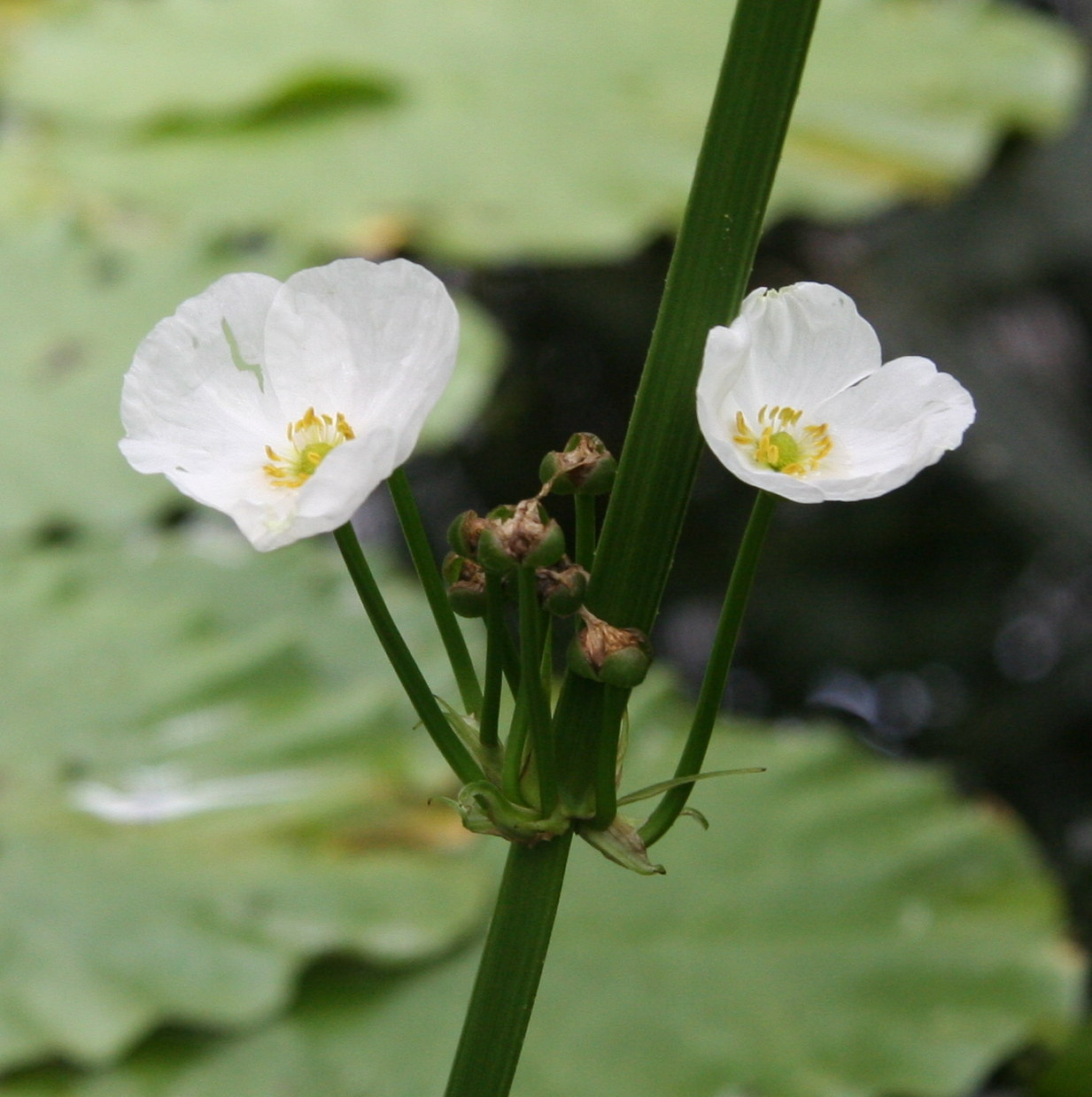

Scientific classification
- Kingdom: Plantae
- Clade: Tracheophytes
- Clade: Angiosperms
- Clade: Monocots
- Order: Alismatales
- Family: Alismataceae
- Genus: Echinodorus
- Species: E. subalatus

Binomial name
- Echinodorus subalatus (Mart.) Griseb.

Synonyms
- Alisma subalatum Mart. ex Schult.f. in J.J.Roemer & J.A.Schultes; Sagittaria palifolia var. subalata (Mart. ex Schult.f.) Kuntze; Alisma intermedium Mart. ex Schult.f. in J.J.Roemer & J.A.Schultes; Alisma subalatum var. majus Schult.f. in J.J.Roemer & J.A.Schultes; Alisma subalatum var. medium Schult.f. in J.J.Roemer & J.A.Schultes; Alisma subalatum var. minus Schult.f. in J.J.Roemer & J.A.Schultes; Echinodorus intermedius (Mart. ex Schult.f.) Griseb; Echinodorus ellipticus var. ovatus Micheli in A.L.P.de Candolle & A.C.P.de Candolle; Echinodorus martii Micheli in A.L.P.de Candolle & A.C.P.de Candolle; Echinodorus longistylus Buchenau in H.G.A.Engler; Echinodorus andrieuxii (Hook. & Arn.) Small in N.L.Britton & al.; Echinodorus subalatus var. minor F.J.Mey.; Echinodorus andrieuxii var. longistylus (Buchenau) Rataj; Echinodorus subalatus subsp. andrieuxii (Hook. & Arn.) R.R.Haynes & Holm-Niels.

= Echinodorus subalatus =

Species of aquatic plant

Echinodorus subalatus is a species of aquatic plants in the Alismataceae. It is native to Cuba, Mexico, Central America, Guyana, Venezuela, Bolivia, Brazil and Paraguay. It is found naturally growing in mud by the side of streams.

== Description ==
Leaves with canaliculate petioles, blades lanceolate, narrowly to broadly ovate, sharp on the tip, decumbent or rarely abrupt on the base, 18 – 24 cm long x 2 – 9 cm wide, with terrestrial forms usually only 10 x 2 cm having 5 - 7 veins and distinct pellucid lines.

Stem below cylindrical, between whorls triangular in cross-section, often alate, 35 – 120 cm long. Inflorescence racemose or paniculate having 4 - 15 whorls. Bracts on base connate, longer than the pedicels (up to 3.5 cm). Pedicels 0.5 – 2 cm long. Sepals 4 – 6 mm long, petals about twice as long, the diameter of the corolla 1.2 - 1.5 cm. Usually 12 stamens, achenes 2 x 1.5 mm with one, rarely 2 glands separated by a rib. Stylar beak bent back - reaching usually 1/4 of the body.

Vegetatively, resembles E. andrieuxii, nut differs by having distinct pellucid lines, a usually paniculate inflorescence and by achenes with beaks that are at most 1/3 as long as the body.

== Cultivation ==
Deep, rich growing substrate and a good light. Will grow submersed or emersed. Benefits from additional CO_{2}.
