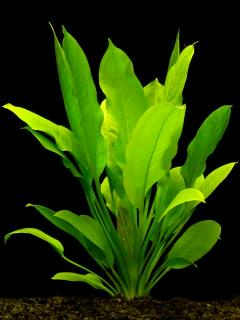
- Echinodorus grisebachii. The plant is cultivated for and used in freshwater aquariums. The species is native to the Amazon Basin.

Scientific classification
- Kingdom: Plantae
- Clade: Tracheophytes
- Clade: Angiosperms
- Clade: Monocots
- Order: Alismatales
- Family: Alismataceae
- Genus: Echinodorus
- Species: E. grisebachii

Binomial name
- Echinodorus grisebachii Small in N.L.Britton & al.

Synonyms
- Echinodorus amphibius Rataj; Echinodorus gracilis Rataj; Echinodorus amazonicus Rataj; Echinodorus bleherae Rataj; Echinodorus bleheri Rataj, common misspelling of E. bleherae; Echinodorus parviflorus Rataj; Echinodorus eglandulosus Holm-Niels. & R.R.Haynes; Echinodorus grisebachii var. minor Kasselm.

= Echinodorus grisebachii =

Amazon sword plant

Species of plant

Echinodorus grisebachii or Echinodorus amazonicus is commonly known as Amazon sword plant, although other plants are also known under this common name. The aquatic plant is cultivated for and used in ponds and artificial aquatic habitats. It is native to Cuba, Central America, and South America as far south as Brazil and Bolivia. It has been sold under the name Paniculatus.

== Description ==
An aquatic plant with submergent leaves 40–60 cm long attached by petioles flatly triangular. Leaf blades are lanceolate or narrowly oval.

There are a number of cultivated forms in the trade with various names such as "Black" or "Parviflorus".
