= Aquarius (plant) =

Scientific classification
- Kingdom: Plantae
- Clade: Tracheophytes
- Clade: Angiosperms
- Clade: Monocots
- Order: Alismatales
- Family: Alismataceae
- Genus: Aquarius (plant); Christenh. & Byng

Species
- 26; see text

Genus of flowering plants

Aquarius is a genus of flowering plants in the family Alismataceae. It includes 26 species native to the Americas, ranging from the central and southeastern United States through Mexico, Central America, the Caribbean, and tropical and subtropical South America to northern Argentina and southern Chile.

== Species ==
26 species are accepted.

- Aquarius bracteatus (Micheli) Christenh. & Byng
- Aquarius cordifolius (L.) Christenh. & Byng
- Aquarius cylindricus (Rataj) Christenh. & Byng
- Aquarius decumbens (Kasselm.) Christenh. & Byng
- Aquarius densinervis (Somogyi) Christenh. & Byng
- Aquarius emersus (Lehtonen) Christenh. & Byng
- Aquarius floribundus (Seub.) Christenh. & Byng
- Aquarius glaucus (Rataj) Christenh. & Byng
- Aquarius grandiflorus (Cham. & Schltdl.) Christenh. & Byng
- Aquarius grisebachii (Small) Christenh. & Byng
- Aquarius horizontalis (Rataj) Christenh. & Byng
- Aquarius inpai (Rataj) Christenh. & Byng
- Aquarius lanceolatus (Rataj) Christenh. & Byng
- Aquarius longipetalus (Micheli) Christenh. & Byng
- Aquarius longiscapus (Arechav.) Christenh. & Byng
- Aquarius macrophyllus (Kunth) Christenh. & Byng
- Aquarius major (Micheli) Christenh. & Byng
- Aquarius palifolius (Nees & Mart.) Christenh. & Byng
- Aquarius paniculatus (Micheli) Christenh. & Byng
- Aquarius pubescens (Mart. ex Schult.f.) Christenh. & Byng
- Aquarius reptilis (Lehtonen) Christenh. & Byng
- Aquarius scaber (Rataj) Christenh. & Byng
- Aquarius subalatus (Mart. ex Schult.f.) Christenh. & Byng
- Aquarius trialatus (Fassett) Christenh. & Byng
- Aquarius tunicatus (Small) Christenh. & Byng
- Aquarius uruguayensis (Arechav.) Christenh. & Byng
