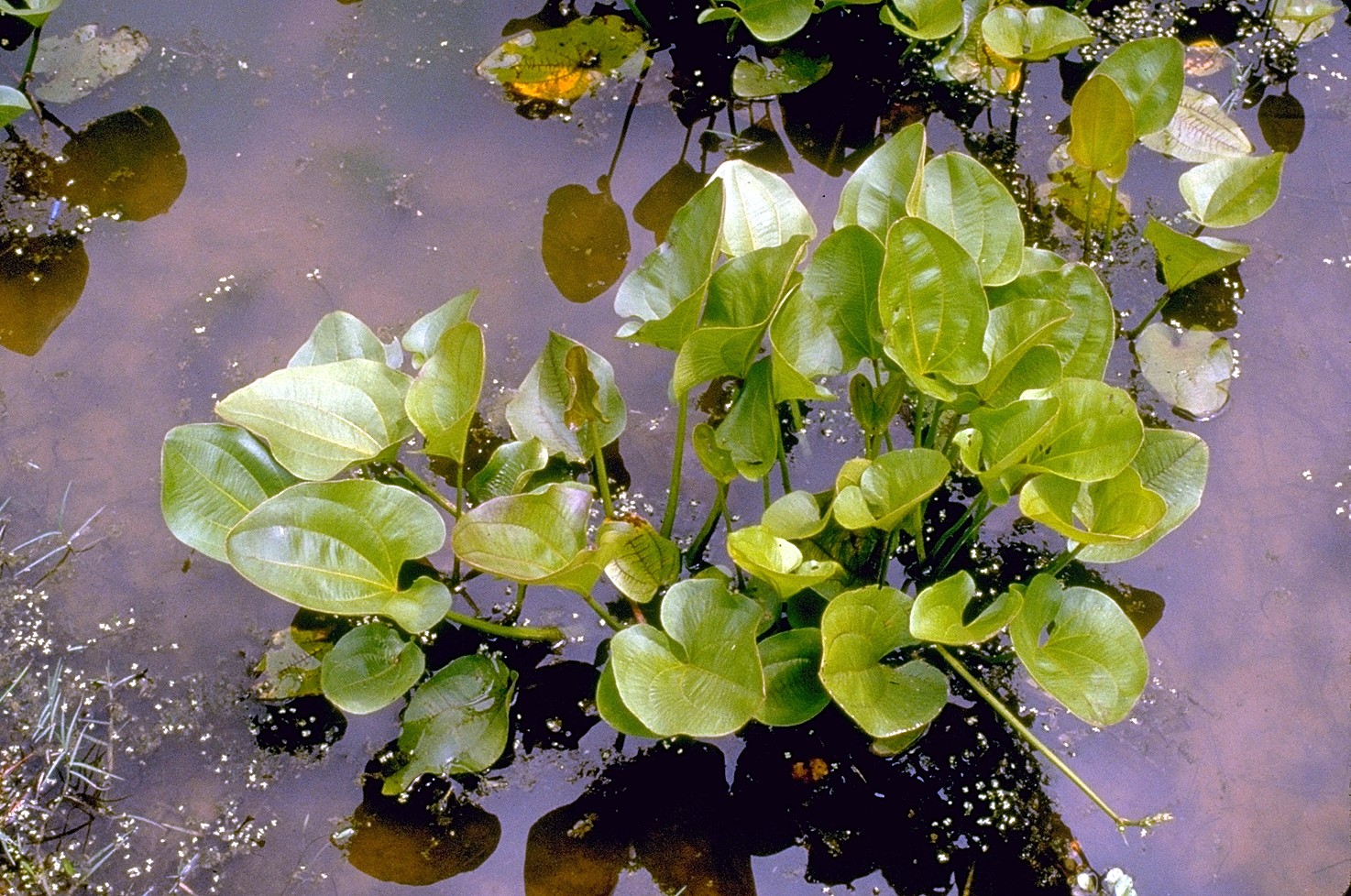

Conservation status
- Secure (NatureServe)

Scientific classification
- Kingdom: Plantae
- Clade: Tracheophytes
- Clade: Angiosperms
- Clade: Monocots
- Order: Alismatales
- Family: Alismataceae
- Genus: Aquarius
- Species: A. cordifolius

Binomial name
- Aquarius cordifolius (L.) Christenh. & Byng

Synonyms
- Echinodorus cordifolius (L.) Griseb.; Echinodorus radicans (Nuttall) Engelmann; Damasonium cordifolium (L.) Chaz.; Sagittaria cordifolia (L.) Lam.; Alisma cordifolia L.

= Aquarius cordifolius =

Species of aquatic plant

Aquarius cordifolius (formerly Echinodorus cordifolius), the spade-leaf sword or creeping burhead, is a species of aquatic plants in the Alismatales. It is native to Mexico, the West Indies, Central America, South America (as far south as Paraguay) and the southeastern United States (Texas to Florida and as far north as Iowa).

== Ecological aspects ==
It is found in marshes, swamps, ditches and ponds. It blooms from spring to fall.

== Description ==
Herbs, perennial, stout, to 100 cm (39 in); rhizomes present. Leaves emersed, submersed leaves mostly absent; petiole 5–6-ridged, 17.5–45 cm (6.9–17.7 in); blade with translucent markings distinct lines, ovate to elliptic, 6.5–32 ´ 2.5–19.1 cm, base truncate to cordate. Inflorescences racemes, of 3–9 whorls, each 3–15-flowered, decumbent to arching, to 62 ´ 8–18 cm, often proliferating; peduncles terete, 35–56 cm (14–22 in); rachis triangular; bracts distinct, subulate, 10–21 mm (0.39–0.83 in), coarse, margins coarse; pedicels erect to ascending, 2.1–7.5 cm (0.83–2.95 in). Flowers to 25 mm (1 in) wide; sepals spreading, 10–12-veined, veins papillate; petals not clawed; stamens 22; anthers versatile; pistils 200–250. Fruits oblanceolate, plump, 3–4-ribbed, abaxially 1-keeled, 2–3.5 ´ 0.9–1.5 mm; glands 3–4; beak terminal, 1–1.3 mm. 2n = 22.

Echinodorus cordifolius is very easily recognized, as it is the only species with arching to decumbent inflorescences. In addition, it is the only one with papillate veins on the sepals.

== Cultivation ==
Easily cultivated in neutral to soft water and tropical to sub-tropical temperatures. Rich substrate and good light. Common in the cultivated aquarium trade.

Emersed plants readily produce flowers and seeds but it can be grown submersed as well. Most plants sold are grown emersed on plant farms. Once submerged, leaves may die off before underwater leaves develop. In the aquarium grow in the background as a specimen plant. It will soon outgrow a smaller aquarium but removing the floating leaves will help keep it smaller and submerse. Needs a large, deep aquarium to grow properly. CO_{2} infusion helps stronger growth. A heavy feeder and for optimum growth a rich substrate is needed, including clay. If grown emerse it is prone to attacks by aphids. Not fussy as to water conditions, tropical aquarium temperatures. Can be grown outdoors in warmer countries, won't tolerate frost. Regarding it's requirements for light, it's a high light demanding.

Can be grown in or by the pond in warmer climes. The seeds can be sown in shallow water.

== Forms ==
Tropica Marble, Marble Queen has an attractive marbled leaf surface which tends to be lost in low light conditions. Tends to remain as a submerged plant longer than the type plant. Likes good substrate, CO_{2} and a strong light.

ovalis is a small, orbiculate plant whose low, wide growth makes it suitable for small aquariums. Reaches a height of about 35 cm (14 in) with a width of about 30 cm (12 in).

ssp. fluitans is fast-growing, suitable for large aquariums. Less likely to grow up above the water surface. If it grows large enough, it forms large leaves just under the surface instead. Reaches a height of about 40 cm (16 in).

== Gallery ==
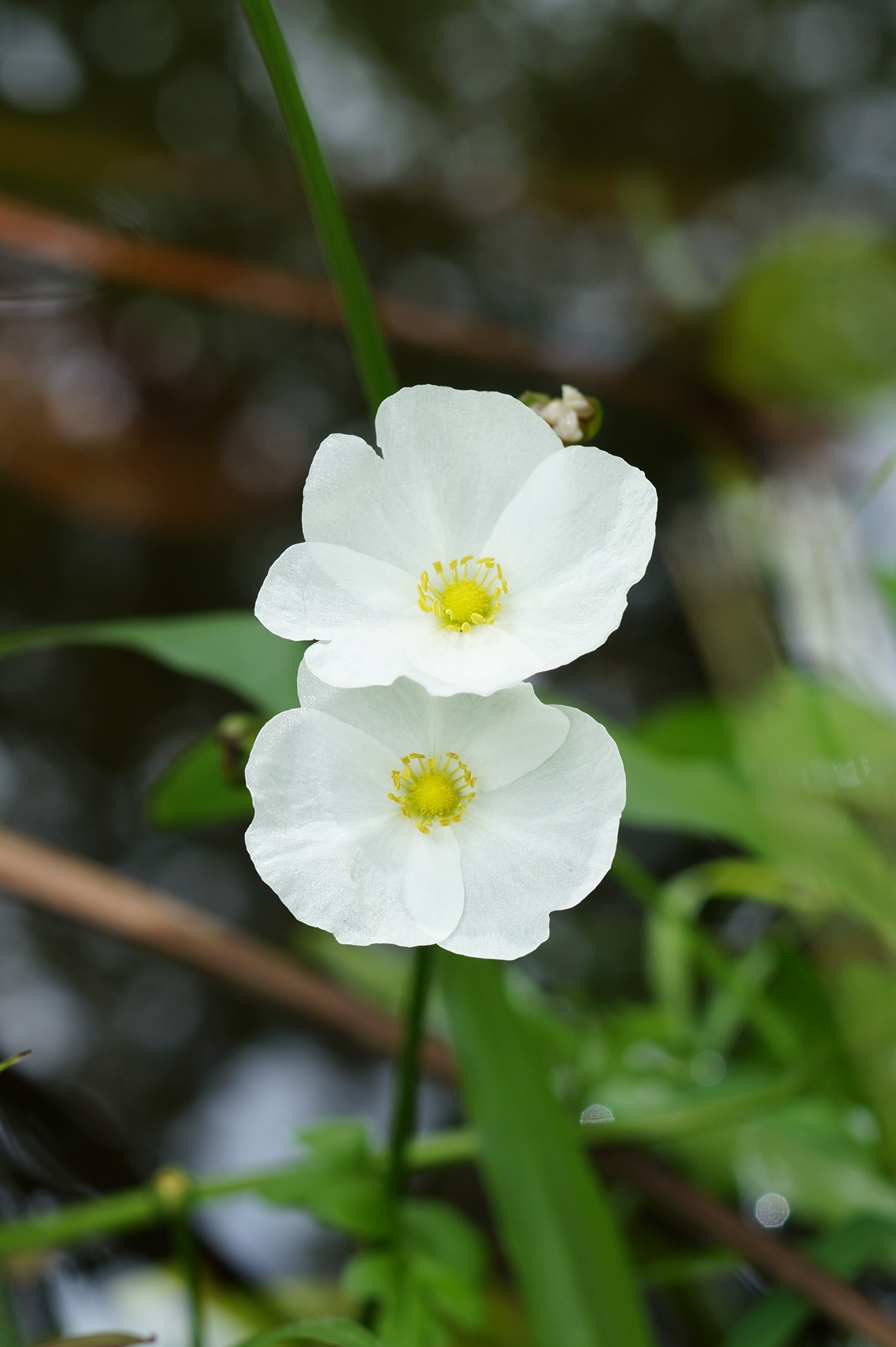
Flower of Echinodorus cordifolius

== See also ==
- Echinodorus palaefolius
