= Aquarius tunicatus =

Scientific classification
- Kingdom: Plantae
- Clade: Tracheophytes
- Clade: Angiosperms
- Clade: Monocots
- Order: Alismatales
- Family: Alismataceae
- Genus: Aquarius
- Species: A. tunicatus

Binomial name
- Aquarius tunicatus Aquarius tunicatus (Small) Christenh. & Byng in: Global Fl. 4: 53 (2018)

Species of plant

Aquarius tunicatus or Echinodorus tunicatus is a species of aquatic plants in the family Alismataceae.

In Rataj's taxonomy E. tunicatus is in Section Longipetali, Subgenus Echinodorus

Sometimes seen as Queen of Hearts

== Description ==
Leaves upright, up to 90 cm long, blades distinctly cordate, 15 – 30 cm long x 10 – 23 cm wide, petioles glabrous or muricate under the blade. The pellucid lines, visible under magnification, form a network that is unrelated to the pattern of the veins.

Flowering stem tem 70 – 120 cm long, usually straight, cylindrical or costate below, triangular between the whorls. Inflorescence racemose, having 5 - 7 whorls containing 12 - 25 flowers each. Bracts at the base ovate and lengthened to a long point, up to 6 cm long with broad membranous margins. Pedicels 2 – 3 cm long, sepals green, later yellow with about 30 ribs, during ripening enlarging to a length of 10 – 12 mm and fully covering the aggregate fruit. Petals white, 5 – 8 mm long, corolla 1.6 - 1.8 cm in diameter, about 30 stamens. Aggregate fruit 1 - 1.5 cm in diameter, achenes claviform about 3 mm long x 1 mm wide, usually with 3 facial ribs and 3 glands in an oblique row in the upper half of the body. Stylar beak about 1 mm long.

== Distribution ==
Central America. First gathered in Panama in 1908, but now also known from Brazil, Costa Rica, Colombia, Ecuador and Peru.

Propagated by division or adventitious plantlets.

== See also ==
- List of plants of Cerrado vegetation of Brazil
