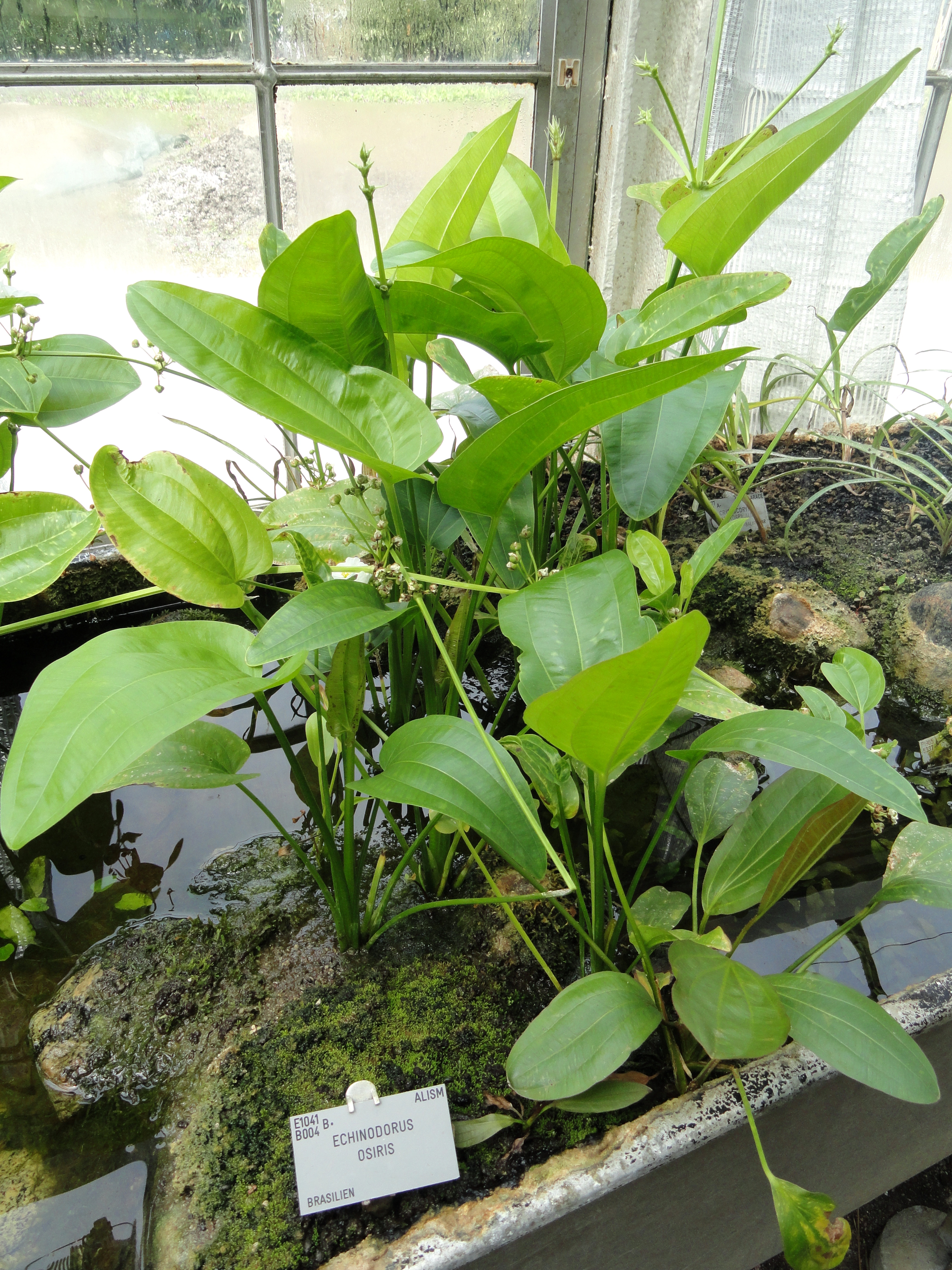

Scientific classification
- Kingdom: Plantae
- Clade: Tracheophytes
- Clade: Angiosperms
- Clade: Monocots
- Order: Alismatales
- Family: Alismataceae
- Genus: Aquarius
- Species: A. uruguayensis

Binomial name
- Aquarius uruguayensis (Arechav.) Christenh. & Byng, 2018

Synonyms
- Echinodorus martii var. uruguayensis (Arechav.) Hauman; Echinodorus grandiflorus var. pusillus Micheli in A.L.P.de Candolle & A.C.P.de Candolle; Echinodorus aschersonianus Graebn.; Echinodorus horemanii Rataj; Echinodorus opacus Rataj; Echinodorus osiris Rataj; Echinodorus portoalegrensis Rataj; Echinodorus africanus Rataj; Echinodorus barthii H.Mühlberg; Echinodorus janii Rataj; Echinodorus veronikae Rataj; Echinodorus multiflorus Rataj; Echinodorus uruguayensis Arech.; Echinodorus uruguayensis var. minor Kasselm; Echinodorus viridis Rataj

= Aquarius uruguayensis =

Species of aquatic plant

Aquarius uruguayensis is a plant species in the Alismataceae. It is native to South America (Brazil, Argentina, Paraguay, Uruguay, Chile).

== Description ==
Submersed leaves (5)-30-50 cm long, blades ribbon-shaped, green or darkly red-brown having undulate margins, (9)-20-30 cm long x 1 - 2 - (3) cm wide, trimmed with distinct pellucid lines. Emersed leaves rare, 20 – 50 cm long, petioles longer than the blades. Blades regularly ovate or oval, on the tip blunt, 7.5 – 13 cm long x 2 - 4.5 cm wide, having distinct pellucid lines. Stem upright or deflexed, (20)-30-(45) cm long, proliferous. Inflorescence racemose, rarely branching in the lower whorl, having (2)-4-(6) whorls containing 6 -12 flowers each. Bracts lanceolate, usually shorter than the pedicels, shallowly connate, 1 - 1.5 cm long. Pedicels 1.5 - 2 – 3 cm long. Corolla white, 1 - 1.5 cm in diameter, stamens 18, achenes 1 - 1.5 mm long, having usually 3 glands in oblique row in the upper part of the body.

Distinct varieties are sold in the trade which may or may not be this plant. Young growth is often reddish in colour.

Often confused with E. maior.

== Cultivation ==
Not often available, which is a pity as it is well suited to submerse growth. Can be propagated by division, though it tends to grow slowly. Not fussy as to water conditions and will grow in sub-tropical temperatures, in which it seems to bloom more readily. Likes a nutriment rich substrate and good light levels. Additional CO_{2} helps growth.

It will bloom readily if grown emerse, but takes a while to form a new set of emerse leaves. This change from submerse to emerse growth is best done gradually.
