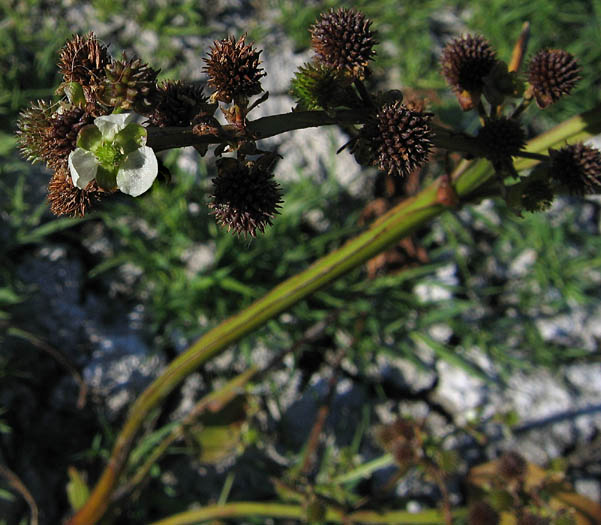

Scientific classification
- Kingdom: Plantae
- Clade: Tracheophytes
- Clade: Angiosperms
- Clade: Monocots
- Order: Alismatales
- Family: Alismataceae
- Genus: Echinodorus
- Species: E. berteroi

Binomial name
- Echinodorus berteroi (Spreng.) Fassett in Rhodora, 57:1139, 1955
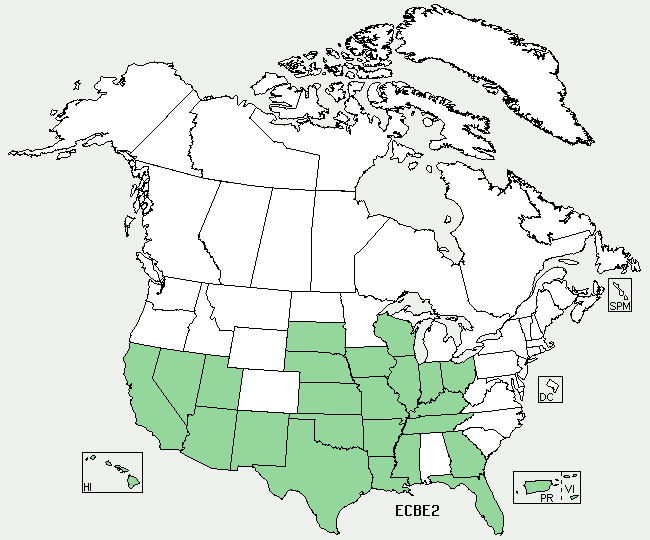

Synonyms
- Alisma berteroi Spreng.; Alisma berteroanum Balb. ex Schult. & Schult.f. in J.J.Roemer & J.A.Schultes; Alisma sprengelii Rich. ex Kunth; Echinodorus cordifolius var. berteroanus (Balb. ex Schult. & Schult.f.) Griseb.; Alisma rostratum Nutt.; Alisma macrophyllum var. minus Seub. in C.F.P.von Martius; Echinodorus rostratus (Nutt.) Engelm.; Echinodorus rostratus var. lanceolatus Engelm. ex S.Watson & Coult. in A.Gray; Echinodorus patagonicus Speg.; Sagittaria rostrata (Nutt.) Kuntze; Echinodorus cordifolius var. lanceolatus (Engelm. ex S.Watson & Coult.) Mack. & Bush; Echinodorus cordifolius f. lanceolatus (Engelm. ex S.Watson & Coult.) Fernald; Echinodorus rostratus f. lanceolatus (Engelm. ex S.Watson & Coult.) Fernald; Echinodorus berteroi var. lanceolatus (Engelm. ex S.Watson & Coult.) Fernald; Echinodorus berteroi var. patagonicus (Speg.) Rataj; Echinodorus berteroi subsp. patagonicus (Speg.) Rataj; Echinodorus longilineatus Rataj

= Echinodorus berteroi =

Cellophane sword

Species of aquatic plant

Echinodorus berteroi (upright burhead or cellophane sword) is an aquatic plant species in the Alismataceae It is native to the southern and central parts of the United States, as well as Central America, the West Indies, and South America as far south as Argentina.

== Description ==
Submersed leaves often modified into phyllodes, 10 – 45 cm long x 0.5 – 4 cm wide, linear to narrowly elliptical, of very variable shape and size, light-green, membraneously transparent, network between the veins often lighter or darker, thus the submersed leaves often appearing mosaic-like coloured. Emerse leaves long-petioled, 5 – 55 cm long, blades light-green, cordate, 5 – 12 cm long x 3 – 5 cm wide, in terrestrial dwarf forms the blades are ovate, truncate at the base, 2 – 5 cm long x 1 – 2 cm wide. In the blades there are very clear pellucid lines 1 – 5 mm (exceptionally up to 11 mm) long. Stem upright, inflorescence compound, branched in lower whorls. In terrestrial forms stem only 6 – 10 cm long. Corolla white, about 1.5 cm in diameter, stamens 12, achenes numerous in echinate head, nutlets grey-brown, 2.5 - 3.5 mm long x 1 - 1.3 mm wide, broadly keeled, with 2 winged ribs alternating with 3 non-winged ribs; facial gland single, close to the beak, indistinct or quite absent. Mature specimens may have between 10 - 30 leaves. most of them differing in shape and size.

== Cultivation ==
Prefers a larger tank with a deep, rich substrate and good light. It is easy to grow but will soon outgrow the average aquarium. Can be divided, or in submerse plants, adventitious plantlets will form on the inflorescence and can be divided and planted out. Seed will be set in emerse plants, and can be planted out in shallow trays with sand and shallow warm water. Prefers soft, rather acid water. Sub-tropical to tropical temperatures. It doesn't seem to thrive in hard water. Will grow in and by the pond in warmer regions, but must be protected from frost.
