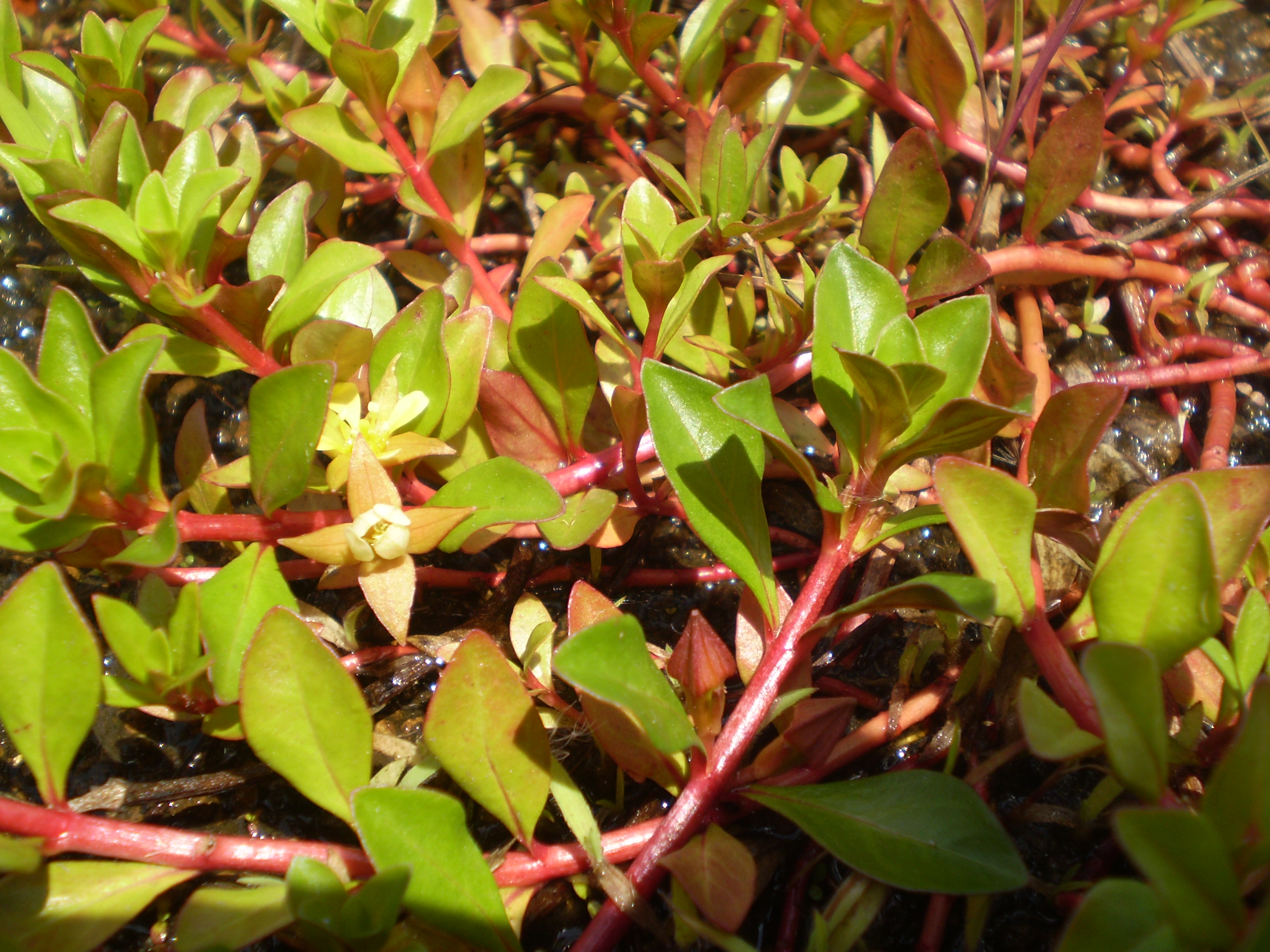

Conservation status
- Least Concern (IUCN 3.1)

Scientific classification
- Kingdom: Plantae
- Clade: Tracheophytes
- Clade: Angiosperms
- Clade: Eudicots
- Clade: Rosids
- Order: Myrtales
- Family: Onagraceae
- Genus: Ludwigia
- Species: L. repens

Binomial name
- Ludwigia repens J.R.Forst.

= Ludwigia repens =

Species of flowering plant

Ludwigia repens is a species of flowering plant in the evening primrose family known by the common name creeping primrose-willow. It is native to parts of the Americas and it has the potential to spread easily and become naturalized in many areas. It is known as an aquatic weed in some regions. It is also cultivated as an aquarium plant. This is a mat-forming perennial herb with a creeping stem up to 30 centimeters long, rooting at nodes which come in contact with wet substrate. The leaves are oppositely arranged and up to 4 or 5 centimeters long. The flower has four yellow colored petals no more than 3 millimeters long nested on a base of four pointed sepals which may be slightly longer.

A recent study found that the phytochemicals present in L. repens act as a potent central nervous system depressant and painkiller in vivo.
