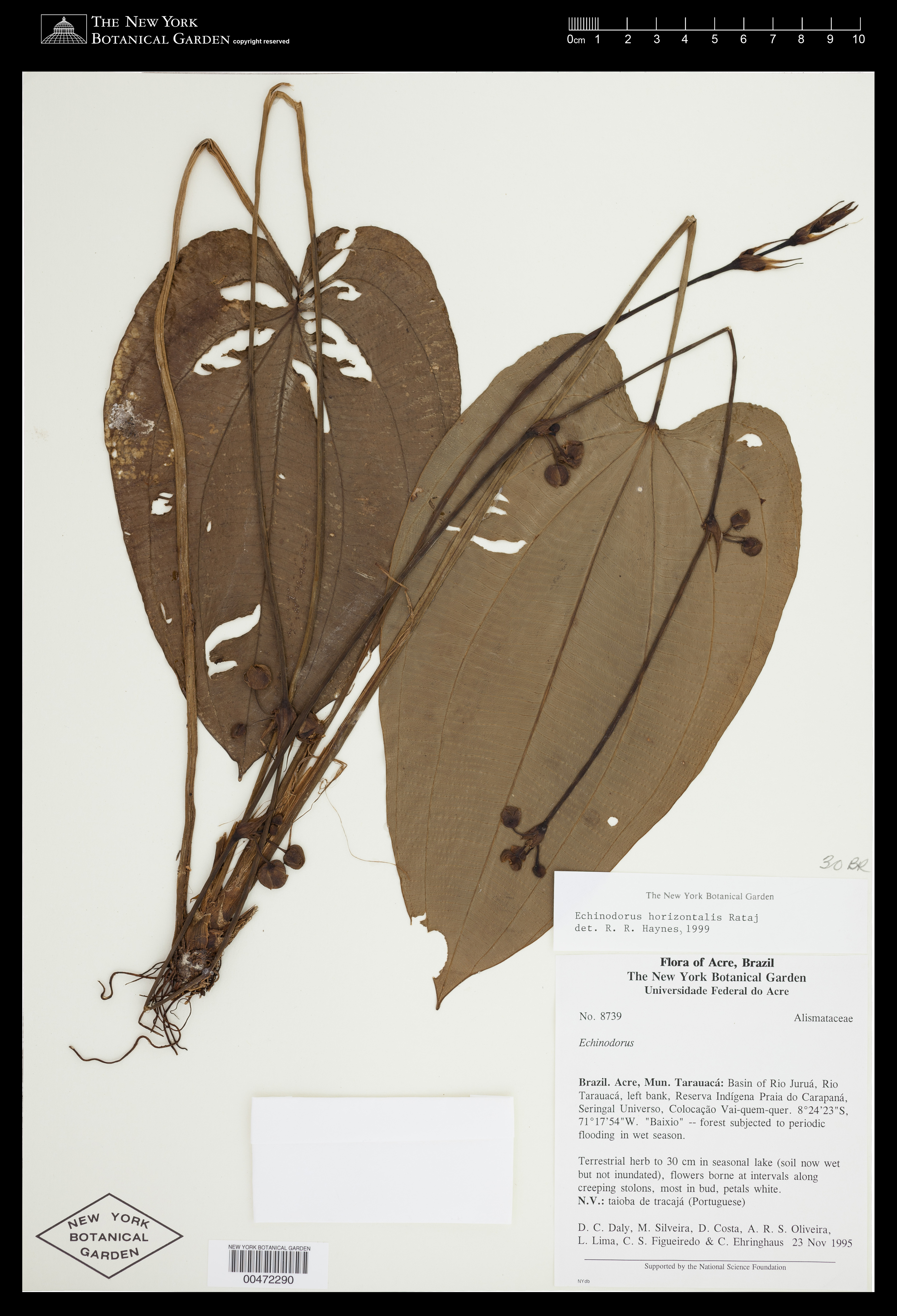

Scientific classification
- Kingdom: Plantae
- Clade: Tracheophytes
- Clade: Angiosperms
- Clade: Monocots
- Order: Alismatales
- Family: Alismataceae
- Genus: Aquarius
- Species: A. horizontalis

Binomial name
- Aquarius horizontalis (Rataj) Christenh. & Byng, 2018

Synonyms
- Echinodorus interruptus Rataj

= Aquarius horizontalis =

Species of plant

Aquarius horizontalis or Echinodorus horizontalis is a species of plant in the Alismataceae family. It is native to northern South America (Venezuela, Colombia, Guyana, Ecuador, Peru, northern Brazil).

== Description ==
The leaves are 25 – 40cm long. The blades join the petiole at an obtuse angle so that they stand nearly horizontally. They are ovate or cordate, on the tip acuminate, the base truncate or shortly lobate, usually with 7 veins, 10 – 17cm long x 5 – 8cm wide. Stem recurved, proliferous, 25 – 60cm long. The inflorescence is racemose, having 2 – 4 whorls containing only 3 – 6 flowers each. The bracts are shorter than pedicels, which are 1 – 1.5cm long. The sepals are ovate, membraneous, 4 – 6mm long, having 18 – 24 ribs. During ripening the sepals enlarge and cover partly the aggregate fruit. The petals are white, ovate, corolla 1.5 – 1.8cm in diameter, stamens 26 – 30cm. Anthers oblong, 5 – 10 x shorter than filaments. The aggregate fruit is globular, 0.7 – 0.9cm in diameter, achenes 3mm long x 1mm wide, having 3 – 4 ribs and usually 6 glands in 2 rows. Young leaves are red and brown, while older leaves are green.

== Cultivation ==
The plant needs a deep bed of rich substrate, and plenty of light and water on the more acidic and soft side, and tropical temperatures. It will grow well emersed or submersed. Propagation is mainly by adventitious plantlets, which form on the inflorescence. A rather demanding species, it is now rarely seen.

The flowers, normally emersed, open in the later morning hours only for about 2 hours. After this, it closes completely. E. horizontalis opens its flowers even under water. The plant is self-fertile.

Seed germination seems variable, but Rataj & Horemann report most success at higher temperatures (28 C).

Without flowers it can be confused with other species such as E. tunicatus, and rarely seems to be offered as the true species in the trade.
