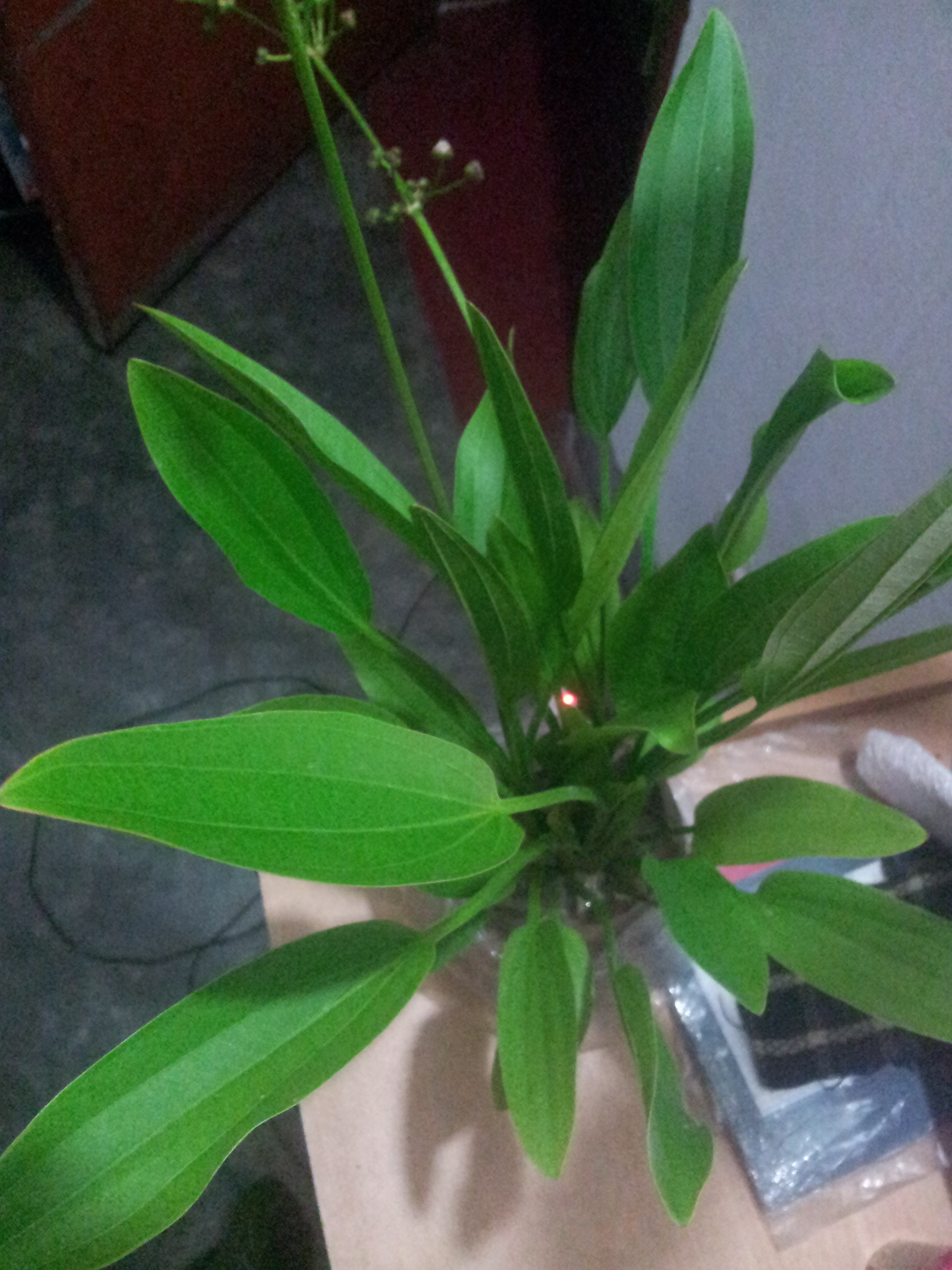

Scientific classification
- Kingdom: Plantae
- Clade: Embryophytes
- Clade: Tracheophytes
- Clade: Angiosperms
- Clade: Monocots
- Order: Alismatales
- Family: Alismataceae
- Genus: Aquarius
- Species: A. palifolius

Binomial name
- Aquarius palifolius (Nees & Mart.) J.F.Macbr.

Synonyms
- Sagittaria palifolia Nees & Mart; Alisma palifolium (Nees & Mart.) Kunth; Alisma ellipticum Mart. ex Schult.f. in J.J.Roemer & J.A.Schultes; Alisma virgata Hook. & Arn.; Alisma nathpurense Steud.; Alisma ellipticum var. minus Seub. in C.F.P.von Martius; Echinodorus ellipticus (Mart. ex Schult.f.) Micheli in A.L.P.de Candolle & A.C.P.de Candolle; Echinodorus ellipticus var. latifolius Micheli in A.L.P.de Candolle & A.C.P.de Candolle; Echinodorus ellipticus var. minus (Seub.) Micheli in A.L.P.de Candolle & A.C.P.de Candolle; Echinodorus virgatus (Hook. & Arn.) Micheli in A.L.P.de Candolle & A.C.P.de Candolle; Sagittaria palifolia var. elliptica (Mart. ex Schult.f.) Kuntze; Sagittaria palifolia f. foliosobracteata Kuntze; Sagittaria palifolia var. heterophylla Kuntze; Sagittaria palifolia var. undulata Kuntze; Echinodorus palifolius var. latifolius (Micheli) Rataj; Echinodorus palifolius var. minus (Seub.) Rataj; Echinodorus piauhyensis Kasselm

= Aquarius palifolius =

Species of plant

Aquarius palifolius, synonyms including Echinodorus palifolius, also known as Mexican sword plant, is an emerged aquatic plant in the Alismataceae. It has a rather odd, discontinuous range, native to Brazil (Minas Gerais and Bahia), Peru, Uruguay, and Mexico (Nayarit). It has been introduced in many countries including Bangladesh and India.

The specific epithet is sometimes spelled palaefolius. The correct spelling is palifolius per ICN 60G.1.

== Gallery ==
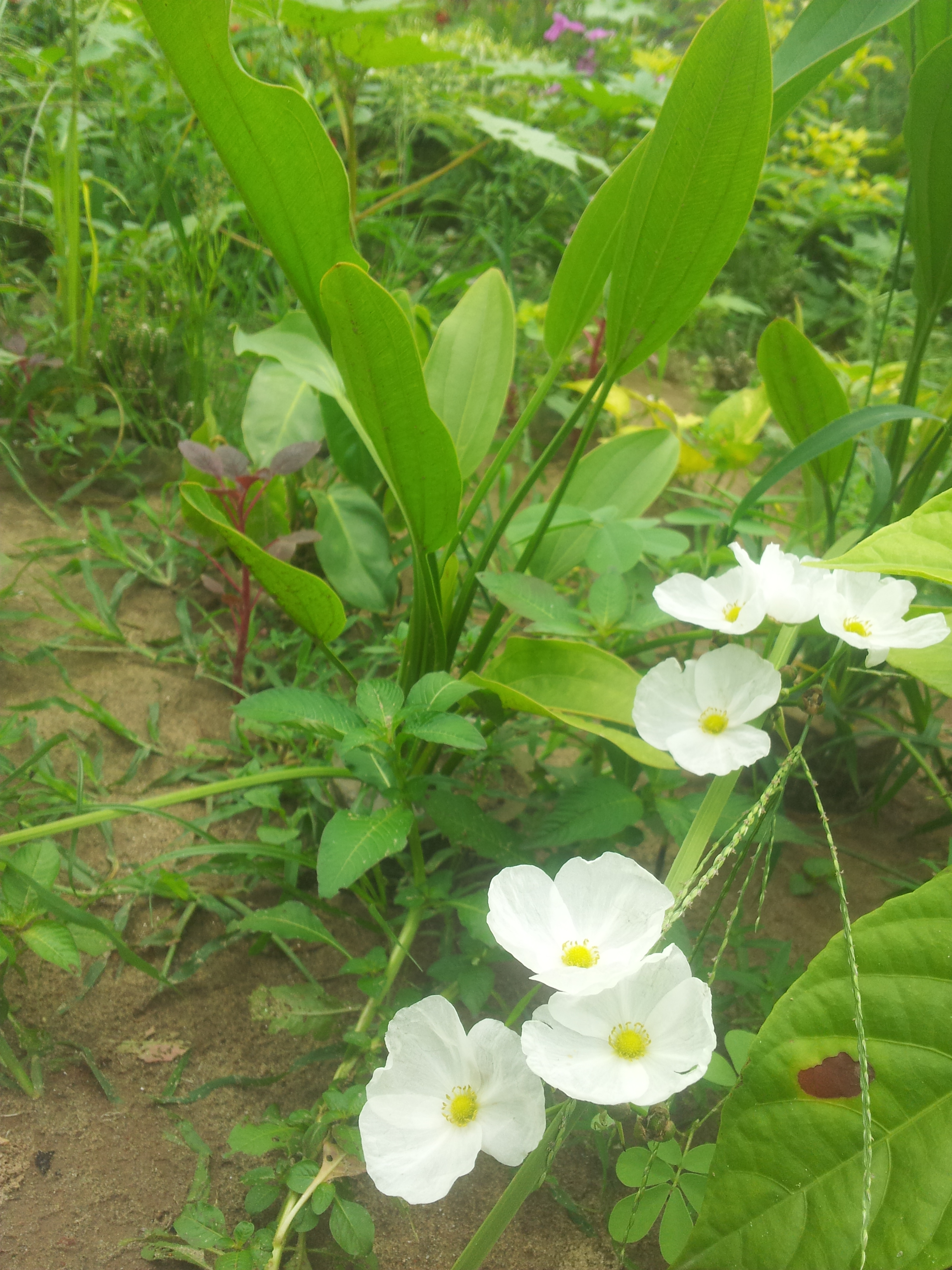
Mexican Sword-Plant Flowers in Bangladesh

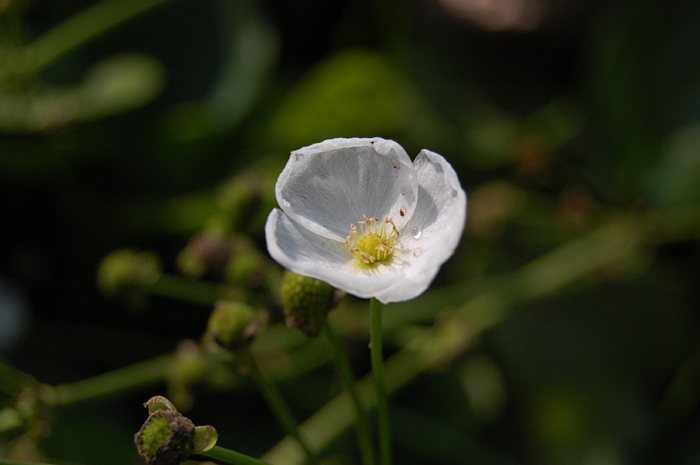
A single flower

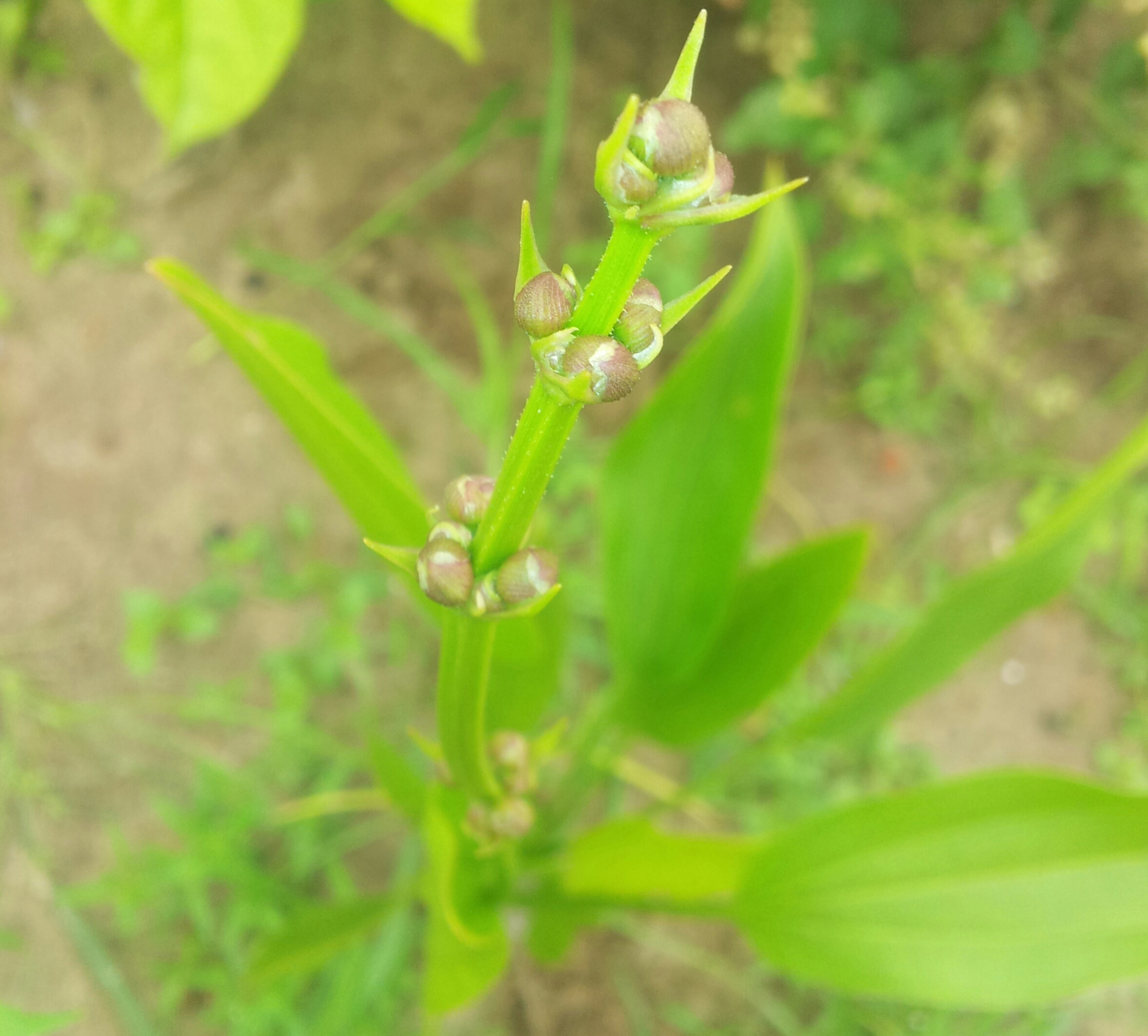
Mexican sword flower buds
