= Echinodorus =

Scientific classification
- Kingdom: Plantae
- Clade: Tracheophytes
- Clade: Angiosperms
- Clade: Monocots
- Order: Alismatales
- Family: Alismataceae
- Genus: Echinodorus; Rich.

Genus of aquatic flowering plant

Echinodorus, commonly known as burhead, is a genus of plant in the family Alismataceae. It contains a single species, Echinodorus berteroi, which is native to the Americas. The name is derived from Ancient Greek echius 'rough husk', and doros 'leathern bottle', alluding to ovaries, which in some species are armed with persistent styles, forming prickly head of fruit.

== Description ==
The plants are annual or perennial, growing emersed, floating-leaved, or seasonally submersed, leaves glabrous to stellate-pubescent; rhizomes present or absent; stolons absent; corms absent; tubers absent. Roots not septate. Leaves sessile or petiolate; petioles triangular, rarely terete; blade with translucent markings as dots or lines present or absent, linear to lanceolate to ovate, base attenuate to cordate, margins entire or undulating, apex obtuse to acute. Inflorescences racemes or panicles, rarely umbels, of 1–18 whorls, erect or decumbent, emersed; bracts coarse, apex obtuse to acute, surfaces smooth or papillose along veins, apex obtuse to acute. Flowers bisexual, subsessile to pedicellate; bracts subtending pedicels, subulate to lanceolate, shorter than to longer than pedicels, apex obtuse to acute; pedicels ascending to recurved; receptacle convex; sepals recurved to spreading, herbaceous to leathery, sculpturing absent; petals white, entire; stamens 9–25; filaments linear, glabrous; pistils 15–250 or more, spirally arranged on convex receptacle, forming head, distinct; ovules 1; style terminal or lateral. Fruits plump, often longitudinally ribbed, sometimes flattened, rarely abaxially keeled, abaxial wings absent, lateral wings absent, glands often present.

== Cultivation ==
Echinodorus are by nature marsh and bog plants that can grow submersed. Many species are grown in aquariums. They prefer good light and grow best in a deep, nutrient-rich substrate. Most will grow in variable water conditions, though the majority need tropical or sub-tropical temperature ranges. Propagation is by division or by adventitious new plants developing on submerged flowering stems. The larger species make magnificent specimen plants for the larger aquarium, though they may form aerial leaves in good conditions. If the inflorescence forms submersed, small plantlets will form instead of flowers. If grown emersed and kept humid, flowers and seeds will normally readily form. The seeds can be grown in damp sand in warm, damp conditions. Additional CO_{2} often helps in strong growth.

Many species are popular in the aquarium or pond. The Amazon sword plants are one of the most popular aquarium plants for their attractive form and general hardiness.

A submerged culture system was developed for rapid micropropagation of this commercially important aquarium plant Amazon sword (Echinodorus 'Indian Red').

== Taxonomy ==
The genus Baldellia seems to be very closely related. In the latest revision by Karel Rataj, 62 species, 2 subspecies, and 2 varieties are listed.

All species of Echinodorus are variable according to whether they are growing emersed or submerged and their growing conditions. In addition they can hybridise in the wild or through artificial means. Many forms have been given subspecific status or as named forms in the aquarium trade. According to aquarists some of these forms persist in all growing conditions.

== Formerly included species ==
Note this list is incomplete.

- Echinodorus angustifolius Rataj – now Helanthium bolivianum (Rusby) Lehtonen & Myllys
- Echinodorus argentinensis Rataj – now Aquarius grandiflorus (Cham. & Schltdl.) Christenh. & Byng
- Echinodorus aschersonianus Graebn. – now Aquarius uruguayensis (Arechav.) Christenh. & Byng
- Echinodorus bleherae Rataj – now Aquarius grisebachii (Small) Christenh. & Byng
- Echinodorus bracteatus Micheli – now Aquarius bracteatus (Micheli) Christenh. & Byng
- Echinodorus cordifolius (L.) Griseb. – now Aquarius cordifolius (L.) Christenh. & Byng
- Echinodorus cylindricus Rataj – now Aquarius paniculatus (Micheli) Christenh. & Byng
- Echinodorus decumbens Kasselm. – now Aquarius decumbens
- Echinodorus densinervis Somogyi – now Aquarius densinervis (Somogyi) Christenh. & Byng
- Echinodorus eglandulosus Rataj – now Aquarius grisebachii (Small) Christenh. & Byng
- Echinodorus emersus Lehtonen – now Aquarius emersus (Lehtonen) Christenh. & Byng
- Echinodorus floribundus (Seub.) Seub. – now Aquarius floribundus (Seub.) Christenh. & Byng
- Echinodorus × gabrielii Rataj – unplaced
- Echinodorus glaucus Rataj – now Aquarius glaucus (Rataj) Christenh. & Byng
- Echinodorus grandiflorus (Cham. & Schltdl.) Micheli – now Aquarius grandiflorus (Cham. & Schltdl.) Christenh. & Byng
- Echinodorus grisebachii Small – now Aquarius grisebachii (Small) Christenh. & Byng
- Echinodorus heikobleheri Rataj – now Aquarius grisebachii (Small) Christenh. & Byng
- Echinodorus horizontalis Rataj – now Aquarius horizontalis (Rataj) Christenh. & Byng
- Echinodorus inpai Rataj – now Aquarius inpai (Rataj) Christenh. & Byng
- Echinodorus isthmicus Fassett – now Helanthium bolivianum (Rusby) Lehtonen & Myllys
- Echinodorus lanceolatus Rataj – now Aquarius lanceolatus (Rataj) Christenh. & Byng
- Echinodorus longipetalus Micheli – now Aquarius longipetalus (Micheli) Christenh. & Byng
- Echinodorus longiscapus Arechav. – now Aquarius longiscapus (Arechav. Christenh. & Byng)
- Echinodorus macrocarpus Rataj – now Aquarius pubescens (Mart. ex Schult.f.) Christenh. & Byng
- Echinodorus macrophyllus (Kunth) Micheli – now Aquarius macrophyllus (Kunth.) Christenh. & Byng
- Echinodorus major (Micheli) Rataj – now Aquarius major (Micheli) Christenh. & Byng
- Echinodorus nymphaeifolius (Griseb.) Buchenau – now Albidella nymphaeifolia (Griseb.) Pichon
- Echinodorus × opacus Rataj – now Echinodorus × portoalegrensis Rataj (unplaced)
- Echinodorus osiris Rataj – now Aquarius uruguayensis (Arechav.) Christenh. & Byng
- Echinodorus ovalis C.Wright – now Aquarius cordifolius (L.) Christenh. & Byng
- Echinodorus palifolius (Nees & Mart.) J.F.Macbr. – now Aquarius palifolius (Nees & Mart.) Christenh. & Byng
- Echinodorus paniculatus Micheli – now Aquarius paniculatus (Micheli) Christenh. & Byng
- Echinodorus reptilis Lehtonen – now Aquarius reptilis (Lehtonen) Christenh. & Byng
- Echinodorus scaber Rataj – now Aquarius scaber (Rataj) Christenh. & Byng
- Echinodorus subalatus (Mart. ex Schult.f.) Griseb. – now Aquarius subalatus (Mart. ex Schult.f.) Christenh. & Byng
- Echinodorus tenellus (Mart. ex Schult.f.) Buchenau – now Helanthium tenellum (Mart. ex Schult.f.) J.G.Sm.
- Echinodorus trialatus Fassett – now Aquarius trialatus (Fassett) Christenh & Byng
- Echinodorus tunicatus Small – now Aquarius tunicatus (Small) Christenh & Byng
- Echinodorus uruguayensis Arechav. – now Aquarius uruguayensis (Arechav.) Christenh. & Byng
- Echinodorus virgatus (Hook. & Arn.) Micheli – now Aquarius palifolius (Nees & Mart.) Christenh & Byng

== Bibliography ==
- Lehtonen S and Myllys L. 2008. Cladistic analysis of Echinodorus (Alismataceae): simultaneous analysis of molecular and morphological data. Cladistics 24: 218–239.
