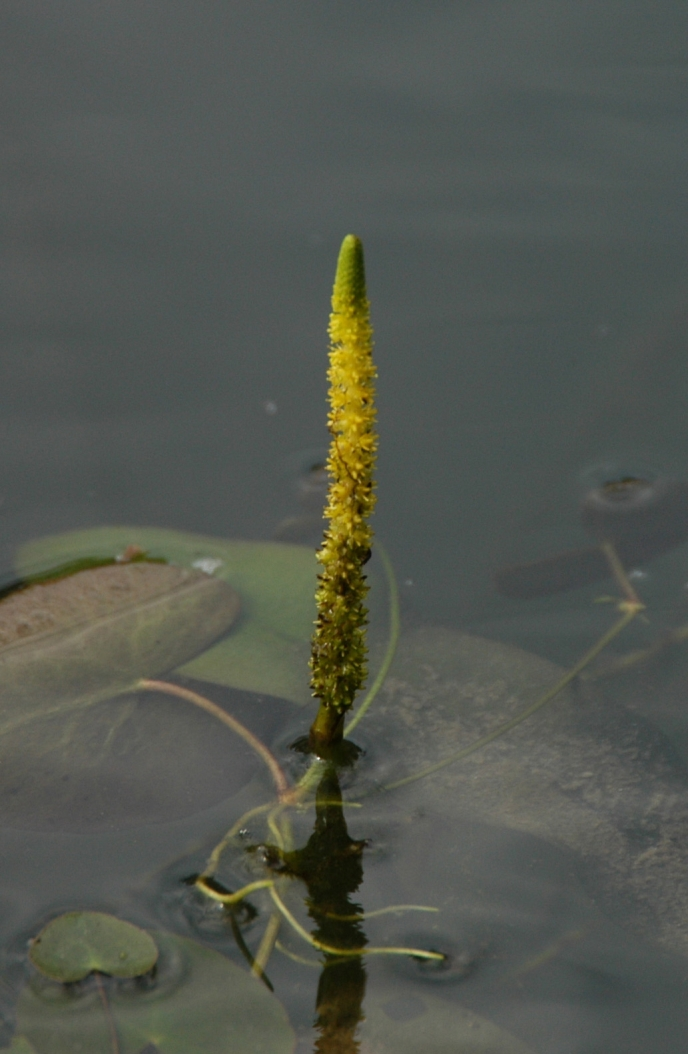

Conservation status
- Least Concern (IUCN 3.1)

Scientific classification
- Kingdom: Plantae
- Clade: Embryophytes
- Clade: Tracheophytes
- Clade: Spermatophytes
- Clade: Angiosperms
- Clade: Monocots
- Order: Alismatales
- Family: Aponogetonaceae
- Genus: Aponogeton
- Species: A. lakhonensis

Binomial name
- Aponogeton lakhonensis A.Camus

Synonyms
- Aponogeton luteus A.Camus; Aponogeton pygmaeus K.Krause

= Aponogeton lakhonensis =

Species of aquatic plant

Aponogeton lakhonensis is a species of an aquatic plant in the Aponogetonaceae family. This species with a yellow-flowered single spike rising above the water, is found in ricefields, ponds and slow-moving streams of tropical and sub-tropical Asia. An outlier population occurs in Sulawesi, the main area of occurrence is from Thailand to China and Assam in India. It is more closely related to tropical Australian species of Aponogeton than it is to other Southeast Asian species. In Thailand the whole plant is eaten is salads, whereas Cambodians prefer the leaves alone served with fish sauce.

== Description ==
The species has an obovoid or elongated rhizome, up to 2 cm in length, with a filament remnant of the sheath often present. The petiole in submerged leaves is some 9 to 15 cm long, in floating leaves it is up to 40–60 cm in length. The narrowly ovate to linear leaf-blade is some 4–6 by 1–2 cm in size, herbaceous (soft, not woody/stiff), with some 7 to 9 primary veins at the base, cordate or rounded base, entire margin, either rounded apex or with a blunt tip. Pedunculate inflorescences, up to about 5 cm in size. Bisexual flowers, 2 yellow and slightly obovate perianth segments some 2 mm long; 6 stamens with broadened filaments toward the base; the carpels are slightly united near their base, with 4 to 6 ovules per carpel. Ovoid fruit with a short terminal beak, some 2–3 mm. Flowering in China occurs from April to October. Flowering time in Thailand is at least in March, May and September–October.

Distinguishing characteristics of this taxa include: inflorescence with one spike; persistent tepals up to about 3 mm, yellow and obovate; not stoloniferous; 4–8 ovules; double testa; widened filament; short lateral beak on fruit; leaves are mainly submerged, not floating, submerged leaves some 25–6 cm in size, floating leaves up to 17 by 4 cm; petiole of submerged leaves some 7–35 cm long; ovaries some 1–1.75 mm; fruit is up to 3 by 2 mm, the beak is short, terminal or lateral; with seeds up to 3 by 1 mm.

== Phylogeny ==
Friðgeir Grímsson (Icelandic name) et al. reviewed the literature on the origins of Aponogeton, including this species, A. lakhonensis. There are two theories for the origin of this species, that it came from Malaysian plants that migrated from India during the Miocene, or that it came from Australia in temperate conditions and migrated to tropical Asia and beyond. However they then discuss their recent find of Aponegoton pollen from the late Cretaceous and early Cenozoic in Greenland. This indicates an early Cretaceous origin of the genus and makes the locality uncertain.

Using nuclear and plastid DNA analysis, Chen et al. as well as the existing fossil record, including Friðgeir Grímsson et al.'s work, demonstrate that A. lakhonensis is in a sibling clade with the tropical Australian Aponogeton, and more distantly related to the other Southeast Asian species. They argue for a date of 5.2 million years ago for the crown of the clade of tropical Australian and A. lakhonensis. The ultimate ancestor for the family/genus was probably alive in the mid-Eocene and in Africa or Madagascar.

== Distribution ==
This species is native to an area from Southeast Asia to China and Assam, and also in Sulawesi. Countries and regions in which it occurs indigenously are: Indonesia (Sulawesi); Thailand; Cambodia; China (Fujian, Guangdong, Guangxi, Hainan, Jiangxi, Yunnan, Zhejiang {Longquan}); Taiwan; Laos; Myanmar; and India (Assam, Meghalaya, Nagaland).

== Habitat and ecology ==
The taxa is found in paddy fields, ponds and streams. It is more or less abundant at specific sites of slow-flowing watercourses, paddy fields, streams and ponds. It has been found up to 800m above sea level.

== Conservation ==
While the IUCN rates this water plant as of Least Concern (see infobox top right), this is not the same as "no concern". Little information is available on the species, more research is needed. The habitats that it occurs in are being continually diminished in area, extent and quality.

== Vernacular names ==
- pak kuap (near Lampang, Thailand)
- sbay mu:ng (="mosquito net", from leaf venation, Khmer language)
- 水蕹, shui weng (Standard Chinese)

== Uses ==
Near the city of Lampang, Thailand, the whole plant is eaten in salads. The leaves of this species are eaten in Cambodia, they are served raw with fish sauce.

== History ==
The species was named in 1910 by the French botanist Aimée Antoinette Camus (1879–1965). She specialised in orchids and oaks, her father was a botanist (Edmond Gustave Camus, 1852–1915), while the painter Blanche-Augustine Camus (1882–1968) was her sister. She published the description of the species in the publication Notulae Systematicae: Herbier du Muséum de Paris: Phanérogramie.
