= Perforate leaf =

Natural occurrence of holes in plant leaves

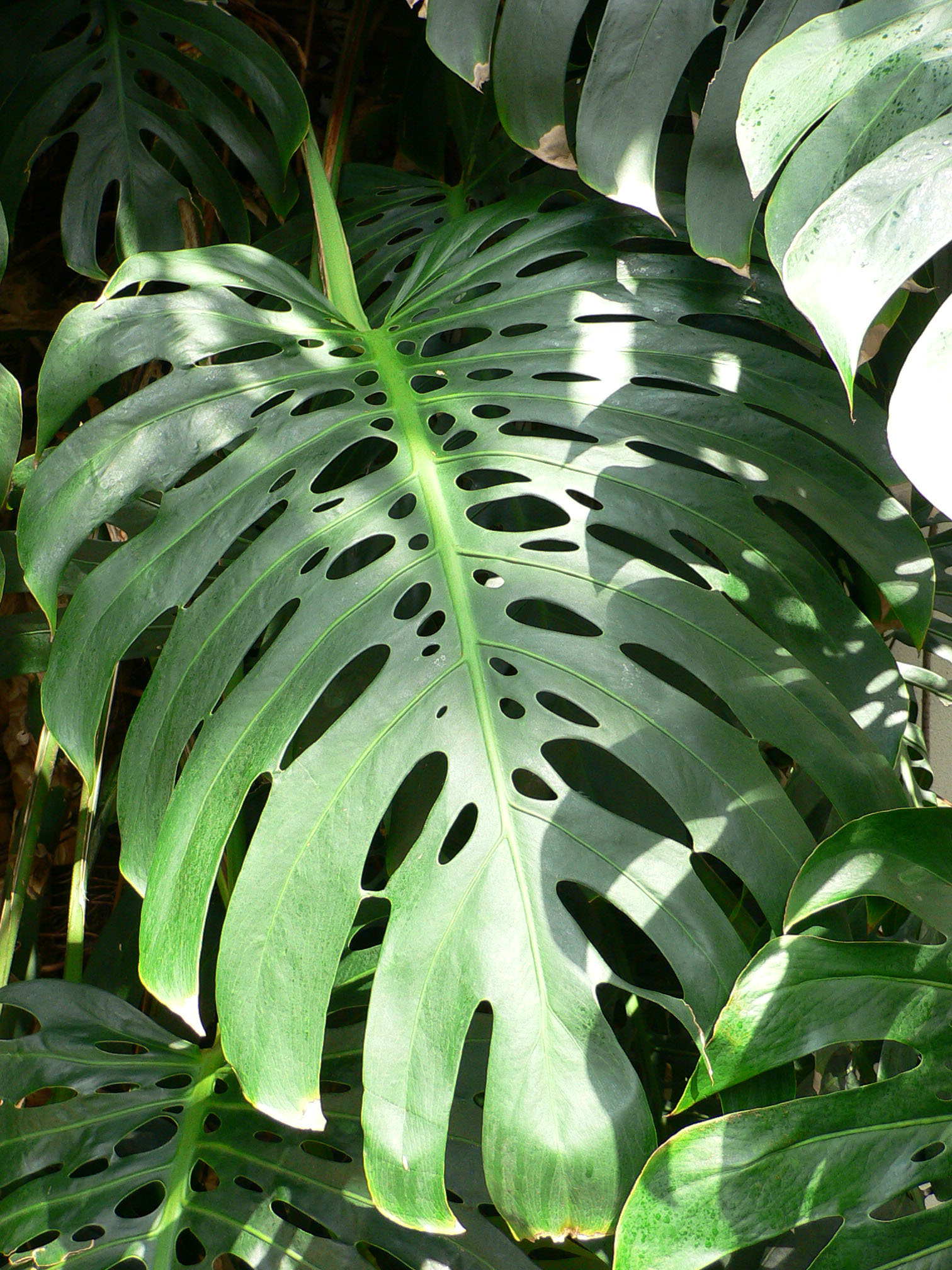
Perforation seen in Monstera deliciosa

Perforate leaves, sometimes called fenestrate, occur naturally in some species of plants. Holes develop as a leaf grows.

The size, shape, and quantity of holes in each leaf can vary greatly depending on the species or even within a single species. Perforation is caused by sections of leaf ceasing cell growth or by dying during an early stage in the development of the leaf. These deformations that are created earliest end up appearing more as slashes, whereas those that develop later end up looking more like holes. This trait is found in only one species in Aponogetonaceae, Aponogeton madagascariensis (Madagascar laceleaf), and a few genera in Araceae, particularly Monstera.

It is not fully known what evolutionary purpose perforation serves, but several possibilities exist. Perforation could serve to reduce variations in growth rate, decrease the chance of leaves tearing in high winds, or help to increase the amount of rain able to reach the plant's roots. It could also help to cool the plant by producing turbulence around the leaf. Another possibility is that perforation is a defense against herbivory, with holes making the leaf appear less enticing to consume. However, this is unlikely in relation to hemiepiphytic aroids, which often display this trait due to the tendency for juvenile leaves to not be perforated.

== See also ==
- Leaf window, leaves have translucent areas rather than holes.
