= Brockhaus and Efron Encyclopedic Dictionary =

Comprehensive multi-volume encyclopedia in Russian

The Brockhaus and Efron Encyclopaedic Dictionary (Note: Russian: Энциклопедический словарь Брокгауза и Ефрона, romanized: Entsiklopedicheskiy slovar Brokgauza i Yefrona, abbr. ЭСБЕ, ESBE) (35 volumes, small; 86 volumes, large) is a comprehensive multi-volume encyclopedia in Russian. It contains 121,240 articles, 7,800 images, and 235 maps.

It was published in the Russian Empire in 1890–1907, as a joint venture of Leipzig and St Petersburg publishers. The articles were written by the prominent Russian scholars of the period, such as Dmitri Mendeleev and Vladimir Solovyov. Reprints have appeared following the dissolution of the Soviet Union.

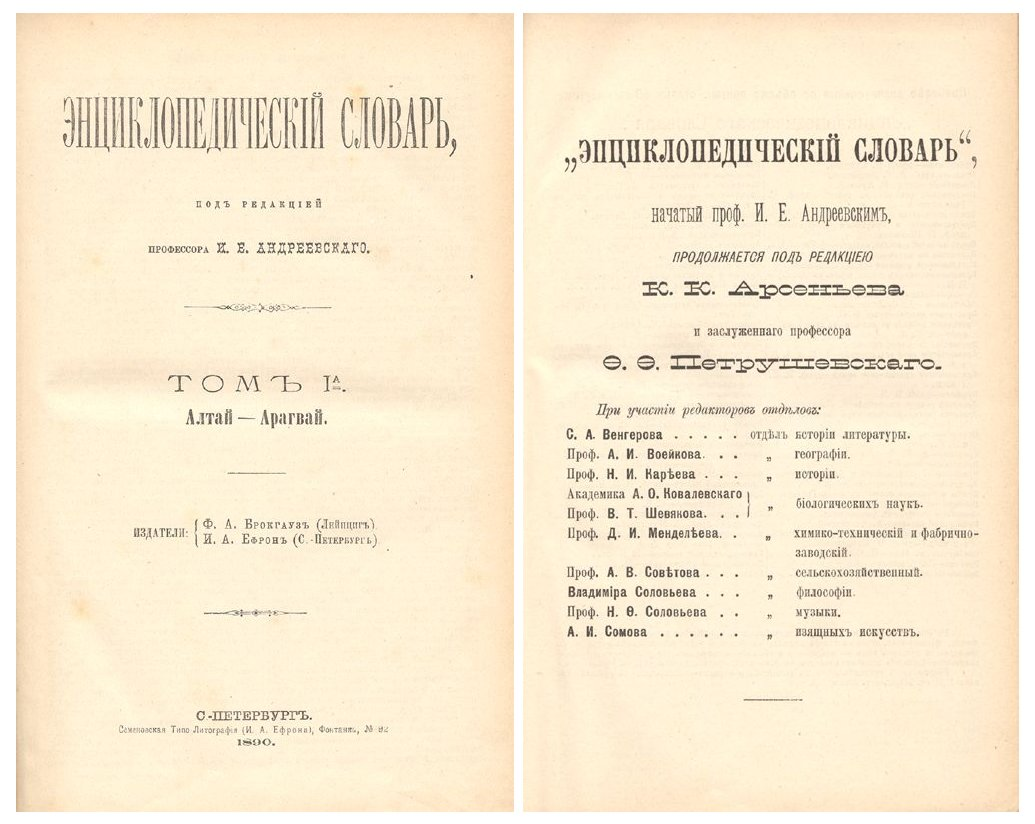
Title pages of Brockhaus and Efron Encyclopaedic Dictionary volumes 1a and 25.

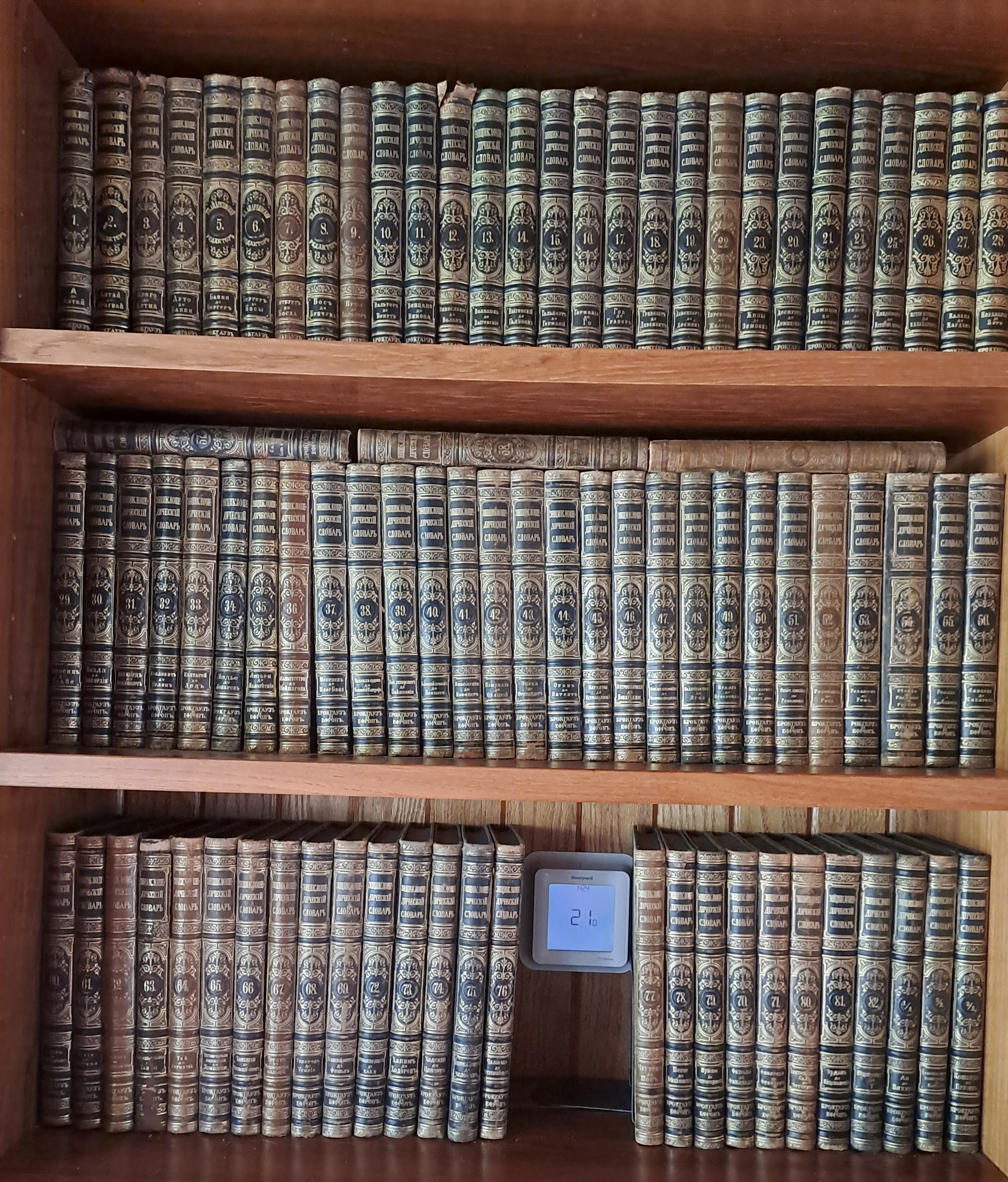
All 86 volumes of the Brokhaus and Efron encyclopedic dictionary

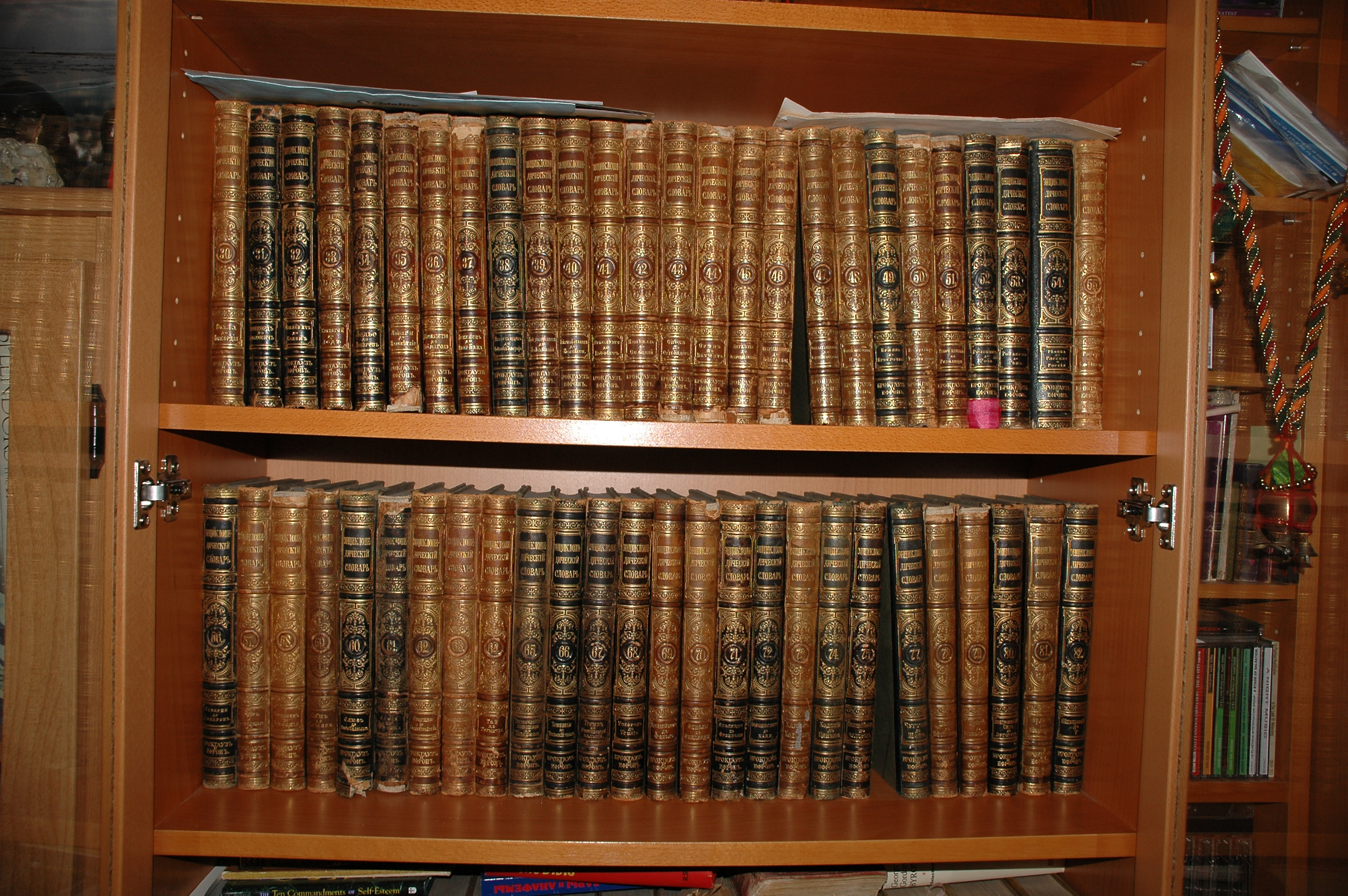
A part of the 86 volumes of Brockhaus and Efron Encyclopaedic Dictionary.

== History ==
In 1889, the owner of a printing house in St. Petersburg, Ilya Abramovich Efron, at the initiative of Semyon Afanasyevich Vengerov, entered into an agreement with the German publishing house F. A. Brockhaus for the translation into Russian of the large German encyclopaedic dictionary Meyers Konversations-Lexikon. Initially, it was supposed to be limited to the translation of this publication, but only with a more detailed presentation of issues related to Russia. It was supposed to release only 16–18 volumes.

The first eight volumes (up to the letter "B"), published under the general editorship of Professor Ivan Efimovich Andreevsky, were almost literal translation with a slight adaptation for the Russian reader. These volumes caused a lot of complaints about the quality of the translation, and the overall management of the publication also left much to be desired. So, the journal Severny Vestnik (Northern Herald) noted: "There are too many significant shortcomings. There is too little effort, love, and, what is stranger, not enough impressive edition, both literary and purely scholarly!" (1890, No. 4, pp. 76–77), and the journal Historical Bulletin added to this that the Encyclopaedic Dictionary was "carelessly and unsatisfactorily compiled. The very language of the articles is heavy and in places wrong. The translation is immediately visible, and it is far from a professorial one, but a gymnasium, awkward, literal" (1890, No. 5, p. 454).

After the death of Professor Ivan Andreevsky, the editorial office was headed by Academician Konstantin Konstantinovich Arseniev and Professor of St. Petersburg University Fyodor Fomich Petrushevsky, which marked a new period in the encyclopaedia's history. Starting from the 9th volume, the translated material fades into the background, and there is much more factual and statistical material. Particular attention was paid to geographical articles; the editorial states: "Absolutely all Russian cities are included, with the addition of more townships, villages and hamlets with over 3 thousand inhabitants or for some reason deserving attention."

The Encyclopaedic Dictionary began to be published in two versions. The first, more expensive, comprised 41 volumes, the second, with a more modest design, of 82 half-volumes. Having broken its expensive publication by half, the company made it more accessible to a wide audience of readers, thanks to which the circulation was brought to a record for that time – 130,000 copies.

Many prominent scientists and philosophers were invited to the editorial board: Dmitri Ivanovich Mendeleev, Vladimir Sergeevich Solovyov, Semyon Afanasyevich Vengerov, Andrey Nikolaevich Beketov, Alexander Ivanovich Voeikov and many others. From that moment on, the encyclopaedia begins to replenish with original articles, and the primary attention is paid to issues related to the history, culture and geography of Russia. The displacement of translated articles by original ones and the appearance of new authors affected the very nature of the publication: from a trivial encyclopaedia it turned into a collection of the latest achievements and discoveries in all fields of science and technology.

The Encyclopaedic Dictionary was published from 1890 to 1904, with 4–5 volumes published annually. The circulation fluctuated significantly, from 12,000 copies in 1890 to 25,000 in 1897. Semi-volumes 54 and 55, containing an extensive description of Russia (1899), were published in a circulation of 35 thousand copies. The large circulation determined the wide distribution of the dictionary on the market, despite the rather high price.

By 1907, four additional half-volumes were published, edited by Vladimir Timofeyevich Shevyakov and Arseniev. This also included all the most significant of what, for various reasons, had been omitted in previous volumes or appeared after the encyclopaedia was published. The 82nd half-volume ends with the "Portrait Gallery" of the editors and employees of the Encyclopaedic Dictionary, comprising 300 portrait-prototypes: from the editor-in-chief to a simple typesetter.

Simultaneously, in 1899–1902, the Small Encyclopaedic Dictionary of Brockhaus and Efron was published in three volumes; in 1907–1909, its second edition was published in four volumes.

In 1911, the New Encyclopaedic Dictionary was published, edited by Konstantin Konstantinovich Arseniev, which was supposed to cover the same circle of knowledge as ESBE, but in a more compact and modern processing. In 1916, because of wartime difficulties, the publication of the dictionary was discontinued on the 29th volume of the originally planned 48 volumes of this edition.

Illustrations from the Brockhaus and Efron Encyclopedic Dictionary

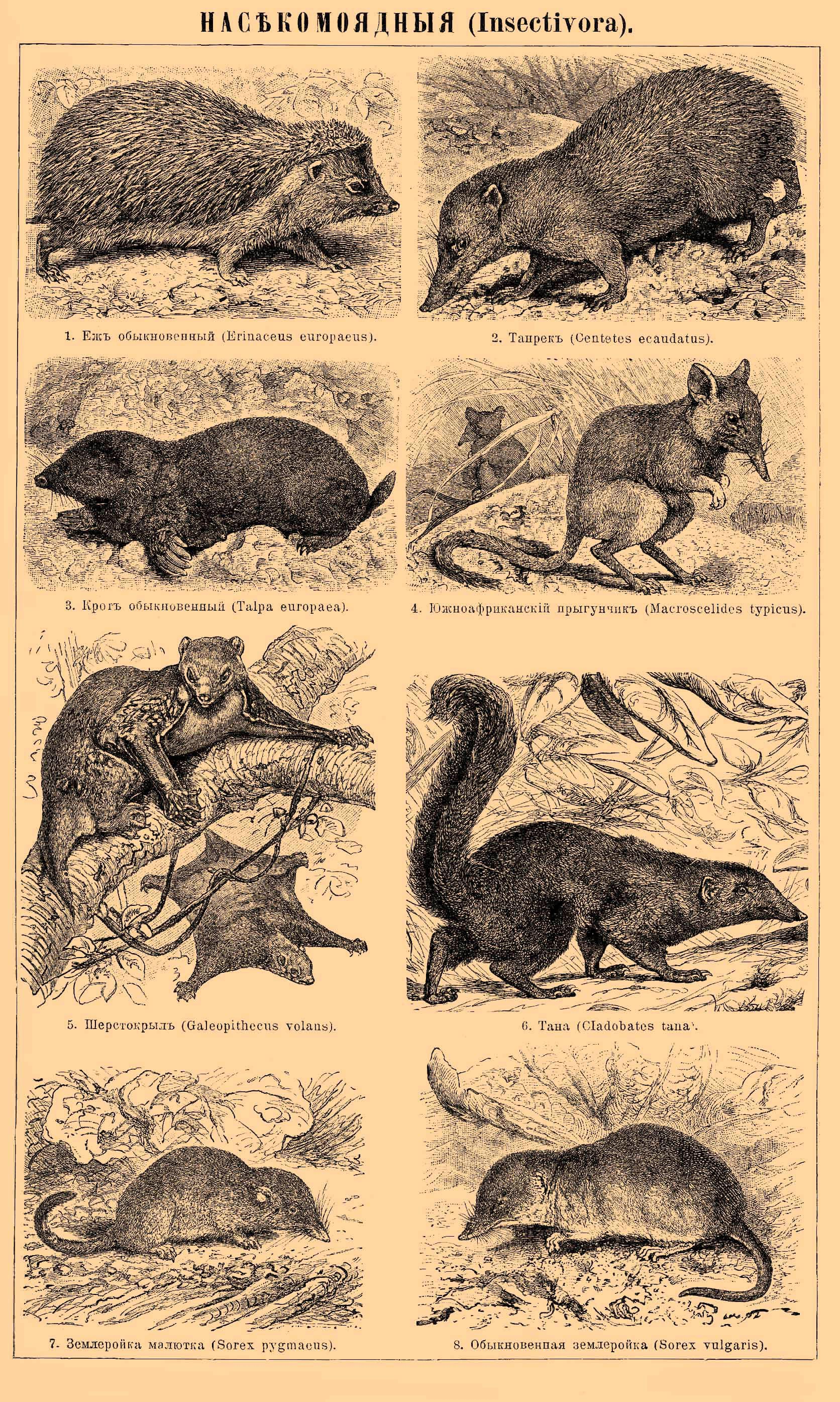
"Insectivora"

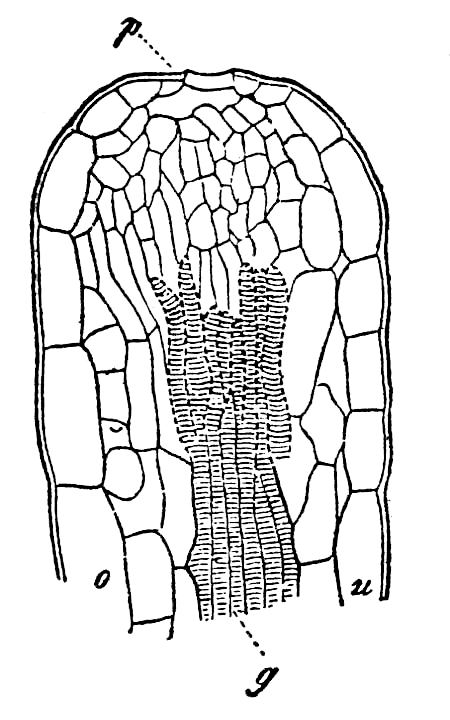
A section of hydathode in the leaf of Primula sinensis

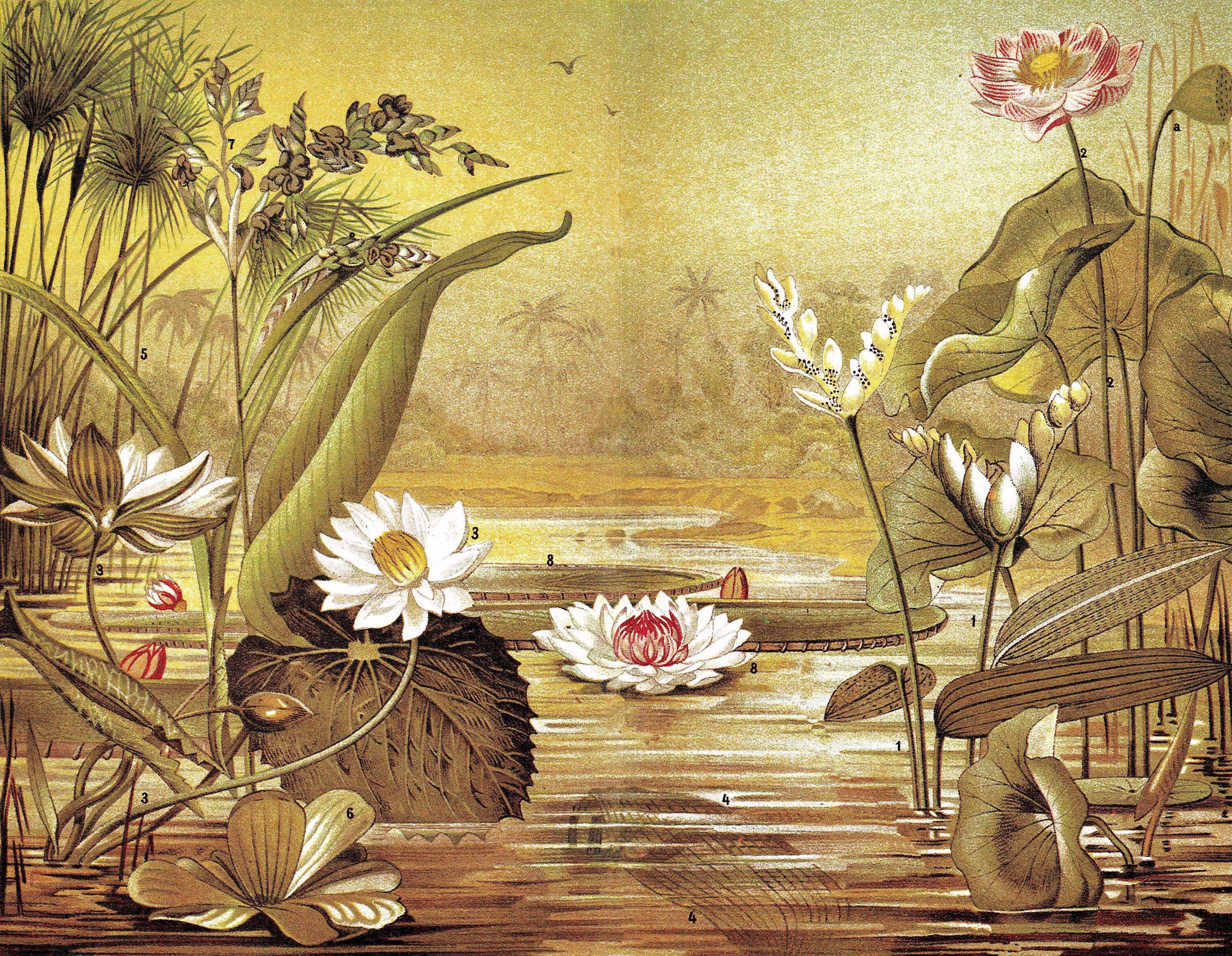
Aponogeton madagascariensis

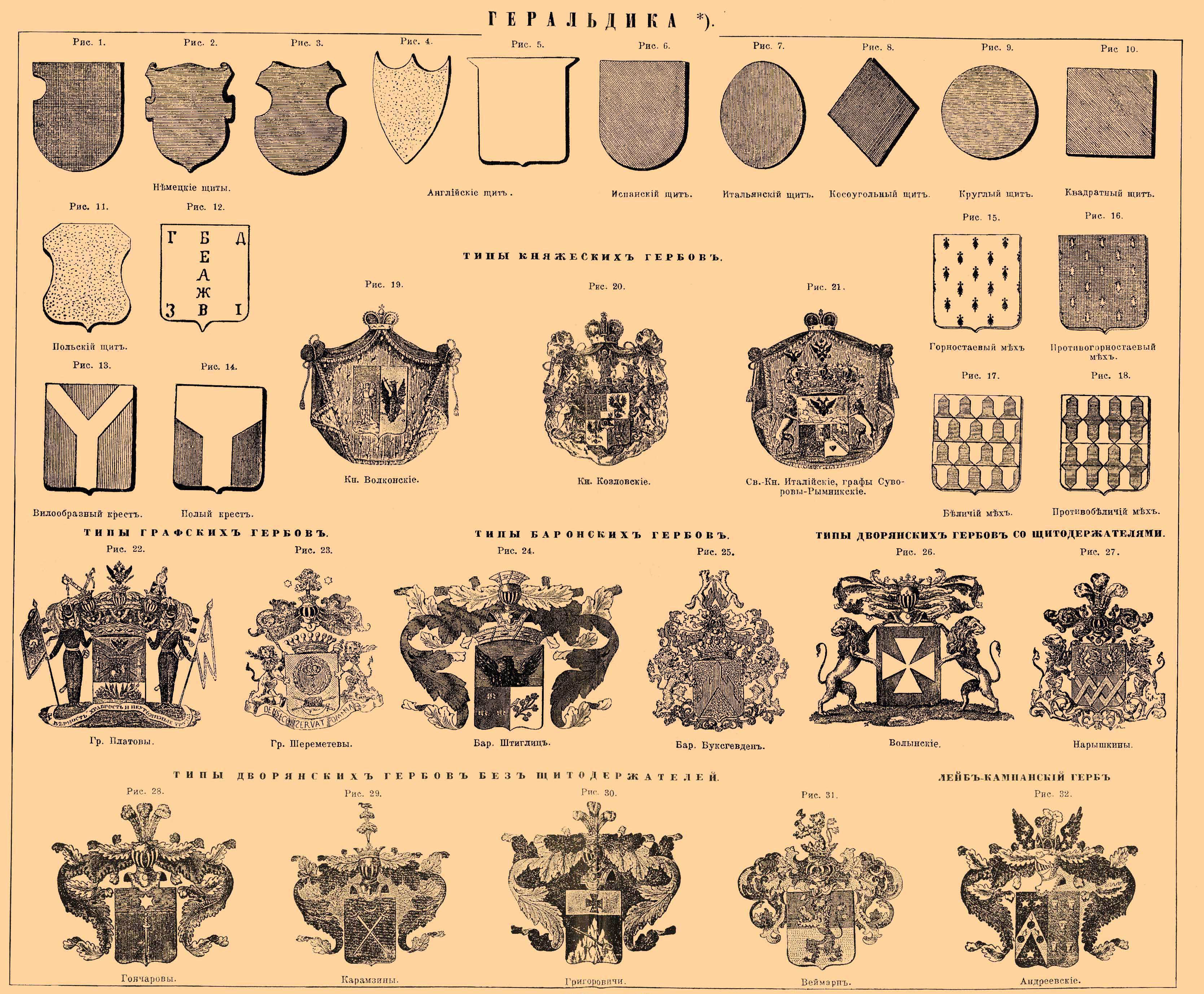
"Coat of arms"

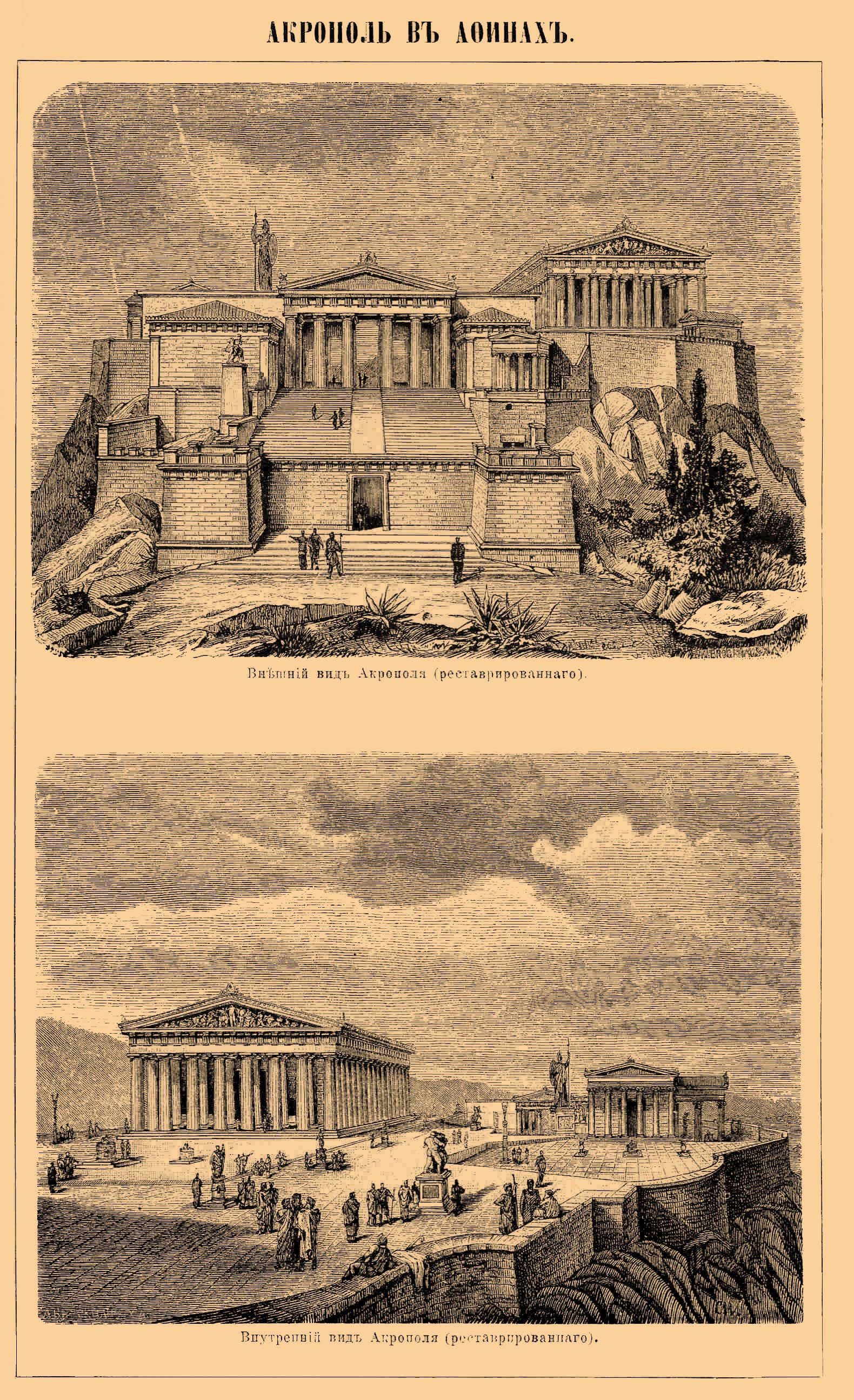
"Acropolis"

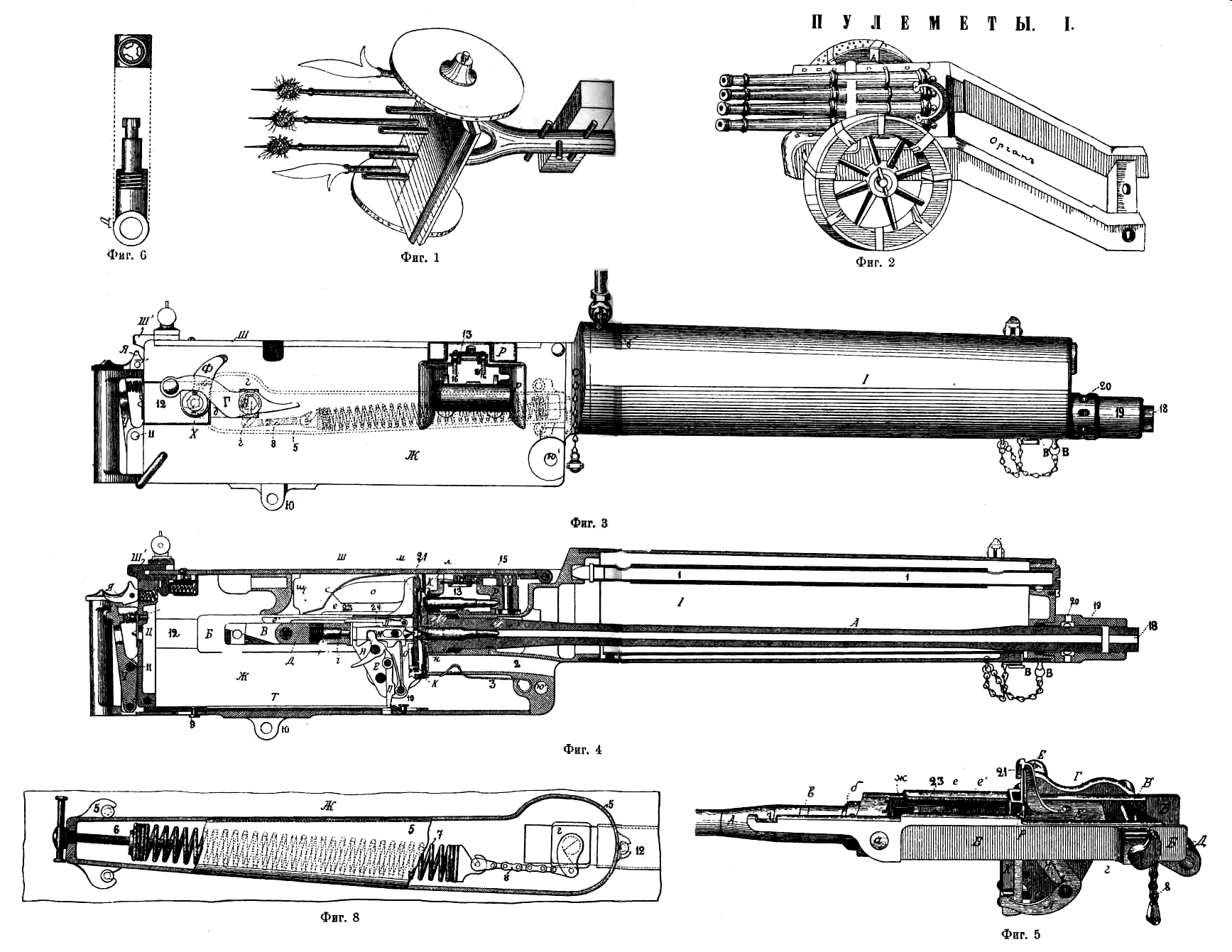
Illustration of the Maxim gun

== See also ==
- Brockhaus Enzyklopädie
- Granat Encyclopedic Dictionary
