= Aponogeton azureus =

Conservation status
- Vulnerable (IUCN 3.1)

Scientific classification
- Kingdom: Plantae
- Clade: Embryophytes
- Clade: Tracheophytes
- Clade: Spermatophytes
- Clade: Angiosperms
- Clade: Monocots
- Order: Alismatales
- Family: Aponogetonaceae
- Genus: Aponogeton
- Species: A. azureus

Binomial name
- Aponogeton azureus H.Bruggen

Species of aquatic plant

Aponogeton azureus is a species of plant in the Aponogetonaceae family. It is endemic to Namibia. Its natural habitat is freshwater marshes. It is threatened by habitat loss.

== Overview ==
Aponogeton azureus is known only from the type locality. The species has been sought since it was first collected in 1974, but has not been found again.) It is assessed as Data Deficient because it is taxonomically uncertain.

If A. azureus proves to be a valid species, it may be considered Critically Endangered as it is known only known from one pool in the Northwest of Namibia and pools in this area are known to be over-utilised and trampled by livestock.
