= Carex adrienii =

Scientific classification
- Kingdom: Plantae
- Clade: Embryophytes
- Clade: Tracheophytes
- Clade: Spermatophytes
- Clade: Angiosperms
- Clade: Monocots
- Clade: Commelinids
- Order: Poales
- Family: Cyperaceae
- Genus: Carex
- Species: C. adrienii

Binomial name
- Carex adrienii E.G. Camus

Species of plant

Carex adrienii, known in China as guang dong tai cao, is a tussock-forming species of perennial sedge in the family Cyperaceae. It is native from southern China in the north to Vietnam in the south.

== Description ==
The sedge has a sub-woody rhizome with tufted hairy lateral culms that are 30 to 50 cm (12 to 20 in) in length and 1 to 2 mm (0.039 to 0.079 in) and have a triangular cross-section. The bases of the culms are covered with leafless pale brown sheaths. They are found at the base and along the length of the stem. The tufted leaves at the base are shorter than the culms and have an elliptic-linear to narrowly elliptic shape with a length of 25 to 35 cm (9.8 to 13.8 in) and a width of 2 to 3 cm (0.79 to 1.18 in) and have spots and lines that are rough in texture.

== Taxonomy ==
The species was first described in 1912 by the French botanist Edmond Gustave Camus as a part of the work Flore Générale de l'Indo-Chine. There are three synonyms;

- Carex chienii F.T.Wang & Tang
- Carex kwangtungensis F.T.Wang & Tang
- Carex scaposa var. baviensis Franch.

== Distribution ==
C. adrienii is found in wet tropical areas of southern China, Vietnam and Laos.

== See also ==
- List of Carex species
