= Aponogeton longiplumulosus =

Scientific classification
- Kingdom: Plantae
- Clade: Tracheophytes
- Clade: Angiosperms
- Clade: Monocots
- Order: Alismatales
- Family: Aponogetonaceae
- Genus: Aponogeton
- Species: A. longiplumulosus

Binomial name
- Aponogeton longiplumulosus H. Bruggen

Species of aquatic plant

Aponogeton longiplumulosus is a submerged aquatic plant that is native to Madagascar. It possesses an elongated rhizome 2–3 cm in diameter. The leaves are an olive green-brown, 8 - 14 inches (20–35 cm) long and 2.5 inches (6 cm) broad, with a fluted margin and a petiole up to about 24 inches (60 cm) long. No floating leaves are formed. New leaf colour forms have been introduced recently. The flowers are a dark violet in colour.

== Cultivation and uses ==
Aponogeton longiplumulosus is a beautiful aquarium plant and makes no special demands as to water quality though it thrives best in soft water in a medium to bright light. A rich substrate encourages growth and additional CO_{2} is beneficial. Under good conditions it will flower frequently. It does have dormant periods which last a few weeks. It is often used for larger aquariums. It is propagated by seed, but it has been reported to be difficult to germinate.
