= Carex jeanpertii =

Scientific classification
- Kingdom: Plantae
- Clade: Tracheophytes
- Clade: Angiosperms
- Clade: Monocots
- Clade: Commelinids
- Order: Poales
- Family: Cyperaceae
- Genus: Carex
- Species: C. jeanpertii

Binomial name
- Carex jeanpertii E.G. Camus

Species of plant

Carex jeanpertii is a tussock-forming species of perennial sedge in the family Cyperaceae. It is native to parts of Vietnam.

The species was first described by the French botanist Edmond Gustave Camus in 1910 as a part of the work Notulae Systematicae. Herbier du Museum de Paris.

== See also ==
- List of Carex species
