= A. natans =

A. natans is an abbreviation that may refer to:

- Ambulocetus natans, a fossil cetacean
- Atractus natans, a snake
- Aponogeton natans, a flowering plant
- Alisma natans, now called Luronium natans, a flowering plant
