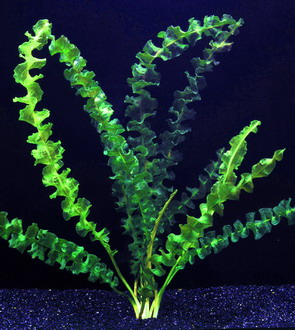

Scientific classification
- Kingdom: Plantae
- Clade: Tracheophytes
- Clade: Angiosperms
- Clade: Monocots
- Order: Alismatales
- Family: Aponogetonaceae
- Genus: Aponogeton
- Species: A. capuronii

Binomial name
- Aponogeton capuronii H.Bruggen

= Aponogeton capuronii =

Species of aquatic plant

Aponogeton capuronii (named after René Paul Raymond Capuron) is an aquatic plant found in southeastern Madagascar.

== Description ==
Aponogeton capuronii has a rhizome up to 10 x 2-cm thick. Leaf blade 7–20 cm long petiolate, slightly leathery, 20–40 cm long and 3-4.5(-8) cm wide, flat or highly bullate and undulate, dark olive-green coloring. Apex acute, base round, cuneate or slightly cordate. Peduncle 40-60(-300) cm long, swollen toward the inflorescence. Spathe up to 1.5 cm long, caducous. Inflorescence with 2, seldom 3 up to 14 cm long spikes with omnilateral flowers; 2 white tepals; 6 stamens; 3-4 carpels with 2(-4) ovules each. Fruit about 6x3 mm in size, with a terminal beak. Seeds up to 3.25 x 1.5 mm in size, simple testa (van Bruggen, 1985).

== Culture ==
A decorative Aponogeton, though with limited adaptability to living conditions in the aquarium. It was imported on a few occasions, but successful cultivation was the exception. A specimen featuring bullate leaf blades has been cultivated successfully for more than 20 years by J. Bogner in the Botanical Gardens Munich. The plant is kept in soft, weak acid water in a shaded location. According to this data, Aponogeton capuronii does not require a specific rest phase.

== Ecology ==
The species grows in rivers with fast-flowing water. In February 1968, Bogner discovered plants in the Mandromondromotra River (Madagascar) in a depth of 20–30 cm. When the author visited this location in December 1986, the river had a water level of nearly 2 m. The plants had hardly any juvenile leaves, which hinted at limited growth activity. Water values of this location were as follows: temperature 27.3 °C (air 30 °C at 13:30 h), pH 6.0, GH/KH < 1 °dH, Fe2+ = 0.05 mg/1, NOj not detectable. The substrate consisted of sand and gravel mixed with coarse, yellow clay.

== Other ==
Forms specific to some locations and featuring bullate, undulate and flat blades have been identified.
