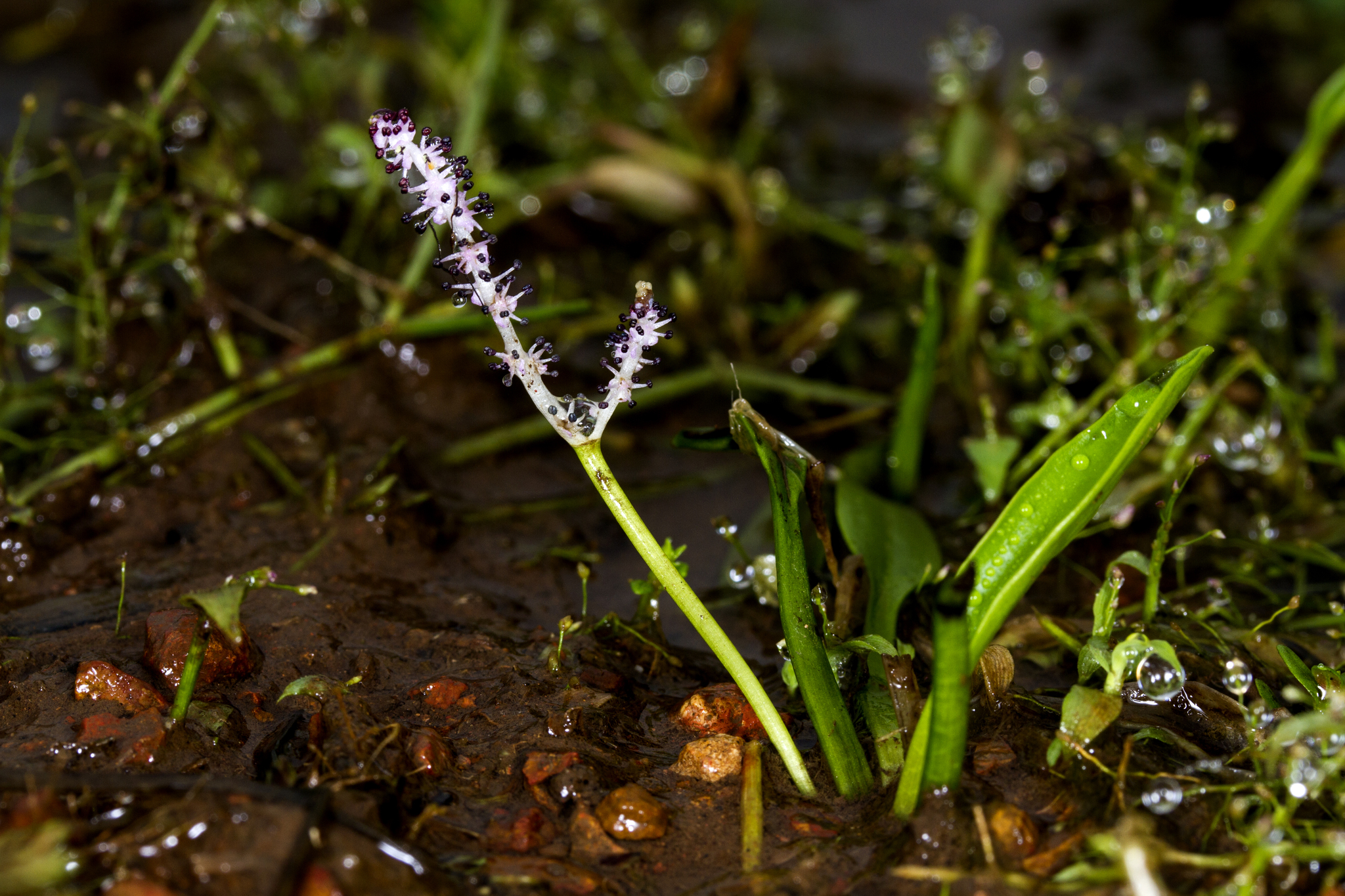

Conservation status
- Endangered (IUCN 3.1)

Scientific classification
- Kingdom: Plantae
- Clade: Tracheophytes
- Clade: Angiosperms
- Clade: Monocots
- Order: Alismatales
- Family: Aponogetonaceae
- Genus: Aponogeton
- Species: A. satarensis

Binomial name
- Aponogeton satarensis Sundararagh., A.R.Kulk. & S.R.Yadav

= Aponogeton satarensis =

Species of plant

Aponogeton satarensis is a species of aquatic herb in the family Aponogetonaceae endemic to the northern Western Ghats (Maharashtra) of India. It is sometimes commonly known as the Satara lace plant. In Marathi it is known as "y-tura" (वायतुरा). Another common name is Satara aponogeton.

== Description ==
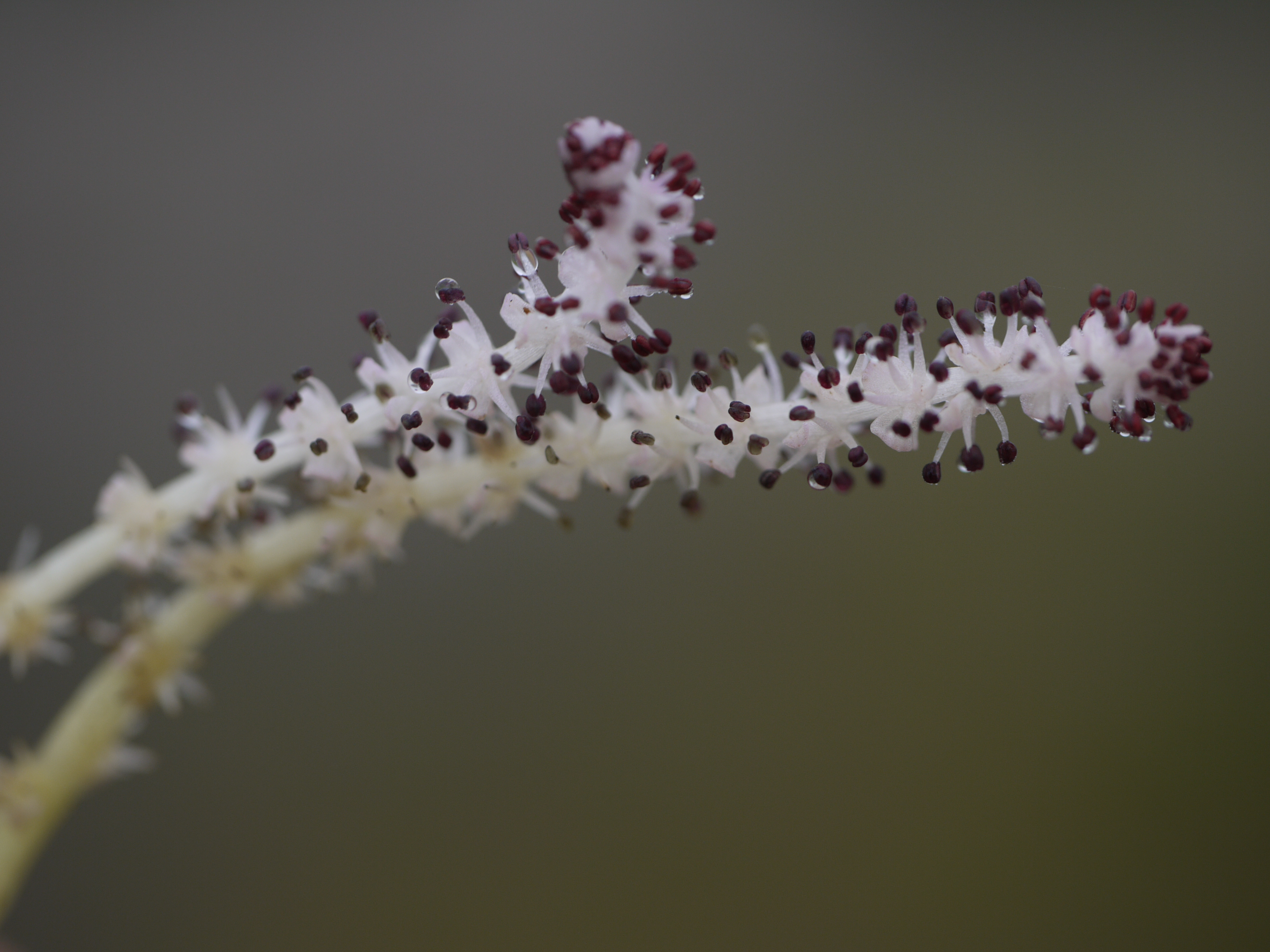

Aponogeton satarensis is a scapigerous, tuberous herb. It is an annual aquatic plant, typically reaching heights of 10–25 cm. It is dioecious, with root tubers that are globose or ellipsoid, measuring 14–16 mm across. The plant features dioecious spikes, forked and purple in color. Male inflorescences are 5–7 cm long with purple tepals that fade to rose or pale white. Stamens are typically 5-6 and measure 2 mm in length. Female inflorescences are shorter, ranging from 2.5 to 3.5 cm, with purple carpels containing 2 ovules per carpel. Fruiting peduncles can grow up to 12 cm long, bearing 1-2 seeds.

== Range ==
Aponogeton satarensis is endemic and native to India. It has been observed in various locations including Mhavashi (the type locality), Kas, Patan ferricretes in Satara district, and Gothane ferricrete in the Western Ghats, which is part of Ratnagiri district. Additionally, it's also been recorded at the Chalkewadi plateau in Satara district, Maharashtra, and is known to inhabit the Amboli area in Maharashtra as well.

== Habitat and ecology ==
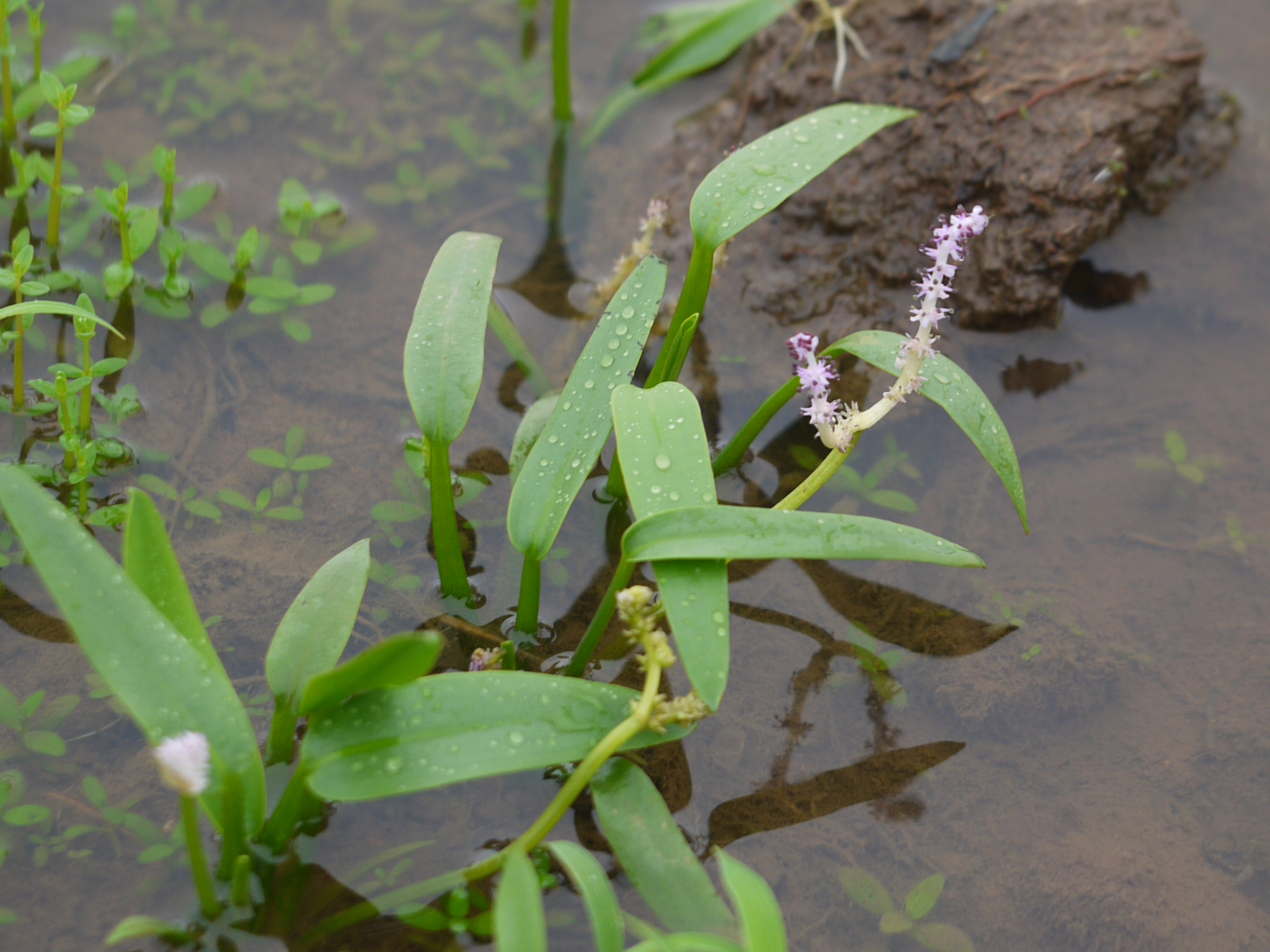

Aponogeton satarensis is typically found in temporary ponds and puddles alongside other hydrophytes such as Eriocaulon, Rotala, Myriophyllum, and Pogostemon. It flowers and fruits between June and August with its inflorescence emerging above the water. It closely resembles A. decaryi Jumelle but differs in several aspects, including similar sexes, longer and narrower lamina, purple tepals, longer fruiting inflorescence, and larger fruits.

== Etymology ==
It is named after Satara district, Maharashtra, where the species is found abundantly.
