= Voeykov axis =

Atmospheric feature

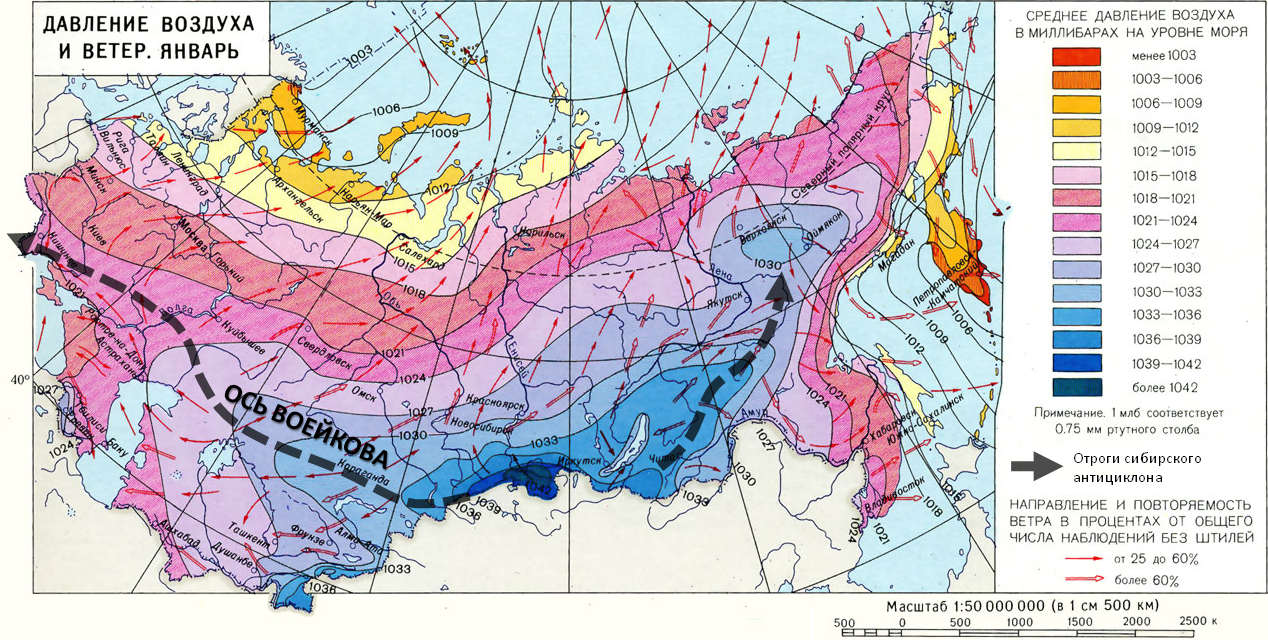
Voeykov axis on the map of the USSR

Voeykov axis (or Voeikov axis) is the axial portion (ridge) of a high atmospheric pressure band stretching across Eurasia roughly along the 50th parallel. It was named in honor of Alexander Voeikov, a climatologist, who studied this phenomenon.

The formation of the Voeykov axis is due to the continental climate in the hinterland of Eurasia. In winter, the territory of Mongolia and Siberia experience strong cooling. This leads to the formation of stable high atmospheric pressure, known as the Siberian anticyclone. The huge size of the continent, and also the relief of the earth's surface contributes to the ridge formation. In Tuva, Mongolia, and to the north are vast basins and valleys, surrounded by high mountain ranges. In winter, they cool air and stagnation occurs, that favors the growth of atmospheric pressure.

On the territory of Mongolia and southern Siberia the high-pressure region diverges in two spurs in two directions - to the north and west. To the north, extends the East Siberian anticyclone. It involves a clear, quiet and extreme freezing weather, which is set in the winter in the vast eastern Siberia. West departs Voeykov axis, which can be traced on the territory of Kazakhstan and in the south of the East European Plain. It extends approximately along the line Kyzyl – Oral – Saratov – Kharkiv – Chișinău. To the west of Moldova, it continues, gradually weakening, down to the South of France, where there is already an action of another center of high pressure - Azores anticyclone.

During winter in Eurasia the Voeykov axis plays an important climate role as a major winds separator. In winter, the north of the axis is dominated by western and south-westerly winds. In the north of the East European Plain effect Voeykov axis emphasizes the Icelandic Low. Their proximity enhances here westerly transport carrying wet and relatively warm air masses. To the south of the axis Voeykov blow northeasterly and easterly winds. They are cold and dry continental air of temperate latitudes of the Siberian High.

In summer, high pressure over the maximum Mongolia disappears. This Voeykov axis is stored in a weakened state, but loses its wind separating value. During this period it is no longer supported by the Siberian anticyclone, and the Azores anticyclone, from which the east moving anticyclones.
