= Aponogeton boivinianus =

Scientific classification
- Kingdom: Plantae
- Clade: Tracheophytes
- Clade: Angiosperms
- Clade: Monocots
- Order: Alismatales
- Family: Aponogetonaceae
- Genus: Aponogeton
- Species: A. boivinianus

Binomial name
- Aponogeton boivinianus Baill. ex Jum.

Species of aquatic plant

Aponogeton boivinianus is a species of flowering plant in the Aponogetonaceae family. It is Native to Madagascar

== Description ==
From a round, flattened tuber, arise a rosette of broad, elongated leaves on short stems. The leaves have an attractive indented surface and are a dark, rather transparent green in colour. It reaches a height of about 24 inches (60 cm).

== Cultivation and uses ==
Cultivated as an aquarium plant where it seems to prefer rather cooler water than the other species from this region. Prefers very clean water and a good substrate to grow in.

Propagation is from seeds.
