= Aponogeton abyssinicus =

Scientific classification
- Kingdom: Plantae
- Clade: Tracheophytes
- Clade: Angiosperms
- Clade: Monocots
- Order: Alismatales
- Family: Aponogetonaceae
- Genus: Aponogeton
- Species: A. abyssinicus

Binomial name
- Aponogeton abyssinicus Hochst. ex A.Rich.

Synonyms
- Aponogeton leptostachyus var. abyssinicus (Hochst. ex A.Rich.) Engler & Krause; Aponogeton leptostachyus var. minor Baker; Aponogeton boehmii Engler; Ouvirandra hildebrandtii Eichler; Aponogeton braunii Krause; Aponogeton blongus A.Peter

Species of aquatic plant

Aponogeton abyssinicus is an amphibious plant found in east and central Africa, from Ethiopia to Malawi and Zaire. Root stock tuberous or oblong, up to 2.5 cm diameter. Submersed leaves initially strap-shaped, up to 12 cm long and 6 mm wide, continuing lanceolate to obovate, up to 8.5 cm long, 2.6 cm wide and up to 10 cm long petiolate. Blade thin and slightly transparent, with a narrowing or decurrent base and acute or obtuse apex. Adults floating, up to 50 cm long petiolate. Floating leaf blade linear to ovoid, rarely cordate, up to 16 cm long and 5 cm wide, usually considerably smaller. Emersed leaves shaped like the floating leaves, slightly leathery and shorter petiolate. Peduncle up to 45 cm long, angled, dark red to green coloration, slightly pubescent underwater, almost glabrous above water, not swollen under the inflorescence. Spathe 1.0-1.6 cm long, caducous. Inflorescence featuring two 1.5-5-cm long spikes with omni-lateral flowers; 2 tepals, violet or white coloration; 6 stamens (none in apomictic plants); 3 carpels (up to 7 in apomictic plants). Fruit up to 7 x 2.75 mm large, with (4-) 7-10 seeds, sized 1-2 x 0.75 mm, double testa.

== Etymology ==
The specific epithet, abyssinicus, is derived from Latin and means "Abyssinian" or "Ethiopian", referring to the plant's occurrence there.

== Ecology ==
Aponogeton abyssinicus populates shallow, usually temporary waters up to an altitude of 2,700 metres (8,900 ft). White-flowering plants (usually violet-flowering) were collected by the author in the Selous Game Reserve, Tanzania, where very few specimens were located only on the edges of a permanent water in shallow depth, occasionally also completely emersed in a moist substrate.

== Cultivation ==
Aponogeton abyssinicus is a rarely imported plant, the maintenance of which is entirely possible in an aquarium. For cultivation, preferably soft water as well as nutrient-rich and loose substrate is recommended. The best water temperature is 24–28 °C (75–82 °F). In the aquarium, the white-flowering form of A. abyssinicus forms a 15 cm wide and 10 cm tall rosette consisting of light green leaves, so that it may be considered for the foreground. The floating leaves, which only rarely form in aquariums, should be removed so that the later leaves will again remain short petiolate. An emersed or semi-aquatic keeping is possible under conditions of high humidity. Best cultivation results are achieved in shallow water. Propagation can occur only sexually through the very tiny seeds. Though they mostly germinate well, the rearing of the young plant is, in fact, extremely difficult and requires a lot of effort.
