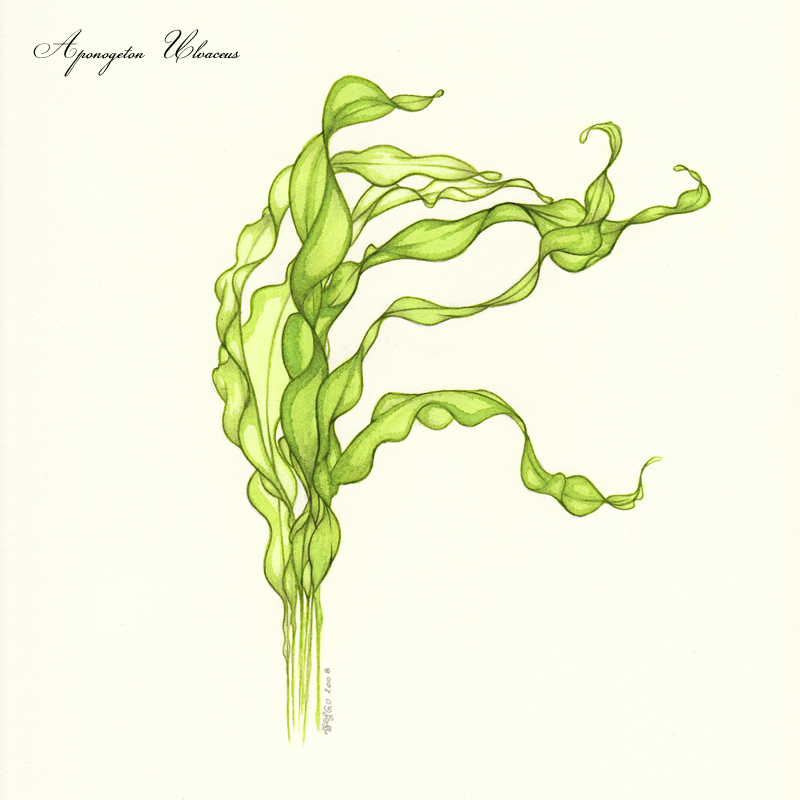

Conservation status
- Near Threatened (IUCN 3.1)

Scientific classification
- Kingdom: Plantae
- Clade: Tracheophytes
- Clade: Angiosperms
- Clade: Monocots
- Order: Alismatales
- Family: Aponogetonaceae
- Genus: Aponogeton
- Species: A. ulvaceus

Binomial name
- Aponogeton ulvaceus Baker

Synonyms
- Aponogeton ambongensis Jum. Aponogeton violaceus Lagerh.

= Aponogeton ulvaceus =

Species of aquatic plant

Aponogeton ulvaceus is a submerged aquatic plant in the Aponogetonaceae family. It has a small cone shaped, slightly hairy rhizome about 30 mm (1 1/4 in) in diameter. The leaf blades have a base that tapers gradually, pale green in colour (reddish under intense light), over 50 cm (20 in) long and 8 cm (3 in) broad, with a wavy margin on petioles of an equal length, and in appearance slightly translucent. A single bulb may produce up to forty leaves in good conditions. No floating leaves are formed. The yellow flowers are produced on one or two, and sometimes more, erect spikes.

== Origin ==
It is distributed throughout central and northern Madagascar. In the wild, the plant is permanently submerged and grows in both still and moving waters and sunny and partially shaded environments.

== Facts ==
- From a single stem, a single root may produce more than 40 leaves 30–60 cm long.
- Aponogeton flowers spread out and consume everything in their path since they develop so quickly and for such a long period. Consequently, one or two aponogeton blooms in your aquarium may be able to act as a waste collecting system.
- Aponogeton is so popular with Betta fish that they are often called Betta bulbs.
- Aponogeton ulvaceus comes in various varieties, some of which need a latent period during which the root does not come from leaves to flourish.
- Scavengers and detrivores benefit from the dead leaves that fall off an aponogeton bulb because they offer a rich food source.
- Aponogeton bulbs are found in Madagascar, although they may also be found in regions of Africa, Asia, and the Pacific Ocean.
- The leaves may easily reach a length of more than 12 in (30.5 cm) on average.
- Since the leaves of Aponogetons are so thick and dense, aquarium inhabitants will have plenty of hiding locations if they are placed in an aquarium. It is particularly true given how thick and dense the leaves are.
- They keep the ammonia and nitrate levels in the aquarium in balance.

== Cultivation and uses ==
Aponogeton ulvaceus will tolerate most water conditions, but will thrive in slightly alkaline water conditions (pH 6.5-7.5) and a temperature of around 22 to 28 °C (72 to 82 °F), although some are able to survive cooler temperatures. Additional CO_{2} produces more luxuriant growth. It likes a bright position but will grow in partial shade. In an aquarium it makes a very good specimen plant.

The recommended tank size for this plant is 10 gallons (≈ 38 litres). Its most popular biological filter is the under-gravel filter. An under-gravel filter is simply a plastic plate placed over the bottom of the aquarium.

A fine brush is used to pollinate the flowers. In a sand/very fine gravel compost the seeds will germinate in about one to two weeks.

Fish substrates give fish a place to live and a food source, making them a crucial component of fishkeeping. Substrates with additional nutrients can lessen the need to apply liquid fertilisers on a regular basis for bulb plants that have nutritional deficiencies. You can buy fertiliser tablets or capsules that you can place close to the roots of your plants if you don't want to change your current substrate. In order to fully bury the plants' roots, place the sprouted aponogeton blooms in the substrate. It is best to keep the non-sprouted Aponogeton's narrower end out of the substrate.

Aponogeton ulvaceus plants that are in bloom have the potential to overtake your aquarium and endanger your fish. Pruning the stems of your aponogeton bulb plants on a regular basis will help keep them healthy. Not to mention that routine pruning will help keep the level of rot in your aquarium to a bare minimum.

10w LED floodlights are the minimum recommended lights for 10 gallon tanks. With this setup, you only need as little as 6 hours a day of light. Keep in mind that higher lighting means more opportunities for the bulbs to grow, which results in pruning the bulbs more often. It also results in requiring additional feedings as a consequence of rapid growth.

If you plan on housing an aponogeton ulvaceus in a nano tank, you may need to dose a liquid carbon additive. However, if you aren't, you will only need it if you want extra growth for your bulbs.

This plant needs a lot of space because one bulb can swiftly grow up to 40 leaves, each of which can grow to be up to an inch long. If you are planting many plants, be sure to space them 2 or 3 inches apart.

All types of tanks and the animals that inhabit them may accommodate these plants. They are simple to maintain when selecting their tank mates.

The leaves are attractive to snails who can do a lot of damage to these plants in an aquarium. Perhaps dependent on origin and genetics some plants will go dormant in the winter and for several months can be kept at a lower temperature, others seem to keep growing. Many hybrids of this species are sold in the aquarium trade and the true form is probably quite rare.
