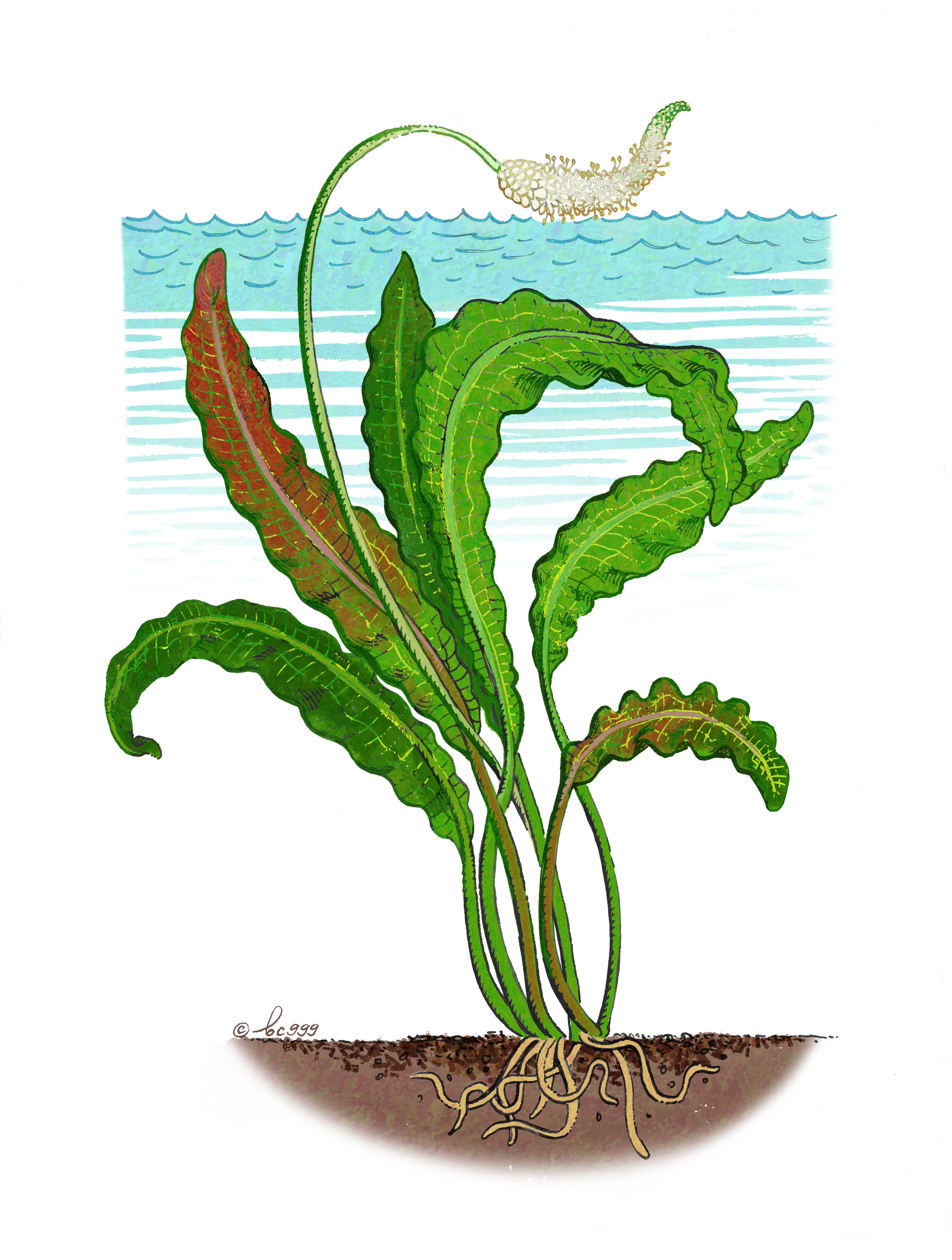

Scientific classification
- Kingdom: Plantae
- Clade: Tracheophytes
- Clade: Angiosperms
- Clade: Monocots
- Order: Alismatales
- Family: Aponogetonaceae
- Genus: Aponogeton
- Species: A. rigidifolius

Binomial name
- Aponogeton rigidifolius H. Bruggen

= Aponogeton rigidifolius =

Species of aquatic plant

Aponogeton rigidifolius is a species of freshwater plant native to Sri Lanka. In the wild it grows in deep water at temperatures of 68 to 77 °F (20 to 25 °C) in sandy soil with the water pH at 7.2.

== Description ==
The creeping rhizome is cylindrical and about 5 inches (13 cm) thick. The leaves stay submerse, are firm (almost leather-like and seem immune to most fish and snails) about 8 to 23 inches (20 to 58 centimetres) long and 1 to 1.6 inches (2.5 to 4.1 centimetres) wide. The margins of the leaves are flat to slightly undulate with a distinct midrib. In colour they are a dark green to reddish colour. The inflorescence has a single spike with white flowers and small fruits.

== Cultivation and uses ==
This species is unique amongst the Aponogetons in having an elongated rhizome rather than a tuber; the rhizome creeps along the surface, and from it new leaves sprout. This rhizome can be divided. It needs no rest period but is slow growing, though tough once established. It needs only a moderate light, tropical temperatures, and will tolerate harder water than most other Aponogetons. It is not commonly available but a good plant for the middle to background of an aquarium. It flowers rarely in aquariums.
