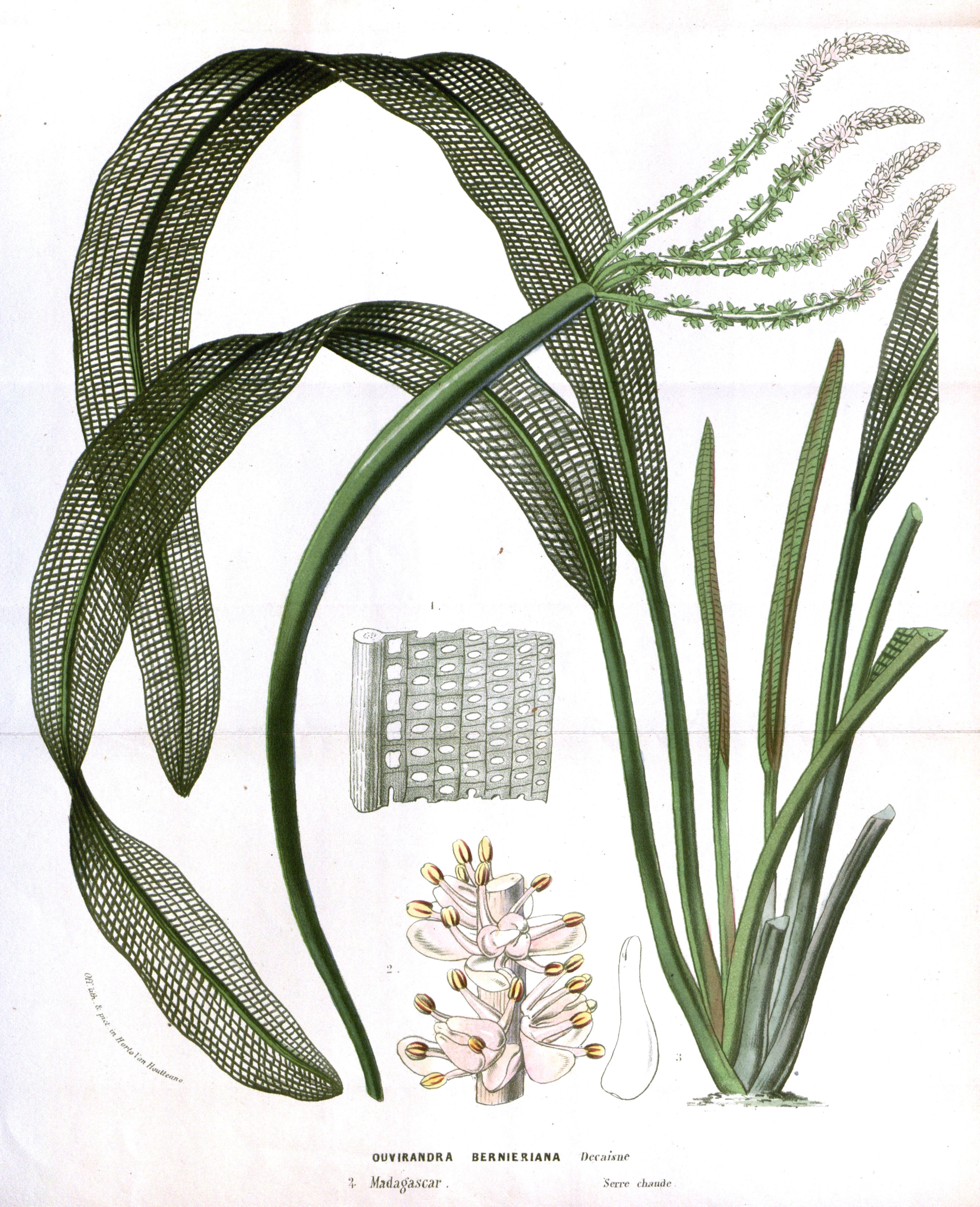

Conservation status
- Near Threatened (IUCN 3.1)

Scientific classification
- Kingdom: Plantae
- Clade: Tracheophytes
- Clade: Angiosperms
- Clade: Monocots
- Order: Alismatales
- Family: Aponogetonaceae
- Genus: Aponogeton
- Species: A. bernerianus

Binomial name
- Aponogeton bernerianus (Decne.) Hook.f.

Synonyms
- Ouvirandra bernieriana Decaisne; Aponogeton quadrangulare Baker

= Aponogeton bernierianus =

Species of aquatic plant

Aponogeton bernerianus is an aquatic plant from eastern Madagascar. It has a 3 cm thick tuber or thick and branchy rhizome. Leaf blade up to 13 cm petiolate, strap-shaped, highly bullate and undulate, up to 50(-120) cm long and 1.5-6.5(-10) cm wide, dark green coloration. Peduncle up to 75 cm long, tapering towards the inflorescence. Spathe up to 15 mm long, caducous. Inflorescence with 3-15 up to 8-cm long spikes with omnilateral flowers; 2(3) white tepals; 6 stamens; 3(4) carpels with 2 ovules each. Fruit about 10 x 7 mm. Seed about 7x4 mm in size, simple testa (van Bruggen 1985).

== Culture ==
Aponogeton bernerianus has been collected on only a few occasions. Maintenance in an aquarium is difficult and successful only in a few, rare instances. For a successful culture, the ecological conditions will have to be taken into consideration (soft, cool and strong water movement).

== Ecology ==
The species grows in rivers and streams with more or less fast-flowing water, up to an altitude of 1,200 metres (3,900 ft) in shady or sunny locations. At one location near Andasibe (Madagascar), studied by the author, flowering plants grew during the dry season in 60 cm deep, clear water. Three months later, the water level at this location measured more than 1.7 m during the wet season (the plant's rest period). The water had turned loamy and turbid and the current was ripping. A locally conducted water analysis in January 1987 during the wet season resulted in a water temperature of 20.6 °C, a pH of 5.8, as well as a total and carbonate hardness reading of less than 1 °dH.

== Other ==
Two forms are known, one featuring narrow, the other wide leaf blades. In the past flowering plants have been collected during almost every month.
