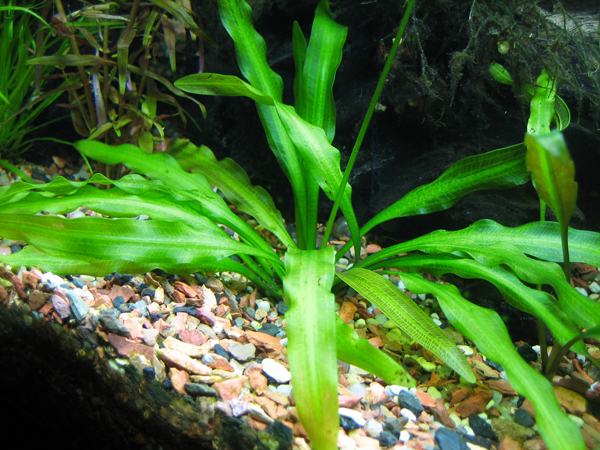
- Foliage

Scientific classification
- Kingdom: Plantae
- Clade: Tracheophytes
- Clade: Angiosperms
- Clade: Monocots
- Order: Alismatales
- Family: Aponogetonaceae
- Genus: Aponogeton
- Species: A. undulatus

Binomial name
- Aponogeton undulatus Roxb.

= Aponogeton undulatus =

Species of aquatic plant

Aponogeton undulatus is a species of aquatic plant, sometimes used in aquariums. Some taxonomists consider this should be under the name Aponogeton stachyosporus.

== Origin ==
It is originally from India, Bangladesh, Myanmar, and Sri Lanka.

== Description ==
It is a submerged aquatic plant with an ovoid rhizome about 2 inches (5 cm) long and 1 inch (2.5 cm) broad. The leaves are a very pale green, 4 to 6 inches (10 to 15 cm) long with an undulating margin on petioles of 6 inches (15 cm) length. Floating leaves are not produced by the true species but some hybrids do produce them. The flowers are produced on a single erect stem with white flowers.

== Cultivation and uses ==
Many hybrids of this species are sold in the aquarium trade. It will tolerate most water conditions. It likes a bright position but will grow in partial shade. It is a popular specimen plant for aquariums. Some plants will go dormant in the winter and for several months can be kept at a lower temperature, others seem to keep growing.

A fine brush can be used to pollinate the flowers. Seeds will germinate in a sand/very fine gravel compost covered by shallow water.
