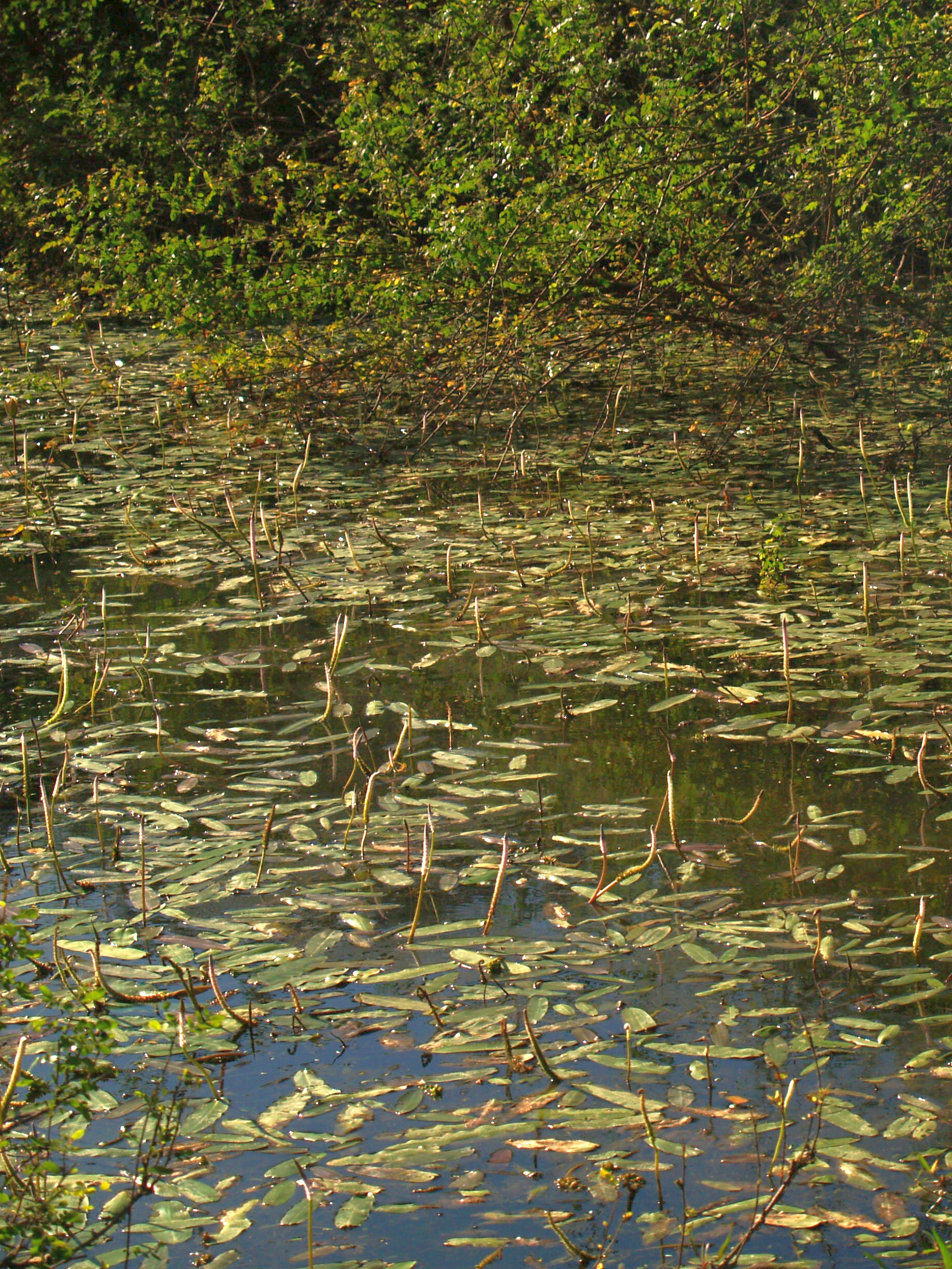

Conservation status
- Least Concern (IUCN 3.1)

Scientific classification
- Kingdom: Plantae
- Clade: Tracheophytes
- Clade: Angiosperms
- Clade: Monocots
- Order: Alismatales
- Family: Aponogetonaceae
- Genus: Aponogeton
- Species: A. natans

Binomial name
- Aponogeton natans (L.) Engl. & K.Krause

Synonyms
- Saururus natans L.; Aponogeton monostachyon L.f.; Spathium monostachyum (L.f.) Edgew.; Aponogeton lineare Vahl; Potamogeton indicus Roth ex Roem. & Schult.; Aponogeton flavidum Ham. ex Hook.f.; Aponogeton lucens Hook.f.

= Aponogeton natans =

Species of aquatic plant

Aponogeton natans is a species of aquatic plant in the family Aponogetonaceae.

== Description ==
Aponogeton natans grows as a submerged aquatic plant.

== Distribution and habitat ==
Aponogeton natans is native to India, Sri Lanka, Bangladesh and Myanmar. It grows in wetlands and rice fields.
