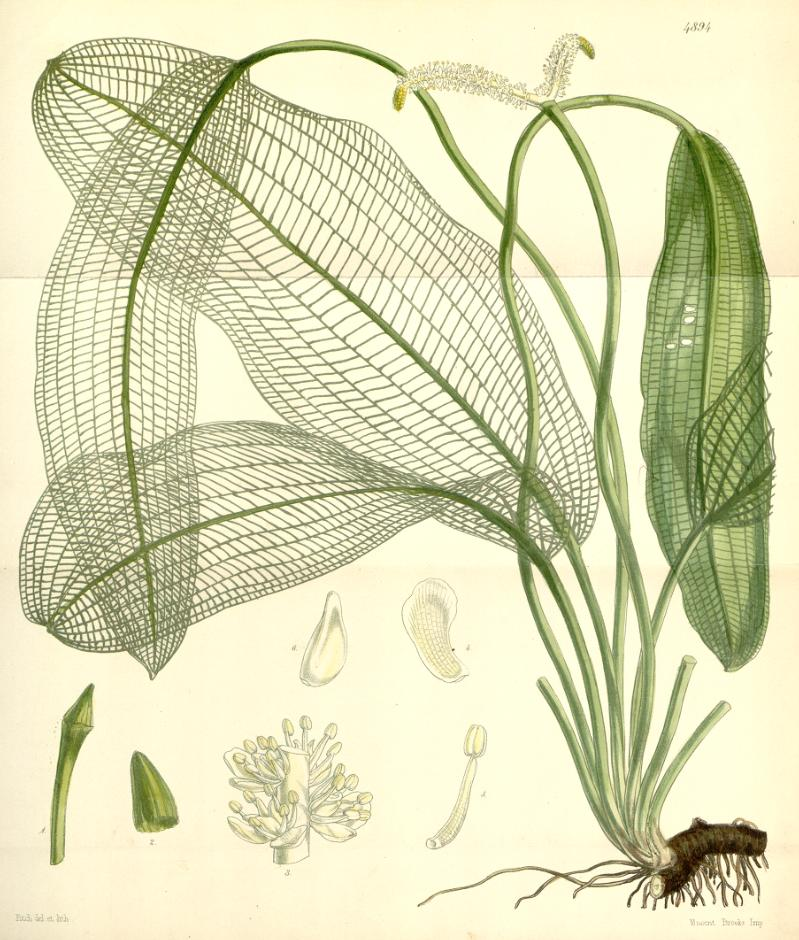

Conservation status
- Least Concern (IUCN 3.1)

Scientific classification
- Kingdom: Plantae
- Clade: Tracheophytes
- Clade: Angiosperms
- Clade: Monocots
- Order: Alismatales
- Family: Aponogetonaceae
- Genus: Aponogeton
- Species: A. madagascariensis

Binomial name
- Aponogeton madagascariensis (Mirb.) H. Bruggen
- Aponogeton madagascariensis is native to the Comoros and Madagascar. It has been introduced to Mauritius.

Synonyms
- Urirandra madagascariensis Mirb.; Aponogeton fenestralis (Pers.) Hook.f.; Aponogeton fenestralis var. major Baum; Aponogeton guillotii Hochr.; Aponogeton henkelianus Baum; Aponogeton madagascariensis var. henkelianus (Baum) H.Bruggen; Aponogeton madagascariensis var. major (Baum) H.Bruggen; Hydrogeton fenestralis Pers.; Urirandra fenestralis (Pers.) Poir.

= Aponogeton madagascariensis =

Species of aquatic plant

Aponogeton madagascariensis is commonly known as Madagascar laceleaf, lattice leaf or lace plant. It is an aquatic plant native to Madagascar in the family Aponogetonaceae popularly sold for use in aquariums.

== Description ==
It is an aquatic monocotyledonous perennial plant with tuberous rhizomes 3 centimetres (1.2 in) in diameter. The leaves are oblong, the leaf blade 15–55 cm long and from 5–16 cm broad, with a total leaf length including the petiole of up to 65 centimetres (26 in). The leaves spread horizontally beneath the surface of the water, and are little more than a lattice-like skeletal network of veins with no tissue between. The flowers are produced on an erect, two-pronged spike up to 1 metre (39 in) long, protruding up to 20 centimetres (7.9 in) above the water surface, with a white bract protecting each flower. There seem to be several forms of this plant in cultivation, some large, some much smaller.

== Cultivation and uses ==
The tuberous roots are edible. It requires water temperatures of 15-26 °C and pH of 5-7.5, growing best in low light outdoors. The substrate should be rich in nutrients.

It is a speciality in botanical gardens all over the world. It was once in such high demand that it came close to extinction in its natural habitat in Madagascar.

A. madagascariensis is often regarded as a difficult plant to cultivate. This is due to several factors: 1) it needs bright indoor light to thrive; this encourages the growth of algae on the lattice-like leaves; which is difficult to remove; 2) newly imported bulbs grow well in their first year, but often fail in their second year, apparently due to a lack of food storage in the bulbs (cause still unknown); 3) seeds may be produced, but often fail to germinate or thrive. Some enthusiasts recommend strong water movement and a high filtration rate for this plant.
