= Blanche-Augustine Camus =

French painter

Blanche-Augustine Camus (27 October 1884 – 1968) was a French neo-impressionist painter, associated with the style of Divisionism, noted for her luminous landscapes and gardens of the south of France, often combined with graceful outdoor portraits of her family and friends.

Born in Paris, she studied at the Académie Julian and the École des Beaux-Arts from 1902 to 1908 with Tony Robert-Fleury, Jules Joseph Lefebvre and Adolphe Déchenaud. She first exhibited at the Salon des Artistes Français in 1911, winning the gold medal in 1920, and continuing until 1939.

Her work first appeared at the Galerie Georges Petit in 1912 and received an enthusiastic review from André Warnod in Comoedia: "Des toiles tout illuminées de soleil, un soleil chaud, vibrand, réchauffant, qui resplendit sur les fleurs rouge des jardins, éclate en grandes taches de lumière sur le sable des allées." ("These canvases are illuminated by the sun, a warm, vibrant warming sun shining on the red flowers of the gardens, bursting into large pools of light on the sand of the paths.") She also exhibited at the Bernheim-Jeune gallery.

She moved to Saint-Tropez in 1908 and from then on mostly worked in southern France, where she was associated with Henri-Jean Guillaume Martin and André Dunoyer de Segonzac.

She was made a Chevalier of the Légion d'honneur.

== Family ==
Camus was the daughter of the pharmacist and botanist Edmond Gustave Camus (1852–1915), known for his work with orchids. Her sister was the botanist Aimée Antoinette Camus (1879–1965). Throughout her life she remained close to her sister, and after their father's death in 1915, the sisters explored the Pyrénées, and joined expeditions around the Mediterranean region including Turkey.

== Sale room and collections ==
Paintings by Blanche Camus appear regularly in the sale room. The record for a work by the artist, held by Christie's, London, for Harvest in Provence (sold for 28,617 euros in 2003), was broken by Pique-nique au jardin (Tea in the Garden, 1920), sold in Barcelona in February 2019 for 94,965 euros.

Paintings by the artist are held by the Museum of Fine Arts and Archeology of Besançon, Musée Denon in Chalon-sur-Saône, Musée de la Chartreuse de Douai, Museum of Fine Arts of Lyon, Musée des Beaux-Arts de Nice and Musée des Beaux-Arts de Pau.
