= Alexander Voeikov =

Russian meteorologist and climatologist (1842–1916)

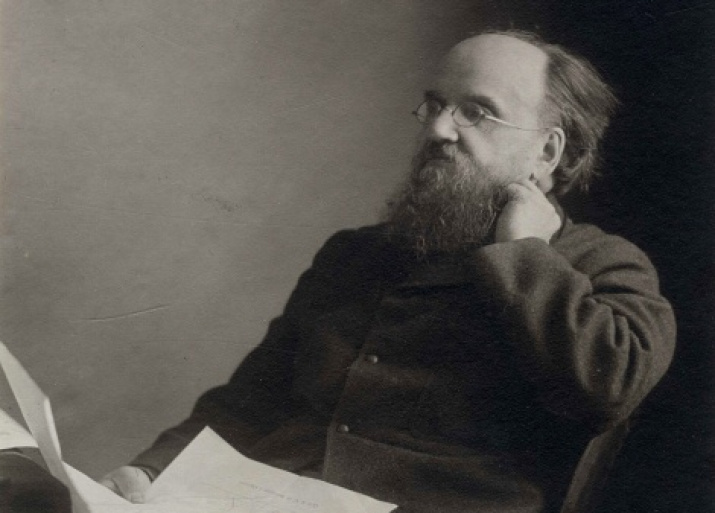

Alexander Ivanovich Voeikov (Александр Иванович Воейков, 20 May 1842 – 9 February 1916) was a Russian meteorologist and climatologist who was involved in establishing meteorological stations across Russia. He took an interest in the interconnection of meteorological processes and long term climate. He described a Siberian high pressure area extending into South West Europe which is known as the Voeikov Axis.

== Biography ==
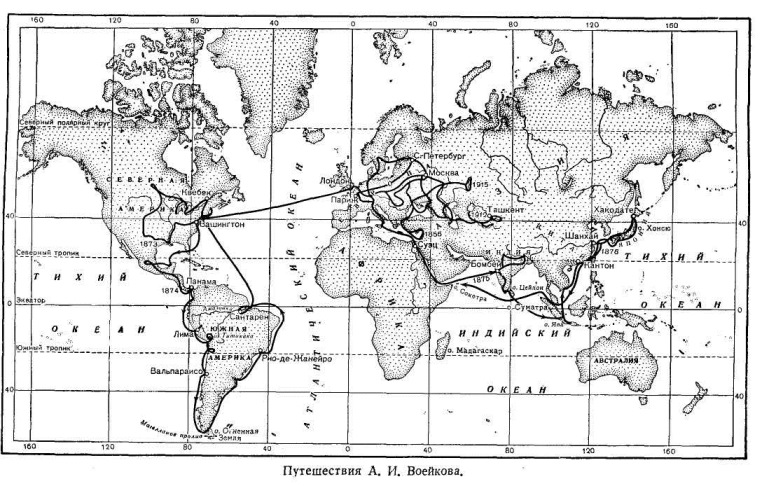
Travels of Voeikov

Voeikov was born in Moscow to Ivan Fedorovich but orphaned at the age of five, he was raised by his maternal uncle D. D. Mervago. He was educated at St. Petersburg University followed by work at universities at Heidelberg, Berlin, and finally at Göttingen where he obtained a doctorate in 1865 with a thesis on Über die direkte Insolation und Strahlung an verschiedenen Orten der Erdoberfläche. After travels around Europe, North America and Asia, he became a secretary to the meteorological commission and in 1870 he was involved in organizing a system of meteorological stations. In 1887 he became a professor at St Petersburg University. He founded the journal Meteorologicheskü vestnik in 1891. Among Voeikov's contributions were the use of budgets of evaporation, inflow and outflow of rivers to examine trends. Based on such studies he predicted that the Aral Sea could dry up. He however believed that the inflowing rivers needed to be utilized as the Aral Sea was merely drying up the water. The so-called Voeikov Axis of high pressure from Siberia to southwestern Europe is named after him. He was elected to the Russian Geographical Society in 1908. Voeikov was also a proponent of vegetarianism, heading the St. Petersburg Vegetarian Society.

Voeikov is buried at the Nikolskoe Cemetery of the Alexander Nevsky Lavra.
