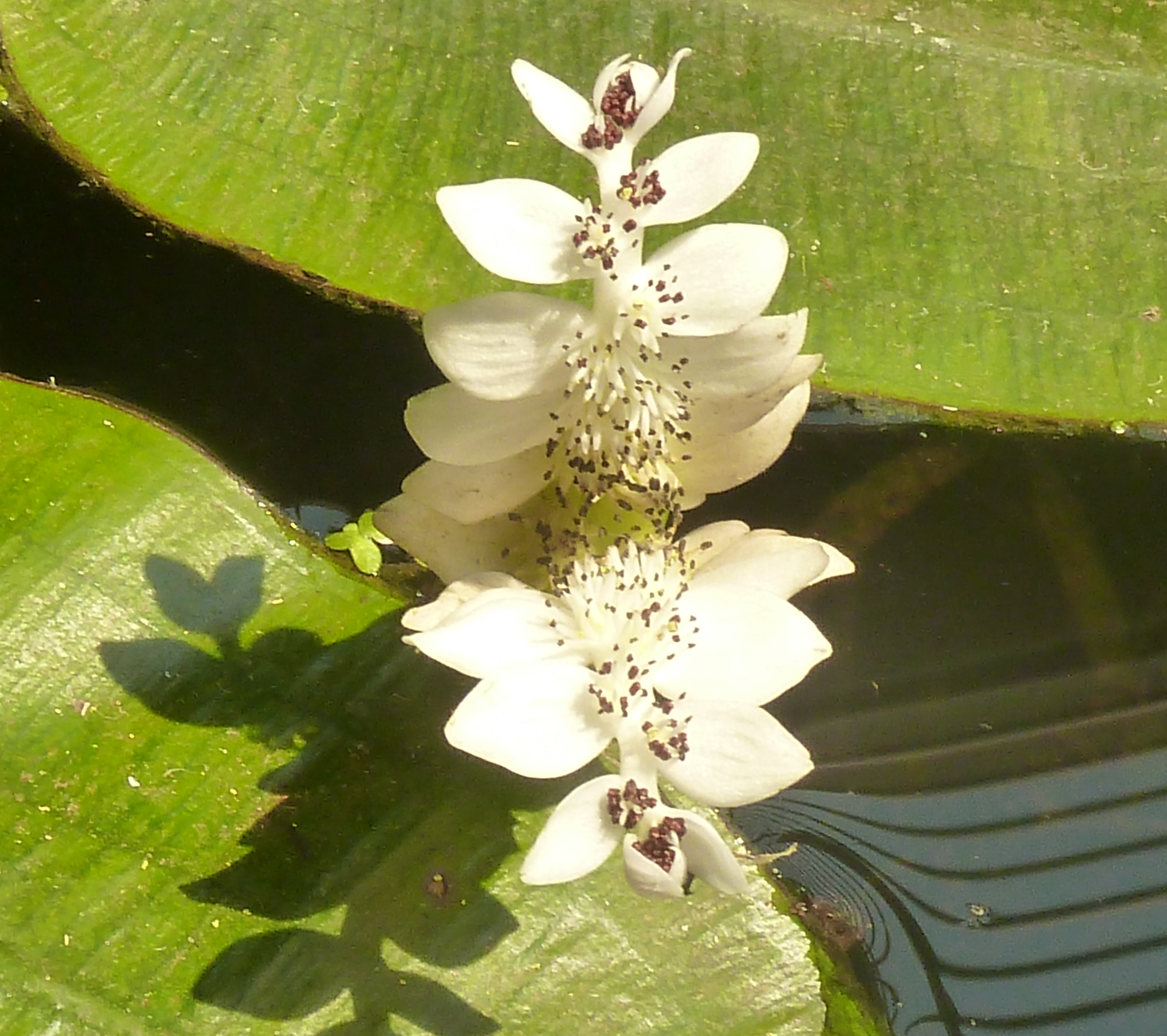
- A. distachyos, foliage and inflorescence at water surface

Scientific classification
- Kingdom: Plantae
- Clade: Tracheophytes
- Clade: Angiosperms
- Clade: Monocots
- Order: Alismatales
- Family: Aponogetonaceae; Planch.
- Genus: Aponogeton; L.f.

Type species
- Aponogeton monostachyos L.f.

Species
- See text
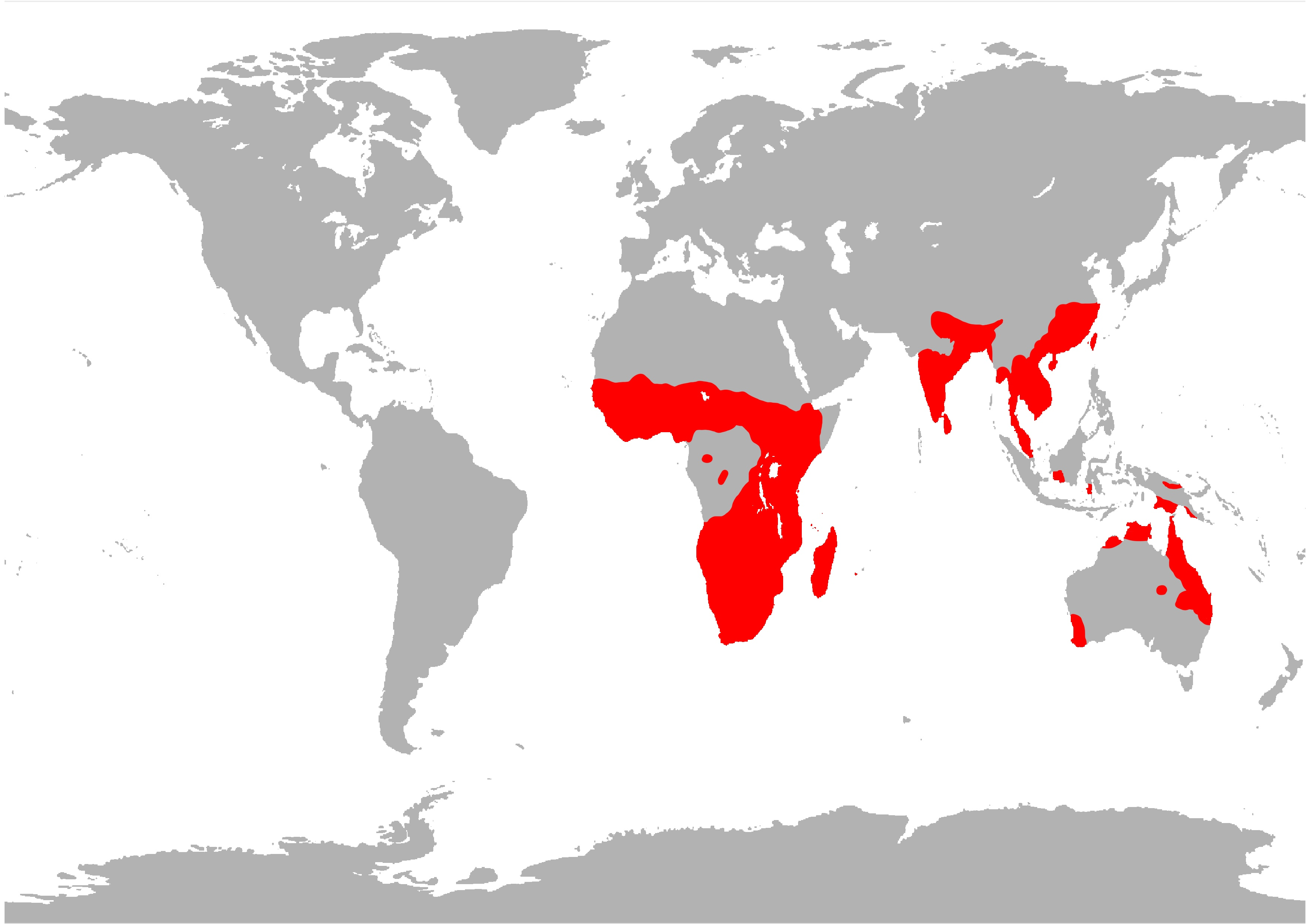

Synonyms
- 6 synonyms: Hydrogeton Pers.; Limnogeton Edgew.; Ouvirandra Thouars; Spathium Edgew.; Urirandra Thouars ex Mirb.; Uvirandra J.St.-Hil.

= Aponogeton =

Aponogeton Temporal range: Campanian–Recent

Genus of aquatic plants

The Aponogetonaceae (the Cape-pondweed family or aponogeton family) are a family of flowering plants in the order Alismatales.

In recent decades the family has had universal recognition by taxonomists. The APG system (1998) and APG II system (2003) treat it in the order Alismatales in the clade monocots. The family consists of only one genus, Aponogeton, with 56 known species (Christenhusz & Byng 2016) of aquatic plants, most of which have been included in a molecular phylogeny by Chen et al. (2015). The name was published in Supplementum Plantarum 32: 214 (1782) and is derived from a geographic location neighboring (geton) the Apono tribal district of coastal Gabon. Some species are used as ornamental plants in aquariums.

== Distribution ==
They are aquatic plants, which are found in tropical to warm temperate regions of Africa, Asia and Australasia.

Aponogeton distachyos is originally from South Africa but has become naturalised in South Australia, Western South America, and Western Europe.

Individual plants are not always easy to identify due to hybridization (particularly those sold as A. crispus - which are often cultivated hybrids with A. natans or A. rigidifolius).

Generally an Aponogeton from Asia will have a single bloom stalk, while those from African heritage (including Madagascar) will have multiple blooming stems on the same flower stalk.

Even though seventeen species are found in Africa, only one of them, A. distachyos, has been continuously maintained as a plant in garden ponds. Several of the eleven Madagascan species have been introduced as new aquarium plants in the early 21st century. At present, the following plants from Madagascar are in culture: Aponogeton boivinianus, A. longiplumulosus, A. madagascariensis and A. ulvaceus. Additionally, Aponogeton bernierianus, A. capuronii, A. decaryi and A. tenuispicatus have been imported on several occasions but have not achieved any wider distribution because they are difficult to maintain. From the sixteen representatives of this genus from Asia and Australia, A. crispus, A. elongatus, A. rigidifolius, A. robinsonii and A. undulatus are useful aquarium plants. Aponogeton jacobensii, A. natans and A. loriae, too, were cultivated several times but have not proven themselves under aquarium conditions.

== Evolution ==
The oldest known fossils of the genus are pollen from the Late Cretaceous (Campanian) of Wyoming in North America, approximately 82-84 million years old. Other fossil Aponogeton pollen is known from Canada and Greenland, dating to the Eocene, approximately 46 and 44-40 million years old respectively, indicating that the genus likely originated in the Northern Hemisphere.

== Ecology ==
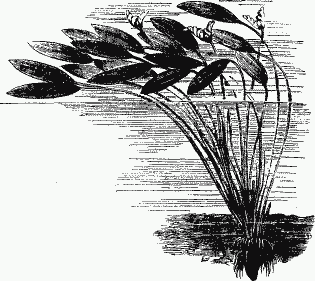
A. distachyos, habit, showing aerial and submerged parts

Many species grow in temporarily still or flowing waters and live through the dry period as a dormant tuber. They are fully aquatic herbaceous plants with milky sap, becoming dormant during drought conditions. Most species grow from tubers. Most Asian species remain submerged all year round, while the starchy tubercles of the African species are able to survive the dry season by shedding their leaves and undergoing a dormant period.

Almost all Aponogeton species go through resting and growth phases in their natural locations, triggered by the local ecological conditions. During growth periods, the plant will deposit proteins, fats, carbohydrates and mineral substances in the storage rhizome or tuber During the resting period, the tuber survives in the soil in order to again sprout during the following vegetation period. Tubers in Aponogeton species have a high resistance to drying out. This ability to store water is exploited, for instance, in the annual export of thousands of dormant A. crispus specimens, shipped in large bags in a totally dry state.

== Economic uses ==
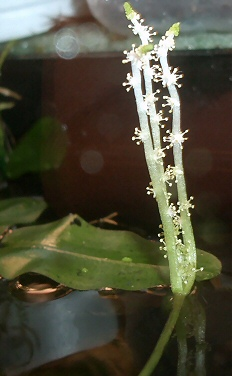
An African Aponogeton with a triple flower spike.

The tubers of several species are eaten by humans and their livestock. Some are grown as ornamental plants in aquariums or ponds. The 1889 book 'The Useful Native Plants of Australia' says of A. elongatus that "The tuberous roots of these water-plants are starchy, and of excellent taste, though not large".

== Cultivation ==
All Aponogeton species are easy to grow when their preferences are met. The Madagascar lace plants (A. madagascarensis) require special handling as they prefer cooler water – 70 °F (21 °C) as a maximum. As of 2010, the Australian species exist in very small numbers in the hobby trade.

== Rest periods ==
The African species in particular, (with the exception of A. rigidifolius, which has a rhizome and not a tuber), experience a natural rest period, corresponding to their habitat drying out in the wild. The Asian species may also have a rest period, but this is related only to temperature. As the plant stops growing, it can be taken out of the pond or aquarium and put in a bowl of damp sand. Keep the bowl in a dark, cool place, with the sand kept damp, for approximately 2–3 months at a temperature of about 50–64 °F (10–18 °C), until small leaves are seen to sprout from the tuber, when they can be returned to the pond or aquarium.

== Species ==
As of December 2025, Plants of the World Online accepts the following species:

- Aponogeton abyssinicus Hochst. ex A.Rich.
- Aponogeton afroviolaceus Lye
- Aponogeton angustifolius Aiton
- Aponogeton appendiculatus H.Bruggen
- Aponogeton azureus H.Bruggen
- Aponogeton bernierianus (Decne.) Hook.f.
- Aponogeton bogneri H.Bruggen
- Aponogeton boivinianus Baill. ex Jum.
- Aponogeton bruggenii S.R.Yadav & Govekar
- Aponogeton bullosus H.Bruggen
- Aponogeton capuronii H.Bruggen
- Aponogeton cordatus Jum.
- Aponogeton crispus Thunb.
- Aponogeton cuneatus S.W.L.Jacobs
- Aponogeton dassanayakei Manaw. & Yakand.
- Aponogeton decaryi Jum. ex Humbert
- Aponogeton desertorum Zeyh. ex Spreng.
- Aponogeton dioecus Bosser
- Aponogeton distachyos L.f.
- Aponogeton eggersii Bogner & H.Bruggen
- Aponogeton elongatus F.Muell. ex Benth.
- Aponogeton euryspermus Hellq. & S.W.L.Jacobs
- Aponogeton fotianus J.Raynal
- Aponogeton fugax J.C.Manning & Goldblatt
- Aponogeton gottlebei Kasselm. & Bogner
- Aponogeton hexatepalus H.Bruggen
- Aponogeton jacobsenii de Wit
- Aponogeton junceus Lehm.
- Aponogeton kannangarae M.A.Silva, Deshaprema & Manamperi
- Aponogeton kimberleyensis Hellq. & S.W.L.Jacobs
- Aponogeton lakhonensis A.Camus
- Aponogeton lancesmithii Hellq. & S.W.L.Jacobs
- Aponogeton longiplumulosus H.Bruggen
- Aponogeton loriae Martelli
- Aponogeton madagascariensis (Mirb.) H.Bruggen
- Aponogeton masoalaensis Bogner
- Aponogeton natalensis Oliv.
- Aponogeton natans (L.) Engl. & K.Krause
- Aponogeton nateshii S.R.Yadav
- Aponogeton nudiflorus Peter
- Aponogeton prolifer Hellq. & S.W.L.Jacobs
- Aponogeton queenslandicus H.Bruggen
- Aponogeton ranunculiflorus Jacot Guill. & Marais
- Aponogeton rehmannii Oliv.
- Aponogeton rigidifolius H.Bruggen
- Aponogeton robinsonii A.Camus
- Aponogeton satarensis Sundararagh., A.R.Kulk. & S.R.Yadav
- Aponogeton schatzianus Bogner & H.Bruggen
- Aponogeton stuhlmannii Engl.
- Aponogeton subconjugatus Schumach. & Thonn.
- Aponogeton tenuispicatus H.Bruggen
- Aponogeton tofus S.W.L.Jacobs
- Aponogeton troupinii J.Raynal
- Aponogeton ulvaceus Baker
- Aponogeton undulatus Roxb.
- Aponogeton vallisnerioides Baker
- Aponogeton vanbruggenii Hellq. & S.W.L.Jacobs
- Aponogeton viridis Jum.
- Aponogeton wolfgangianus S.R.Yadav
- Aponogeton womersleyi H.Bruggen
