= Harry van Bruggen =

Dutch botanist (1927–2010)

Heinrich Wilhelm Eduard (Harry) van Bruggen
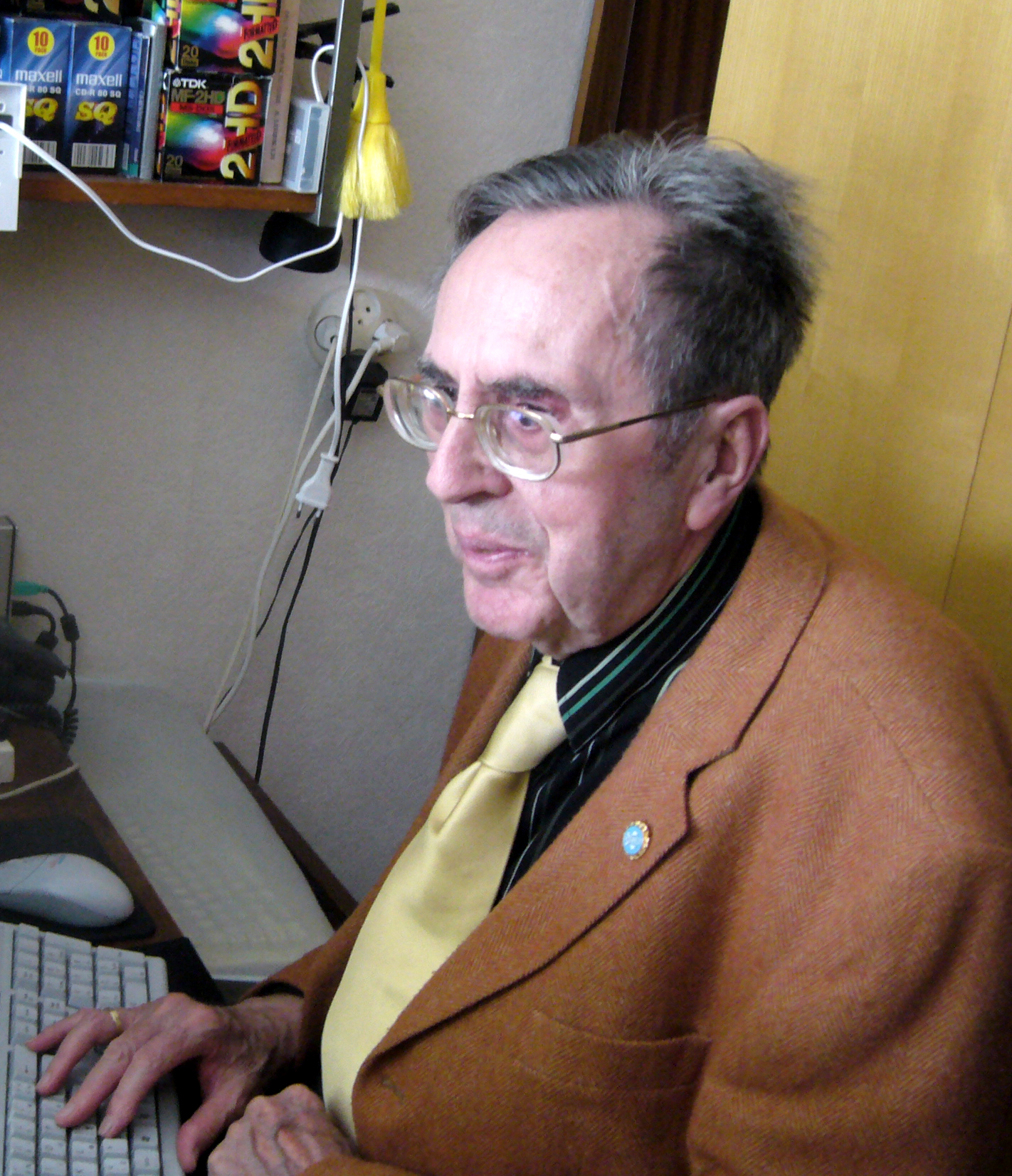
- Born: 6 December 1927; Amsterdam, The Netherlands
- Died: 8 February 2010 (aged 82); Amersfoort, The Netherlands
- Citizenship: Dutch
- Known for: studies on Aponogeton
- Scientific career
- Fields: Plant taxonomy
- Author abbrev. (botany): H.Bruggen

Heinrich (Harry) Wilhelm Eduard van Bruggen (December 6, 1927 in Amsterdam – February 8, 2010 in Amersfoort) was a Dutch amateur botanist.

== Personal life ==
After finishing secondary school, van Bruggen became an accountant, first in his uncle's company, later with Koninklijke Hoogovens, where he became the head of the Administration. In 1950, he married Anna Blom, with whom he had a son; she died in 1996. In April 2000 he remarried with Liesbeth Bakker. Van Bruggen was interested in nature already at a very young age, in particular in animals and plants in and around water. He sowed his first plants when he was 5-years old: Tagetes. This led to his lifelong interest in botany, particularly water and marsh plants and orchids. Van Bruggen was an active member of the "Dutch Waterplant Society", for which he did the administration during many years.

== Contributions to botany ==
In the late fifties, van Bruggen obtained from an aquarium-plant importer an Aponogeton species which he failed to be able to name using the existing literature. He concluded that it was a new species, unknown to science, and with the help of Hendrik de Wit he described the new species as Aponogeton rigidifolius H. Bruggen. In subsequent years he published a revision of the genus Aponogeton in several parts (organised geographically), culminating in his magnum opus, a complete monograph of this genus, which was well received in professional circles. In total, van Bruggen described 13 new Aponogeton species. For health reasons, van Bruggen never travelled to the tropics himself, but based his studies on observations from others and both living and dried (herbarium) materials sent to him.

Two Aponogeton species were named after van Bruggen: A. vanbruggenii C. B. Hellquist & S. W. L. Jacobs (Australia) and A. bruggenii S. R. Yadav & R. S. Govekar (India). In addition, one orchid subspecies, Ophrys holosericea (N.L. Burman) Greuter subsp. vanbruggeniana J. & L. Essink & Kreutz, was named after him, commemorating van Bruggen's lifelong interest in this family.
