= Edmond Gustave Camus =

French botanist (1852-1915)

Edmond Gustave Camus (1852 – 22 August 1915) was a French pharmacist and botanist known for his work with orchids.

A pharmacist by vocation, he was a resident of L'Isle-Adam, a community near Paris. He was the father of botanist Aimée Antoinette Camus (1879–1965), with whom he collaborated on several projects, and the painter Blanche-Augustine Camus (1881-1968). For a period of time, he served as vice-president of the Société botanique de France.

As a taxonomist, he was the binomial authority of many species, most notably within the family Orchidaceae. With Aimée Camus, he described numerous species from the family Salicaceae.

== Selected works ==
- Iconographie des orchidées des environs de Paris. Paris: 1885 – Iconography of orchids from the environs of Paris.
- Catalogue des plantes de France, de Suisse et de Belgique. 1888 – Catalog of plants from France, Switzerland and Belgium.
- Monographie des orchidées de France. Paris: 1894 – Monograph of orchids from France.
- Orchidées hybrides, ou, Critiques du Gers. 1898 – Orchid hybrids.
- Les plantes médicinales indigènes. 1901 – Indigenous medicinal plants.
- Classification des saules d'Europe et monographie des saules d'France (with Aimée Camus). Paris: J.Mersch, 1904-5 – Classification of willows found in Europe and a monograph of French willows.
- "A Contribution to the Study of Spontaneous Hybrids in the European Flora" (published in English, 1907).
- Monographie des orchidées de l'Europe: de l'Afrique septentrionale, de l'Asie Mineure et des provinces Russes transcaspiennes (with Paul Bergon, Aimée Camus). Paris: Jacques Lechevalier, 1908 – Monograph of orchids from Europe, northern Africa, Asia Minor and the Russian Trans-Caspian provinces.
- Iconographie des orchidées d'Europe et du bassin Méditerranéen, (with Aimée Camus). Paris: P. Lechevalier, 1921-1929 – Iconography of orchids from Europe and the Mediterranean Basin.

He also made notable contributions to the multi-volume Flore de France: Ou, Description Des Plantes Qui Croissent Spontanément en France, en Corse Et en Alsace-Lorraine.
