= Chihuahuan =

Chiahuahuan refers to something from Chihuahua, Mexico

It may also refer to:

- Chihuahuan Desert
- Chihuahuan raven
- Chihuahuan meadowlark
- Chihuahuan spotted whiptail
- Chihuahuan pocket mouse
- Chihuahuan skink
- Chihuahuan Desert Pocket Mouse
- Chihuahuan beehive
- Chihuahuan mountain kingsnake
- Chihuahuan night snake
- Chihuahuan arrowhead
- Chihuahuan Grasshopper Mouse
