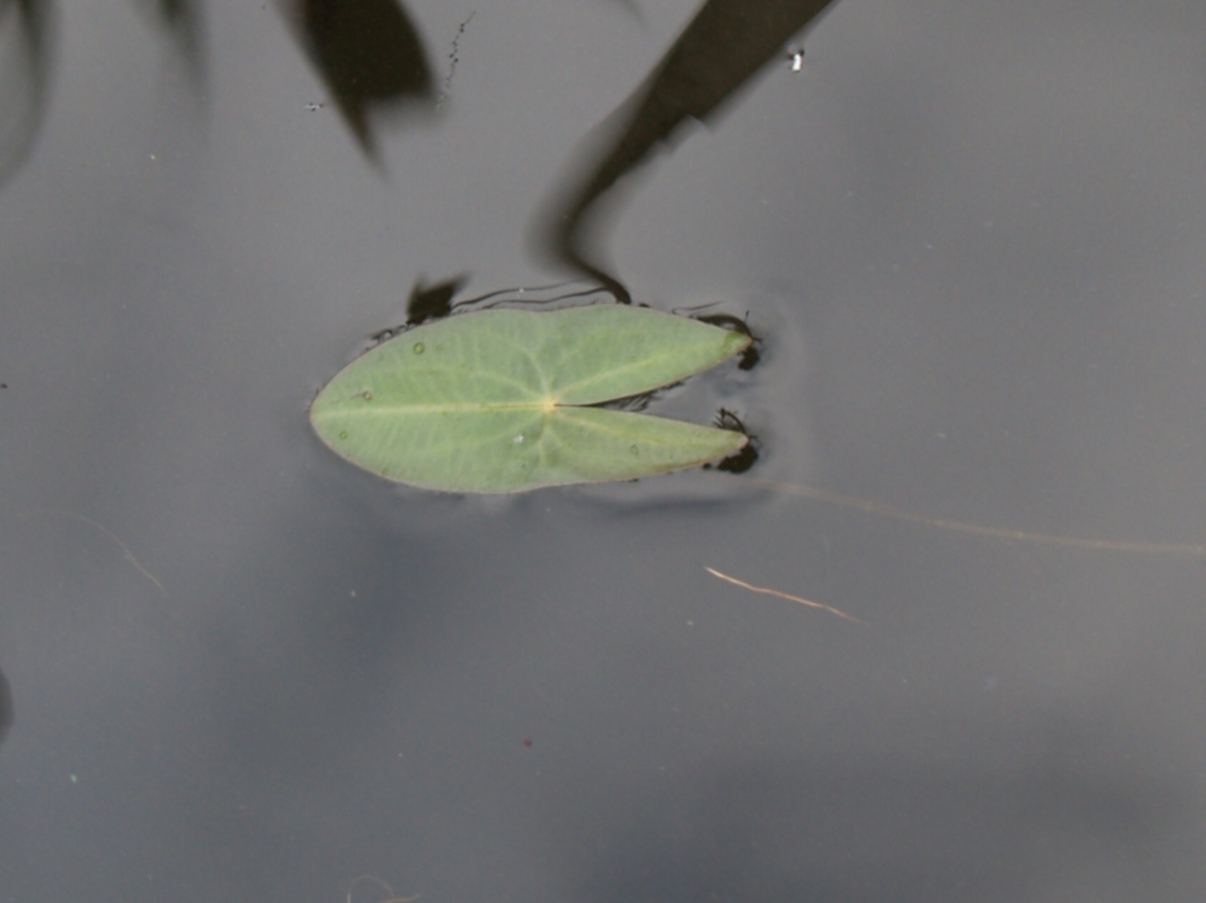

Scientific classification
- Kingdom: Plantae
- Clade: Tracheophytes
- Clade: Angiosperms
- Clade: Monocots
- Order: Alismatales
- Family: Alismataceae
- Genus: Sagittaria
- Species: S. natans

Binomial name
- Sagittaria natans Pall.

Synonyms
- Sagittaria alpina Willd.; Sagittaria alpina var. emersa Turcz.; Sagittaria alpina var. submersa Turcz.; Sagittaria sagittifolia f. auriculata Kom.; Sagittaria sagittifolia var. breviloba Regel; Sagittaria sagittifolia f. emersa Kom.; Sagittaria sagittifolia f. linearifolia Kom.; Sagittaria sagittifolia var. tenuior Wahlenb.

= Sagittaria natans =

Species of aquatic plant

Sagittaria natans is a species of flowering aquatic plant in the water plantain family. It has floating leaves that are linear, heart-shaped or arrow-shaped.

It is native to northern Europe and Asia and often cultivated elsewhere as an aquatic ornamental in aquaria and artificial ponds. It is widespread across much of the Russian Federation and reported also from Finland, Sweden, Mongolia, Japan, Korea, Kazakhstan and China (Heilongjiang, Jilin, Liaoning, Nei Mongol, Xinjiang). It grows in slow-moving and stagnant water bodies such as ponds and small streams.
