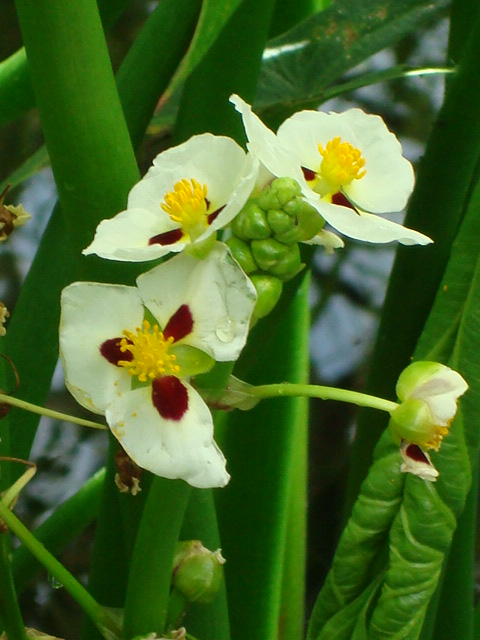

Conservation status
- Secure (NatureServe)

Scientific classification
- Kingdom: Plantae
- Clade: Tracheophytes
- Clade: Angiosperms
- Clade: Monocots
- Order: Alismatales
- Family: Alismataceae
- Genus: Sagittaria
- Species: S. montevidensis

Binomial name
- Sagittaria montevidensis Cham. & Schltdl.

Subspecies
- See text

Synonyms
- Lophotocarpus spongiosus (Engelm.) J.G.Sm.; Sagittaria alismifolia Phil. ex Micheli; Sagittaria andina Phil.; Sagittaria calycina Engelm.; Sagittaria calycina var. spongiosa Engelm.; Sagittaria chilensis Cham. & Schltdl.; Sagittaria incrassata Steud. [Invalid]; Sagittaria montevidensis subsp. chilensis (Cham. & Schltdl.) Bogin; Sagittaria montevidensis f. flaviflora Chodat & Hassl.; Sagittaria montevidensis f. immaculata Hicken</small; Sagittaria montevidensis f. maculata Hicken; Sagittaria montevidensis f. normalis Hauman; Sagittaria montevidensis var. scabra Micheli; Sagittaria montevidensis var. spongiosa (Engelm.) B.Boivin; Sagittaria multinervia Larrañaga; Sagittaria oblonga Larrañaga; Sagittaria ovifolia Larrañaga; Sagittaria pugioniformis var. andina (Phil.) Kuntze; Sagittaria pugioniformis var. chilensis (Cham. & Schltdl.) Kuntze; Sagittaria pugioniformis f. depauperata Kuntze; Sagittaria pugioniformis f. longipedicellata Kuntze; Sagittaria pugioniformis f. macrophylla Chodat & Hassl.; Sagittaria pugioniformis var. montevidensis (Cham. & Schltdl.) Kuntze; Sagittaria teniifolia Phil. ex Micheli

= Sagittaria montevidensis =

California arrowhead

Species of plant

Sagittaria montevidensis is a species of flowering plant in the water-plantain family Alismataceae. Common names include giant arrowhead and California arrowhead.

== Description ==
Sagittaria montevidensis is a robust, stemless, rhizomatous, aquatic plant. The young ribbon-like leaves grow submerged, while the leaves of older plants emerge above the water surface. The leaves are sagitatte and glabrous, up to 28 centimetres (11 inches) long and 23 cm (9 in) wide. Its terete, spongy petioles may reach a length of more than 0.75 metres (2 1/2 feet) and are up to 7.5 cm (3 in) thick.

Inflorescences are typically shorter than the leaves and decumbent. Flowers are in whorls or pairs at nodes and have a diameter of two to three centimeters. They have three petals, each of which is white with a striking wine-colored stain, and three green sepals. The thick pedicels are as long as 5 cm (2 in). Flowering occurs from June to September.

== Subspecies ==
- Sagittaria montevidensis subsp. calycina (Engelm.) Bogin (syn. Sagittaria calycina Engelm.) – United States, Mexico
- Sagittaria montevidensis subsp. montevidensis – South America
- Sagittaria montevidensis subsp. spongiosa (syn. Sagittaria calycina var. spongiosa Engelm., Lophotocarpus spongiosus (Engelm.) J.G.Sm.) – Mid-Atlantic and Northeastern United States, New Brunswick in Canada
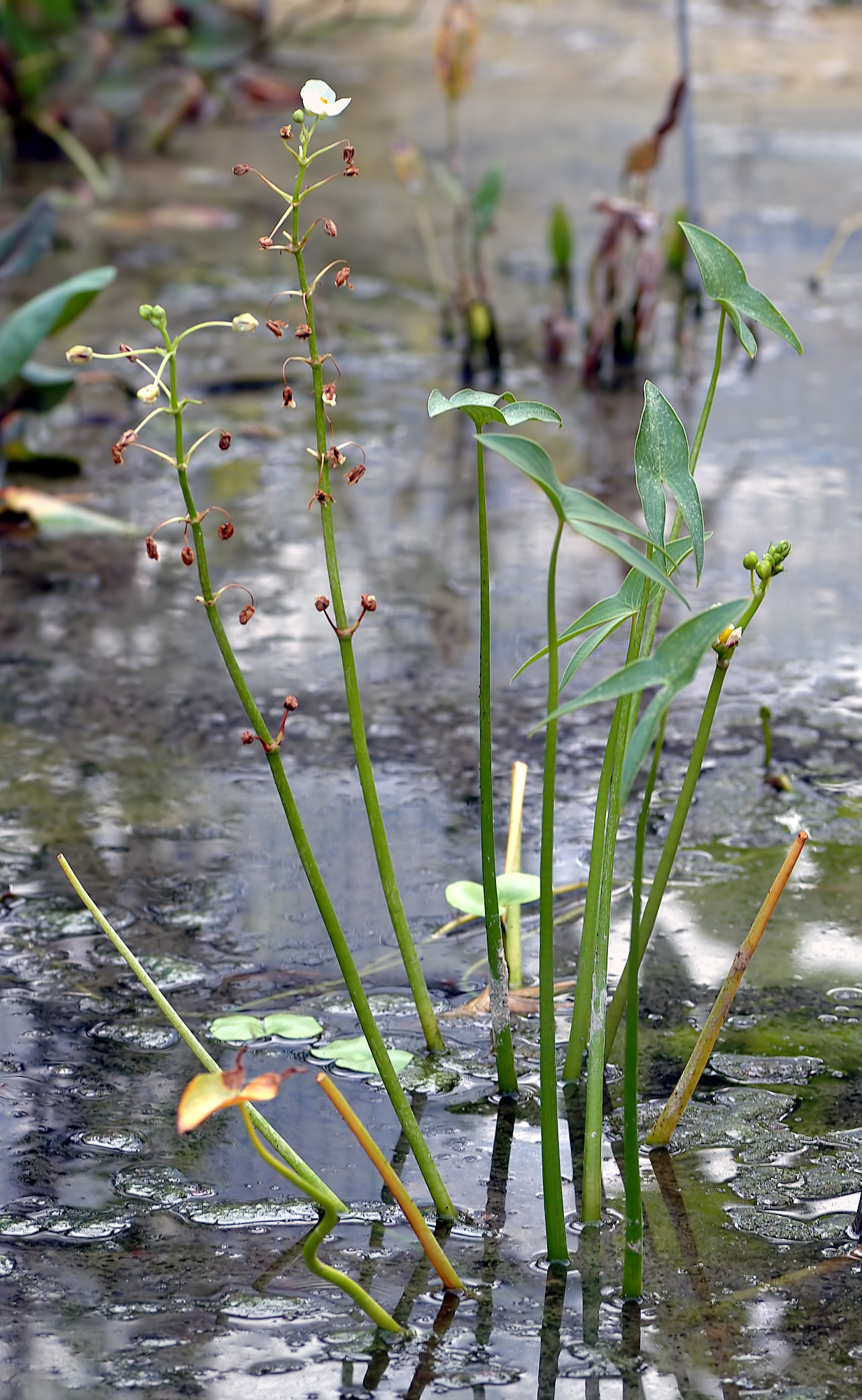
Giant arrowhead (Sagittaria montevidensis)

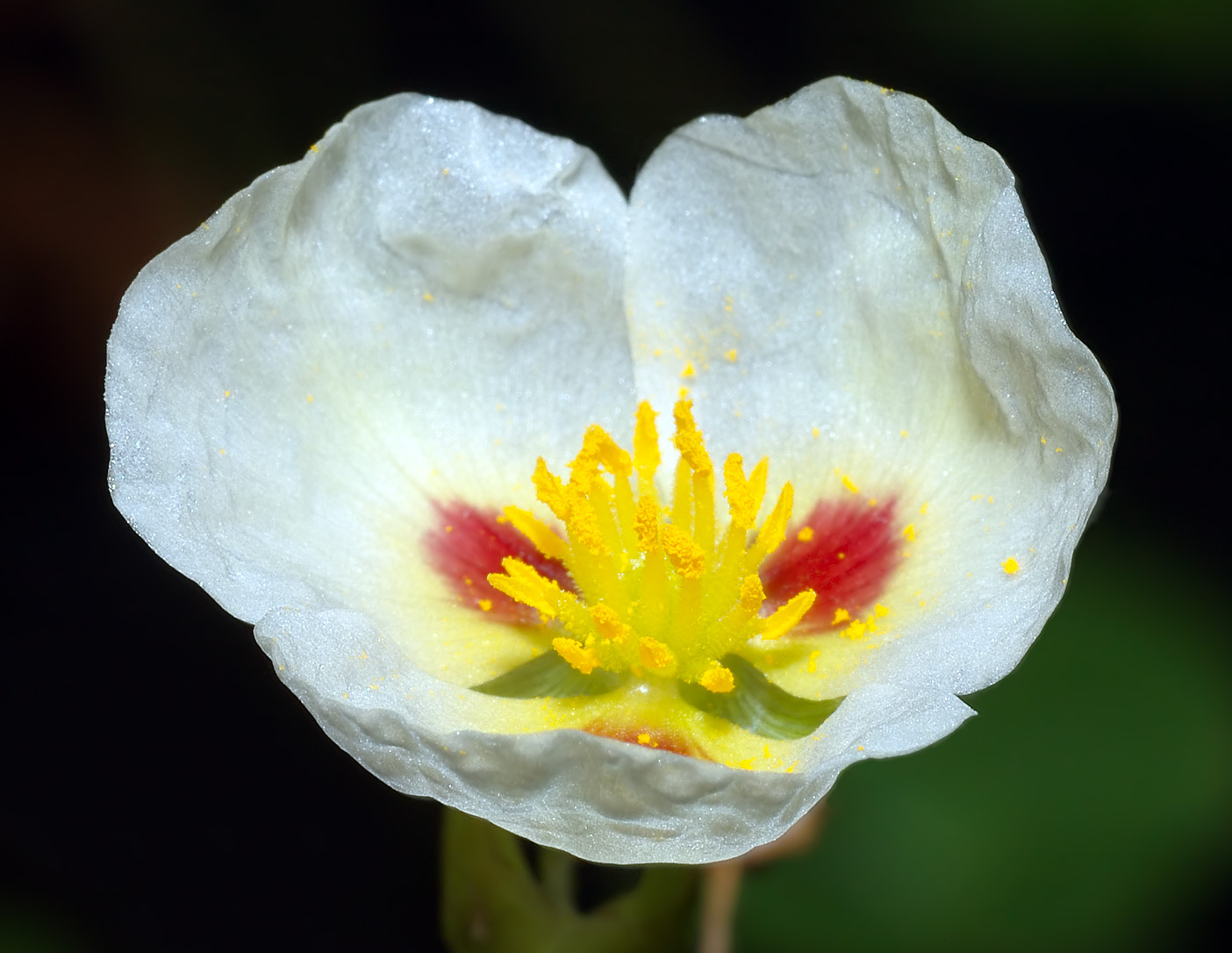
Close-up on a flower

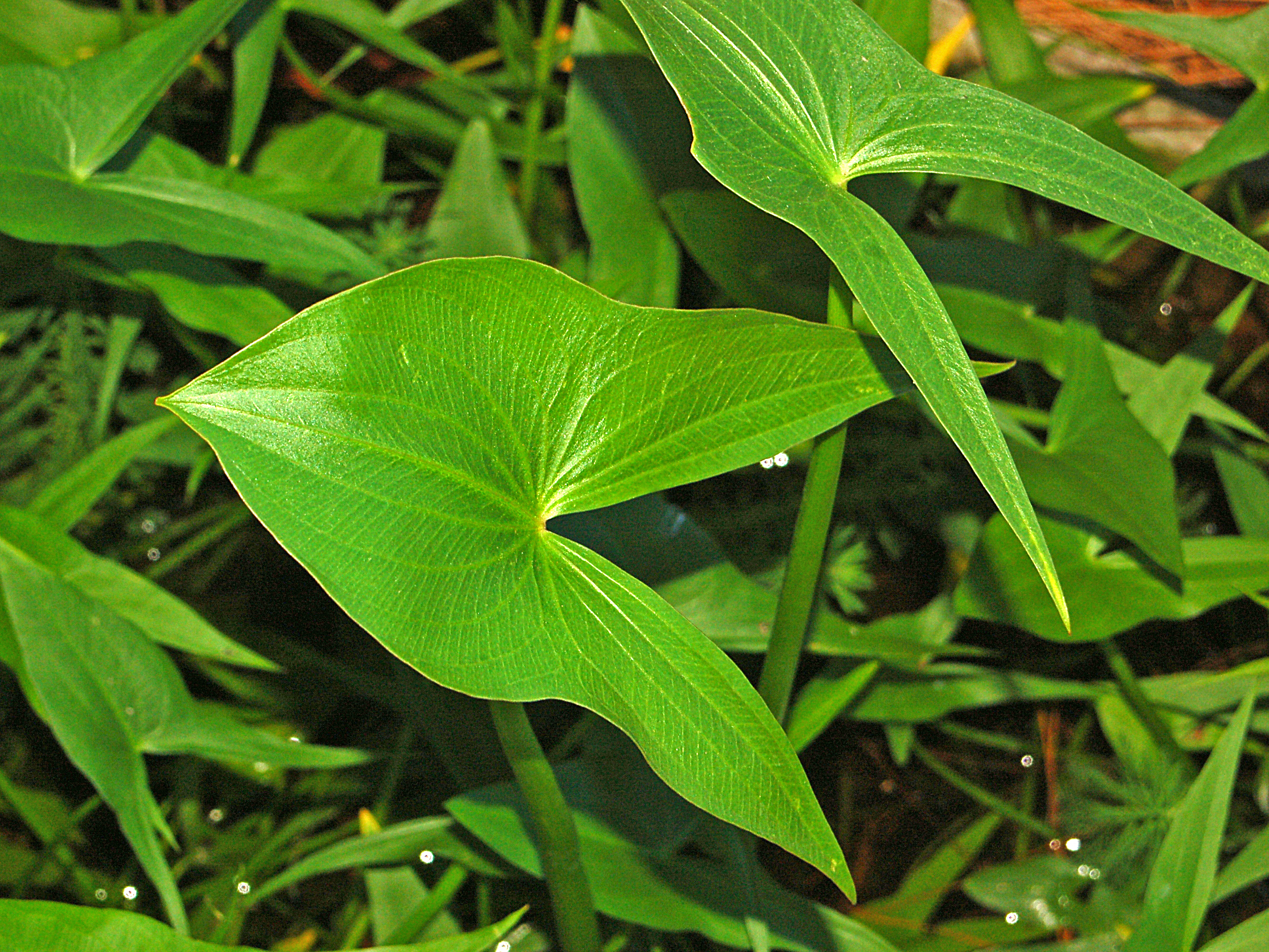
Leaves of Sagittaria montevidensis at the Orto Botanico dell'Università di Genova

== Distribution and habitat ==
S. montevidensis is widespread in wetlands of North America (United States, Canada, Mexico) and South America (Brazil, Bolivia, Ecuador, Peru, Argentina, Chile, Paraguay, Uruguay). In North America, the distribution is disjunct, primarily in a wide area from West Virginia to Texas to South Dakota, but with isolated occurrences in New Brunswick, Maine, Connecticut, New York, New Jersey, California, Florida and Alabama It is reportedly naturalized in Spain, Tanzania, and the Island of Java in Indonesia.

It grows preferentially at the edges of ponds, in shallow and often only temporarily existing waters.
