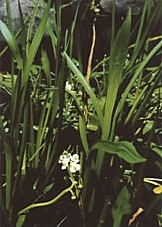

Conservation status
- Vulnerable (NatureServe)

Scientific classification
- Kingdom: Plantae
- Clade: Tracheophytes
- Clade: Angiosperms
- Clade: Monocots
- Order: Alismatales
- Family: Alismataceae
- Genus: Sagittaria
- Species: S. sanfordii

Binomial name
- Sagittaria sanfordii Greene

= Sagittaria sanfordii =

Species of aquatic plant

Sagittaria sanfordii is an uncommon species of flowering plant in the water plantain family known by the common names valley arrowhead and Sanford's arrowhead that is endemic to California.

== Description ==
Sagittaria sanfordii is an aquatic perennial herb up to 130 centimetres (51 inches) tall, growing from a spherical tuber. The leaves are very often submerged, variable in shape, usually long and strap-shaped or narrowly lanceolate. Leaves may grow up to 25 cm (10 in) long from the underwater stem. The plant is monoecious, with individuals bearing both male and female flowers. The inflorescence which rises above the surface of the water is a raceme made up of several whorls of flowers, the lowest node bearing female flowers and upper nodes bearing male flowers. The flower is up to 3.5 cm (1 1/2 in) wide with white petals. The male flowers have rings of stamens at the centers. Female flowers each have a spherical cluster of pistils which develops into a head of tiny fruits.

== Distribution and habitat ==
In California, it is known from a few scattered occurrences on the North Coast and in the Central Valley. Many occurrences previously noted in the Central Valley and in southern California have been extirpated as the plant's aquatic habitat has been lost to human activity.
