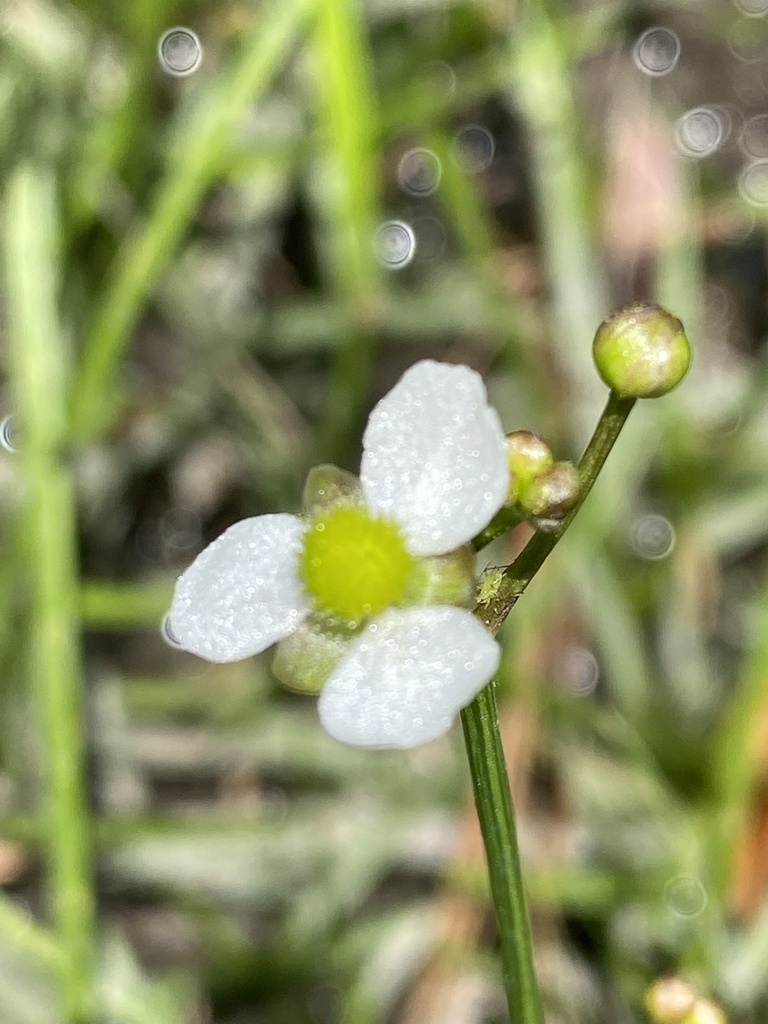

Conservation status
- Imperiled (NatureServe)

Scientific classification
- Kingdom: Plantae
- Clade: Tracheophytes
- Clade: Angiosperms
- Clade: Monocots
- Order: Alismatales
- Family: Alismataceae
- Genus: Sagittaria
- Species: S. macrocarpa

Binomial name
- Sagittaria macrocarpa J.G.Sm.

Synonyms
- Sagittaria graminea var. macrocarpa (J.G.Sm.) Bogin

= Sagittaria macrocarpa =

Large-fruited arrowhead

Species of aquatic plant

Sagittaria macrocarpa, commonly called the large-fruited arrowhead, is an aquatic plant species known only from the US states of North Carolina and South Carolina.
