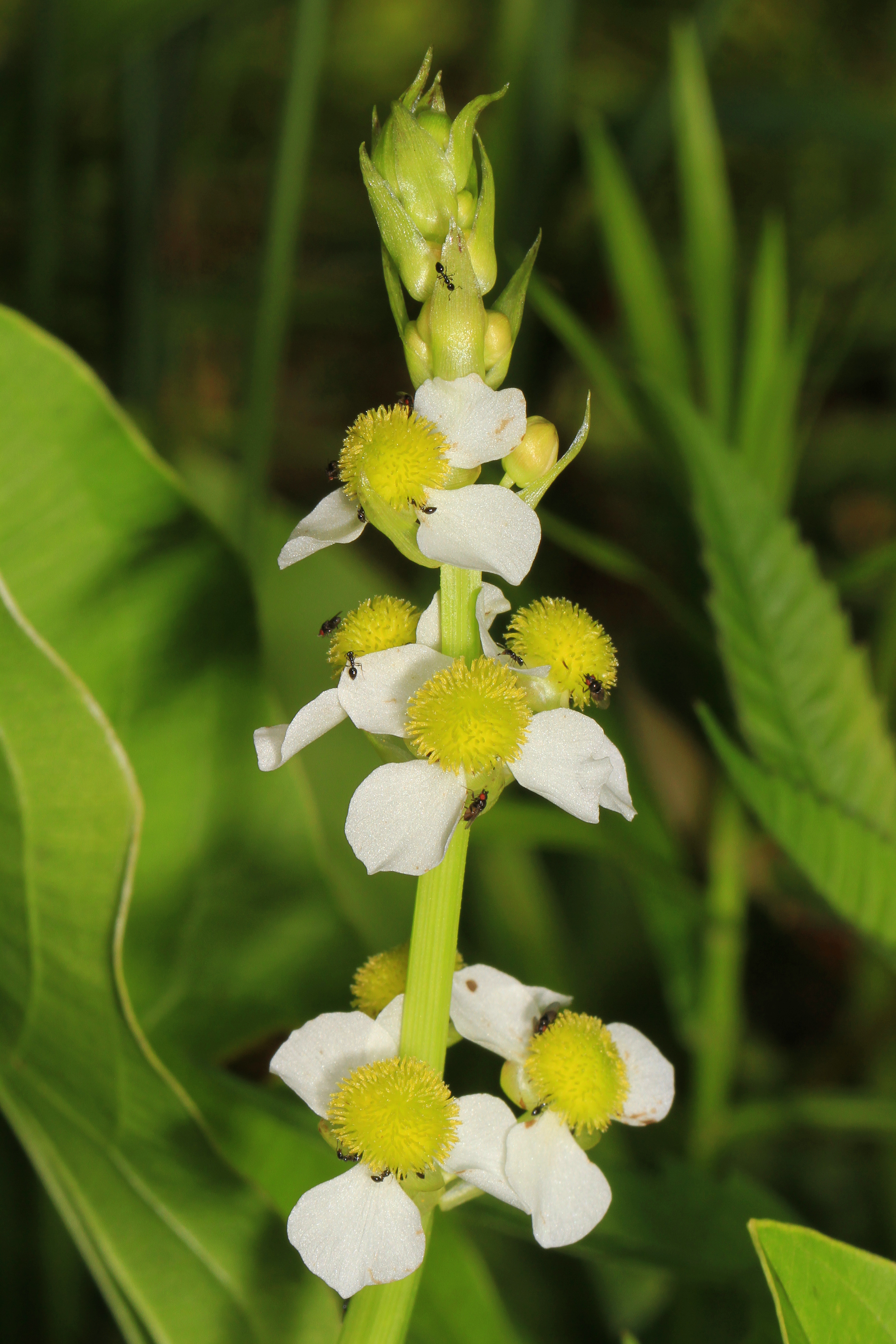
- Long-beaked arrowhead - Sagittaria australis

Scientific classification
- Kingdom: Plantae
- Clade: Tracheophytes
- Clade: Angiosperms
- Clade: Monocots
- Order: Alismatales
- Family: Alismataceae
- Genus: Sagittaria
- Species: S. australis

Binomial name
- Sagittaria australis (J.G.Sm.) Small

Synonyms
- Sagittaria engelmanniana subsp. longirostra (Micheli) Bogin; Sagittaria longirostra var. australis J.G. Sm.

= Sagittaria australis =

Species of aquatic plant

Sagittaria australis, the Appalachian arrowhead or longbeak arrowhead, is a plant found in North America. It is a perennial herb up to 130 centimetres (51 inches) tall. It is an unusual Sagittaria species in that it has a five-winged petiole. The flowers are up to 3 cm (1 in) in diameter, white, producing an achene with a recurved beak.

The species is native to much of the eastern United States, from Louisiana to Iowa to New York State to Florida, mostly between New Jersey and Mississippi with scattered locations elsewhere in the range. It is an emergent aquatic plant, growing in swamps and along the edges of lakes and ponds. It is sometimes sold as an ornamental to be cultivated in aquaria or garden ponds.
