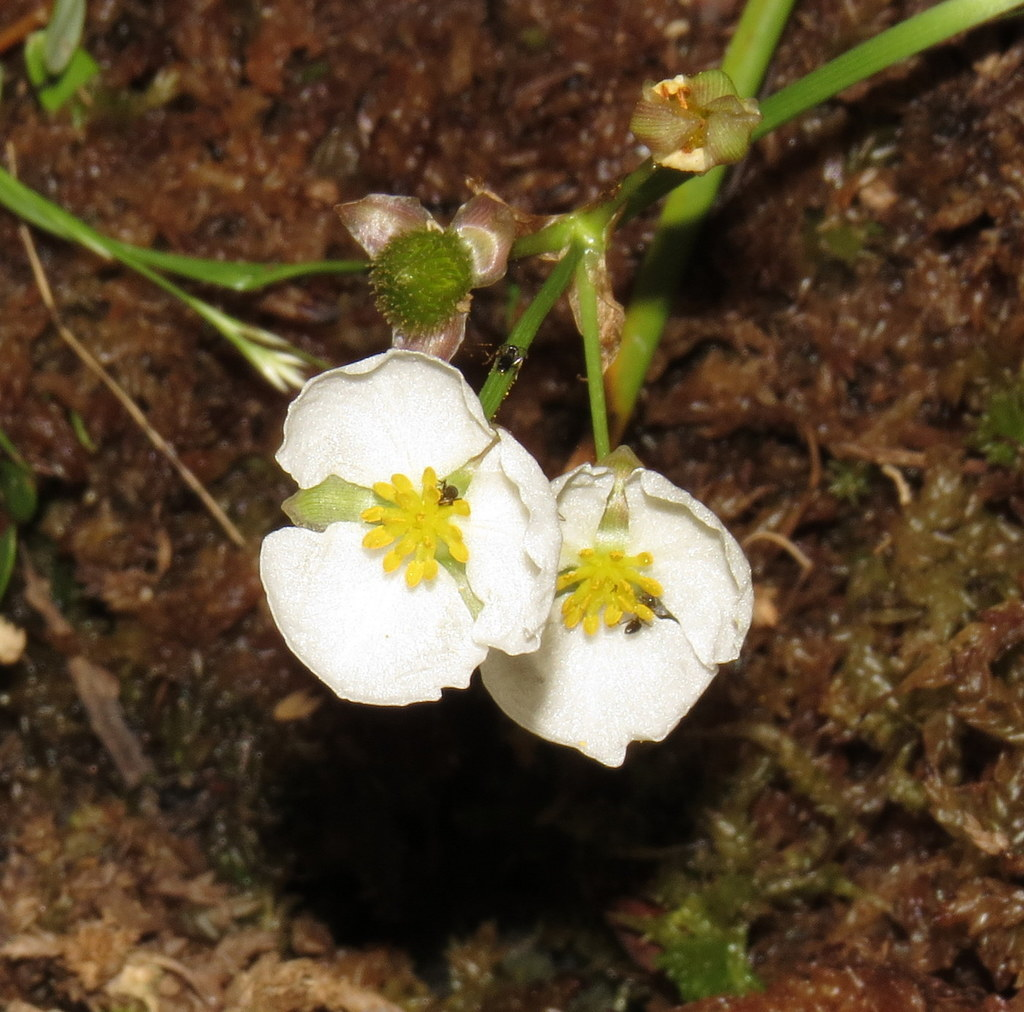

Scientific classification
- Kingdom: Plantae
- Clade: Tracheophytes
- Clade: Angiosperms
- Clade: Monocots
- Order: Alismatales
- Family: Alismataceae
- Genus: Sagittaria
- Species: S. engelmanniana

Binomial name
- Sagittaria engelmanniana J.G.Sm
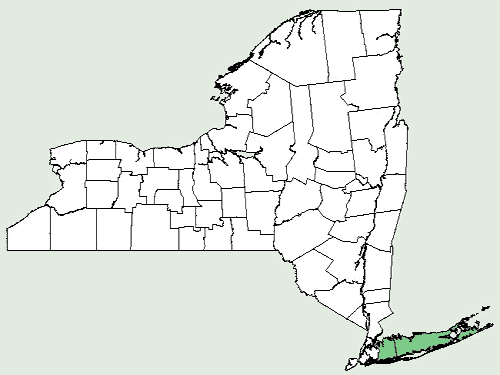
- Sagittaria engelmanniana range map of New York

Synonyms
- Sagitta engelmanniana (J.G.Sm.) Nieuwl.; Sagittaria engelmanniana f. dilatata Fernald; Sagittaria variabilis var. gracilis S.Wats in A. Gray 1889, not Englm. 1856 (fide Small 1894)

= Sagittaria engelmanniana =

Acid-water arrowhead

Species of aquatic plant

Sagittaria engelmanniana (Engelmann's arrowhead or acid-water arrowhead) is a perennial aquatic plant growing up to 70 centimetres (28 inches) tall. The leaves are sagittate (arrow-shaped) with 3 very narrow lobes.

The species is native to eastern North America. It has been reported from every state bordering on the Gulf of Mexico or on the Atlantic Ocean from Mississippi to Massachusetts, plus Vermont and Ontario. It occurs in wetlands, predominantly those with acidic water such as Sphagnum bogs.
