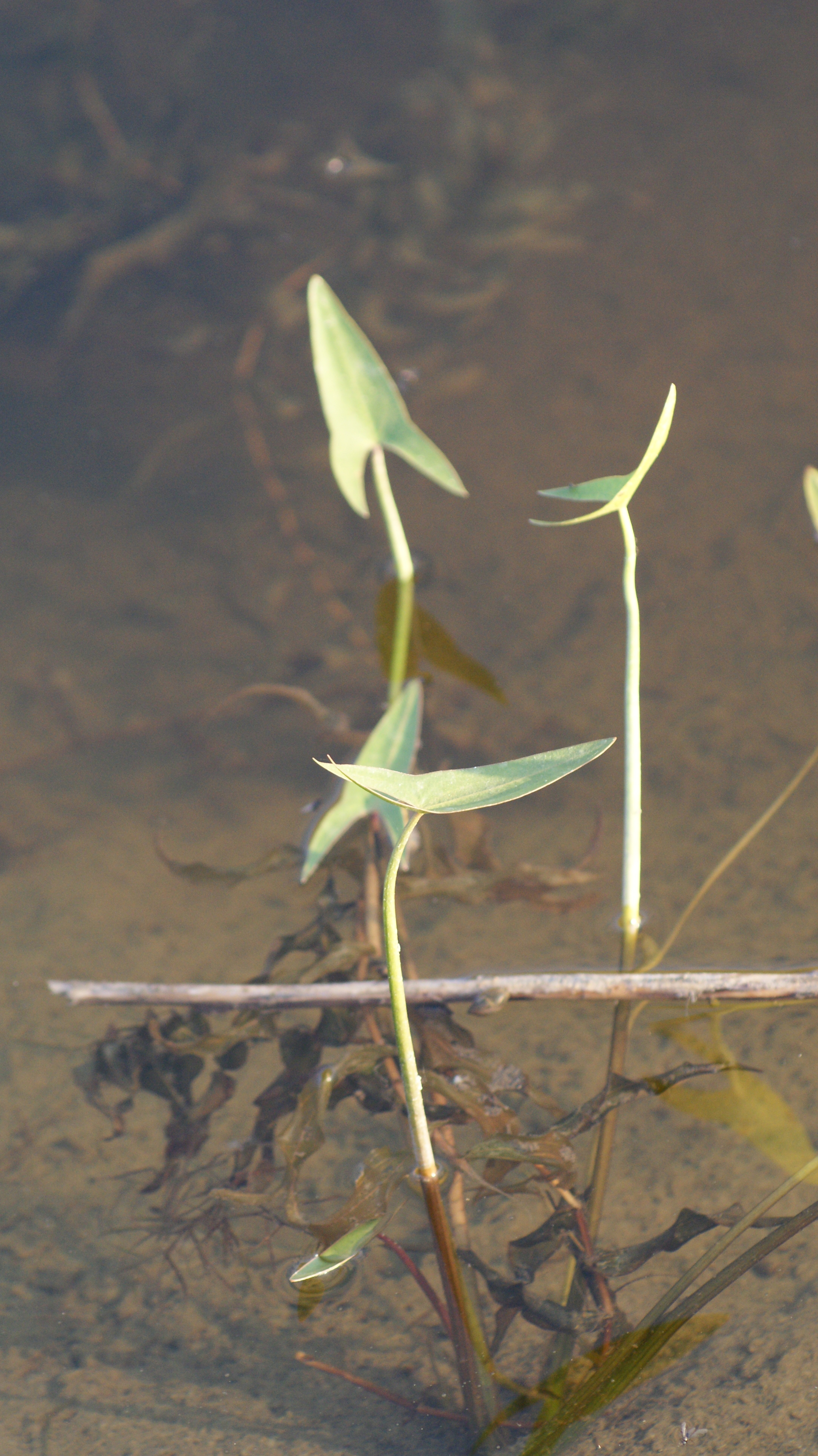

Conservation status
- Secure (NatureServe)

Scientific classification
- Kingdom: Plantae
- Clade: Tracheophytes
- Clade: Angiosperms
- Clade: Monocots
- Order: Alismatales
- Family: Alismataceae
- Genus: Sagittaria
- Species: S. cuneata

Binomial name
- Sagittaria cuneata E.Sheld.

Synonyms
- Sagittaria arifolia Nutt. ex J.G.Sm.; Sagittaria hebetiloba A.Nelson; Sagittaria paniculata Blank.; Sagittaria marioniae R.Loxley; Sagittaria sagittifolia var. minor Pursh; Sagittaria suksdorfii Gand.

= Sagittaria cuneata =

Species of aquatic plant

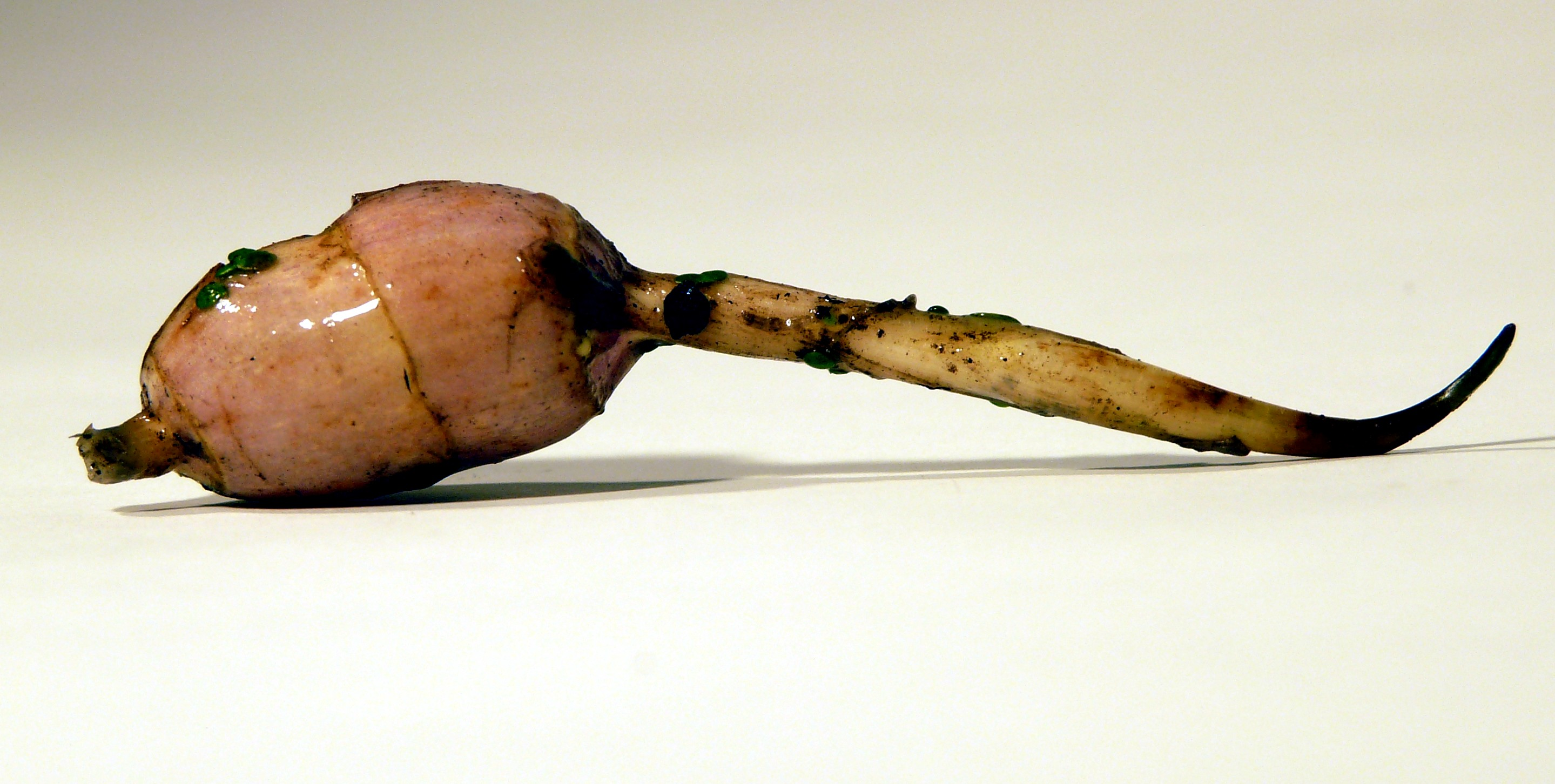
Edible root of the plant

Sagittaria cuneata is a North American species of flowering plant in the water plantain family known by the common name arumleaf arrowhead or duck potato. Like some other Sagittaria species, it may be called wapato.

== Description ==
Sagittaria cuneata is an aquatic plant, growing in slow-moving and stagnant water bodies such as ponds and small streams. It is quite variable in appearance, and submerged parts of the plant look different from those growing above the surface or on land. It is a perennial herb growing from a white or blue-tinged tuber. The leaves are variable in shape, many of them sagittate (arrow-shaped) with two smaller, pointed lobes opposite the tip. The leaf blades are borne on very long petioles. The plant is monoecious (individuals bearing both male and female flowers). The inflorescence, which rises above the surface of the water, is a raceme made up of several whorls of flowers, the lowest node bearing female flowers and upper ones bearing males. The flower is up to 2.5 centimetres (1 inch) wide with white petals. The male flowers have rings of yellow stamens at the centers. Each female flower has a spherical cluster of pistils which develops into a group of tiny fruits.

== Distribution and habitat ==
It is native to much of North America, including most of Canada (every province and territory except Nunavut) as well as the western and northeastern United States (New England, Great Lakes, Great Plains, Rocky Mountain, Great Basin and Pacific Coast states; including Alaska but not Hawaii).

== Ecology ==
Muskrat and beavers store them in large caches.

== Conservation ==
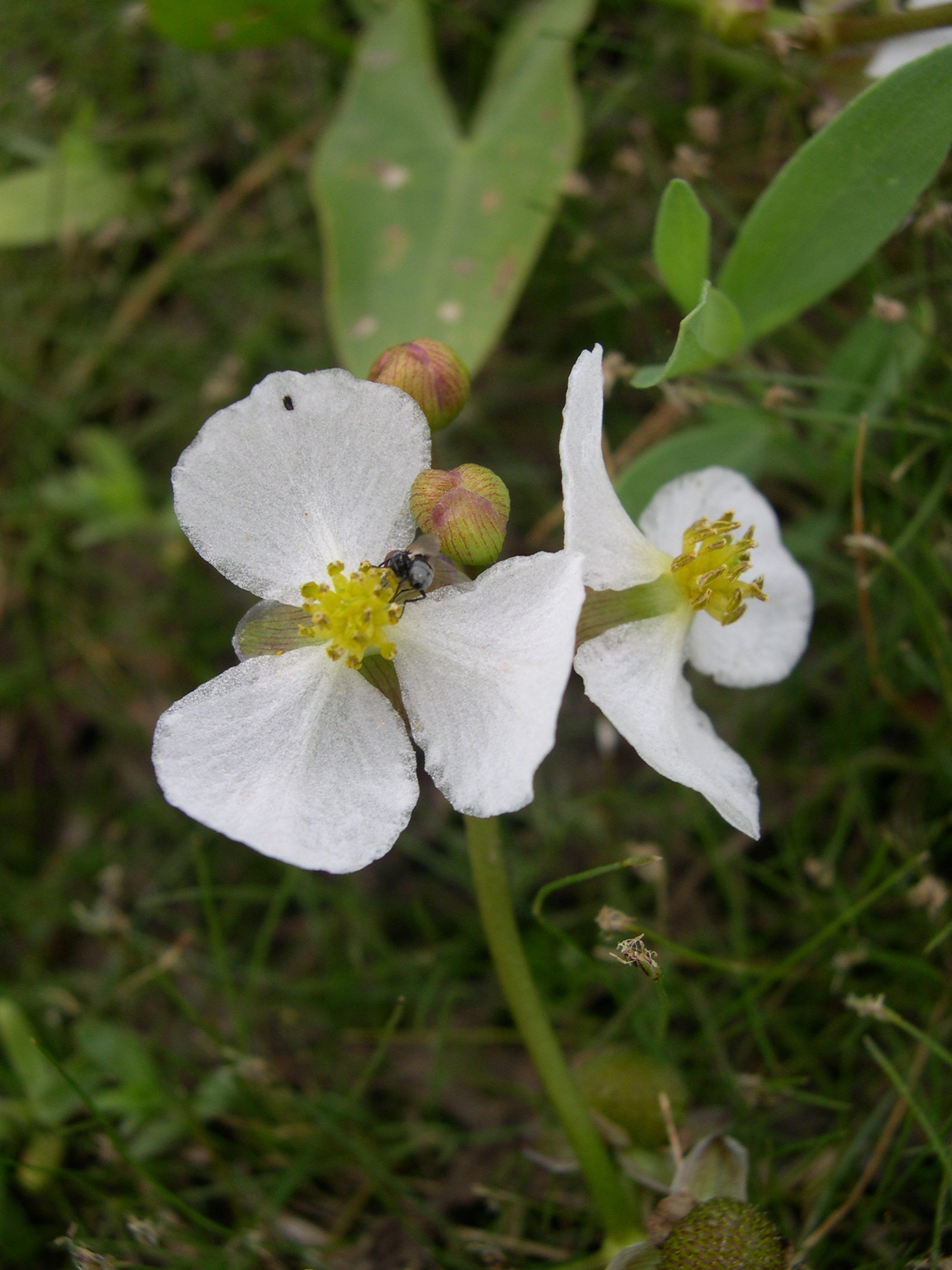

It is listed as endangered in Connecticut and New Jersey. It is listed as threatened in Massachusetts, New Hampshire, and Ohio.

== Uses ==
The Cheyenne give dried leaves to horses for urinary troubles and for a sore mouth. The Klamath use the rootstocks as food. The Menominee string the dried, boiled, sliced potatoes together for winter use. The Ojibwe eat the corms for indigestion, and also as a food, eaten boiled fresh, dried or candied with maple sugar. They would sometimes look for caches of this plant made by muskrats or beavers and appropriate them for their own use. The Northern Paiute use the roots for food. The indigenous people of Montana eat the tubers raw and boiled.
