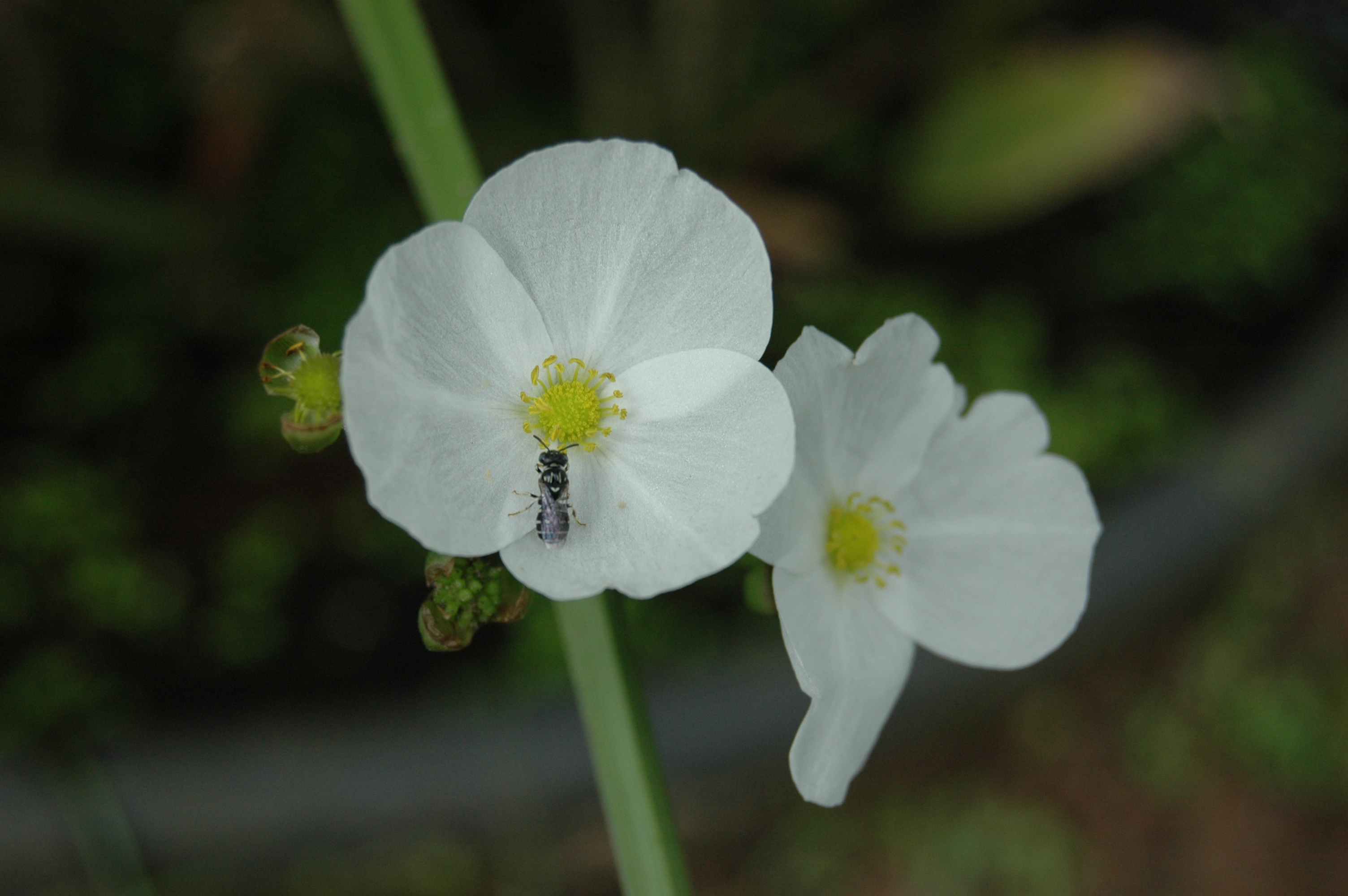
- In Bangladesh

Conservation status
- Least Concern (IUCN 3.1)

Scientific classification
- Kingdom: Plantae
- Clade: Tracheophytes
- Clade: Angiosperms
- Clade: Monocots
- Order: Alismatales
- Family: Alismataceae
- Genus: Sagittaria
- Species: S. guayanensis

Binomial name
- Sagittaria guayanensis Kunth

Subspecies
- Sagittaria guayanensis subsp. guayanensis; Sagittaria guayanensis subsp. lappula (D.Don) Bogin

Synonyms
- Echinodorus guayanensis (Kunth) Griseb.; Lophiocarpus guayanensis (Kunth) Micheli; Lophotocarpus guayanensis (Kunth) T.Durand & Schinz; Lophotocarpus guayanensis (Kunth) J.G.Sm.

= Sagittaria guayanensis =

Species of plant

Sagittaria guayanensis, the Guyanese arrowhead, is a perennial aquatic plant species native to both the Old and New World. It has broadly hastate (arrow-shaped) leaves with ovate lobes.

The epithet has incorrectly been spelled "guyanensis" by some authors. The type locale is not Guyana but rather in the Guayana region in what is now eastern Venezuela, regarded as part of Colombia when the specimen was collected.

It is predominantly tropical, native to Mexico, Central America, the West Indies, and much of South America, as well as West Africa (from Senegal to Cameroon), south and southeast Asia (from Afghanistan to Taiwan to Indonesia), plus Sudan and Madagascar. It was unknown in the United States until a few populations were reported from Louisiana in 1969.

Guyanese arrowhead were also found in the forests of Pilibhit in India.
