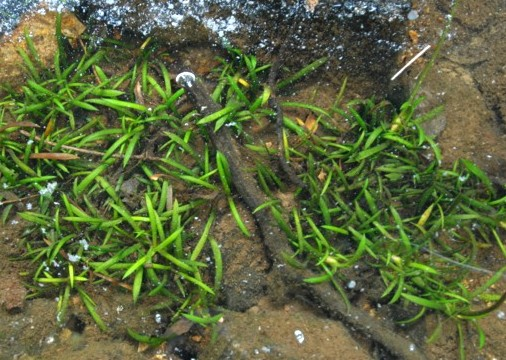

Conservation status
- Critically Imperiled (NatureServe)

Scientific classification
- Kingdom: Plantae
- Clade: Tracheophytes
- Clade: Angiosperms
- Clade: Monocots
- Order: Alismatales
- Family: Alismataceae
- Genus: Sagittaria
- Species: S. secundifolia

Binomial name
- Sagittaria secundifolia Kral

= Sagittaria secundifolia =

Little River arrowhead

Species of aquatic plant

Sagittaria secundifolia, also known as Kral's water plantain or Little River arrowhead is an endangered aquatic plant endemic to banks along the Little River of the U.S. states of Alabama and Georgia.

== Description ==
It is a perennial, aquatic plant with an underwater, thick horizontal root about 5–10 centimetres (2–4 inches) long and 6 millimetres (1/4 in) thick. This particular species grows in the cracks in stream beds. Each leaf arches upward and is 5–10 cm long with a pointed tip.

== Distribution and habitat ==
S. secundifolia is found growing on or below the water, on rocky creek beds and nearby slopes.in the Little River drainage in DeKalb and Cherokee counties of Alabama and Chattooga County, Georgia, the Town Creek drainage in DeKalb County (where it is believed to have been extirpated), and in the West Sipsey Fork in Winston County in Alabama. It is often found in association with azaleas (Rhododendron sp.), mountain laurel (Kalmia sp.) and holly (Ilex sp.).

== Conservation ==
Both threatened and endangered species and poached species are critical resources to several parks. The last known population of Sagittaria secundifolia is in the Little River system (USFWS 1991), and the endangered green pitcher plant (Sarracenia oreophila) and harperella (Harperella nodosa) are also found there (LIRI). The Lookout Mountain (CHCH) population of the federally endangered mountain skullcap (Scutellaria montana) is listed as one of the last ten remaining populations. The Tennessee coneflower (Echinacea tennesseensis) population at STRI is one of five remaining (USFWS 1989).

Reasons to explain the endangered status of S. secundifolia include erosion-related water quality degradation, silting and turbidity, resulting from residential or recreational development, as well as surface mining, agriculture, and forest conversion. Another issue is water pollution from garbage dumping and leaking sewage systems. Water impoundments and offroad vehicle traffic also causes great harm to the species.
