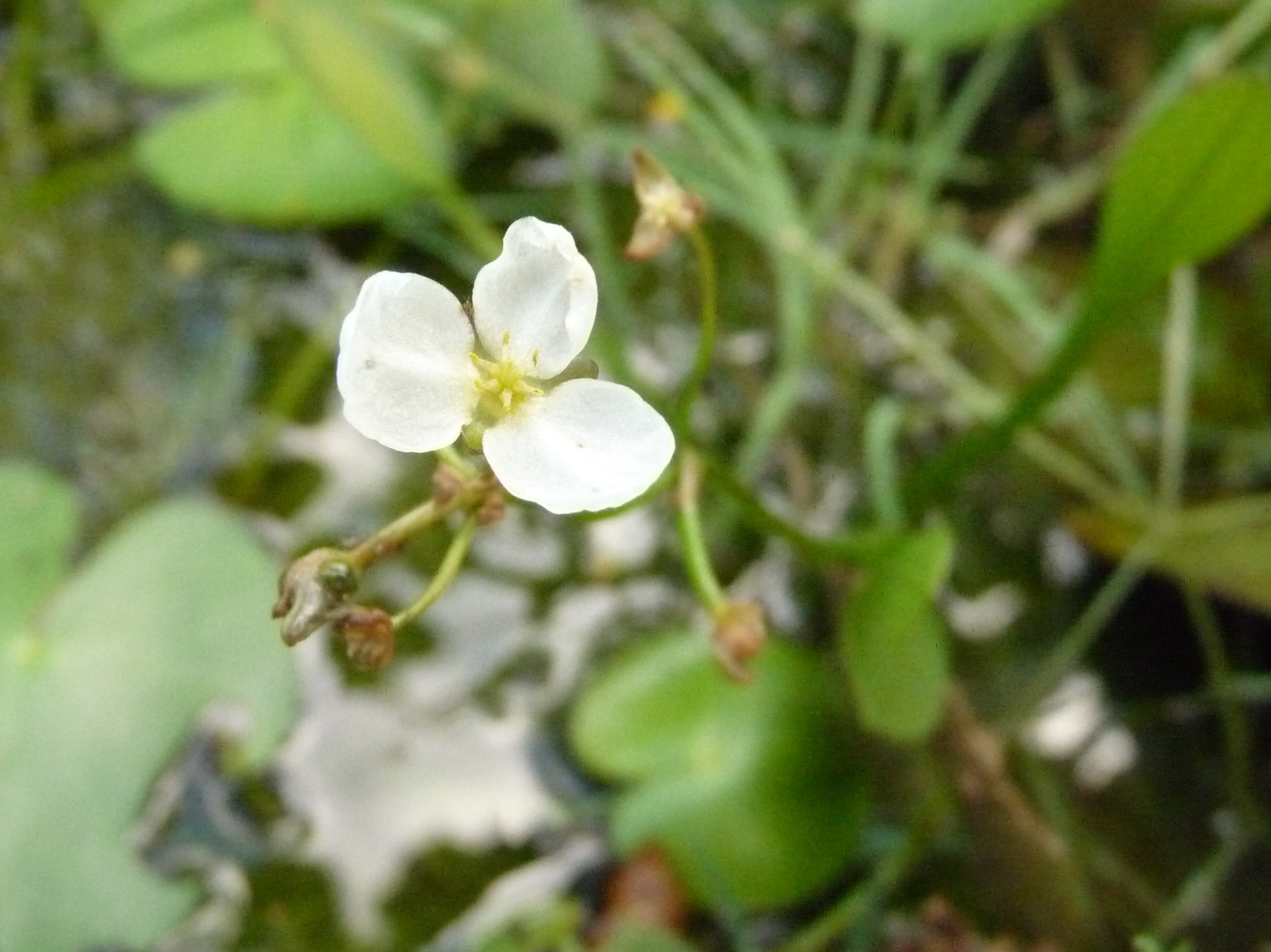

Scientific classification
- Kingdom: Plantae
- Clade: Tracheophytes
- Clade: Angiosperms
- Clade: Monocots
- Order: Alismatales
- Family: Alismataceae
- Genus: Sagittaria
- Species: S. pygmaea

Binomial name
- Sagittaria pygmaea Miq.

Synonyms
- Blyxa coreana (H.Lév.) Nakai; Hydrolirion coreanum H.Lév.; Sagittaria altigena Hand.-Mazz.; Sagittaria sagittifolia var. oligocarpa Micheli; Sagittaria sagittifolia var. pygmaea (Miq.) Makino

= Sagittaria pygmaea =

Species of aquatic plant

Sagittaria pygmaea, commonly known as the dwarf arrowhead or pygmy arrowhead, is an aquatic plant species. It is a perennial herb producing by means of stolons. Leaves are linear to slightly spatula-shaped, not lobed, up to 30 centimetres (12 inches) long.

It is native to Japan (including the Ryukyu Islands), Korea, Taiwan, Thailand, Vietnam, Bhutan and China (Anhui, Fujian, Guangdong, Guangxi, Guizhou, Hainan, Henan, Hubei, Hunan, Jiangsu, Jiangxi, Shaanxi, Shandong, Sichuan, Yunnan, Zhejiang). It grows in shallow water in marshes, channels and rice paddies.
