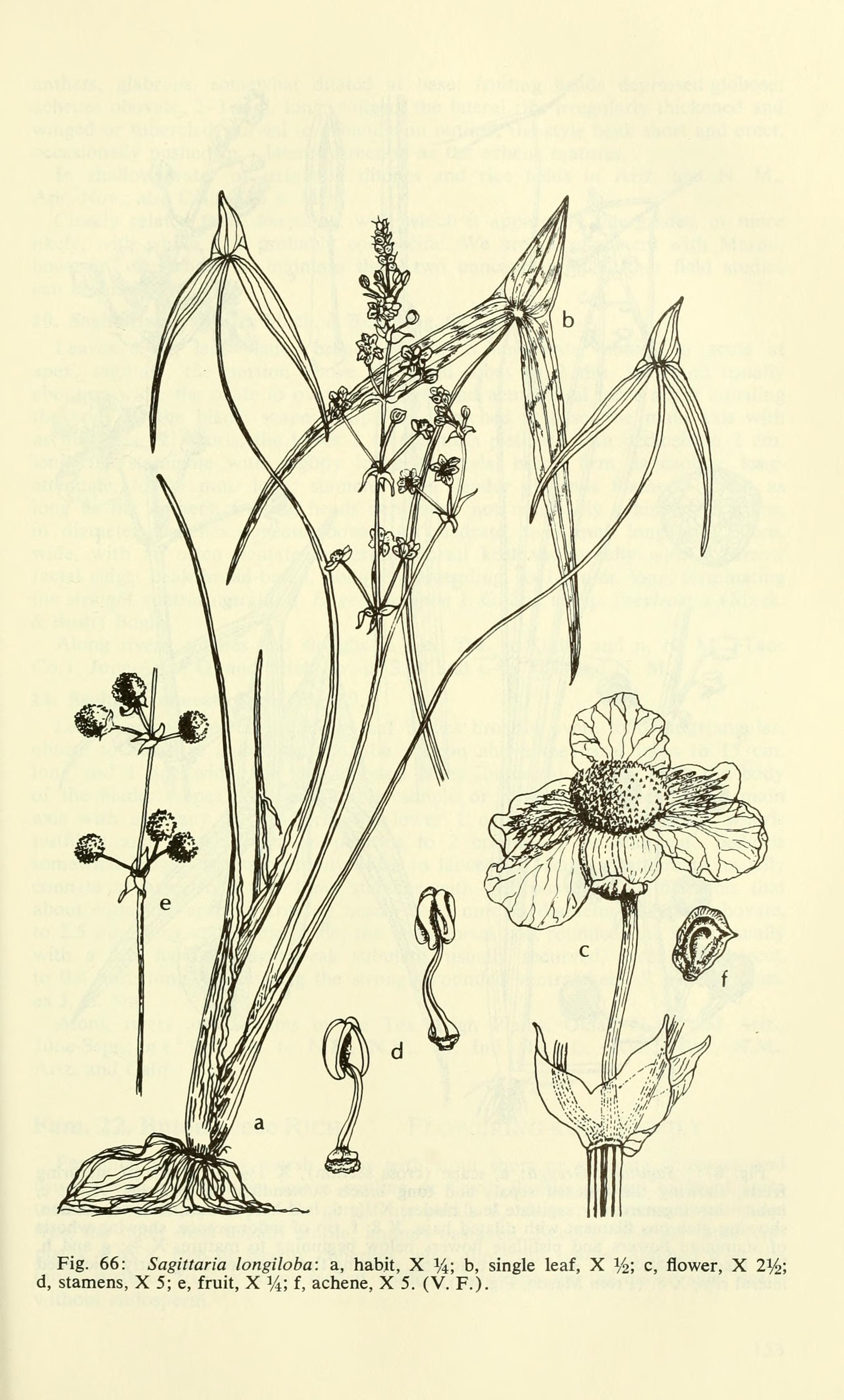

Scientific classification
- Kingdom: Plantae
- Clade: Tracheophytes
- Clade: Angiosperms
- Clade: Monocots
- Order: Alismatales
- Family: Alismataceae
- Genus: Sagittaria
- Species: S. longiloba

Binomial name
- Sagittaria longiloba Engelm. ex J.G.Sm.

Synonyms
- Sagittaria greggii J.G.Sm.; Sagittaria sagittifolia var. mexicana M.Martens & Galeotti

= Sagittaria longiloba =

Species of aquatic plant

Sagittaria longiloba is a North American species of flowering plant in the water plantain family known by the common name longbarb arrowhead and Gregg arrowhead.

== Description ==
Sagittaria longiloba is a perennial aquatic plant growing from a spherical tuber. The leaves are sagittate, or shaped like arrowheads with two longer, narrower, pointed lobes opposite the shorter tip. The leaf blades are borne on very long petioles. The plant is monoecious, with individuals bearing both male and female flowers. The inflorescence which rises above the surface of the water is a raceme made up of several whorls of flowers, the lowest node bearing female flowers and upper nodes bearing male flowers. The flower is up to 3 centimeters wide with three white petals. The male flowers have rings of stamens at the centers. Female flowers each have a spherical cluster of pistils which develops into a head of tiny fruits.

== Distribution and habitat ==
It is native to the south-central and southwestern United States (Texas, New Mexico, Oklahoma, Kansas, Nebraska, Arizona and California) plus Mexico, Venezuela and Nicaragua. It is also reportedly naturalized in the western Himalayas of India and Bhutan. It grows in slow-moving, stagnant, and ephemeral water bodies such as ponds and small streams, and sometimes disturbed and cultivated habitat such as rice fields and irrigation ditches.
