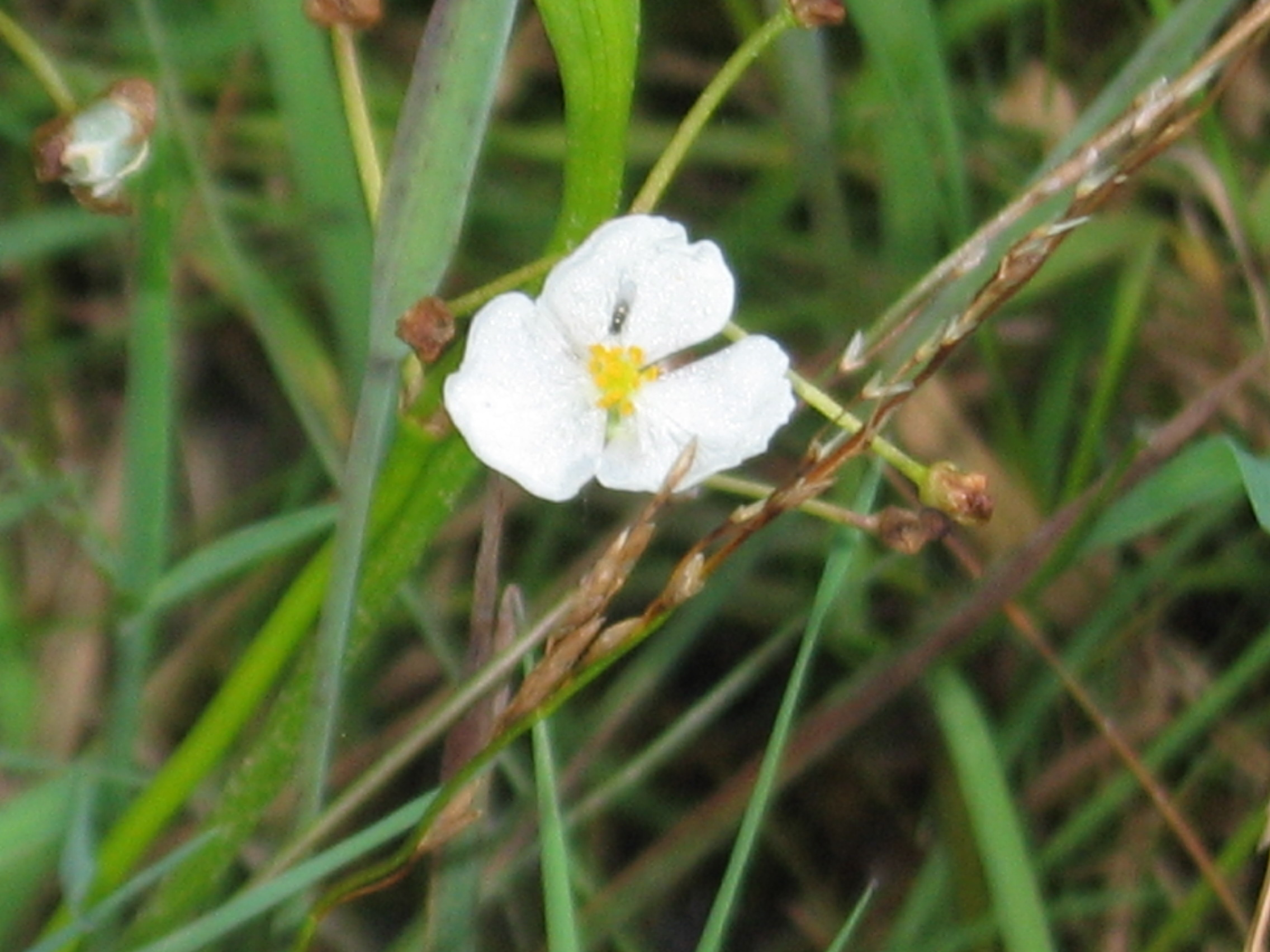

Conservation status
- Secure (NatureServe)

Scientific classification
- Kingdom: Plantae
- Clade: Tracheophytes
- Clade: Angiosperms
- Clade: Monocots
- Order: Alismatales
- Family: Alismataceae
- Genus: Sagittaria
- Species: S. graminea

Binomial name
- Sagittaria graminea Michx.

Synonyms
- Diphorea graminea (Michx.) Raf.; Sagitta graminea (Michx.) Nieuwl.; Sagittaria cycloptera (J.G.Sm.) C.Mohr; Sagittaria eatonii J.G.Sm.; Sagittaria repens J.J.Singer.; Sagittaria edwardsiana R.T.Clausen; Sagittaria graminea var. cycloptera J.G.Sm.; Sagittaria graminea subsp. edwardsiana (R.T.Clausen) R.T.Clausen; Sagittaria graminea var. elliptica N.Coleman; Sagittaria purshii Rich. ex Kunth; Sagittaria sagittifolia var. simplex Hook.; Sagittaria simplex Torr.; Sagittaria stolonifera Engelm. & A.Gray

= Sagittaria graminea =

Grass-leaved arrowhead

Species of aquatic plant

Sagittaria graminea, the grassy arrowhead or grass-leaved arrowhead, is an aquatic plant species native to eastern North America.

== Description ==
It is a perennial herb up to 100 centimetres (39 inches) tall with narrow, grass-like leaves about 20 cm (8 in) in length and 2.5 cm (1 in) wide. A very thin flower-bearing stalk raises to about 60 cm (24 in) above water. The flowers are about 1.5 cm (5/8 in) wide, with three petals and three sepals; typically the upper flowers only have stamens (male), while lower flowers have only pistils (female). The seeds appear in a head about 1.5 cm wide.

== Subspecies ==
A long list of varietal and subspecific names have been proposed over the years. Most have either been elevated to the species level or relegated to synonymy. As of April 2014, only two are recognized:

- Sagittaria graminea subsp. graminea
- Sagittaria graminea subsp. weatherbiana (Fernald) R.R.Haynes & Hellq.

== Distribution and habitat ==
The species is known from every Canadian province from Ontario to Newfoundland, and every US state from the Great Plains to the Atlantic, plus Colorado, New Mexico and Cuba. It is considered naturalized in Washington state and in Vietnam. It grows in wet areas such as marshes and the banks of rivers and lakes.
