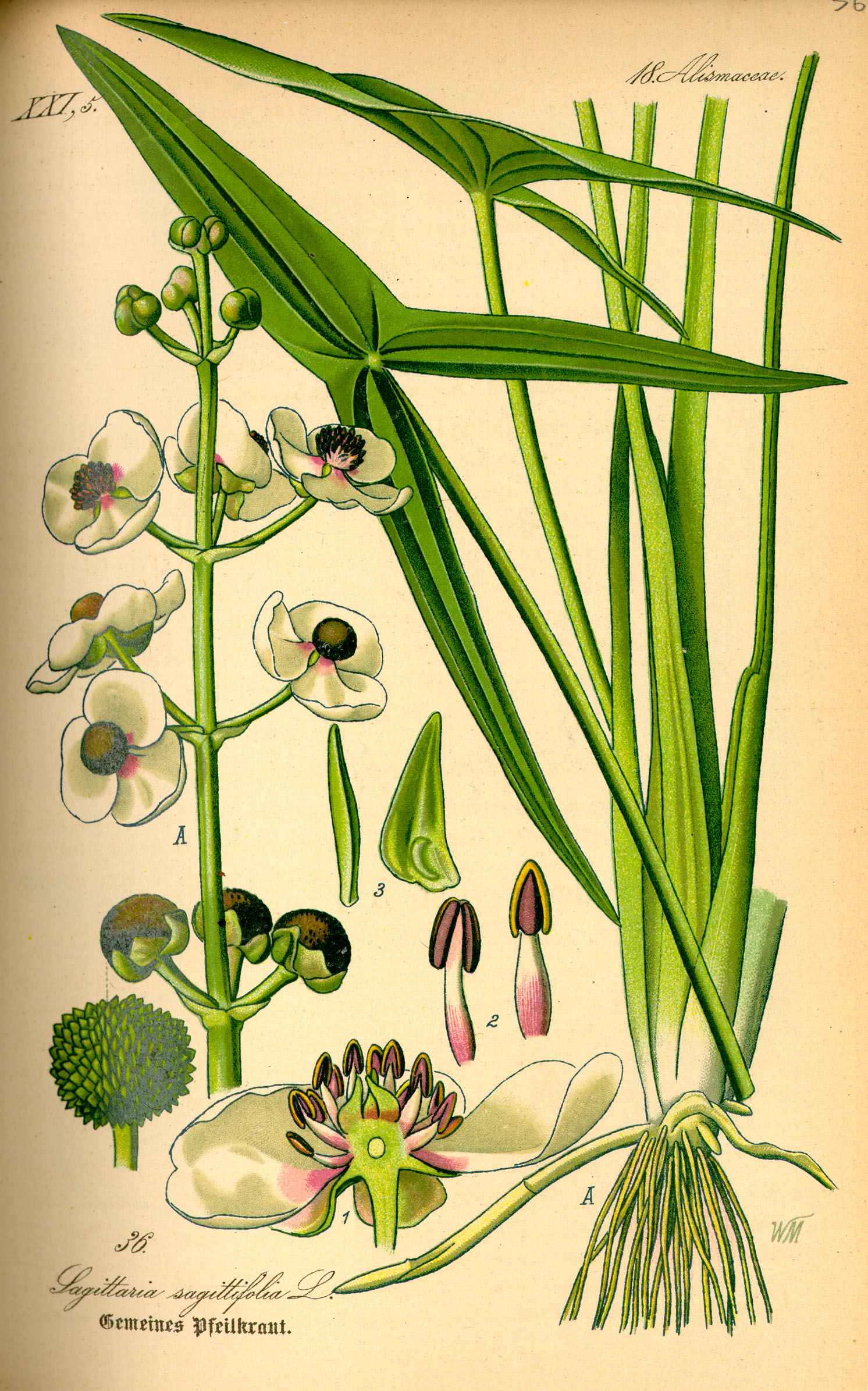
- S. sagittifolia 1885 illustration

Scientific classification
- Kingdom: Plantae
- Clade: Tracheophytes
- Clade: Angiosperms
- Clade: Monocots
- Order: Alismatales
- Family: Alismataceae
- Genus: Sagittaria; L.

Type species
- Sagittaria sagittifolia L.

Synonyms
- Sagitta Guett.; Diphorea Raf.; Drepachenia Raf.; Lophiocarpus (Kunth) Miq., illegitimate; Lophotocarpus T.Durand; Hydrolirion H.Lév.

= Sagittaria =

Genus of aquatic plants

Sagittaria is a genus of about 30 species of aquatic plants whose members are referred to by the Chinook Jargon word wapato (/ˈwɒpətoʊ/) and a variety of other common names, including arrowhead, duck potato, swamp potato, tule potato, and katniss. Most are native to South, Central, and North America, but there are also some from Europe, Africa, and Asia.

== Description ==
Sagittaria plant stock (the perennial rhizome) is a horizontal creeper (stoloniferous). The leaf grows up to .3–.9 metres (1–3 ft) tall, with a shape resembling an arrowhead. Between July and September, a single stalk bears groups of three white flowers with three petals each. It is obliquely obovate, the margins winged, with an apical or ventral beak; in other words, they are a small, dry, one-seeded fruit that do not open to release the seed, set on a slant, narrower at the base, with winged edges, and having a "beaked" aperture (one side longer than the other) for sprouting, set above or below the fruit body.

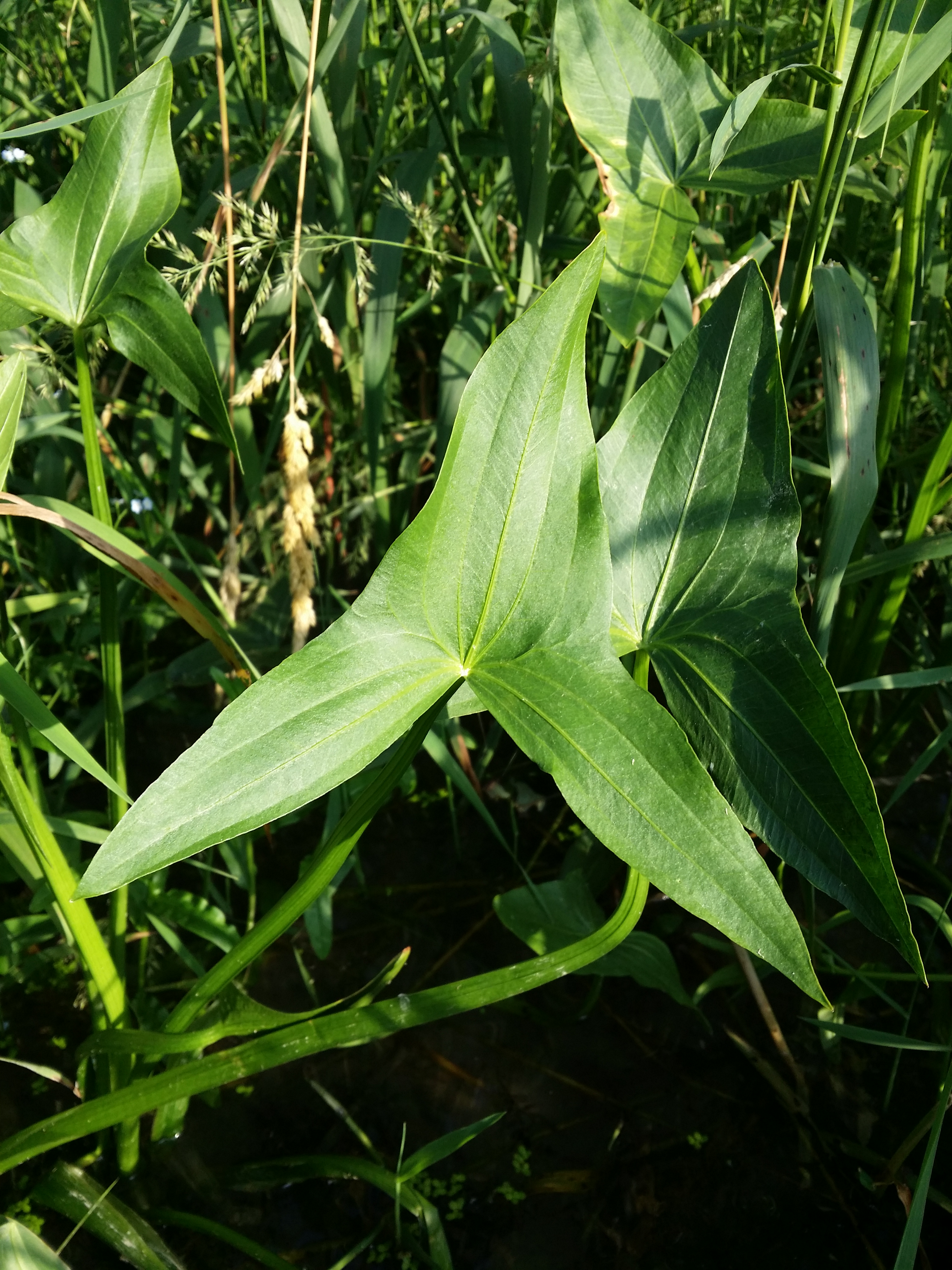
Arrow-shaped leaves of S. sagittifolia

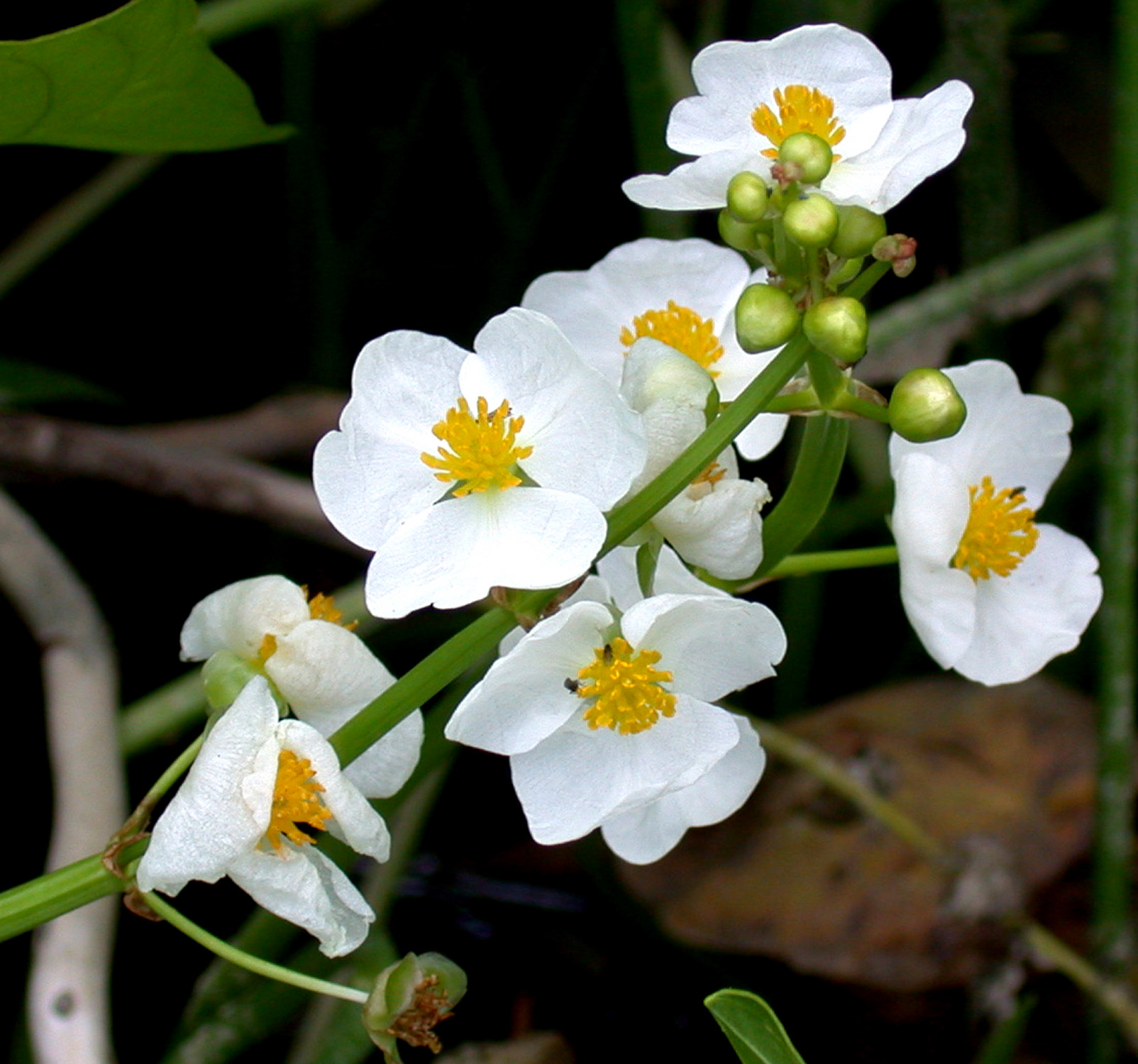
S. latifolia flowers

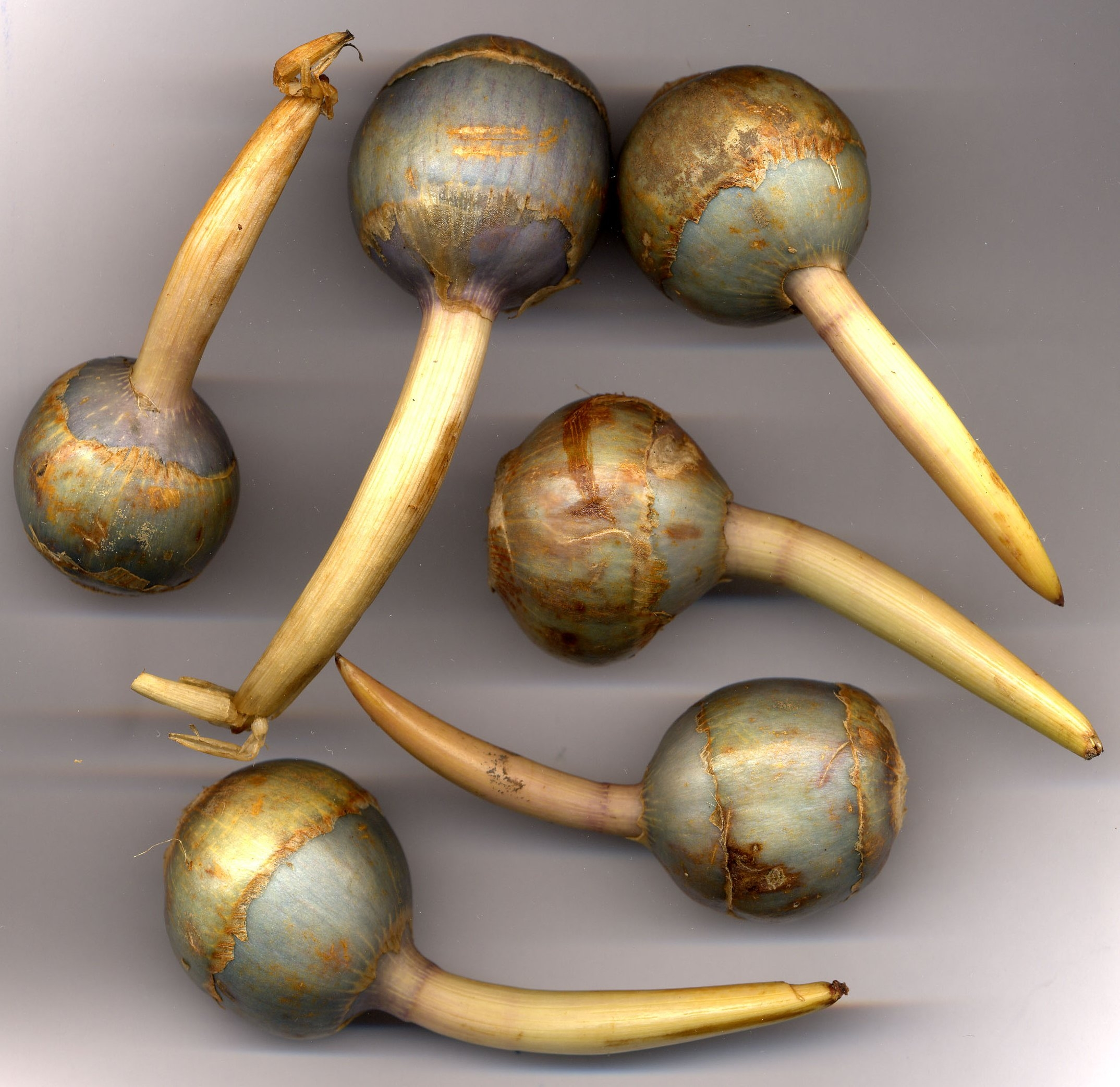
S. trifolia bulbs

== Taxonomy ==
=== Species ===
As of December 2023 accepted species include:

- Sagittaria aginashii Makino – Japan, Korea, Primorye
- Sagittaria ambigua J.G.Sm. – Missouri Arrowhead – from Oklahoma to Indiana
- Sagittaria australis (J.G.Sm.) Small – Appalachian Arrowhead – southeastern US from Louisiana to Florida and as far north as Iowa and New Jersey
- Sagittaria brevirostra Mack. & Bush – Shortbeak Arrowhead – central US (Great Plains, Mississippi and Ohio Valleys, Great Lakes); also Virginia and Saskatchewan; naturalized in California
- Sagittaria calycina Engelm. – Central & S. U.S.A. to N. Mexico.
- Sagittaria chapmanii (J.G.Sm.) C.Mohr – from Texas to the Carolinas
- Sagittaria cristata Engelm – Crested arrowhead – Great Lakes region
- Sagittaria cuneata E.P.Sheld. – Wapato, Northern Arrowhead, Swamp Potato – most of Canada including Yukon and Northwest Territories; Alaska; western and northeastern US
- Sagittaria demersa J.G.Sm. – Chihuahuan arrowhead – New Mexico, northeastern Mexico
- Sagittaria engelmanniana J.G.Sm. – Engelmann's arrowhead – eastern US from Mississippi to Vermont
- Sagittaria fasciculata E.O.Beal – Bunched Arrowhead – North and South Carolina
- Sagittaria filiformis J.G.Sm. – Threadleaf Arrowhead – eastern US from Alabama to Maine
- Sagittaria graminea Michx. – Grassy Arrowhead, Grass-leaved Arrowhead – Cuba; much of eastern and central US; eastern Canada; naturalized in Washington State and in Vietnam
- Sagittaria guayanensis Kunth – Guyanese Arrowhead – widespread across Latin America, the West Indies, China, India, Southeast Asia; introduced into Louisiana
- Sagittaria intermedia Micheli in A.L.P.P.de Candolle & A.C.P.de Candolle – Greater Antilles, Colombia, southern Mexico
- Sagittaria isoetiformis J.G.Sm. – Quillwort Arrowhead – Cuba, from Florida, Georgia, Alabama, Mississippi, Carolinas
- Sagittaria kurziana Glück – Springtape or Strap-leaf Sagittaria – Florida; naturalized in Mariana Islands
- Sagittaria lancifolia L. – Bulltongue Arrowhead – southeastern US from Texas to Delaware; West Indies; Latin America from southern Mexico to Brazil
- Sagittaria latifolia Willd. – Duck-potato, Broad-leaved Arrowhead, Wapato – widespread across most of North America, the West Indies and northern South America; naturalized in Hawaii, the western Himalayas and parts of Europe
- Sagittaria lichuanensis J.K.Chen, X.Z.Sun & H.Q.Wang – southern China
- Sagittaria longiloba Engelm. ex J.G. Sm. – Longbarb Arrowhead – southern Great Plains, Arizona, New Mexico, California, Mexico, Nicaragua, Venezuela
- Sagittaria × lunata C.D.Preston & Uotila – Sweden, Finland, northern Russia (S. natans × S. sagittifolia)
- Sagittaria macrocarpa J.G.Sm. – Large-fruited Arrowhead – North and South Carolina
- Sagittaria macrophylla Zucc. – Papa de agua – Mexico
- Sagittaria montevidensis Cham. & Schltdl. – California Arrowhead – widespread across much of US, Mexico and South America
- Sagittaria natans Pall. – widespread across northern Europe and Asia from Sweden to Kamchatka; Russia, China, Kazakhstan, Japan, Korea
- Sagittaria papillosa Buchenau – Nipplebract Arrowhead – Texas, Louisiana, Mississippi, Arkansas, Oklahoma
- Sagittaria planitiana G.Agostini – Brazil, Venezuela
- Sagittaria platyphylla (Engelm.) J.G.Sm. – Delta Arrowhead, Delta Duck-potato – south-central US with scattered populations in southeast, the Ohio Valley and Washington State; also Mexico and Panama; naturalized in South Australia, Italy, Java, Caucasus
- Sagittaria potamogetifolia Merr. – southern China
- Sagittaria pygmaea Miq. – Pygmy arrowhead – China, Japan, Korea, Himalayas, Thailand, Vietnam
- Sagittaria rhombifolia Cham. – Costa Rica; widespread across much of South America
- Sagittaria rigida Pursh. – Canadian Arrowhead – Canada from Quebec to Saskatchewan; common in northeastern and north-central US from Arkansas and Nebraska east to Virginia and New England; scattered populations in California, Idaho, Oregon, and Washington State; naturalised in Great Britain
- Sagittaria sagittifolia L. – Arrowhead – widespread across most of Europe; Siberia, Caucasus, Turkey
- Sagittaria sanfordii Greene – Valley Arrowhead – endemic to California
- Sagittaria secundifolia Kral – Little River Arrowhead – Georgia and Alabama
- Sagittaria siamaginashi Shiga & K.Itoh – Myanmar to Thailand
- Sagittaria spatulata (J.G.Sm.) Buchenau - New Brunswick to Maryland.
- Sagittaria sprucei Micheli in A.L.P.P.de Candolle & A.C.P.de Candolle – Colombia, Peru, Venezuela, northern Brazil
- Sagittaria subulata L. Buchenau – Narrow-leaved Arrowhead – eastern US from Louisiana to Massachusetts; naturalized in Great Britain, Azores and Java
- Sagittaria tengtsungensis H.Li – Tibet, Nepal, Bhutan, Yunnan
- Sagittaria teres S.Watson – Slender Arrowhead – northeastern US
- Sagittaria trifolia L. – Threeleaf Arrowhead – widespread across much of Asia including Siberia, China, Japan, India, Iran, Indonesia, Philippines, etc.; also Ukraine and European Russia; naturalized in Fiji and Polynesia
- Sagittaria weatherbiana Fernald –Florida, Georgia, North Carolina, South Carolina, Virginia

==== Deprecated ====
- Echinodorus palaefolius (Nees & Mart.) J.F.Macbr. (as S. palaefolia Nees & Mart.)
- Limnophyton obtusifolium (L.) Miq. (as S. obtusifolia L.)
- Wiesneria triandra (Dalzell) Micheli (as S. triandra Dalzell)

=== Etymology ===
The genus comes from the Latin word sagittārius, meaning 'pertaining to arrows', owing to the leaf shape of many species.

== Uses ==
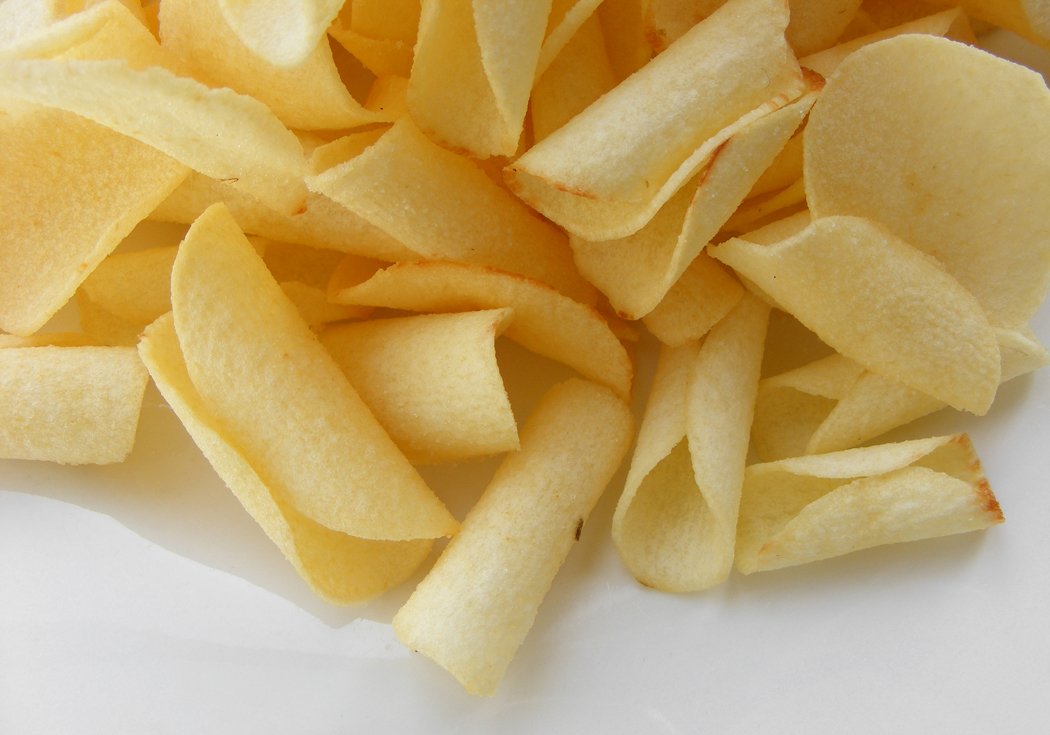
Tuber crisps (chips)

Many species have edible roots, prized for millennia as a reliable source of starch and carbohydrates, even during the winter. Some are edible raw, though are less bitter when cooked. They can be harvested by hand or by treading the mud in late fall or early spring, causing light root tubers to float to the surface. The plants are easy to propagate by replanting the roots.

Native American peoples such as the Algonquian, Kalapuya, Omaha, Pawnee, and Winnebago use the tubers for food, prepared by boiling or roasting. They were also planted and eaten in China.

== In culture ==
Other names are Pshitola (Dakota), Si" (Omaha-Ponca), Si-poro (Winnebago) and Kirit (Pawnee), 'cricket' (from the likeness of the tuber to the form of a cricket); known also as kits-hat, 'standing in water', the tuber being termed kirit.

Sagittaria is mentioned in the Omaha myths "Ishtinike and the Four Creators" and "How the Big Turtle Went to War".

In 1749, Peter Kalm mentioned Sagittaria as a food plant among the Algonquian peoples:

Katniss is another Indian name of a plant, the root of which they were likewise accustomed to eat, ... It grows in low, muddy, and very wet ground. The root is oblong, commonly an inch and a half long, and one inch and a quarter broad in the middle; but some of the roots have been as big as a man's fists. The Indians either boiled this root or roasted it in hot ashes. ... Their katniss is an arrow-head or Sagittaria, and is only a variety of the Swedish arrow-head or Sagittaria sagittifolia, for the plant above the ground is entirely the same, but the root under ground is much greater in the American than in the European.

American explorers Lewis and Clark used arrowhead tubers to survive the winter of 1805–1806.

Katniss Everdeen of the Hunger Games franchise was named after Sagittaria.
