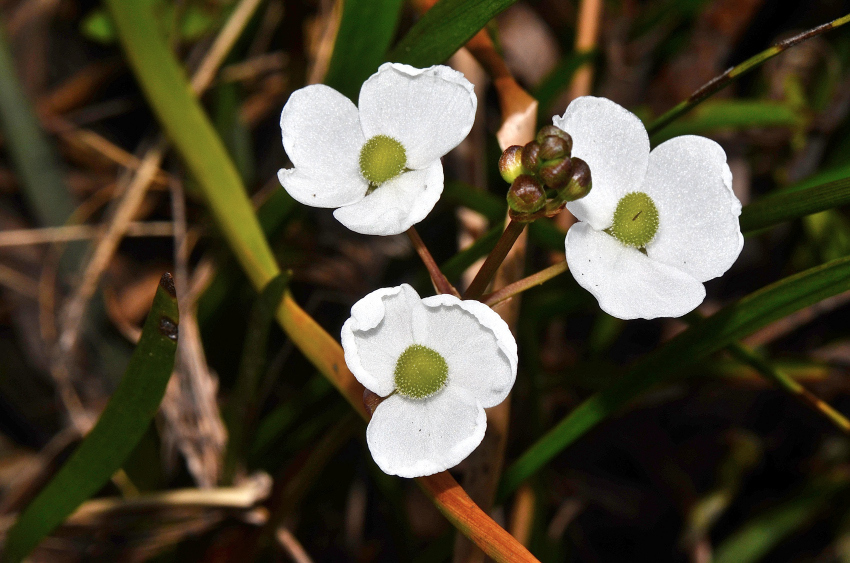

Scientific classification
- Kingdom: Plantae
- Clade: Tracheophytes
- Clade: Angiosperms
- Clade: Monocots
- Order: Alismatales
- Family: Alismataceae
- Genus: Sagittaria
- Species: S. filiformis

Binomial name
- Sagittaria filiformis J.G.Sm.

Synonyms
- Sagittaria natans Michx.; Sagittaria natans var. gracillima S.Watson; Sagittaria stagnorum Small; Sagittaria storiflexum B.Bagmor.; Sagittaria subulata var. gracillima (S.Watson) J.G.Sm.; Sagittaria subulata var. natans J.G.Sm.

= Sagittaria filiformis =

Threadleaf arrowhead

Species of aquatic plant

Sagittaria filiformis, the threadleaf arrowhead, is a perennial aquatic plant growing up to 170 centimetres (67 inches) tall. Some leaves are thread-like, entirely underwater, but others are narrowly ovate or lanceolate and floating on the surface.

The species is native to the eastern United States, from Maine south to Florida and Alabama. It occurs in flowing streams in the northern part of its range, but more stagnant waters such as marshes and swamps in the South.
