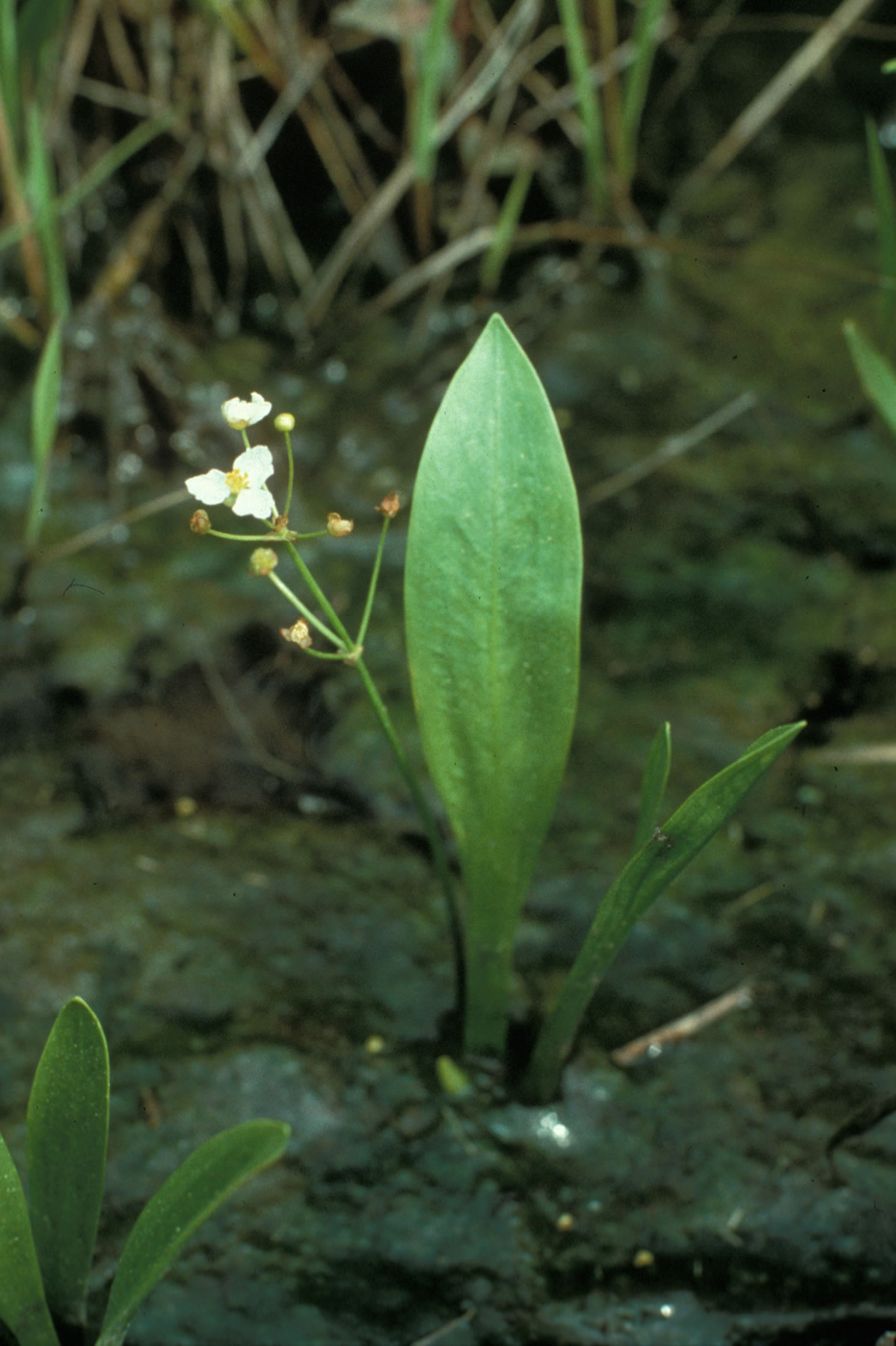

Conservation status
- Imperiled (NatureServe)

Scientific classification
- Kingdom: Plantae
- Clade: Tracheophytes
- Clade: Angiosperms
- Clade: Monocots
- Order: Alismatales
- Family: Alismataceae
- Genus: Sagittaria
- Species: S. fasciculata

Binomial name
- Sagittaria fasciculata E.O. Beal

= Sagittaria fasciculata =

Bunched arrowhead

Species of aquatic plant

Sagittaria fasciculata, the bunched arrowhead (also known as duck potato, Indian potato, or wapato) is a plant found in a small number of wetlands in the Southeast United States.

== Description ==
Sagittaria fasciculata is a perennial herb up to 35 centimetres (14 inches) tall. Submerged leaves are long and narrow, round in cross-section. Emerging leaves are flat, broadly ovate or lanceolate.

== Distribution and habitat ==
S. fasciculata is only known to be found in Henderson and Buncombe Counties in North Carolina plus Greenville and Laurens Counties in South Carolina.

It is found in seepage areas with little to no flow. It prefers shaded areas on sandy loams.

== Conservation ==
It was considered endangered in the federal register of July 25, 1979.

== Uses ==
This plant produces edible tubers that were heavily collected by Native Americans as a food source.
