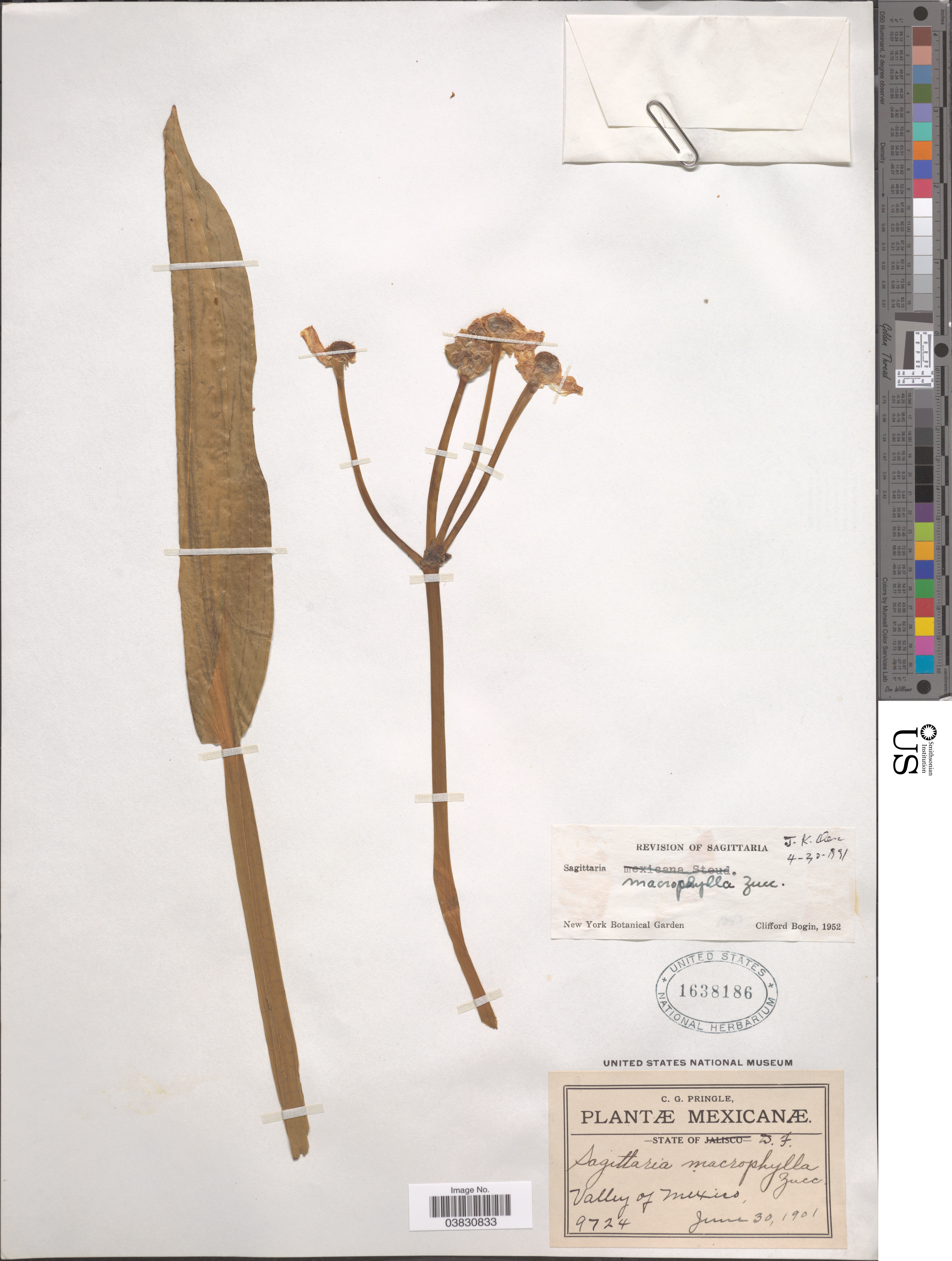

Scientific classification
- Kingdom: Plantae
- Clade: Tracheophytes
- Clade: Angiosperms
- Clade: Monocots
- Order: Alismatales
- Family: Alismataceae
- Genus: Sagittaria
- Species: S. macrophylla

Binomial name
- Sagittaria macrophylla Zucc.

= Sagittaria macrophylla =

Species of aquatic plant

Sagittaria macrophylla, common name papa de agua, is an aquatic plant species. It produces underground starchy tubers that are edible. It has large, hastate (arrow-shaped) leaves with blades up to 30 centimetres (12 inches) long. The terminal lobe is large and broadly lanceolate, while the two basal lobes are much smaller and narrower.

It is endemic to central Mexico (States of Jalisco, Michoacán, México, Hidalgo, and the Distrito Federal), primarily in the region close to the nation's capital. It grows in clean, shallow, slow-moving water. It is considered threatened by habitat destruction due to urbanization.

The tubers and those of other species of Sagittaria are a traditional food source in central Mexico, referred to as papa de agua ('water potato').
