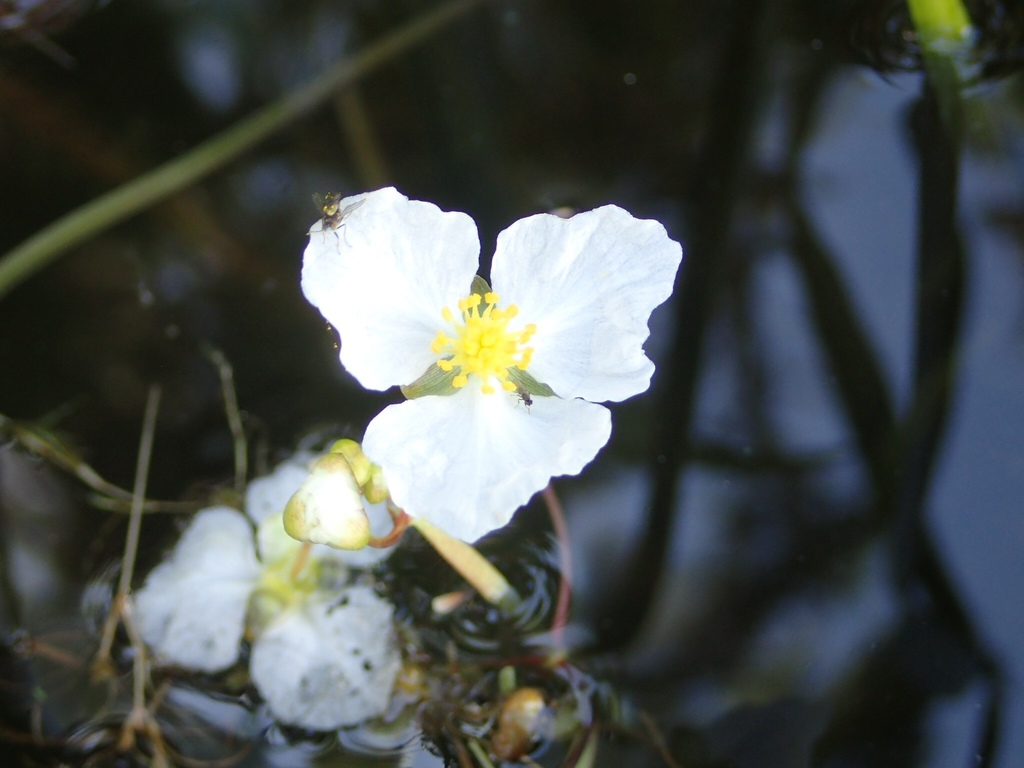

Scientific classification
- Kingdom: Plantae
- Clade: Tracheophytes
- Clade: Angiosperms
- Clade: Monocots
- Order: Alismatales
- Family: Alismataceae
- Genus: Sagittaria
- Species: S. cristata

Binomial name
- Sagittaria cristata Engelm. 1883

Synonyms
- Sagittaria graminea var. cristata (Engelm.) Bogin

= Sagittaria cristata =

Crested arrowhead

Species of aquatic plant

Sagittaria cristata, the crested arrowhead, is a perennial herb growing up to 75 centimetres (30 inches) tall. The leaves are flat, long and narrow, not lobed, and up to 40 cm (16 in) long. The flowers are white.

The species is native to Ontario and north-central United States (Illinois, Iowa, Minnesota, Missouri, Nebraska, Wisconsin, Michigan). It grows in shallow water along the edges of lakes, streams and marshes.
