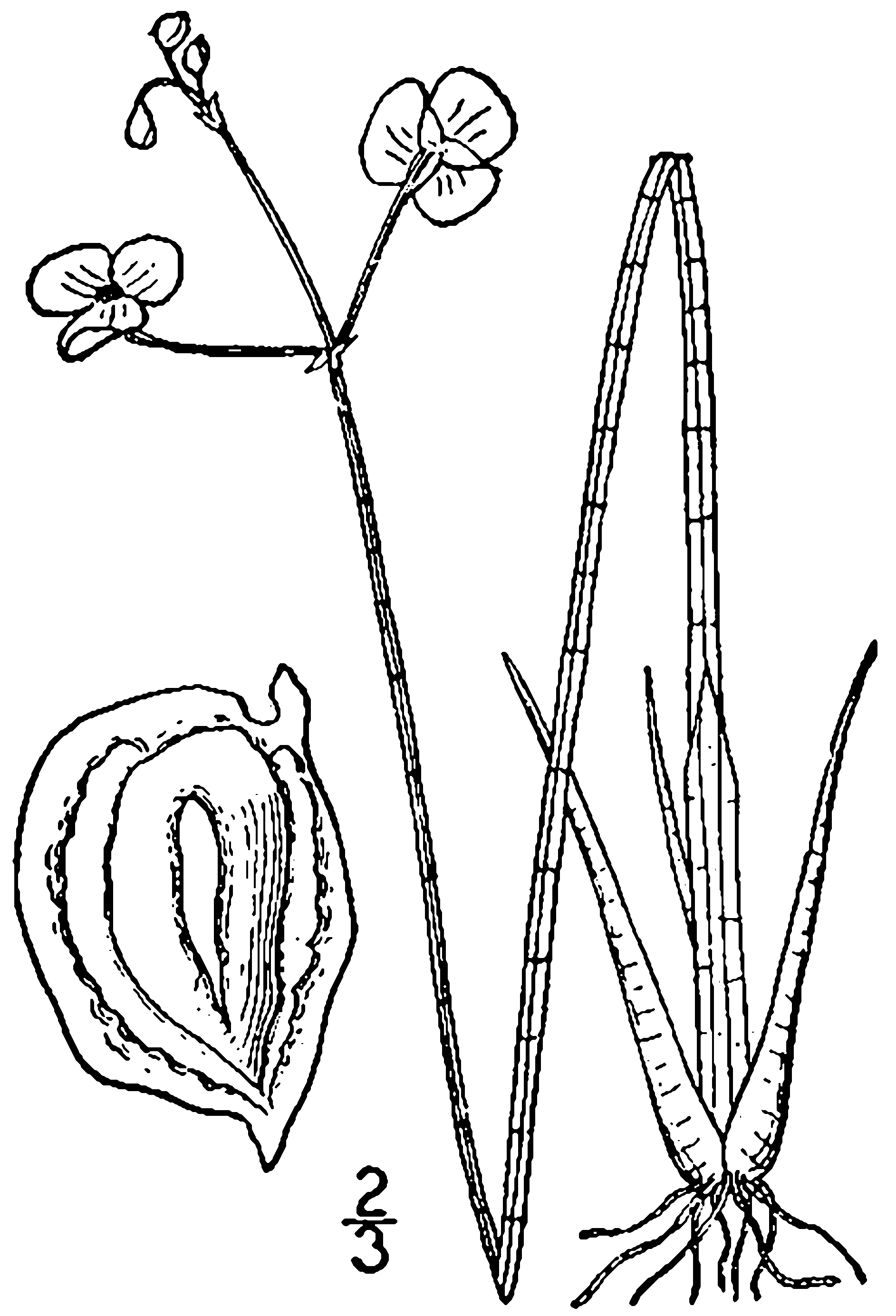

Scientific classification
- Kingdom: Plantae
- Clade: Tracheophytes
- Clade: Angiosperms
- Clade: Monocots
- Order: Alismatales
- Family: Alismataceae
- Genus: Sagittaria
- Species: S. teres

Binomial name
- Sagittaria teres S.Wats.

Synonyms
- Sagittaria graminea var. teres (S.Watson) Bogin

= Sagittaria teres =

Species of aquatic plant

Sagittaria teres, the quill-leaved arrowhead or slender arrowhead, is an aquatic plant species in the genus Sagittaria. It is a perennial herb up to 80 centimetres (31 inches) tall. The leaves can grow both under and above the water. The flowers are white, up to 1.5 cm (1/2 in) in diameter, borne in one or more whorls on a stalk rising above the leaves.

It is native to the northeastern United States: Rhode Island (Providence and Washington Counties), Massachusetts, New Hampshire (Hillsborough County), New York (Suffolk County) and New Jersey. It grows along the shores of lakes, marshes, and other wetlands, frequently those with acidic water such as Sphagnum bogs.

== Conservation ==
It is listed as endangered in Connecticut, New Jersey, New York, and Rhode Island. It is listed as a special concern in Massachusetts.
