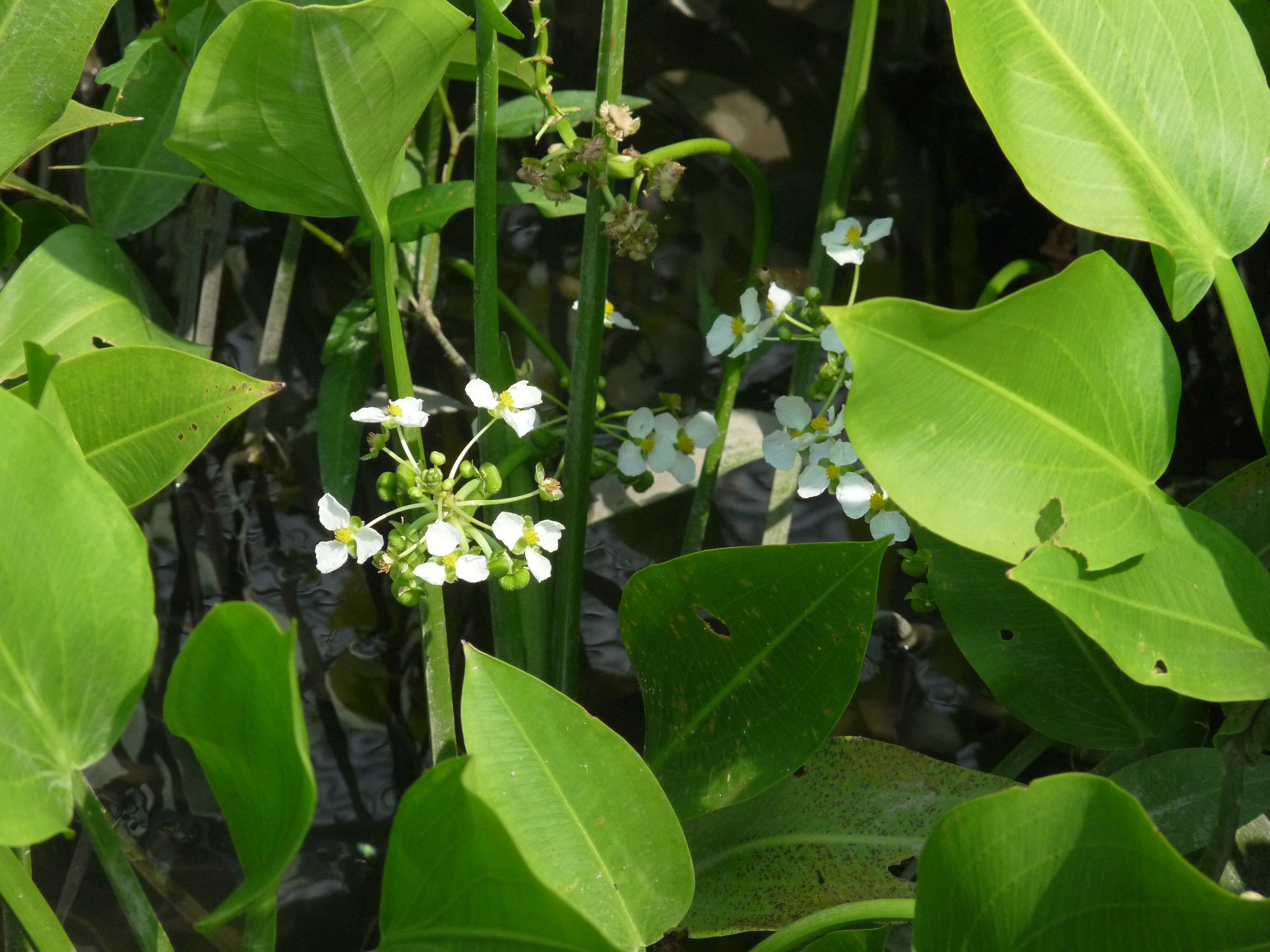

Scientific classification
- Kingdom: Plantae
- Clade: Tracheophytes
- Clade: Angiosperms
- Clade: Monocots
- Order: Alismatales
- Family: Alismataceae
- Genus: Sagittaria
- Species: S. platyphylla

Binomial name
- Sagittaria platyphylla (Engelm.) J.G. Sm.

Synonyms
- Sagittaria graminea var. platyphylla Engelm.; Sagittaria mohrii J.G. Sm. ex C. Mohr; Sagittaria recurva Engelm. ex Patt.

= Sagittaria platyphylla =

Species of aquatic plant

Sagittaria platyphylla, the delta arrowhead, broad-leaf arrowhead or delta duck-potato, is a plant species native to the eastern United States.

== Description ==
Sagittaria platyphylla is a perennial herb up to 150 centimetres (59 inches) tall, producing underground corms (similar to tubers). The plant reproduces by means of stolons as well as seeds. Some leaves are totally submerged, others emergent (raising above the surface of the water). Submerged leaves have flattened petioles but no true blades. Emergent leaves have ovate to elliptical blades up to 17 cm (7 in) long. Inflorescence is a raceme with 3–9 whorls of flowers. Flowers are white, up to 2 cm (3/4 in) in diameter.

== Distribution and habitat ==
The core of its range extends from central Texas to the Florida Panhandle north to southern Illinois. It is an emergent aquatic plant found in ponds, lakes and slow-moving streams.

As an ornamental it has also been spread to other locations. Isolated populations have been reported from Washington state, Oregon, Missouri, Kansas, Ohio, Kentucky, Pennsylvania, West Virginia, eastern Virginia, North and South Carolina and eastern Georgia, Nuevo León, Michoacán and Panama. It has also become a noxious weed in Australia. On August 6, 2015 S. platyphylla was found for the first time in China, specifically in the Yangtze River Basin. This detection was in an irrigation ditch in Zhangjiashai, Wuhan, Hubei, PRC. Other detections have continued through at least 2019 demonstrating its establishment in provinces of the middle and lower Yangtze. It presents a significant threat to the ecology and economy of the Yangtze area, especially to agricultural irrigation.
