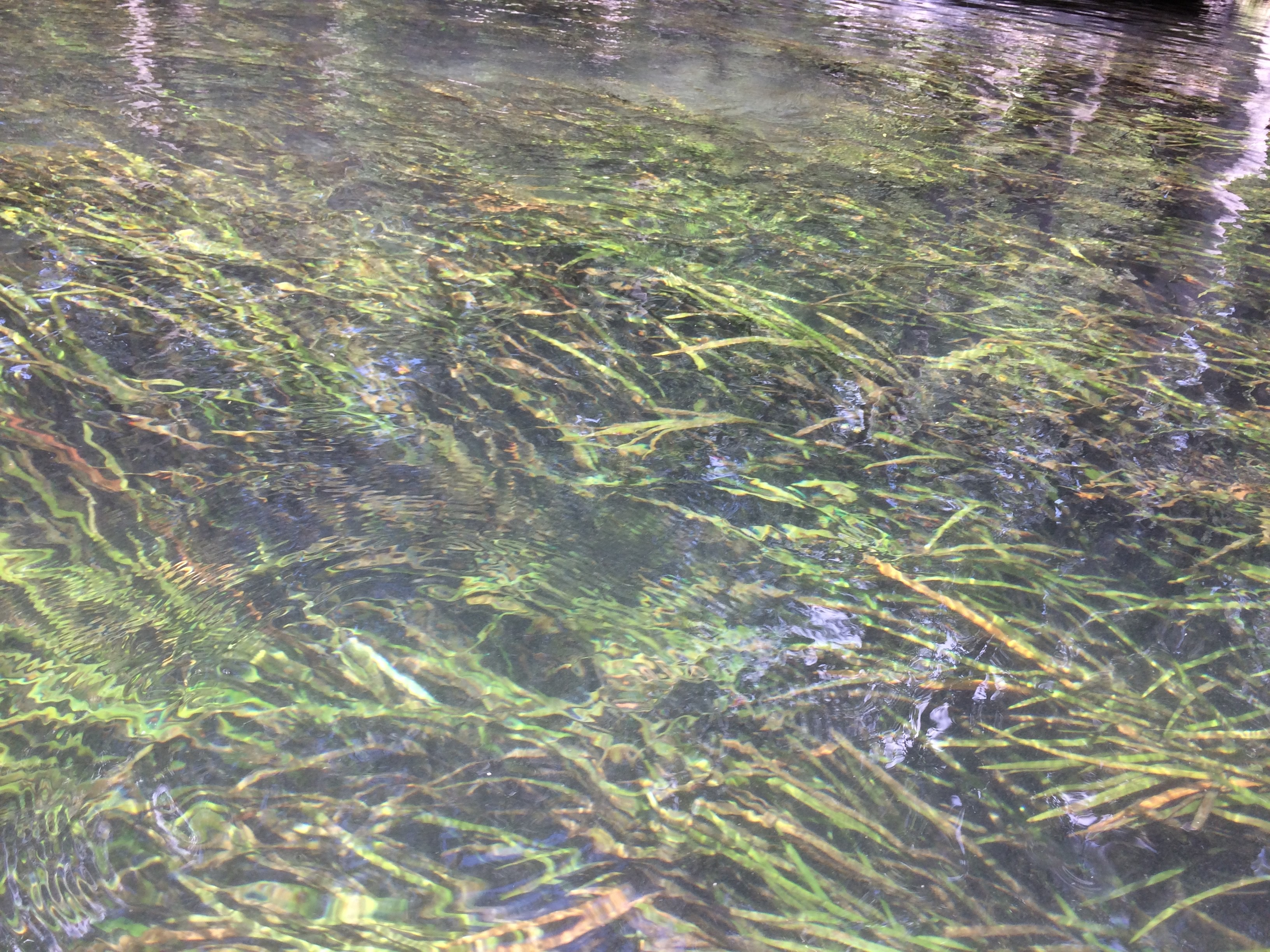

Scientific classification
- Kingdom: Plantae
- Clade: Tracheophytes
- Clade: Angiosperms
- Clade: Monocots
- Order: Alismatales
- Family: Alismataceae
- Genus: Sagittaria
- Species: S. kurziana

Binomial name
- Sagittaria kurziana Glück

Synonyms
- Sagittaria subulata var. kurziana (Glück) Bogin

= Sagittaria kurziana =

Species of aquatic plant

Sagittaria kurziana, common names springtape and strap-leaf sagittaria, is a perennial aquatic plant. It grows up to 250 centimetres (8 feet) tall. It has long, narrow, flat leaves that float on the surface of the water, up to 250 cm long but rarely more than 15 millimetres (1/2 inch) wide. These form huge masses of ribbon-like leaves flowing back and forth with the current. Inflorescences also float on the surface, the white flowers very often submerged.

The species is native to Florida and naturalized in the Mariana Islands. It grows along large springs, very often those with high sulfur content, and along the banks of watercourses downstream from such springs.
