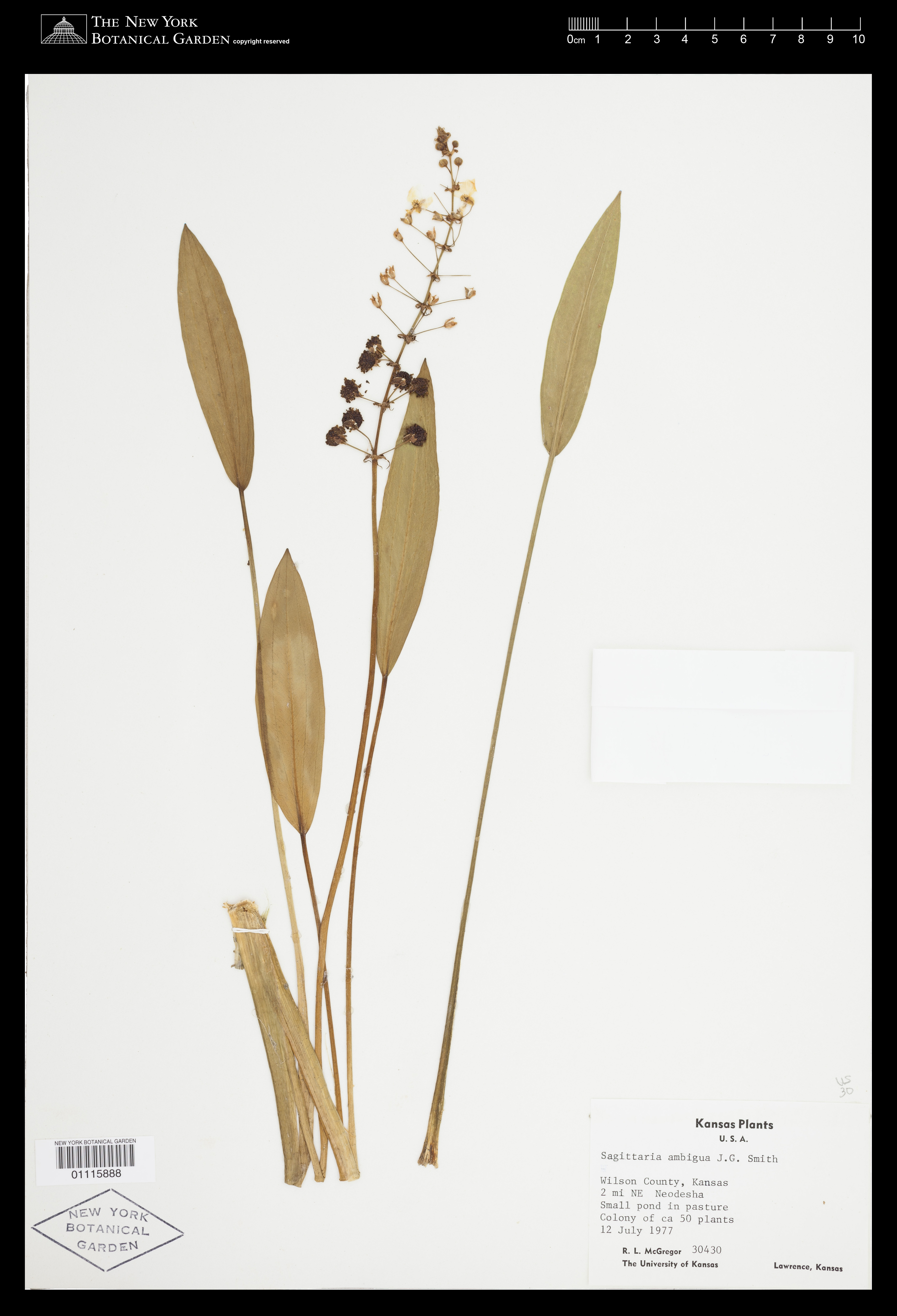

Scientific classification
- Kingdom: Plantae
- Clade: Tracheophytes
- Clade: Angiosperms
- Clade: Monocots
- Order: Alismatales
- Family: Alismataceae
- Genus: Sagittaria
- Species: S. ambigua

Binomial name
- Sagittaria ambigua J.G.Sm. 1894

= Sagittaria ambigua =

Kansas arrowhead

Species of aquatic plant

Sagittaria ambigua, the Kansas arrowhead, is an aquatic plant species native to North America. It is a perennial herb growing up to 90 centimetres (3 feet) tall. The leaves are broadly lanceolate, the blade up to 20 cm (8 in) long and 12 cm (4 1/2 in) wide.

It can be found in the central United States (Indiana, Illinois, Arkansas, Missouri, Kansas and Oklahoma) growing in wet areas, mostly along the shores of ponds and waterways.
