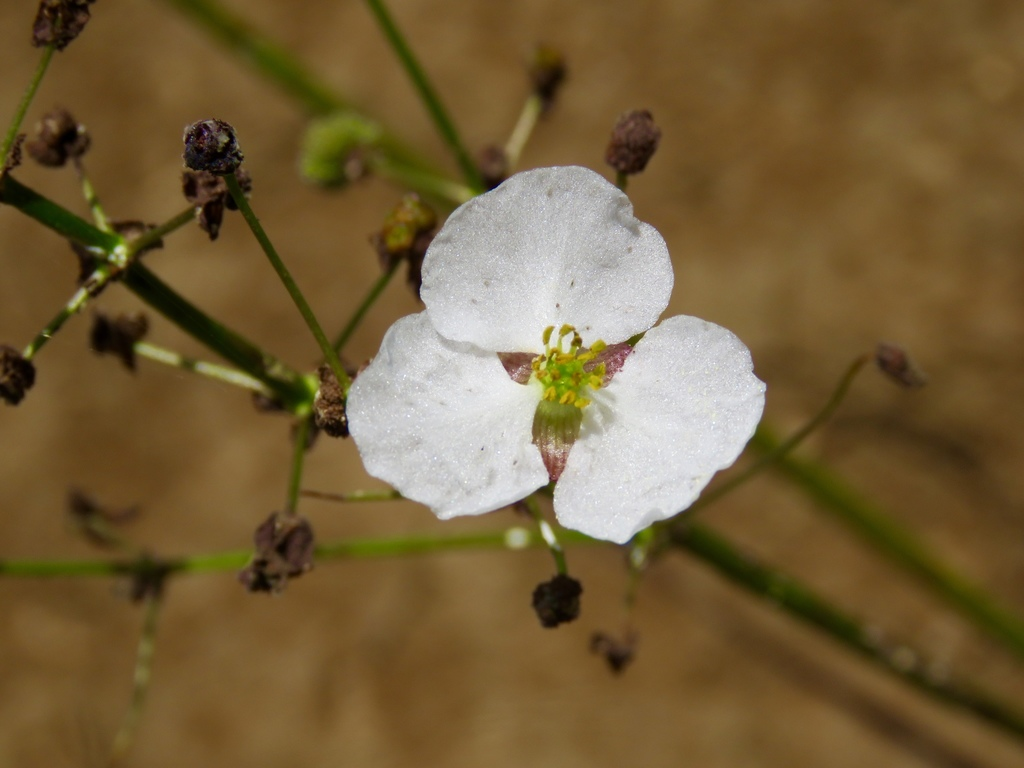

Scientific classification
- Kingdom: Plantae
- Clade: Tracheophytes
- Clade: Angiosperms
- Clade: Monocots
- Order: Alismatales
- Family: Alismataceae
- Genus: Sagittaria
- Species: S. papillosa

Binomial name
- Sagittaria papillosa Buchenau

Synonyms
- Sagittaria lancifolia var. papillosa (Buchenau) Micheli

= Sagittaria papillosa =

Nipplebract arrowhead

Species of aquatic plant

Sagittaria papillosa, the nipplebract arrowhead, is a perennial plant species growing up to 120 centimetres (47 inches) tall. Petioles are triangular in cross-section, the leaf blade very narrowly elliptical to ovate, not lobed. The species is distinguished from others in the genus by having bumps (papillae) resembling nipples on the flower bracts.

It is native to the south-central United States (Texas, Oklahoma, Louisiana, Arkansas and Mississippi). It grows in wet places such as marshes and the banks of lakes and slow-moving streams.
