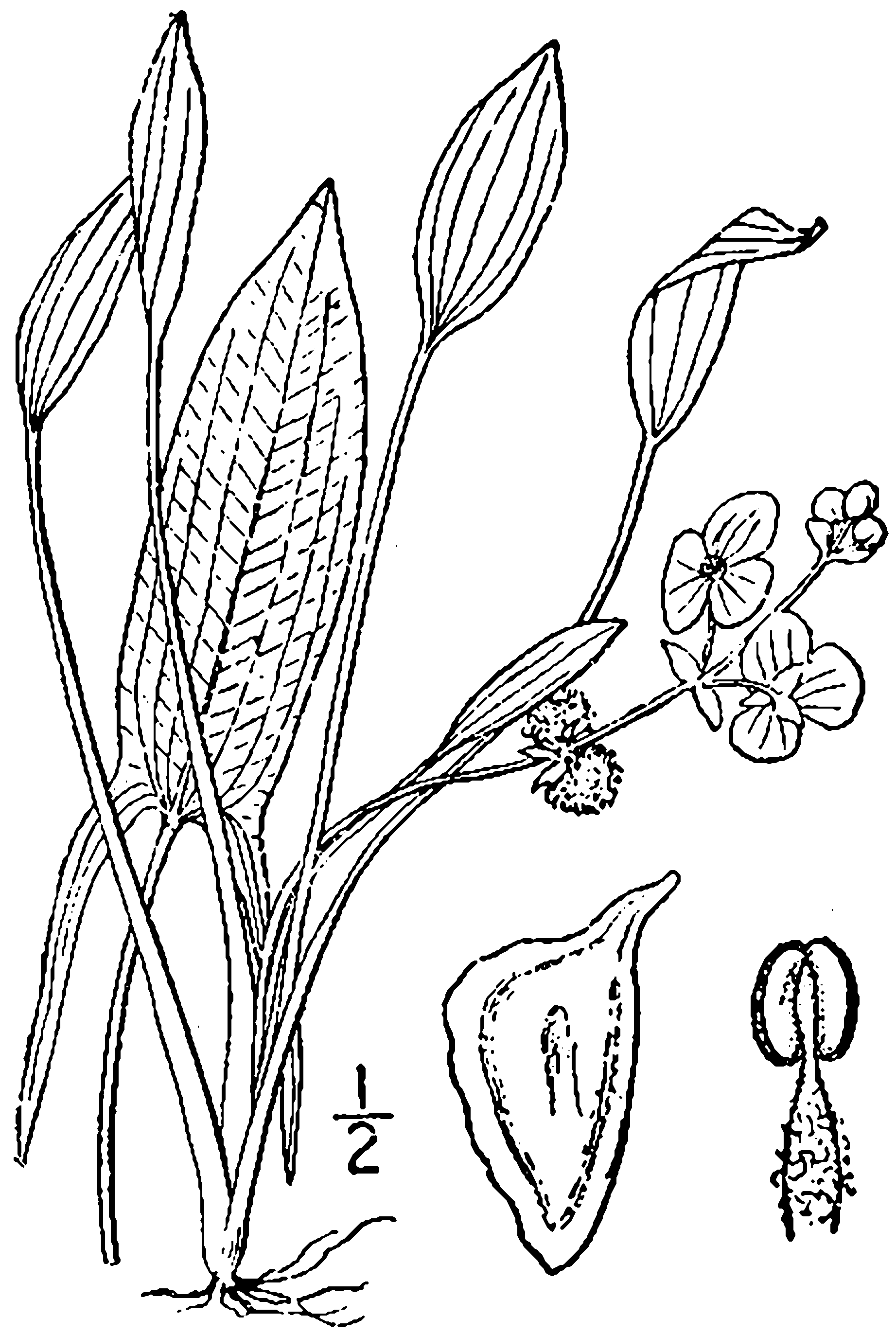

Scientific classification
- Kingdom: Plantae
- Clade: Tracheophytes
- Clade: Angiosperms
- Clade: Monocots
- Order: Alismatales
- Family: Alismataceae
- Genus: Sagittaria
- Species: S. rigida

Binomial name
- Sagittaria rigida Pursh

Synonyms
- Sagitta rigida (Pursh) Nieuwl.; Sagittaria sagittifolia var. rigida (Pursh) Torr.

= Sagittaria rigida =

Species of aquatic plant

Sagittaria rigida, the sessilefruit arrowhead or Canadian arrowhead, is an aquatic plant species. It has narrow oval leaves rather than the iconic arrowhead shaped leaves of species like the Sagittaria latifolia. it has sessile female flowers, from whence its name comes. Its flowers are very similar to other plants in the Sagittaria family, with three white petals.

It is native to Canada and to the United States and also naturalized in Great Britain. It grows in shallow waters along the edges of ponds and streams.

It produces edible potato-like tubers, but these can be dangerous if gathered from polluted water.
