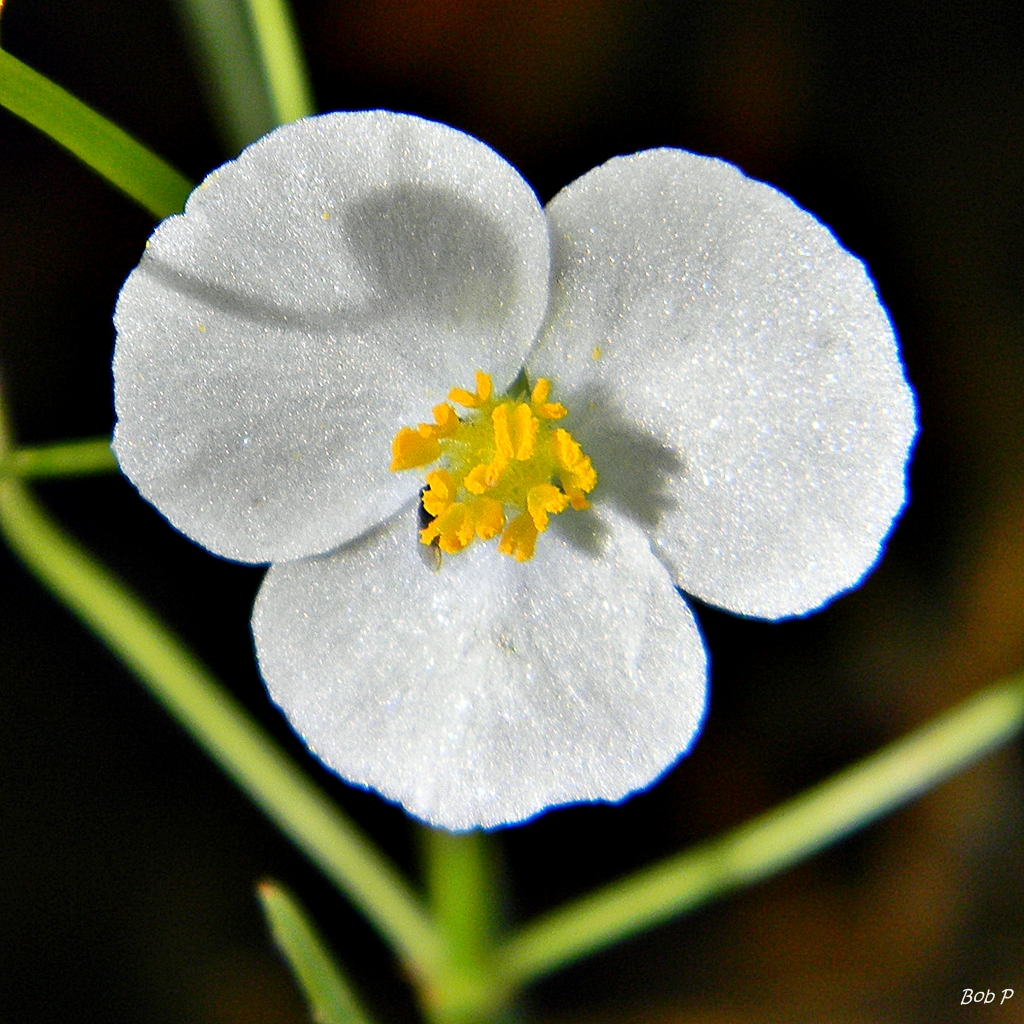

Scientific classification
- Kingdom: Plantae
- Clade: Tracheophytes
- Clade: Angiosperms
- Clade: Monocots
- Order: Alismatales
- Family: Alismataceae
- Genus: Sagittaria
- Species: S. isoetiformis

Binomial name
- Sagittaria isoetiformis J.G. Sm.

= Sagittaria isoetiformis =

Quillwort arrowhead

Species of aquatic plant

Sagittaria isoetiformis, common name quillwort arrowhead, is an aquatic plant species. It is similar to Sagittaria tenuis and often mistaken for it, but S. isoetiformis has flattened leaves rather than leaves round in cross-section. Leaves of both species are usually submerged but sometimes emerging from the water.

The plant is native to Cuba and to the southeastern United States (Florida, Alabama, Mississippi, Georgia, North Carolina and South Carolina).
