= Sagittaria demersa =

Chihuahuan arrowhead

Scientific classification
- Kingdom: Plantae
- Clade: Tracheophytes
- Clade: Angiosperms
- Clade: Monocots
- Order: Alismatales
- Family: Alismataceae
- Genus: Sagittaria
- Species: S. demersa

Binomial name
- Sagittaria demersa J.G.Sm.

Synonyms
- Sagittaria triquetra Sessé & Moc.

Species of aquatic plant

Sagittaria demersa, commonly called Chihuahuan arrowhead, is an annual aquatic plant growing up to 60 centimetres (24 inches) tall. The leaves are flat, very long and narrow, up to 55 cm (22 in) long but rarely more than 7 millimetres (1/4 in) across.

The species is native to north-central Mexico (Chihuahua, Durango. Hidalgo, Aguascalientes, Jalisco and Querétaro) and also from a few sites in the northern part of the US State of New Mexico (Mora and Colfax Counties). The plant occurs mostly submerged in streams and lakes.
