= List of Alismatales of South Africa =

Flowering plants in the order Alismatales recorded from South Africa

The Alismatales (alismatids) are an order of flowering plants including about 4500 species. Plants assigned to this order are mostly tropical or aquatic. Some grow in fresh water, some in marine habitats.

The anthophytes are a grouping of plant taxa bearing flower-like reproductive structures. They were formerly thought to be a clade comprising plants bearing flower-like structures. The group contained the angiosperms - the extant flowering plants, such as roses and grasses - as well as the Gnetales and the extinct Bennettitales.

23,420 species of vascular plant have been recorded in South Africa, making it the sixth most species-rich country in the world and the most species-rich country on the African continent. Of these, 153 species are considered to be threatened. Nine biomes have been described in South Africa: Fynbos, Succulent Karoo, desert, Nama Karoo, grassland, savanna, Albany thickets, the Indian Ocean coastal belt, and forests.

The 2018 South African National Biodiversity Institute's National Biodiversity Assessment plant checklist lists 35,130 taxa in the phyla Anthocerotophyta (hornworts (6)), Anthophyta (flowering plants (33534)), Bryophyta (mosses (685)), Cycadophyta (cycads (42)), Lycopodiophyta (Lycophytes(45)), Marchantiophyta (liverworts (376)), Pinophyta (conifers (33)), and Pteridophyta (cryptogams (408)).

11 families are represented in the literature. Listed taxa include species, subspecies, varieties, and forms as recorded, some of which have subsequently been allocated to other taxa as synonyms, in which cases the accepted taxon is appended to the listing. Multiple entries under alternative names reflect taxonomic revision over time.

== Alismataceae ==
Family Alismataceae, (7 species)

=== Alisma ===
Genus Alisma:

- Alisma plantago-aquatica L. not indigenous, invasive

=== Burnatia ===
Genus Burnatia:

- Burnatia enneandra P.Micheli, indigenous

=== Echinodorus ===
Genus Echinodorus:

- Echinodorus cordifolius (L.) Griseb. not indigenous, invasive
- Echinodorus tenellus (Mart. ex Schult.f.) Buchenau, not indigenous, invasive

=== Limnophyton ===
Genus Limnophyton:

- Limnophyton obtusifolium (L.) Miq. indigenous

=== Sagittaria ===
Genus Sagittaria:

- Sagittaria latifolia Willd. not indigenous, invasive
- Sagittaria platyphylla (Engelm.) J.G.Sm. not indigenous, cultivated. invasive

== Aponogetonaceae ==
Family Aponogetonaceae, (9 species)

=== Aponogeton ===
Genus Aponogeton:

- Aponogeton angustifolius Aiton, endemic
- Aponogeton desertorum Zeyh. ex A.Spreng. indigenous
- Aponogeton distachyos L.f. endemic
- Aponogeton fugax J.C.Manning & Goldblatt, endemic
- Aponogeton junceus Lehm. indigenous
  - Aponogeton junceus Lehm. subsp. natalense (Oliv.) Oberm. accepted as Aponogeton natalensis Oliv.
  - Aponogeton junceus Lehm. subsp. rehmannii (Oliv.) Oberm. accepted as Aponogeton rehmannii Oliv.
- Aponogeton natalensis Oliv. endemic
- Aponogeton ranunculiflorus Jacot Guill. & Marais, indigenous
- Aponogeton rehmannii Oliv. indigenous
- Aponogeton stuhlmannii Engl. indigenous

== Araceae ==
Family Araceae,

=== Arum ===
Genus Arum:

- Arum italicum Mill. not indigenous, cultivated, invasive

=== Colocasia ===
Genus Colocasia:

- Colocasia antiquorum Schott var. esculenta Schott accepted as Colocasia esculenta (L.) Schott, not indigenous, invasive
- Colocasia esculenta (L.) Schott, not indigenous, cultivated, invasive

=== Epipremnum ===
Genus Epipremnum:

- Epipremnum aureum (Linden & Andre) G.S.Bunting, not indigenous, cultivated, invasive

=== Gonatopus ===
Genus Gonatopus:

- Gonatopus angustus N.E.Br. indigenous
- Gonatopus boivinii (Decne.) Engl. indigenous

=== Monstera ===
Genus Monstera:

- Monstera deliciosa Liebm. not indigenous, cultivated, invasive

=== Pistia ===
Genus Pistia:

- Pistia stratiotes L. not indigenous, cultivated, invasive

=== Stylochaeton ===
Genus Stylochaeton:

- Stylochaeton natalensis Schott, indigenous

=== Syngonium ===
Genus Syngonium:

- Syngonium podophyllum Schott, not indigenous, cultivated, invasive

=== Zamioculcas ===
Genus Zamioculcas:

- Zamioculcas zamiifolia (Lodd.) Engl. indigenous

=== Zantedeschia ===
Genus Zantedeschia:

- Zantedeschia aethiopica (L.) Spreng. indigenous
- Zantedeschia albomaculata (Hook.) Baill. indigenous
  - Zantedeschia albomaculata (Hook.) Baill. subsp. albomaculata indigenous
  - Zantedeschia albomaculata (Hook.) Baill. subsp. macrocarpa (Engl.) Letty, indigenous
  - Zantedeschia albomaculata (Hook.) Baill. subsp. valida Letty, accepted as Zantedeschia valida (Letty) Y.Singh
- Zantedeschia elliottiana (W.Watson) Engl. endemic
- Zantedeschia jucunda Letty, endemic
- Zantedeschia odorata P.L.Perry, endemic
- Zantedeschia pentlandii (R.Whyte ex W.Watson) Wittm. endemic
- Zantedeschia rehmannii Engl. indigenous
- Zantedeschia valida (Letty) Y.Singh, endemic

== Cymodoceaceae ==
Family Cymodoceaceae,

=== Halodule ===
Genus Halodule:

- Halodule uninervis (Forssk.) Asch. indigenous

=== Thalassodendron ===
Genus Thalassodendron:

- Thalassodendron ciliatum (Forssk.) Hartog, indigenous

== Hydrocharitaceae ==
Family Hydrocharitaceae,

=== Egeria ===
Genus Egeria:

- Egeria densa Planch. not indigenous, invasive

=== Elodea ===
Genus Elodea:

- Elodea canadensis Michx. not indigenous, invasive

=== Halophila ===
Genus Halophila:

- Halophila ovalis (R.Br.) Hook.f.indigenous
- Halophila ovalis (R.Br.) Hook.f. subsp. ovalis indigenous

=== Hydrilla ===
Genus Hydrilla:

- Hydrilla verticillata (L.f.) Royle, not indigenous, invasive

=== Lagarosiphon ===
Genus Lagarosiphon:

- Lagarosiphon cordofanus Casp. indigenous
- Lagarosiphon major (Ridl.) Moss ex Wager, indigenous
- Lagarosiphon muscoides Harv. indigenous
- Lagarosiphon verticillifolius Oberm. indigenous

=== Najas ===
Genus Najas:

- Najas graminea Delile, indigenous
- Najas graminea Delile, var. graminea, indigenous
- Najas horrida A.Braun ex Rendle, indigenous
- Najas marina L. ex Magnus, indigenous
- Najas marina L. ex Magnus subsp. armata (H.Lindb.) Horn, indigenous
- Najas setacea (A.Br.) Rendle, indigenous

=== Ottelia ===
Genus Ottelia:

- Ottelia exserta (Ridl.) Dandy, indigenous
- Ottelia ulvifolia (Planch.) Walp. indigenous
- Ottelia vernayi Bremek. & Oberm. accepted as Ottelia ulvifolia (Planch.) Walp.

=== Vallisneria ===
Genus Vallisneria:

- Vallisneria aethiopica Fenzl, accepted as Vallisneria spiralis L.
- Vallisneria spiralis L., indigenous

== Juncaginaceae ==
Family Juncaginaceae,

=== Triglochin ===
Genus Triglochin:

- Triglochin buchenaui Kocke, Mering, Kadereit, indigenous
- Triglochin bulbosa L. indigenous
  - Triglochin bulbosa L. subsp. bulbosa, endemic
  - Triglochin bulbosa L. subsp. calcicola Mering, Kocke & Kadereit, indigenous
  - Triglochin bulbosa L. subsp. quarcicola Mering, Kocke & Kadereit, endemic
  - Triglochin bulbosa L. subsp. tenuifolia (Adamson) Horn, endemic
- Triglochin elongata Buchenau accepted as Triglochin bulbosa L.
- Triglochin milnei Horn, indigenous
- Triglochin striata Ruiz & Pav. indigenous

== Lemnaceae ==
Family Lemnaceae,

=== Lemna ===
Genus Lemna:

- Lemna aequinoctialis Welw. indigenous
- Lemna gibba L. indigenous
- Lemna minor L. indigenous

=== Spirodela ===
Genus Spirodela:

- Spirodela polyrhiza (L.) Schleid. indigenous
- Spirodela punctata (G.Mey.) C.H.Thomps. indigenous

=== Wolffia ===
Genus Wolffia:

- Wolffia arrhiza (L.) Horkel ex Wimm. indigenous
- Wolffia globosa (Roxb.) Hartog & Plas, indigenous

=== Wolffiella ===
Genus Wolffiella:

- Wolffiella denticulata (Hegelm.) Hegelm. endemic
- Wolffiella welwitschii (Hegelm.) Monod, indigenous

== Limnocharitaceae ==
Family Limnocharitaceae,

=== Hydrocleys ===
Genus Hydrocleys:

- Hydrocleys nymphoides (Willd.) Buchenau, not indigenous, invasive

=== Tenagocharis ===
Genus Tenagocharis:

- Tenagocharis latifolia (D.Don) Buchenau, accepted as Butomopsis latifolia (D.Don) Kunth

== Potamogetonaceae ==
Family Potamogetonaceae,

=== Althenia ===
Genus Althenia:

- Althenia filiformis F.Petit, indigenous

=== Potamogeton ===
Genus Potamogeton:

- Potamogeton crispus L. indigenous
- Potamogeton nodosus Poir. indigenous
- Potamogeton octandrus Poir. indigenous
- Potamogeton pectinatus L. indigenous
- Potamogeton pusillus L. indigenous
- Potamogeton richardii Solms, indigenous
- Potamogeton schweinfurthii A.Benn. indigenous
- Potamogeton subjavanicus Hagstr. accepted as Potamogeton pusillus L.
- Potamogeton thunbergii Cham. & Schltdl. accepted as Potamogeton nodosus Poir. indigenous
- Potamogeton trichoides Cham. & Schltdl. indigenous
- Potamogeton venosus A.Benn. accepted as Potamogeton schweinfurthii A.Benn.

=== Pseudoalthenia ===
Genus Pseudoalthenia:

- Pseudoalthenia aschersoniana (Graebn.) Hartog, endemic

=== Zannichellia ===
Genus Zannichellia:

- Zannichellia palustris L. indigenous

== Ruppiaceae ==
Family Ruppiaceae,

=== Ruppia ===
Genus Ruppia:

- Ruppia cirrhosa (Petagna) Grande, indigenous
- Ruppia maritima L. indigenous

== Zosteraceae ==
Family Zosteraceae,

=== Nanozostera ===
Genus Nanozostera:

- Nanozostera capensis (Setch.) Toml. & Posl. accepted as Zostera capensis Setch.

=== Zostera ===
Genus Zostera:

- Zostera capensis Setch. indigenous
