= Zantedeschi =

Zantedeschi is a surname of Italian origin. Notable people with the surname include:

- Aurora Zantedeschi (born 2000), Italian tennis player
- Francesco Zantedeschi (1797–1873), Italian Catholic priest and physicist
- Giovanni Zantedeschi (1773–1846), Italian medical doctor and botanist
