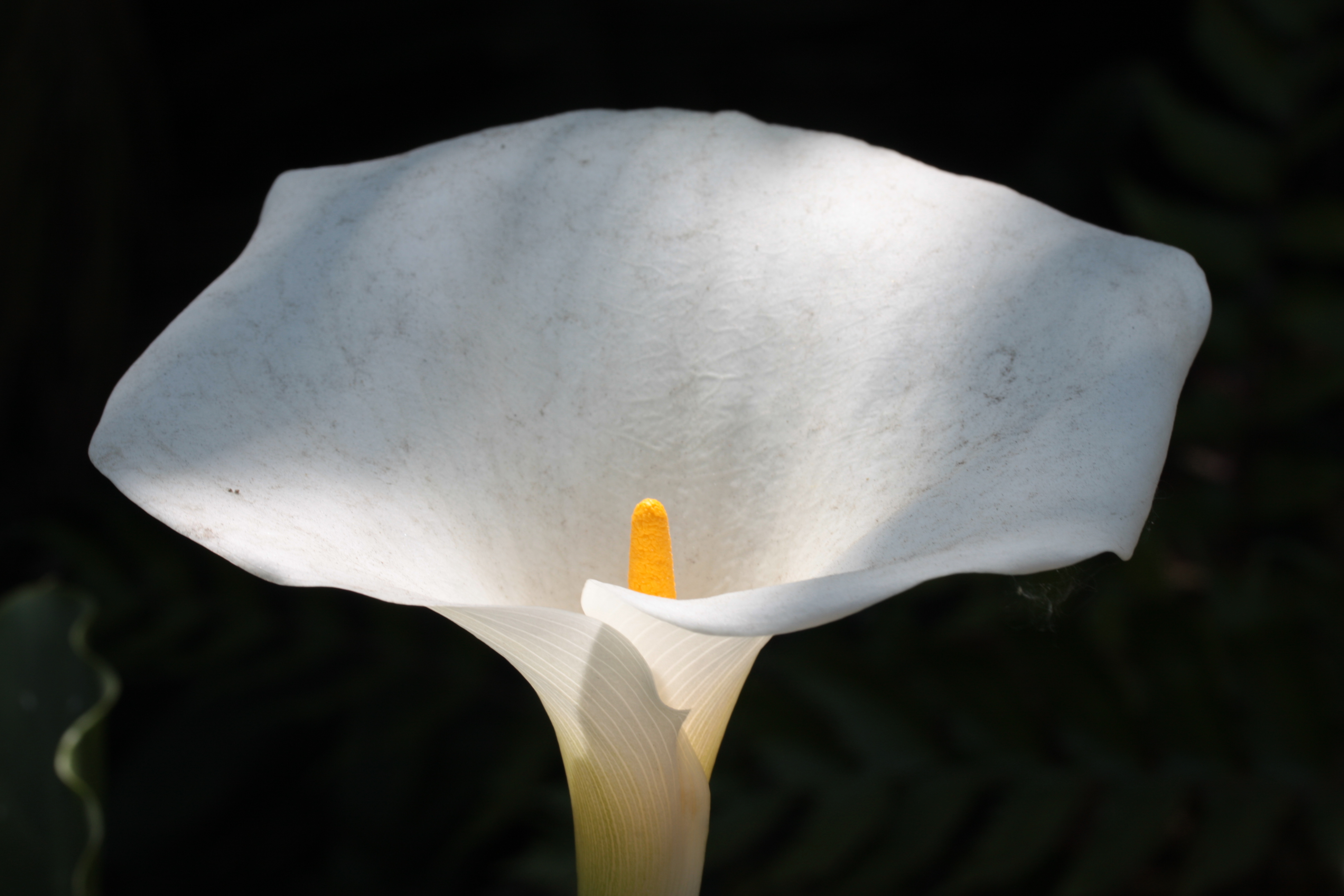

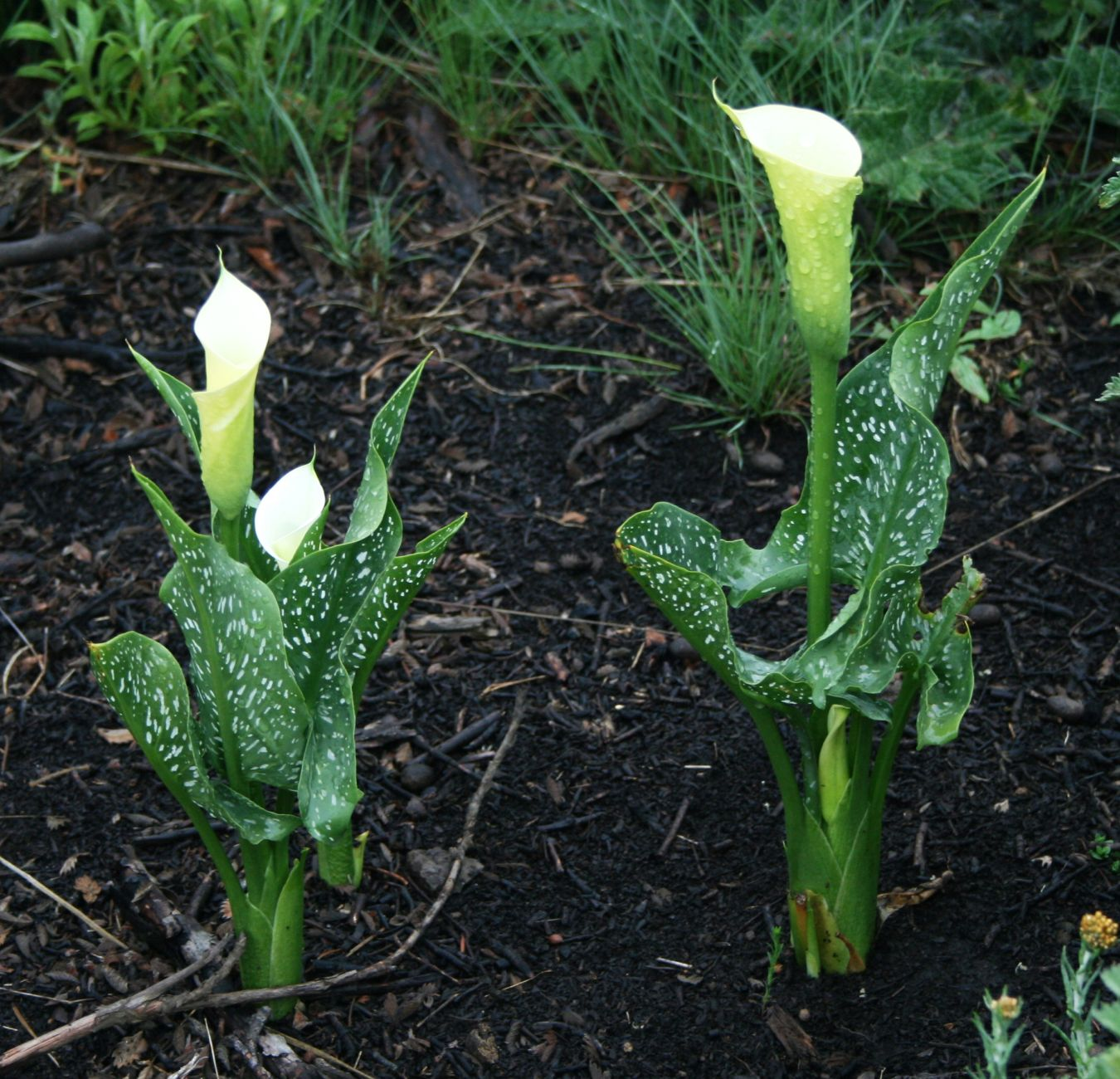

Conservation status
- Least Concern (IUCN 3.1)

Scientific classification
- Kingdom: Plantae
- Clade: Tracheophytes
- Clade: Angiosperms
- Clade: Monocots
- Order: Alismatales
- Family: Araceae
- Genus: Zantedeschia
- Species: Z. albomaculata

Binomial name
- Zantedeschia albomaculata (Hook.) Baill.

= Zantedeschia albomaculata =

Species of flowering plant

Zantedeschia albomaculata, commonly called the spotted calla lily (although Calla is a genus unto itself) or the white spotted arum, is a species of flowering plant in the arum family, Araceae. Its leaves are somewhat smaller, thinner and slightly more pointed than the larger Zantedeschia aethiopica—also commonly called the "calla lily"—and display attractive white speckling on their faces. The plant spreads laterally underground by way of a rhizome or tuber, with nodes (or "eyes") that sprout and send-up new shoots. Its inflorescence is typical of the Araceae family, featuring a white, funnel-shaped spathe (or bract) with a yellowish spadix in the center.

In modern cultivation, numerous color variations have been developed, ranging from white with splashes of other colors to bright yellow through to deep purple, almost black, spathes. Various forms are commonly sold in stores and garden centers, both as potted plants or as bare-root rhizomes to be planted outdoors.
