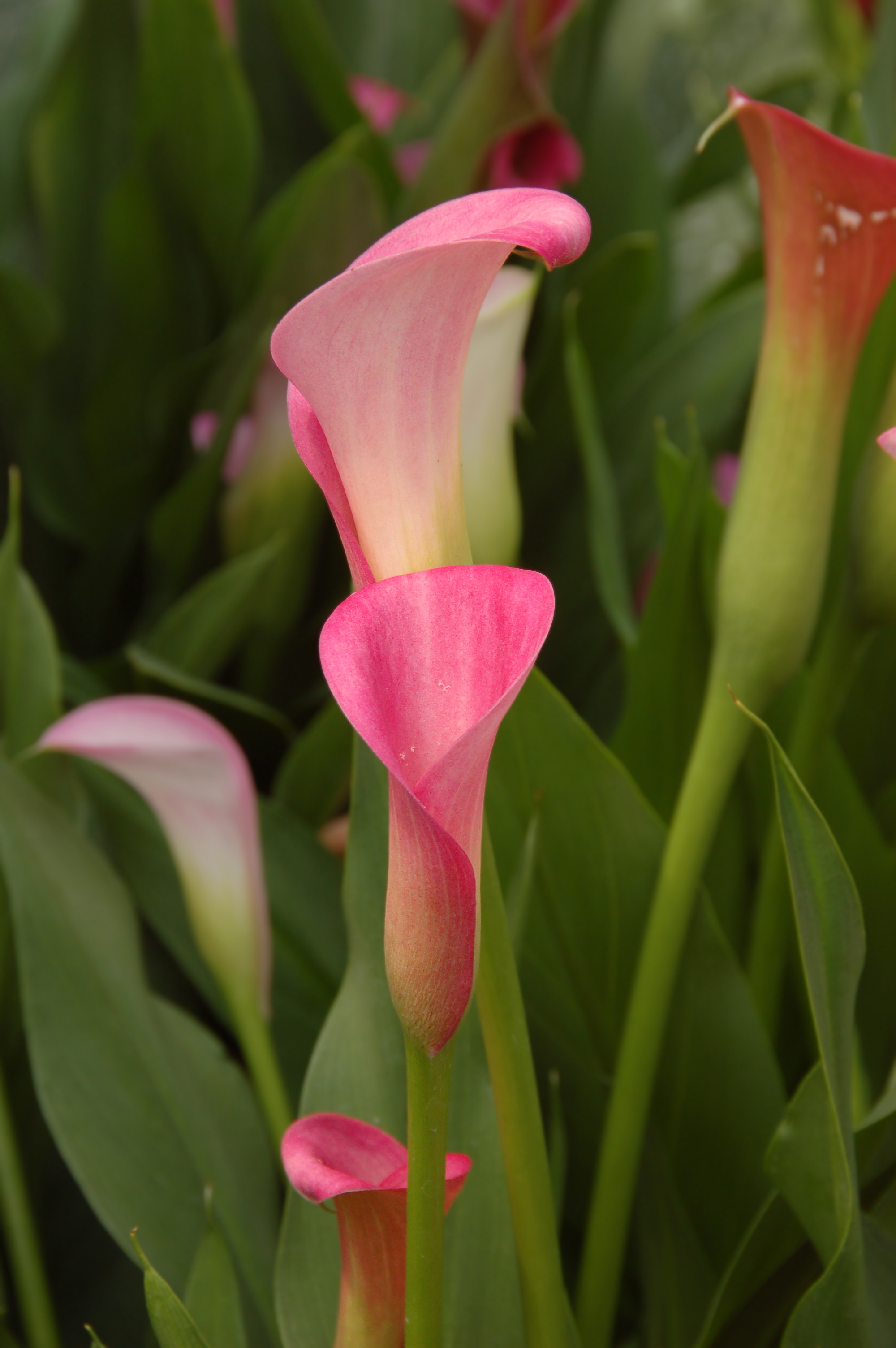

Scientific classification
- Kingdom: Plantae
- Clade: Embryophytes
- Clade: Tracheophytes
- Clade: Spermatophytes
- Clade: Angiosperms
- Clade: Monocots
- Order: Alismatales
- Family: Araceae
- Genus: Zantedeschia
- Species: Z. rehmannii

Binomial name
- Zantedeschia rehmannii Engl.

Synonyms
- Richardia rehmannii (Engl.) N.E.Br. ex Krelage; Richardia lehmannii N.E.Br. ex Krelage; Zantedeschia stehmannii Sprenger

= Zantedeschia rehmannii =

Species of flowering plant

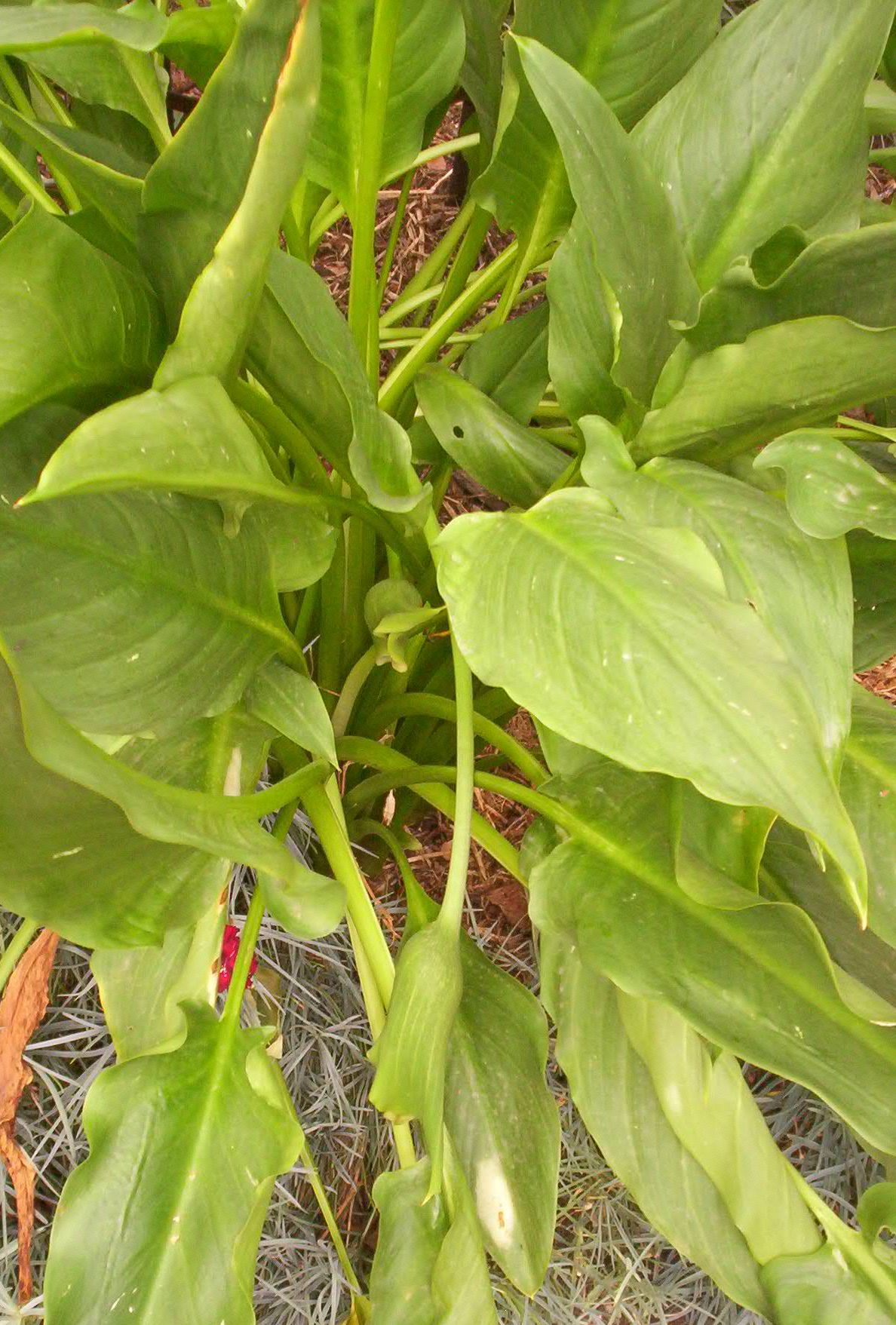
Old inflorescence (green) and leaves

Zantedeschia rehmannii, the pink arum lily, pink calla, or red calla lily, is a herbaceous ornamental plant in the family Araceae. It (or its cultivar(s)) is a recipient of the Royal Horticultural Society's Award of Garden Merit.

== Description ==
The spathe on this summer flowering Zantedeschia is mauve to rose-purple with paler margins, enclosing a yellow spadix. Its green unmarked leaves are semi erect and not arrow shaped as in other species.

It grows to 40 cm (15 in) tall and 30 cm (12 in) wide. The plant is slightly frost hardy, preferring a well composted soil in an area protected from strong winds and in part shade.
