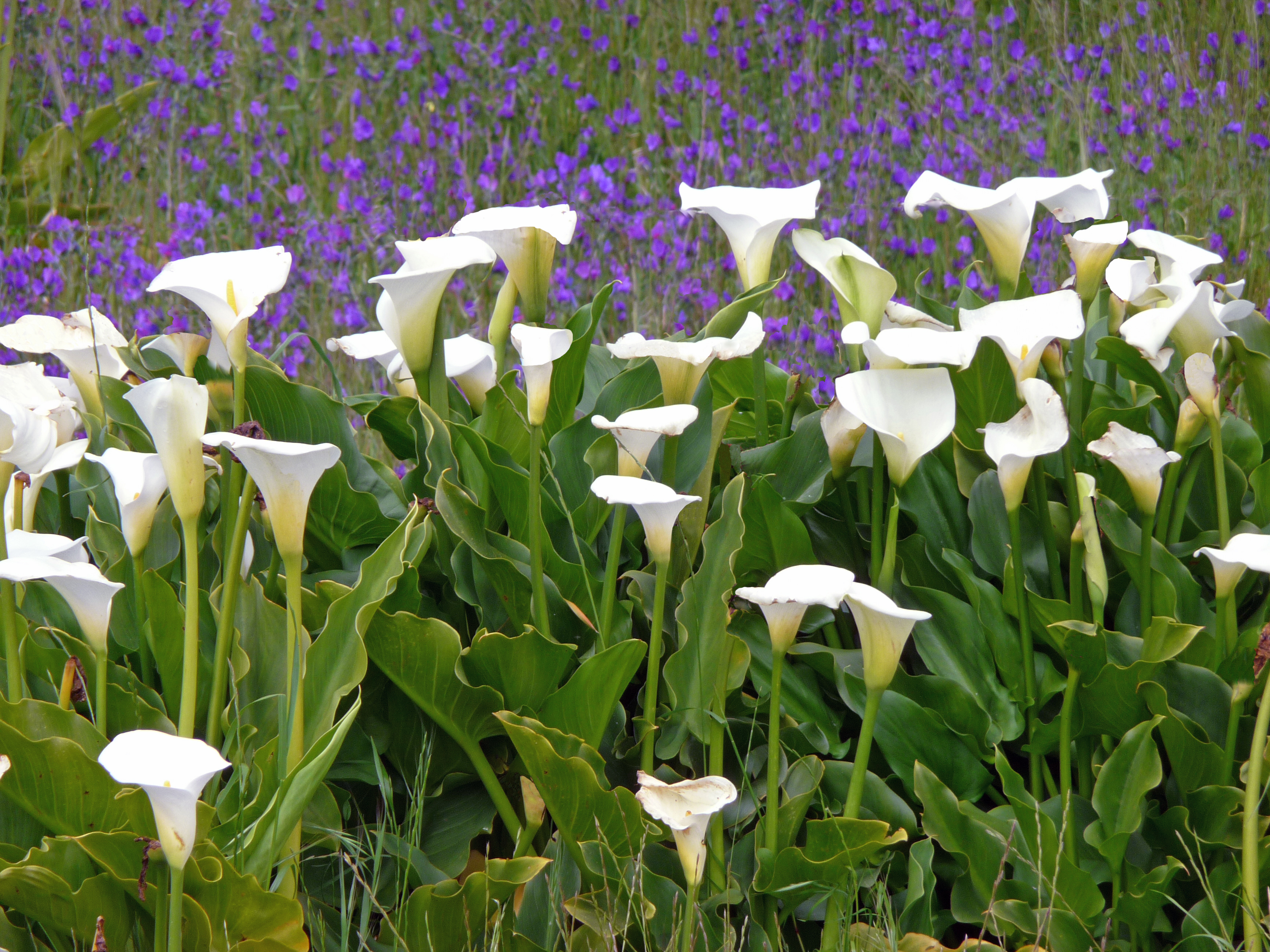
- Zantedeschia aethiopica

Scientific classification
- Kingdom: Plantae
- Clade: Tracheophytes
- Clade: Angiosperms
- Clade: Monocots
- Order: Alismatales
- Family: Araceae
- Subfamily: Aroideae
- Tribe: Zantedeschieae
- Genus: Zantedeschia; Spreng. Syst. Veg., ed. 16. 3: 765 (1826), nom. cons.

Type species
- Calla aethiopica L.

Synonyms
- Arodes Heist. ex Kuntze; Colocasia Link; Houttinia Neck.; Otosma Raf.; Pseudohomalomena A.D.Hawkes; Richardia Kunth

= Zantedeschia =

Genus of flowering plants in the arum family

Zantedeschia (/ˌzæntɪˈdɛskiə/) is a genus of eight species of herbaceous, perennial, flowering plants in the aroid family, Araceae, native to southern Africa (from South Africa northeast to Malawi). The genus has been introduced, in some form, on every continent other than Antarctica.

Common names include arum lily for Z. aethiopica, calla and calla lily for Z. elliottiana and Z. rehmannii. However, members of this genus are not true lilies (which belong to the family Liliaceae), and the genera Arum and Calla, although related, are distinct from Zantedeschia, despite visual similarities. The colourful flowers and leaves, of both species and cultivars, are greatly valued and commonly grown as ornamental and garden plants.

== Etymology ==
The name of the genus was given as a tribute to Italian botanist Giovanni Zantedeschi (1773–1846) by the German botanist Kurt Sprengel (1766–1833).

== Description ==
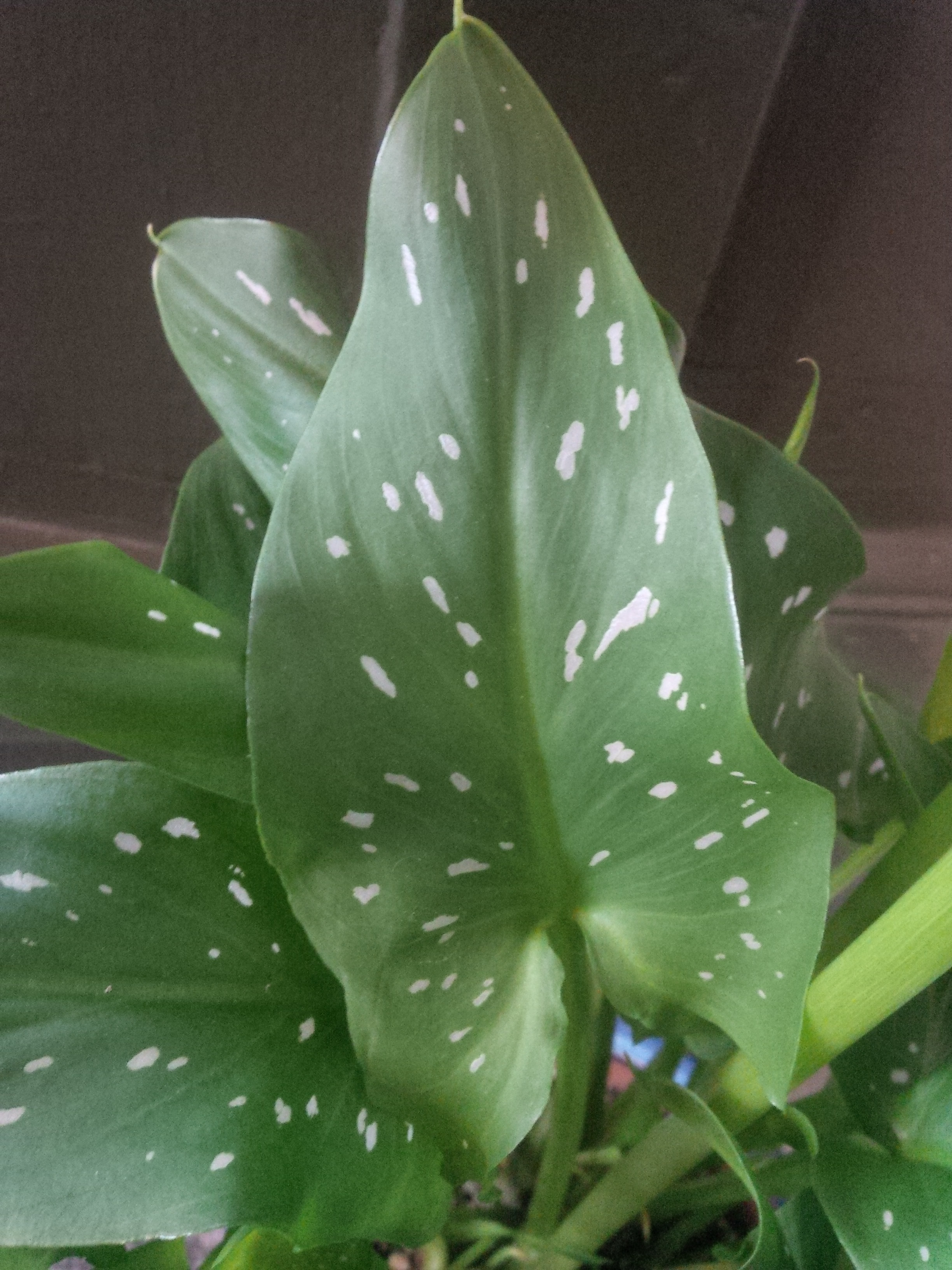
Hastate leaf shape with maculation

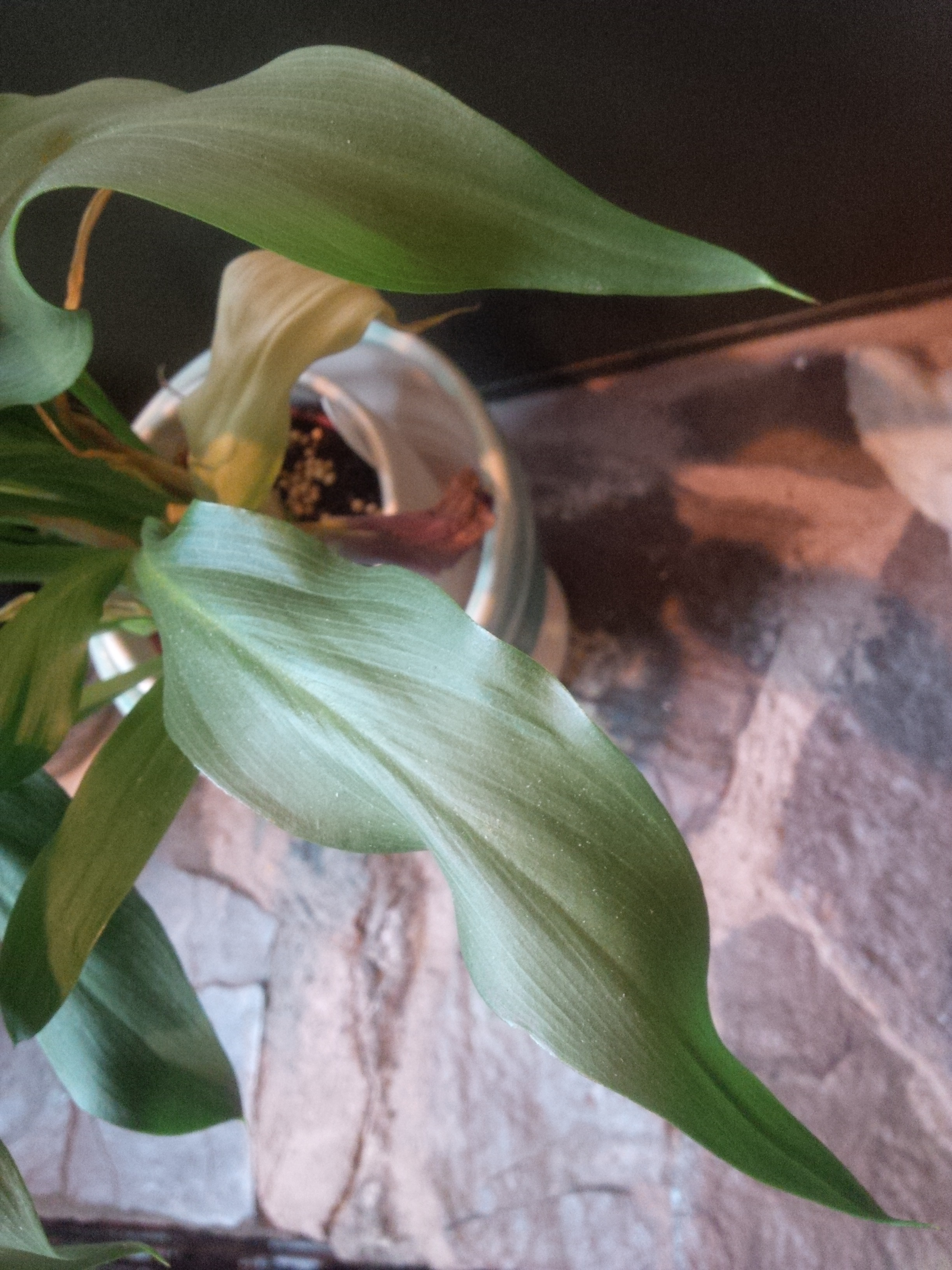
Lanceolate leaf shape with undulate form

Zantedeschia species are rhizomatous, herbaceous, perennial plants with some species, e.g., Zantedeschia aethiopica, growing to 1.2 m (3 ft 11 in) tall, while Zantedeschia rehmannii does not exceed 60 cm (24 in) in height, growing in clumps or clusters.
Roots: Contractile, emerging from the top of the tubers in Group II.
Stem: The underground portion is variously described as a thick underground stem, i.e., a rhizome or tuber. While the literature is confusing as to the exact terminology, generally the Zantedeschia aethiopica-Zantedeschia odorata group (Group I) is considered to have rhizomes and the remaining species tubers. The rhizomes are fleshy and branched.

Leaves: Petioles are long, spongy, sheathed at the bases, and of varying lengths, from 15 cm (Zantedeschia rehmannii) to 1.5 m (Zantedeschia aethiopica). The lamina is simple, elongated, and coriaceous with a variety of shapes, including triangular, oval (ovate), with or without a point (elliptic), heart-shaped (cordate), spear-shaped (hastate), lance-shaped (lanceolate), oblong, or circular (orbicular). 15–60 cm in length, 5–25 cm in width. The leaves are dark green in colour, feather-veined (pinnate), and may be erect or spreading with undulate margins. Some species exhibit transparent flecking (maculation), and are therefore described as maculate, while others are immaculate. (see Table I, also New Zealand Calla Council Leaf Shape Images) The leaves contain hydathodes that result in guttation.

Table I: Descriptive features of the foliage of Zantedeschia species
| Species | Leaf shape | Leaf size | Maculation |
|---|---|---|---|
| Z. aethiopica | Ovate-cordate or hastate | 15–45×10–25 cm | rare |
| Z. odorata | Ovate to cordate | | none |
| Z. albomaculata subsp. albomaculata | Oblong-hastate | 20–50×6–8 cm | rare |
| Z. albomaculata subsp. macrocarpa | Triangular-hastate | 18–20×5–7 cm | sparse |
| Z. valida | Ovate to cordate to ovate-orbicular-cordate | | none |
| Z. elliottiana | Orbicular-ovate | 22×18 cm | present |
| Z. jucunda | Triangular-hastate | | dense |
| Z. pentlandii | Oblong-elliptic to oblong-lanceolate | | seldom |
| Z. rehmannii | Lanceolate | 20–30×3 cm | none |

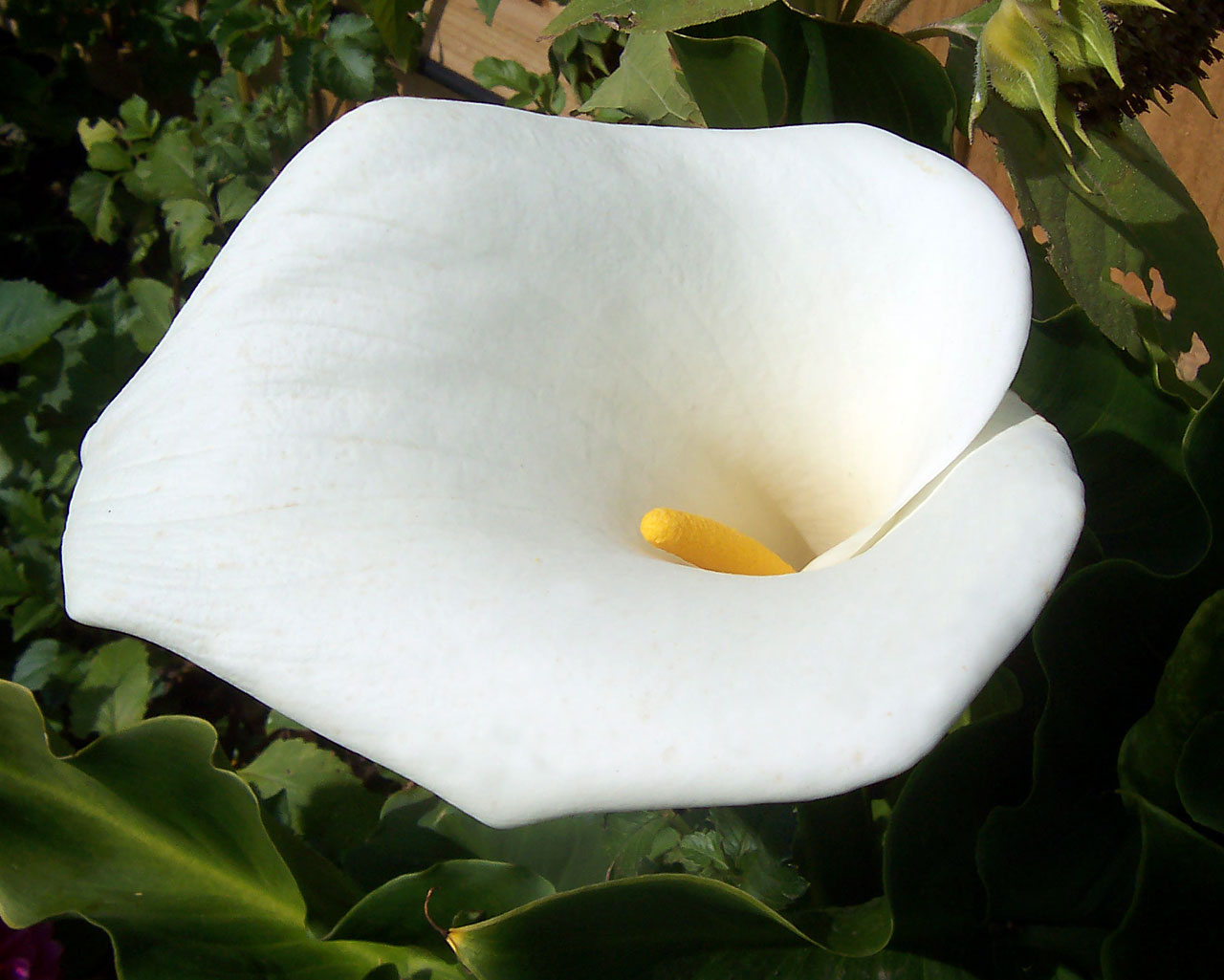
Inflorescence of Zantedeschia aethiopica, showing the white spathe surrounding the central, yellow spadix

Inflorescence: Takes the form of a solitary pseudanthium (false flower), with a showy white or yellow spathe (a specialised petal like bract) shaped like a funnel with a yellow, central, finger-like spadix, which carries the true flowers. Both spathe and spadix are carried on or above the leaves on the fleshy flower stem. The shape of the spathe whose overlapping margins form the tubes varies from trumpet shaped (Z. pentlandii) to a tight tube with a tapering tip (Z. rehmannii). The spathe is initially green, but as it unfolds becomes coloured. This may be white as in Z. aethiopica, but other species include yellow and pink. Cultivars have a wide variety of other spathe colours including orange and purple. Inside the spathe, the throat may be darkly coloured. The spathe acts to attract pollinators.
Flowers: Zantedeschia is monoecious, in which separate male (staminate) and female (pistillate) flowers ("imperfect" or "unisexual" flowers) are carried on the spadix. The flowers are small and non-blooming without a perianth. The male flowers contain two to three stamens fused to form a synandrium, and the female flowers have a single, compound pistil with three fused carpels and three locules.

Table II: Descriptive features of the inflorescences of Zantedeschia species
| Species | Spathe colour | Flowering period | Throat darkened |
|---|---|---|---|
| Z. aethiopica | white-pink | late winter – late spring | No |
| Z. odorata | white | late winter - late spring | No |
| Z. albomaculata subsp. albomaculata | white-pale yellow-coral pink | late winter | Yes |
| Z. albomaculata subsp. macrocarpa | yellow | summer | Yes |
| Z. valida | cream | summer | Yes |
| Z. elliottiana | gold-yellow | summer | Yes |
| Z. jucunda | gold-yellow | summer | Yes |
| Z. pentlandii | lemon-chrome yellow | summer | Yes |
| Z. rehmannii | white-pink-maroon | summer | No |

Fruit: Beaked orange or red berries.

== Taxonomy ==
Zantedeschia is the sole genus in the tribe Zantedeschieae in a 1997 classification of the Araceae.

=== Species ===
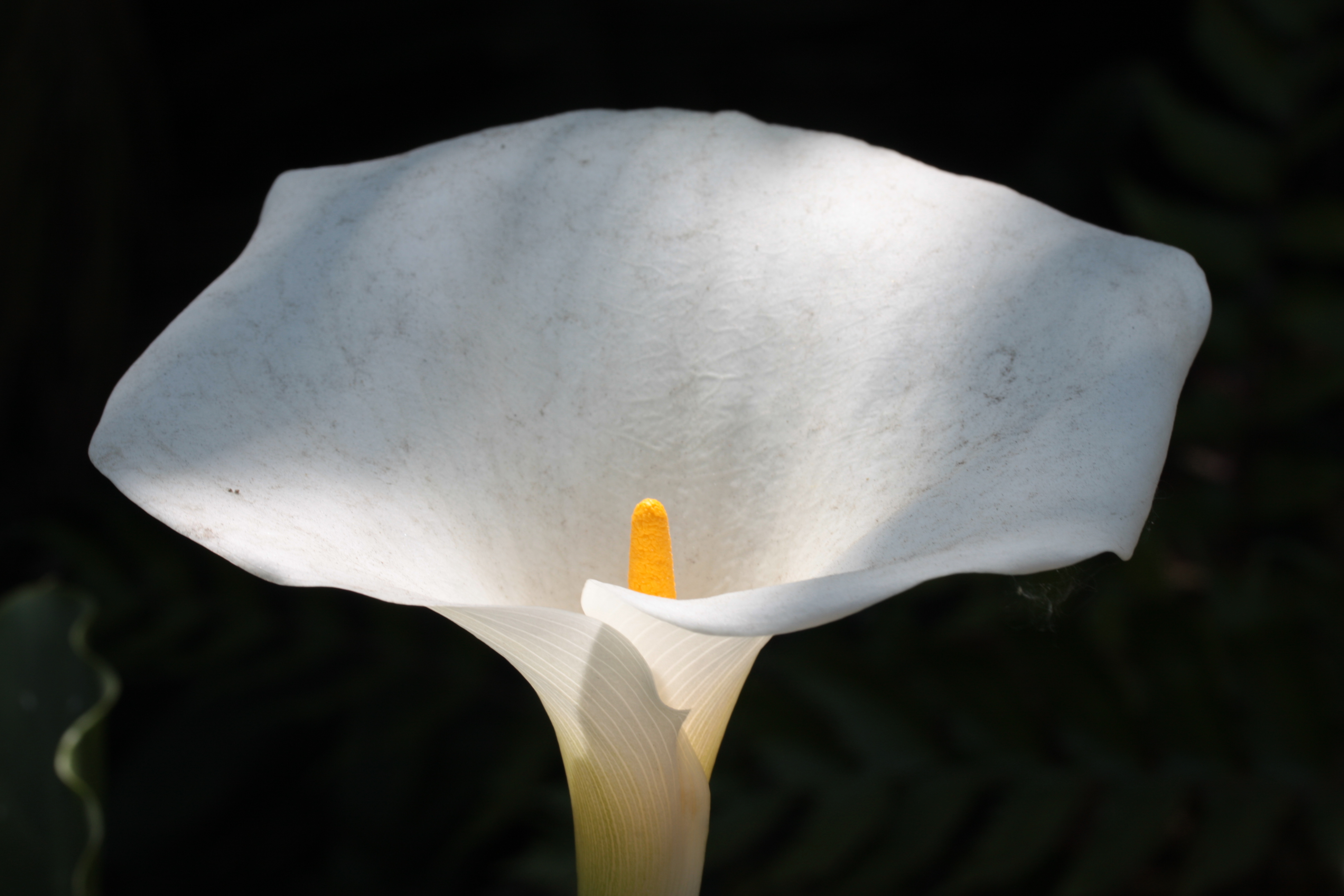
Zantedeschia albomaculata

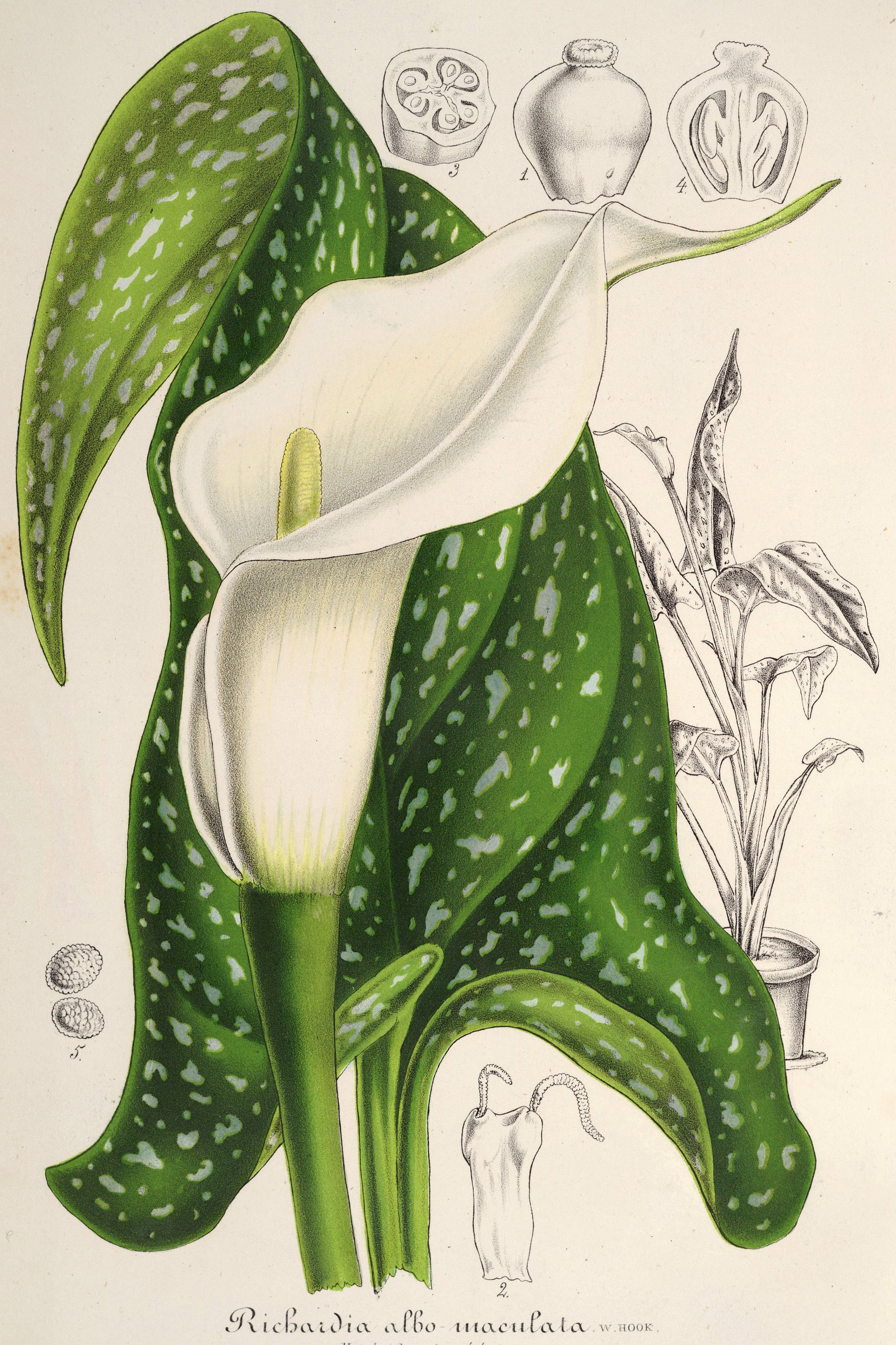
Zantedeschia albomaculata, from L'Illustration Horticole vol. 7 (1860), by Charles Antoine Lemaire (1801–1871), and Ambroise Verschaffelt (1825–1886)

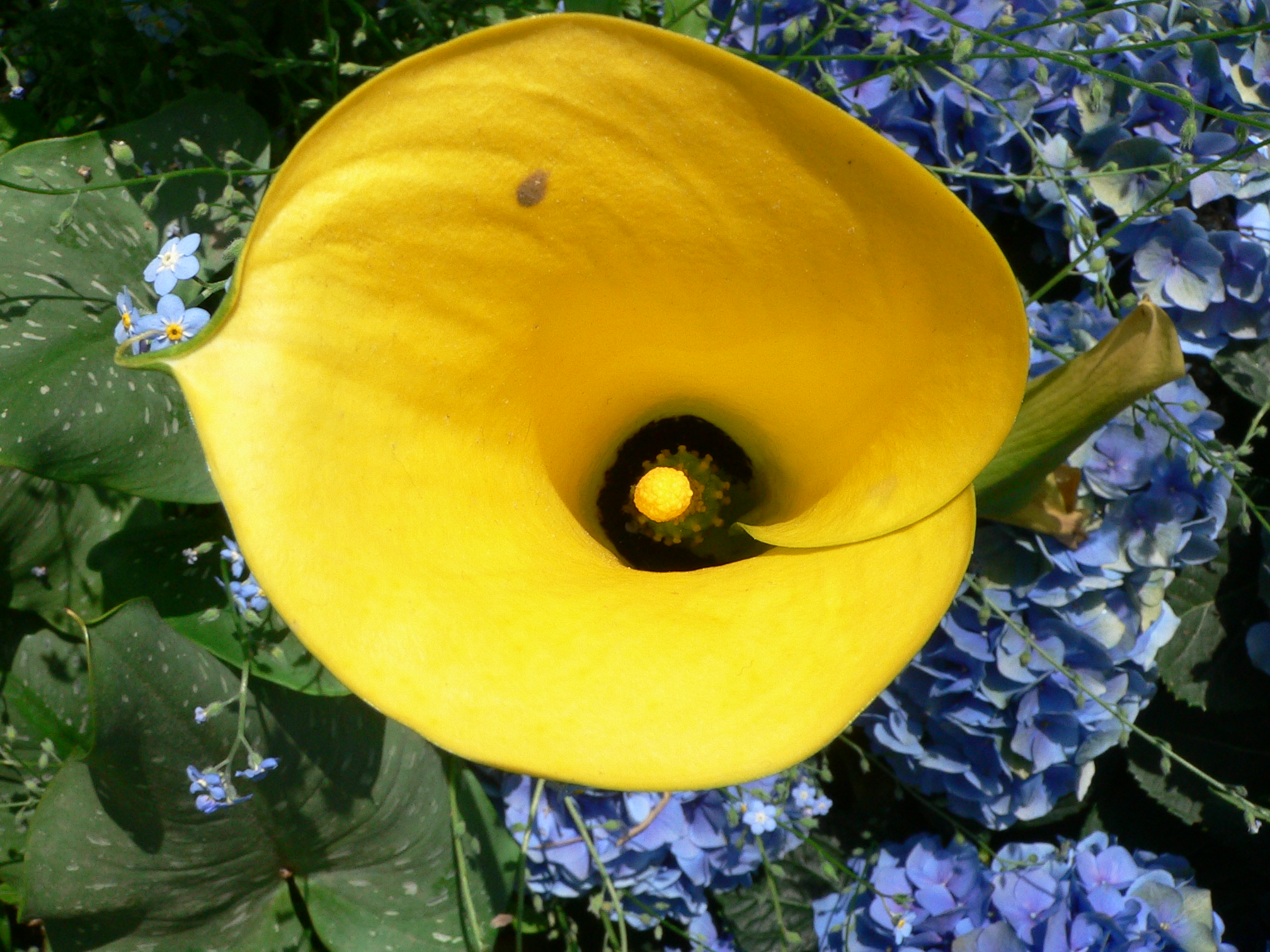
Zantedeschia elliottiana

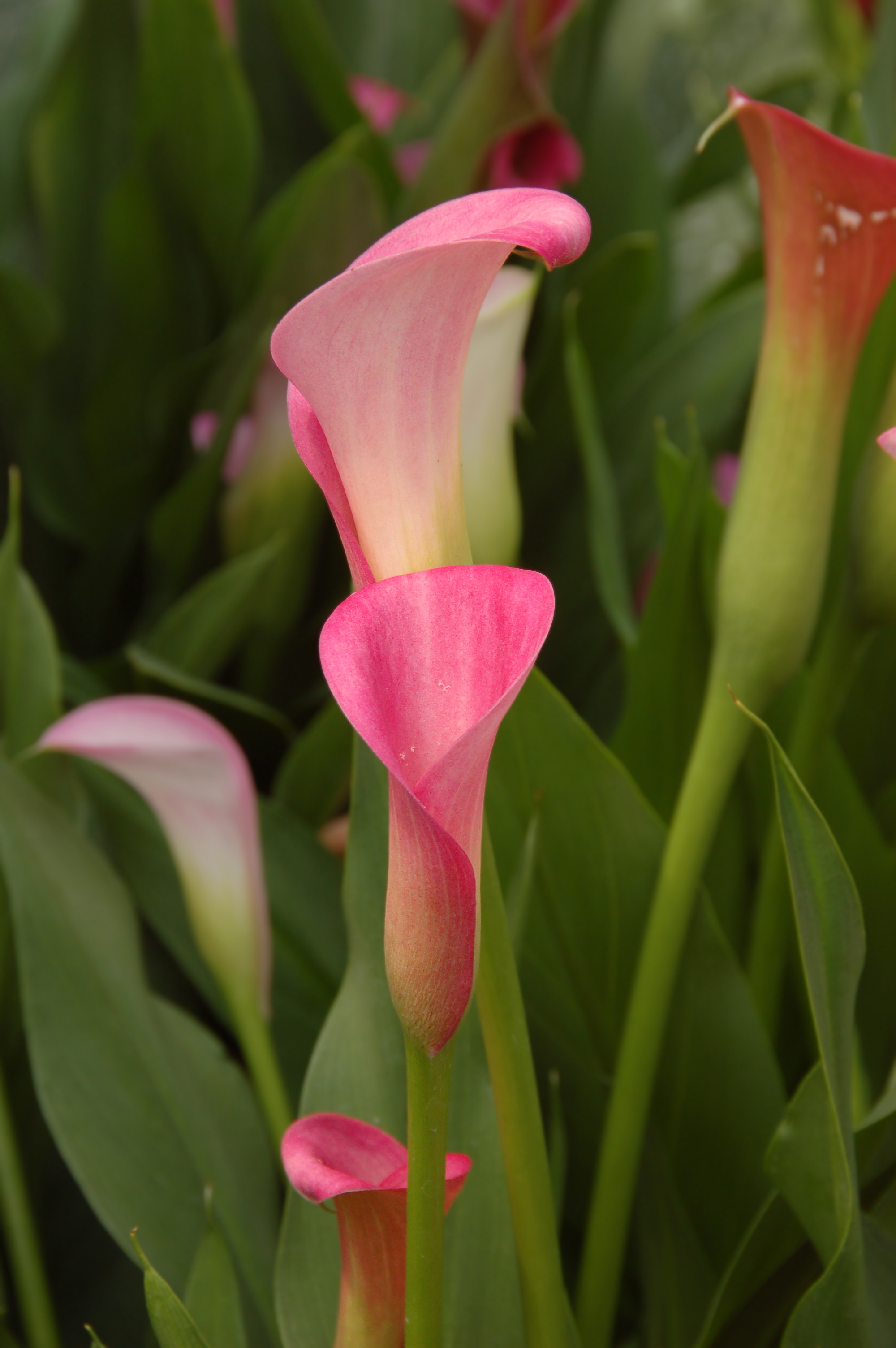
Zantedeschia rehmannii

Eight species are currently recognized:

- Zantedeschia aethiopica (L.) Spreng. – giant white arum lily or common arum lily – South Africa, Eswatini, Lesotho
- Zantedeschia albomaculata (Hook.) Baill. – spotted arum lily – widespread from South Africa north to Nigeria and Tanzania
- Zantedeschia elliottiana (W.Watson) Engl. – yellow or golden arum lily – Mpumalanga Province of South Africa
- Zantedeschia jucunda Letty – Leolo Mountains of northern South Africa
- Zantedeschia odorata P.L.Perry – Western Cape Province
- Zantedeschia pentlandii (R.Whyte ex W.Watson) Wittm. – Mpumalanga Province of South Africa
- Zantedeschia rehmannii Engl. – pink arum lily – South Africa, Eswatini, Mozambique
- Zantedeschia valida (Letty) Y.Singh – KwaZulu-Natal Province of South Africa

== Distribution and habitat ==
All species are endemic to central and southern Africa, from Nigeria to Tanzania and South Africa. Z. aethiopica grows naturally in marshy areas and is only deciduous when water becomes scarce. It grows continuously when watered and fed regularly and can survive periods of minor frosts. Z. aethiopica is a very strong and sturdy plant, being able to grow in many soils and habitats, multiplying by rhizome-offsets; it is naturalised and regarded as a weed throughout much of the world. Z. odorata is a rare species, resembling Z. aethiopica, but deciduous and smelling like freesia, endemic to a few localities in South Africa. Z. albomaculata is a widespread and variable species, growing from South Africa north to Kenya, varying in shades of white to cream and pink to orange-shades. Z. jucunda and Z. pentlandii are rare species with large yellow showy flowers. Z. rehmannii is a pink-flowered species with sword shaped leaves. Z. elliotiana is known from horticultural sources only and is probably of hybrid origin.

=== Introduction ===
Zantedeschia was introduced to Europe in the 17th century as Z. aethiopica, and is now widely naturalised in Europe, North America, Central America, South America, Oceania, and Australasia. In many places it is considered a dangerous invasive species that displaces native vegetation. In the South-West of Western Australia, Z. aethiopica was introduced for horticulture, but has become a widespread and conspicuous weed of watercourses, heath, and wet pastures to the extent that it has been declared a pest in Western Australia and landowners must control it and attempts to sell plants must be reported. Zantedeschia in North America is primarily grown as ornamental cultivars in home gardens.

=== Habitat ===
Z. aethiopica grows naturally in marshy areas and is only deciduous when water becomes scarce. It grows continuously when watered and fed regularly and can survive periods of minor frosts. Z. aethiopica is a very strong and sturdy plant, being able to grow in many soils and habitats, multiplying by rhizome-offsets.

== Cultivation ==
All Zantedeschia produce large, showy flowers spathes and are often grown both as ornamental plants and for cut flowers. Zantedeschia are relatively hardy plants, but some are more winter-hardy than others. In this regard there may be considered two groups, a hardy outdoor group with large white flowers (arum lilies) and less hardy group with white-spotted leaves and flowers in many colours (calla lilies), such as yellow, orange, pink and purple.

=== Hardy forms (arum lilies) ===
These include Zantedeschia aethiopica and Zantedeschia pentlandii and their cultivars. Zantedeschia aethiopica and some of its relatives can survive at minimum winter temperatures below -23 °C (USDA Zone 6) and many others can be grown in even warmer areas where all the ground does not freeze (USDA Zone 7). Z. pentlandii hybrids include 'Millennium Gold'.

=== Tender forms (calla lilies) ===
The more tender specimens are mainly cultivars (hybrids) of Zantedeschia elliotiana and Zantedeschia rehmannii (referred to as elliotiana or rehmannii cultivars or hybrids, or as e.g. Z. × rehmanii), but also Zantedeschia albomaculata and Zantedeschia jucunda. These less hardy forms can only survive winter temperatures to −12 °C (Zones 8). This plant must be grown as tender bulbs or houseplants in cooler areas. Species and hybrids between Z. elliotiana, Z. jucunda, Z. pentlandii and Z. rehmannii appear to have an optimum temperature for growth near 25 °C (77 °F), with growth being suppressed once daily average temperatures persist at 28 °C (82 °F).

Z. rehmannii hybrids include 'Amethyst', 'Crystal Blush' and 'Neon Amour', while an example of a Z. elliotiana × Z. rehmannii hybrid would be 'Blaze'. Z. elliotiana × Z. maculata hybrids include 'Lemon Drop'. Z. elliotiana hybrids include 'Solar Flare'.

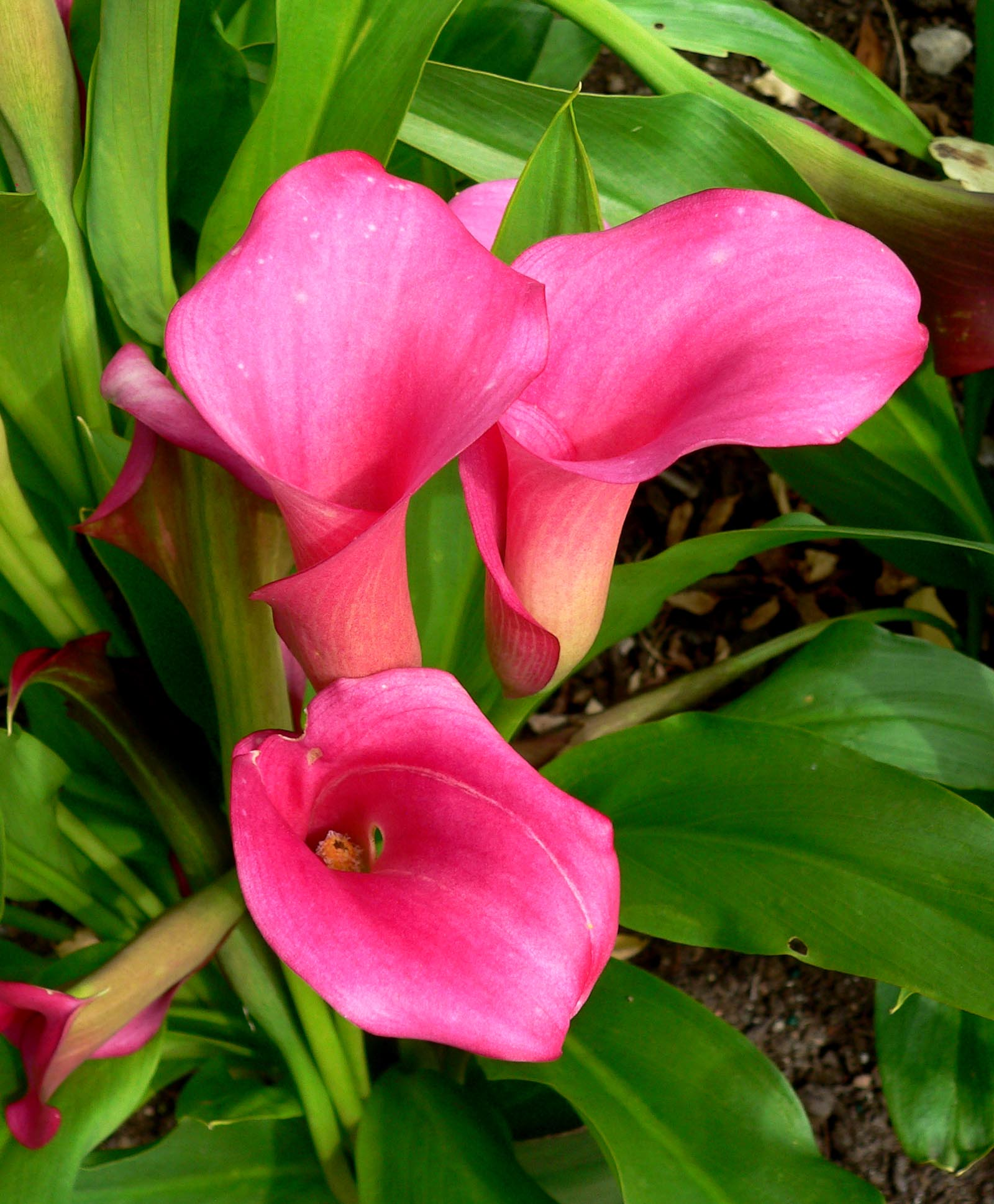
Zantedeschia × rehmanii 'Neon Amour'

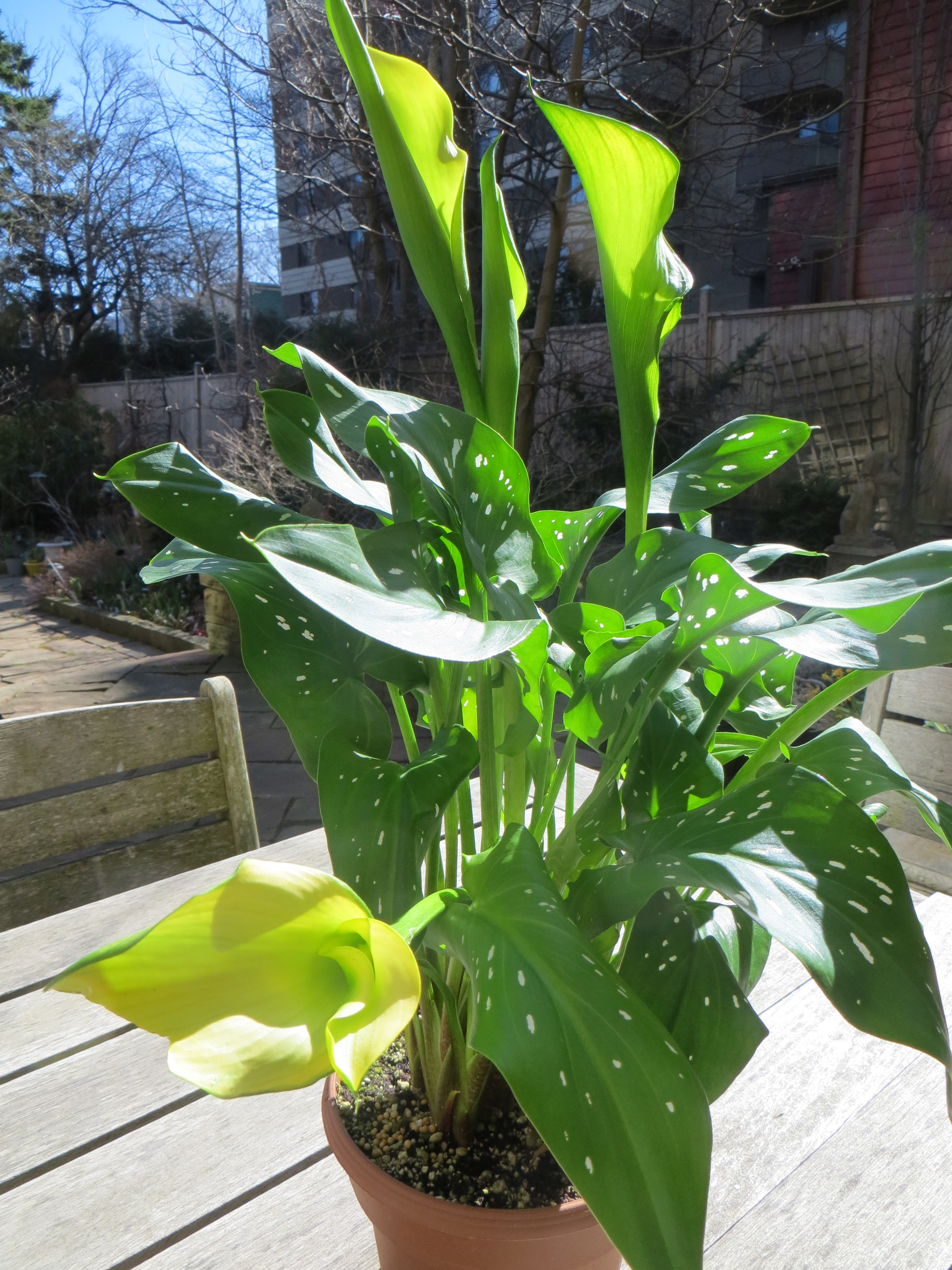
Zantedeschia elliotiana × maculata 'Lemon Drop'

=== Seasonal grouping ===
Other classifications consider two groups based on their seasonal habits. Zantedeschia aethiopica and Zantedeschia odorata form one group (Group I) typified by retaining their leaves in winter, and flowering from late winter to late spring, while the remaining species (Group II) are in leaf from spring to late autumn shedding their leaves in winter (deciduous) and flower during the summer. Zantedeschia aethiopica may retain its leaves all year round (evergreen), otherwise from autumn to late summer, while Zantedeschia odorata retains its leaves from late winter to late spring. The two groups also vary according to the arrangement of the male and female organs. In the first group they are arranged together in the lower part of the spadix, whereas in the latter they are separate, with the female at the base. The Z. aethiopica group also have a fruit that turns soft and orange, whereas the other retains a firm green fruit.

== Toxicity ==
Zantedeschia shares the general properties of the family Araceae in causing contact irritation. Zantedeschia species are also poisonous due to the presence of calcium oxalate crystals in the form of raphides. All parts of the plant are poisonous, typically producing local irritation or a burning sensation in the mouth and occasionally vomiting and diarrhea. However leaves are sometimes cooked and eaten.

== Uses ==
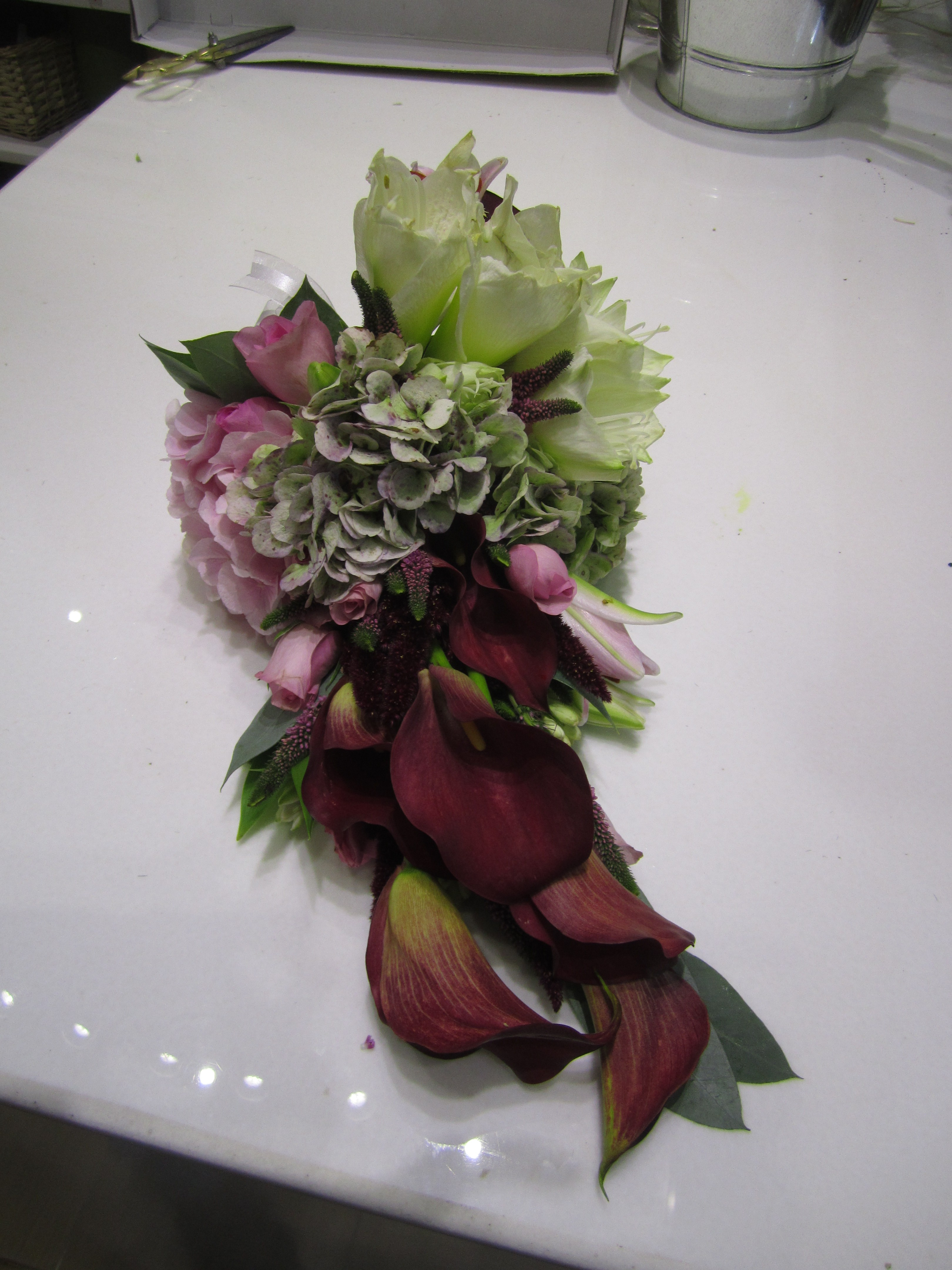
Zantedeschia bridal bouquet with mixed flowers

Extensive commercial production of Zantedeschia for cut flowers and/or planting material occurs in California, Colombia, New Zealand and Kenya. Plant breeders in California and New Zealand continue to produce an extensive range of new hybrid cultivars. The so-called white calla derived from Z. aethiopica. All varieties with flowers with shades of yellow, orange, red, purple are mainly derived from Z. albomaculata, Z. pentlandii, Z. elliottiana and Z. rehmanni.

== Culture ==
Zantedeschia has often been used in paintings and is featured in many of Diego Rivera's works of art (see The Flower Vendor, amongst others). It was a favourite subject of the painter Georgia O'Keeffe.

In Ireland, the calla lily has long been a symbol of Irish republicanism, traditionally worn during Easter to commemorate dead Irish republicans. In this capacity it is often referred to as an Easter lily.
