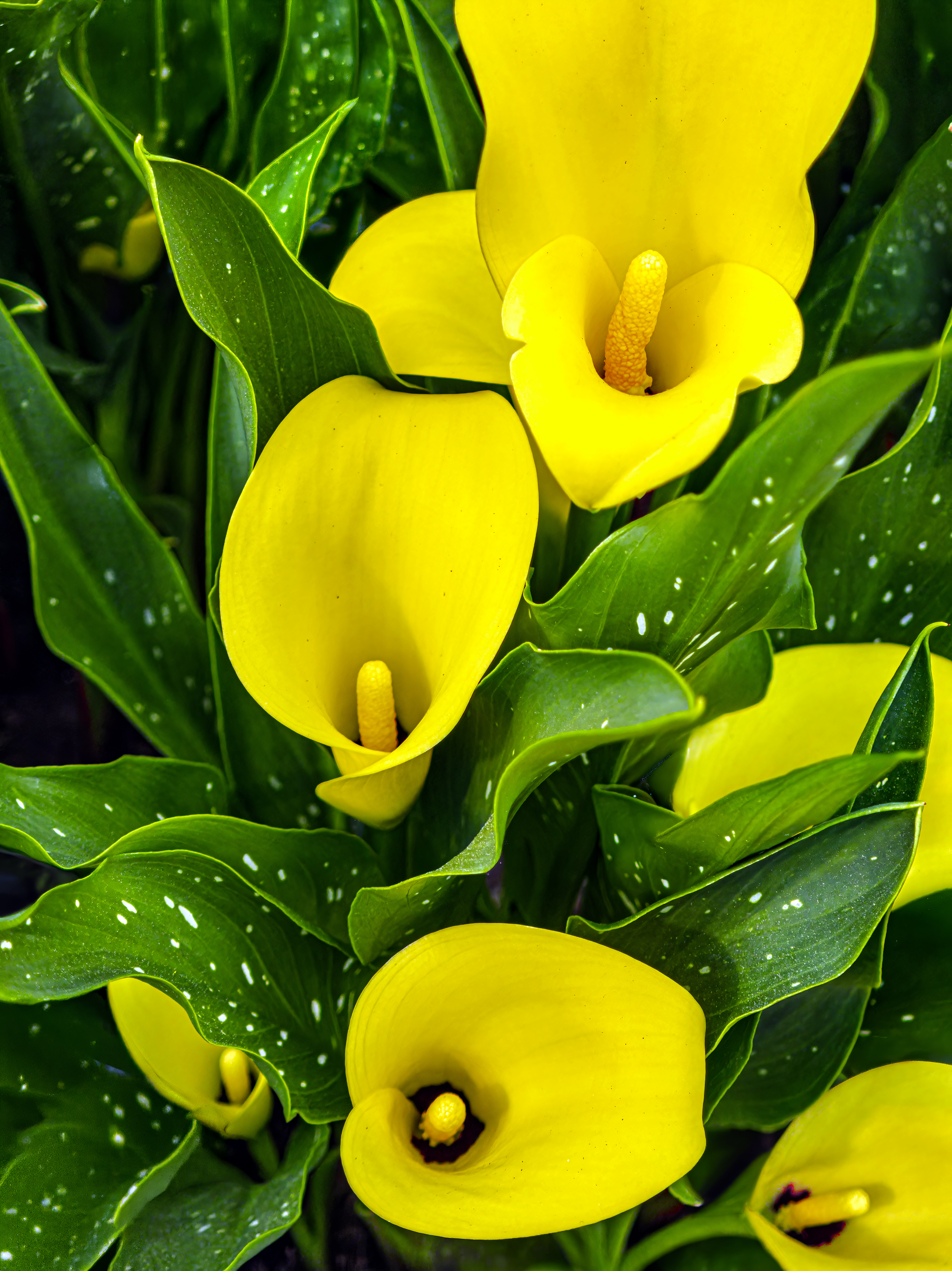

Scientific classification
- Kingdom: Plantae
- Clade: Embryophytes
- Clade: Tracheophytes
- Clade: Spermatophytes
- Clade: Angiosperms
- Clade: Monocots
- Order: Alismatales
- Family: Araceae
- Genus: Zantedeschia
- Species: Z. elliottiana

Binomial name
- Zantedeschia elliottiana (L.) Spreng., 1826

= Zantedeschia elliottiana =

Golden calla lily

Species of flowering plant

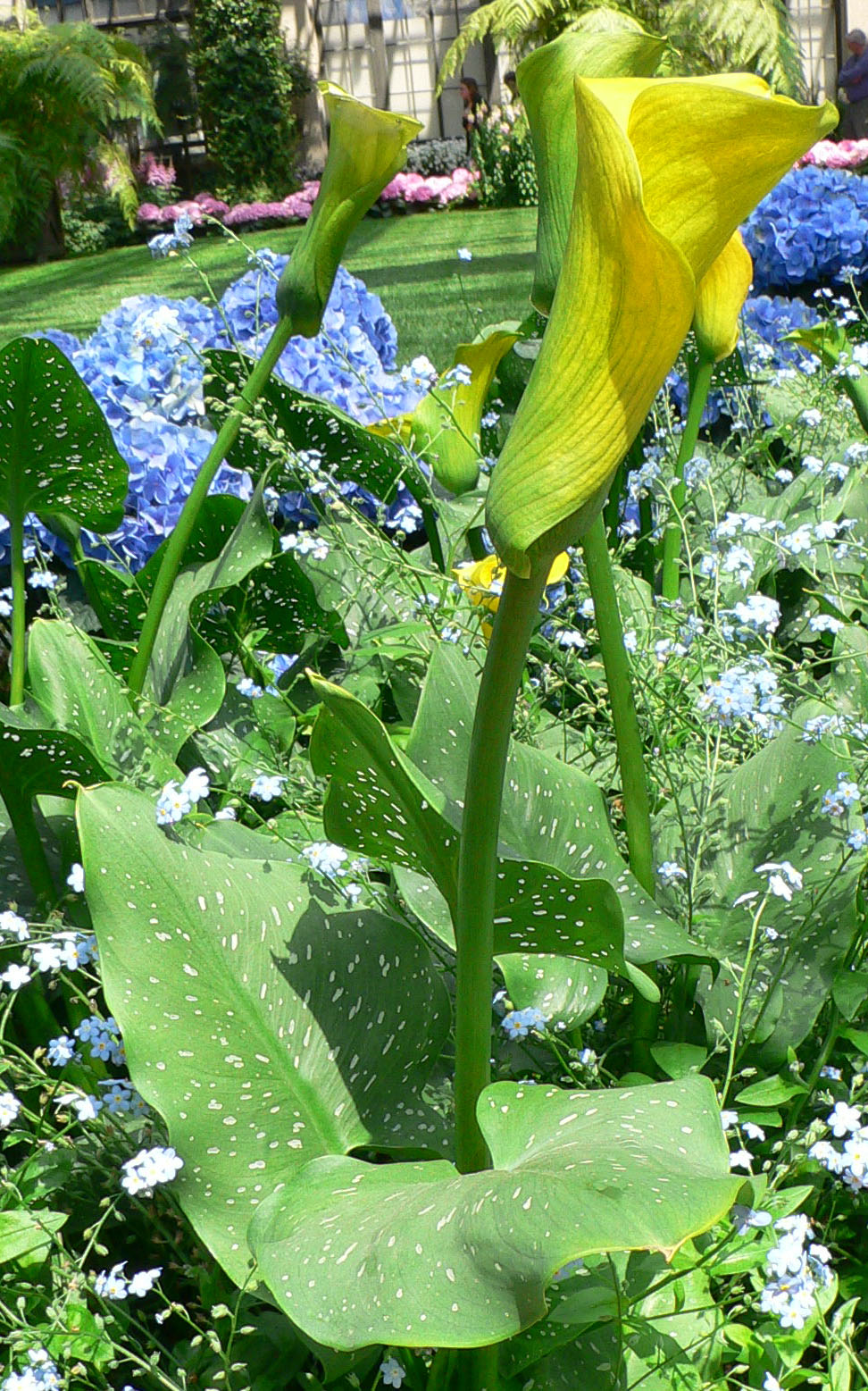
Zantedeschia elliottiana

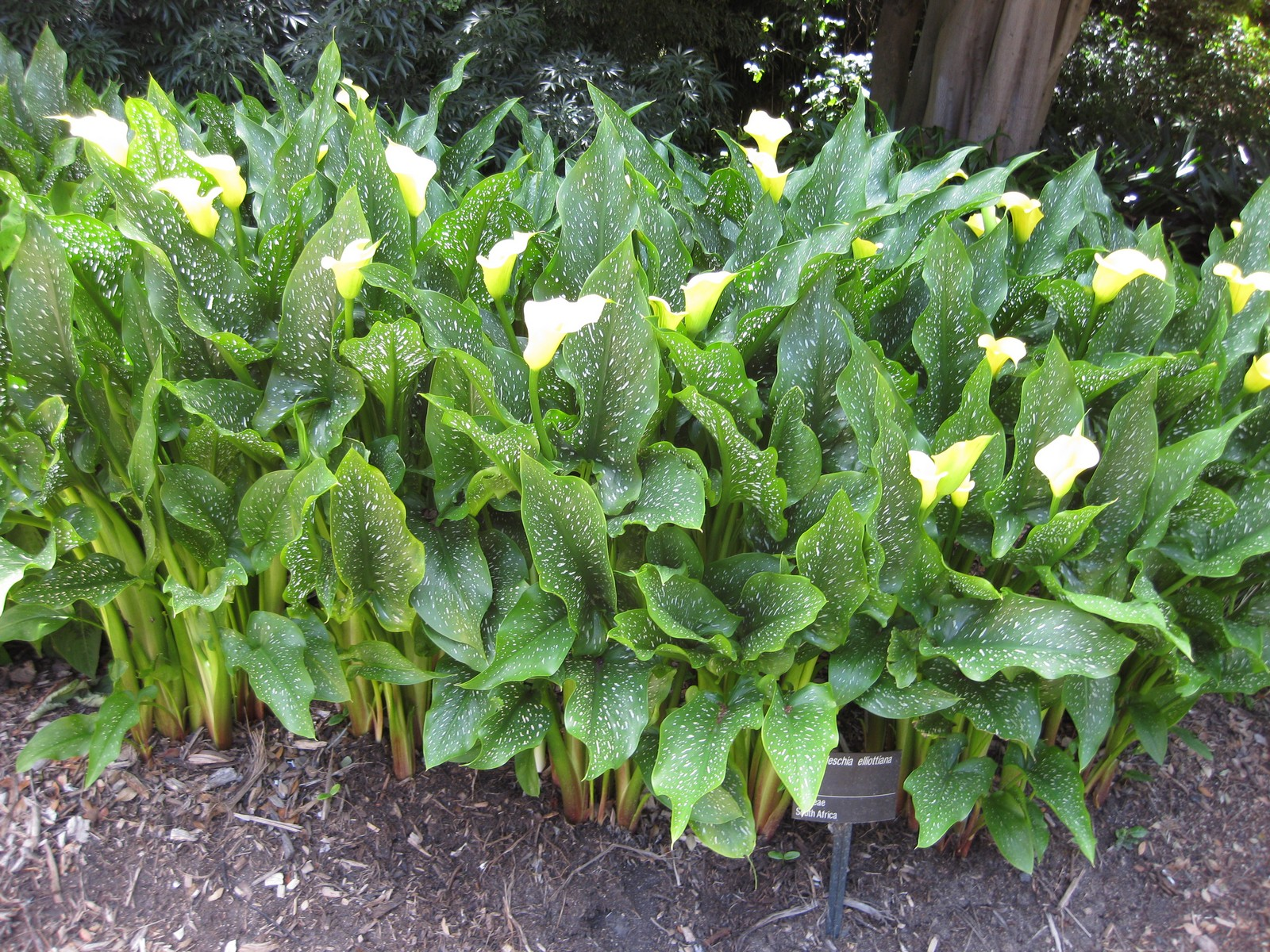

Zantedeschia elliottiana, golden arum or golden calla lily, yellow calla lily, is an ornamental herbaceous plant in the family Araceae. It grows from a bulb. It is said to occur in the province of Mpumalanga in South Africa, although other sources say that it is not found in the wild but appears to be a hybrid of garden origin.

== Description ==
Zantedeschia elliottiana is a herbaceous plant up to 60 cm (2 ft) tall, with large deep green leaves spotted with white. It is summer-flowering plant with a yellow spathe marked with purple at the base. The spathe surrounds a yellow spadix which occasionally produces a spike of bright yellow berries that are attractive to birds.

== Cultivation ==
It (or its cultivar(s)) is a recipient of the Royal Horticultural Society's Award of Garden Merit. It has been shown that, as with other members of the family Araceae, immersing Zantedeschia elliottiana bulbs in gibberellic acid (GA3) solution and planting them at the end of February increases the emergence rate and the number of emerging shoots.
