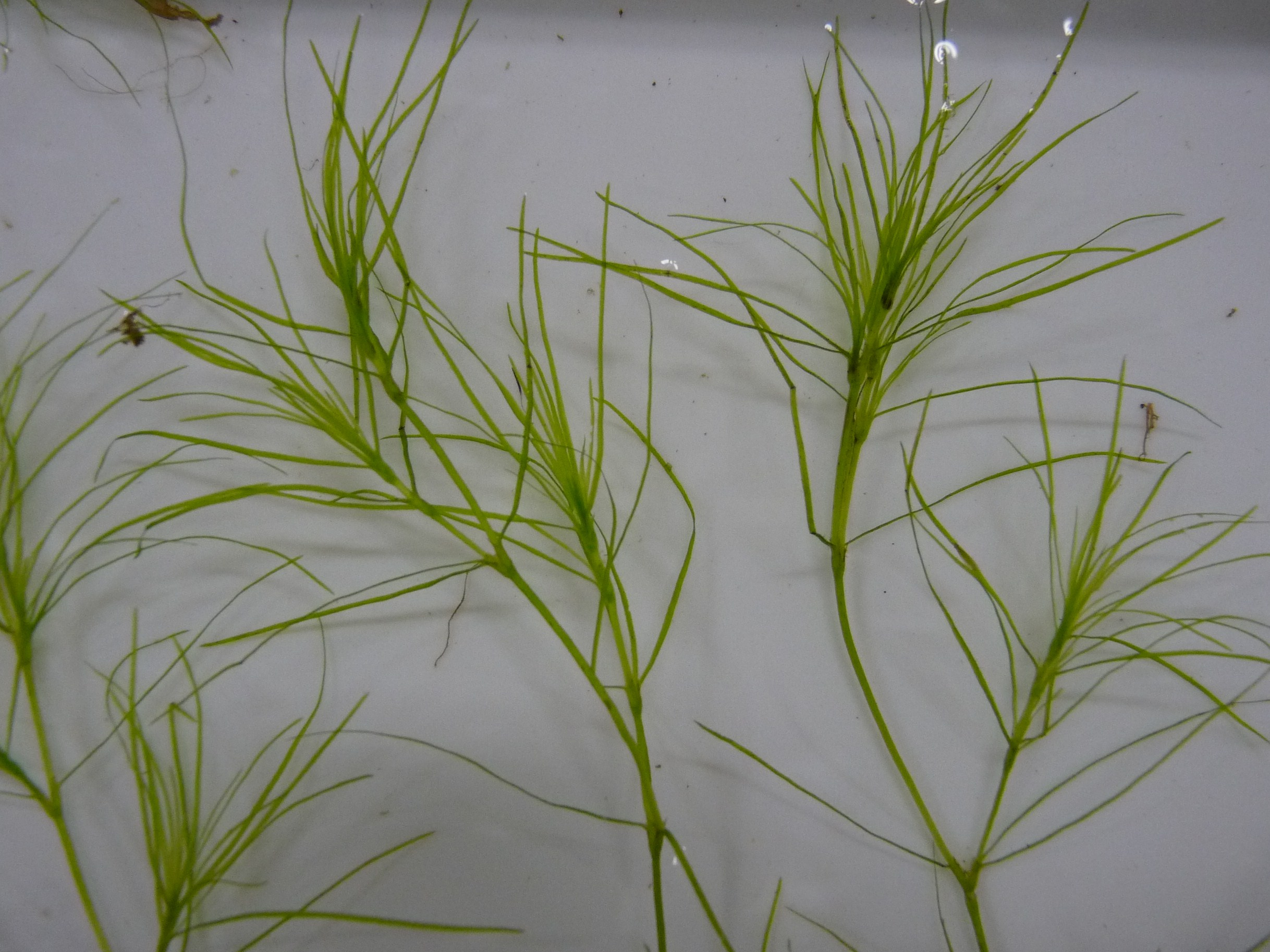

Scientific classification
- Kingdom: Plantae
- Clade: Tracheophytes
- Clade: Angiosperms
- Clade: Monocots
- Order: Alismatales
- Family: Hydrocharitaceae
- Genus: Najas
- Species: N. graminea

Binomial name
- Najas graminea Delile

Synonyms
- Caulinia alagnensis Pollini; Caulinia fragilis var. intermedia (Balb. & Nocca) Nyman; Caulinia graminea (Delile) Tzvelev; Caulinia intermedia Balb. & Nocca; Caulinia microphylla Balb. & Nocca; Caulinia serristipula (Maxim.) Nakai; Najas alagensis Poll.; Najas microphylla (Balb. & Nocca) Rchb.; Najas seminuda Griff.; Najas serristipula Maxim.; Najas tenuifolia Asch.

= Najas graminea =

Ricefield water-nymph

Species of aquatic plant

Najas graminea, also known as ricefield water-nymph is a species of aquatic plant found in freshwater habitats, especially still or slow-moving waters, like ponds and rice fields. It grows to a maximum length of 30 cm. The flowers are monoecious. The flowering season is from July to September.

The natural distribution of this annual plant covers most of Africa as well as the Middle East, Central Asia, East Asia, Southeast Asia, New Guinea, New Caledonia and northern Australia. It has become naturalized in Spain, Italy, Bulgaria, Crimea and California. This plant is also commercialized in the aquarium trade.
