= Giovanni Zantedeschi =

Italian physician and botanist

Giovanni Zantedeschi (3 May 1773, Molina, – 16 May 1846, Bovegno) was an Italian medical doctor and an important Italian botanist.

He studied in Verona and later in Padua, where he graduated with honors, in medicine and surgery. He completed his training in Verona, and practiced his profession for some time in Tremosine (Province of Brescia) and subsequently in Bovegno, until his death in 1846.

Being passionate about botany, he published ten works on the flora of the province of Brescia. This was a legacy of his friendship with Professor Ciro Pollini (1782–1833), a Veronese botanist and author of the authoritative work Flora Veronensis ("Flora of Verona"). He also maintained an eager scientific correspondence with the German botanist Kurt Sprengel (1766 - 1833) who named the plant Zantedeschia in tribute to him.

Four plant varieties were discovered and described by Zantedeschi for the first time.

Molina, his birthplace, has dedicated the botanical museum, Museo Botanico della Lessinia di Molina, to him. It holds over 300 species of flora from the region which include many exemplary orchids.
