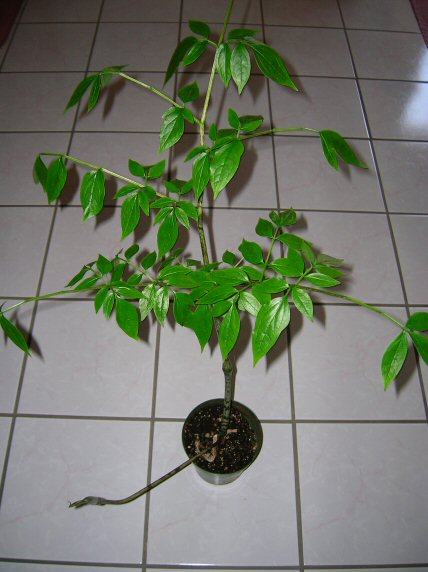

Scientific classification
- Kingdom: Plantae
- Clade: Tracheophytes
- Clade: Angiosperms
- Clade: Monocots
- Order: Alismatales
- Family: Araceae
- Genus: Gonatopus
- Species: G. boivinii

Binomial name
- Gonatopus boivinii (Decne.) Engl.

= Gonatopus boivinii =

Species of flowering plant

Gonatopus boivinii is a robust perennial herbaceous plant belonging to the family Araceae. It is commonly known as giraffe's knees and sand forest arum.

== Description ==
This plant can grow up to 1.2 meters tall, with a solitary, 3-pinnate leaf on a long stalk featuring a prominent swollen node. The leaflets are rhombic, mid to dark green with distinct venation, and the petiole often displays dull greyish silver with olive green mottling and dark brown-black spots. Its tubers can reach 3–5 inches in diameter

Flowering occurs from November to December, with 1–5 flowers appearing alongside the leaf; the spathe can reach up to 22 cm in length and is creamy-yellow inside, while the spadix is also creamy-yellow. The inflorescence is borne on a peduncle that is produced with the leaf and is enclosed at the base by membranous sheaths. Its growth typically begins at the start of the rainy season.

== Distribution ==
It often grows in sand forests, deciduous woodlands, and forest or woodland margins, usually at altitudes between 40 and 1,000 meters and is found in Kenya, Tanzania, Malawi, the Democratic Republic of the Congo, Mozambique, Zimbabwe, Zambia, and KwaZulu-Natal.

== Gallery ==
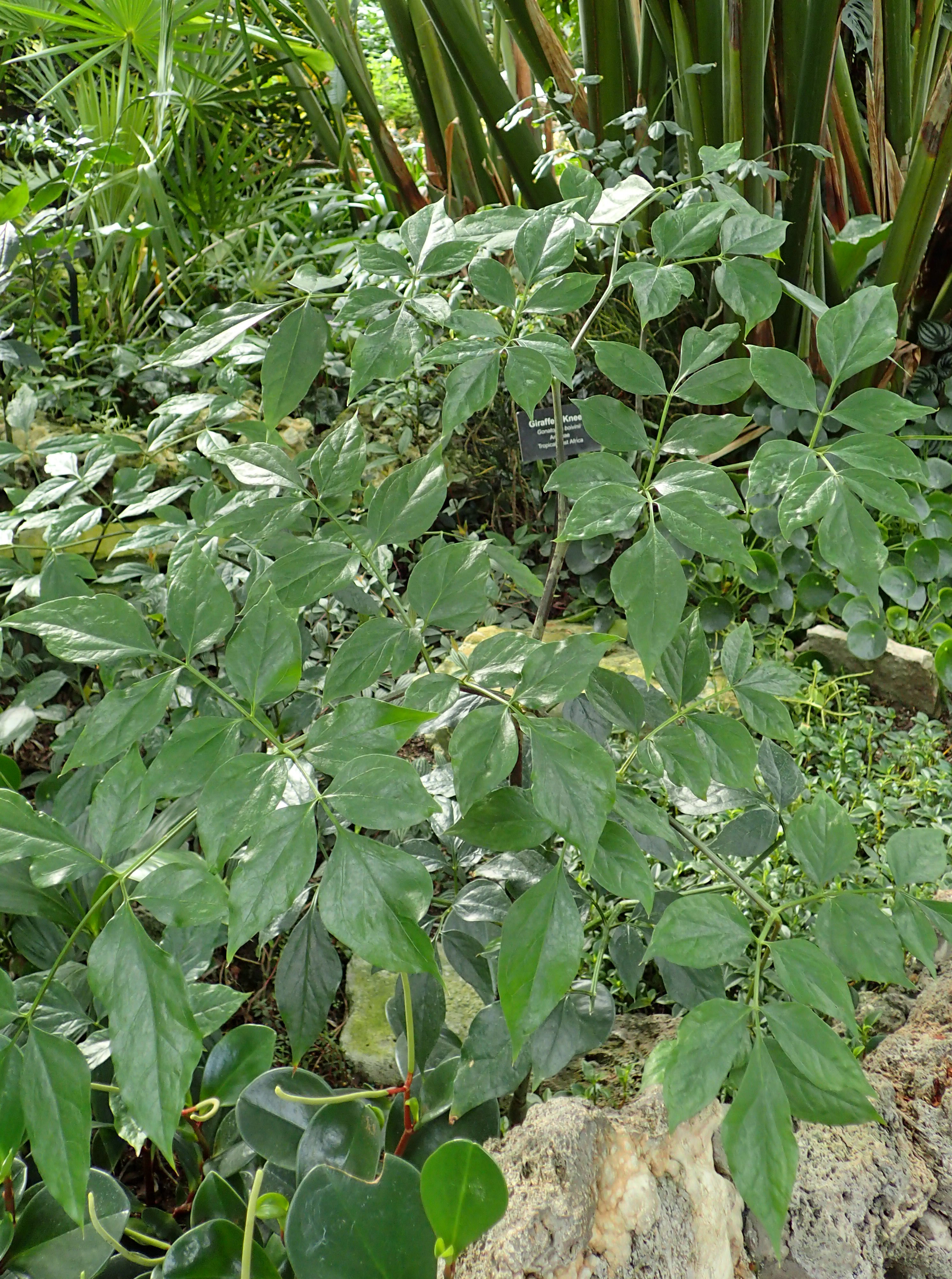
Gonatopus boivinii in Lincoln Park Conservatory, Chicago
