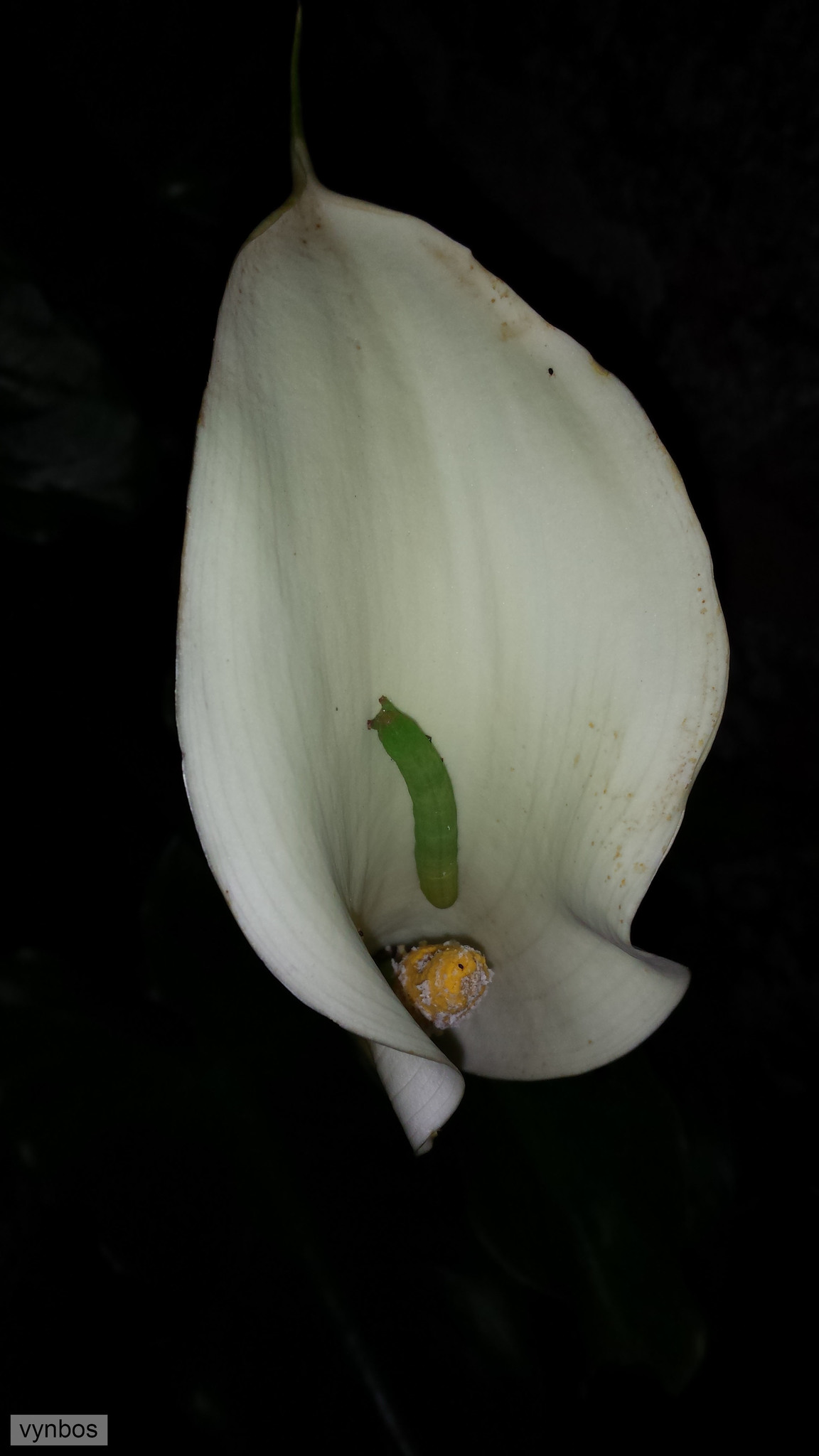

Scientific classification
- Kingdom: Plantae
- Clade: Tracheophytes
- Clade: Angiosperms
- Clade: Monocots
- Order: Alismatales
- Family: Araceae
- Genus: Zantedeschia
- Species: Z. odorata

Binomial name
- Zantedeschia odorata P.L.Perry

= Zantedeschia odorata =

Species of flowering plant

Zantedeschia odorata, the Bokkeveld arum, is a species in the arum family, Araceae. It is a tuberous, perennial plant that grows to a height of 75 to 100 cm (30 to 39 in). The flowers are yellow, have long and narrow veins, and are enclosed by a white leathery bract. The leaves are arrow-shaped. The plant grows in wetlands or along streams.

The plant is rare and indigenous to the Northern Cape, South Africa, where it occurs on the Bokkeveld escarpment near Nieuwoudtville.

In Afrikaans it is known as soetvarkbloem.

It was first described in 1989.
