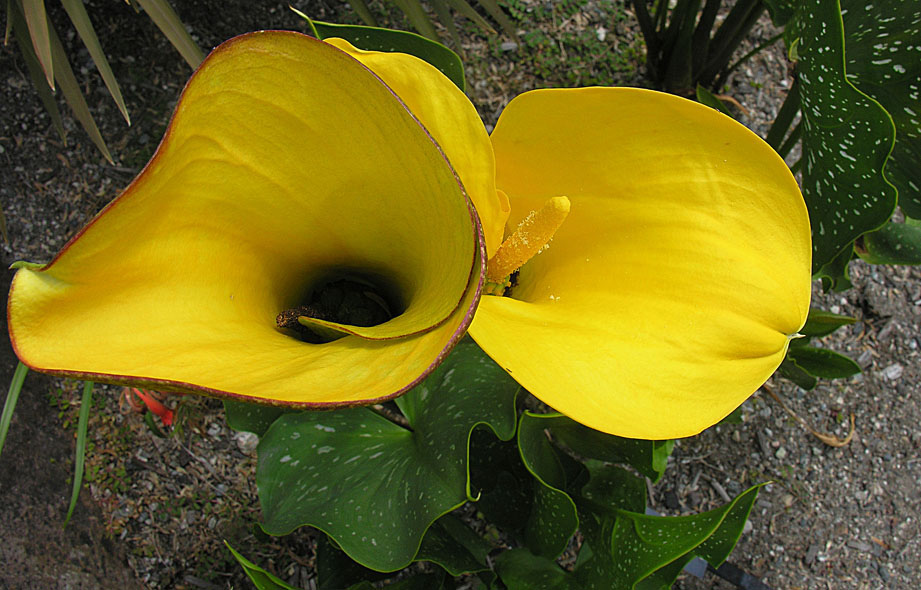

Scientific classification
- Kingdom: Plantae
- Clade: Tracheophytes
- Clade: Angiosperms
- Clade: Monocots
- Order: Alismatales
- Family: Araceae
- Genus: Zantedeschia
- Species: Z. jucunda

Binomial name
- Zantedeschia jucunda Letty (1961)

= Zantedeschia jucunda =

Species of flowering plant

Zantedeschia jucunda, the Highveld golden arum, is a perennial, flowering plant and geophyte that is part of the Araceae family. The species is endemic to Limpopo and occurs on the summit of the Leoloberge. The plant has an area of occurrence of less than 380 km^{2}. The plant is threatened by illegal collection by humans as well as mining and human activities.
