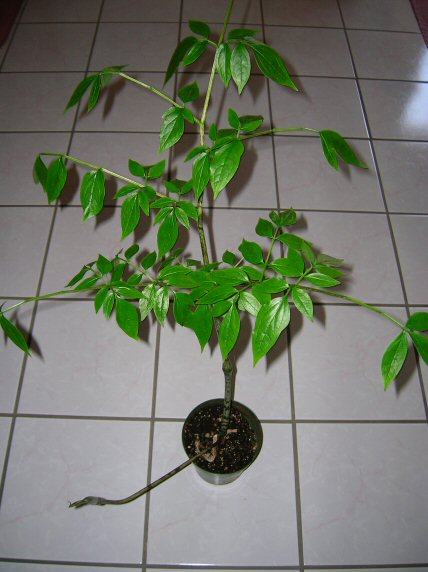
- Gonatopus boivinii in cultivation

Scientific classification
- Kingdom: Plantae
- Clade: Tracheophytes
- Clade: Angiosperms
- Clade: Monocots
- Order: Alismatales
- Family: Araceae
- Subfamily: Zamioculcadoideae
- Genus: Gonatopus; Engl.

Species
- See here

Synonyms
- Heterolobium Peter; Microculcas Peter

= Gonatopus (plant) =

Genus of flowering plants

Gonatopus is a genus of flowering plants in the family Araceae, consisting of five species. This genus is native to southeastern Africa and is closely related to the genus Zamioculcas.

== Description ==
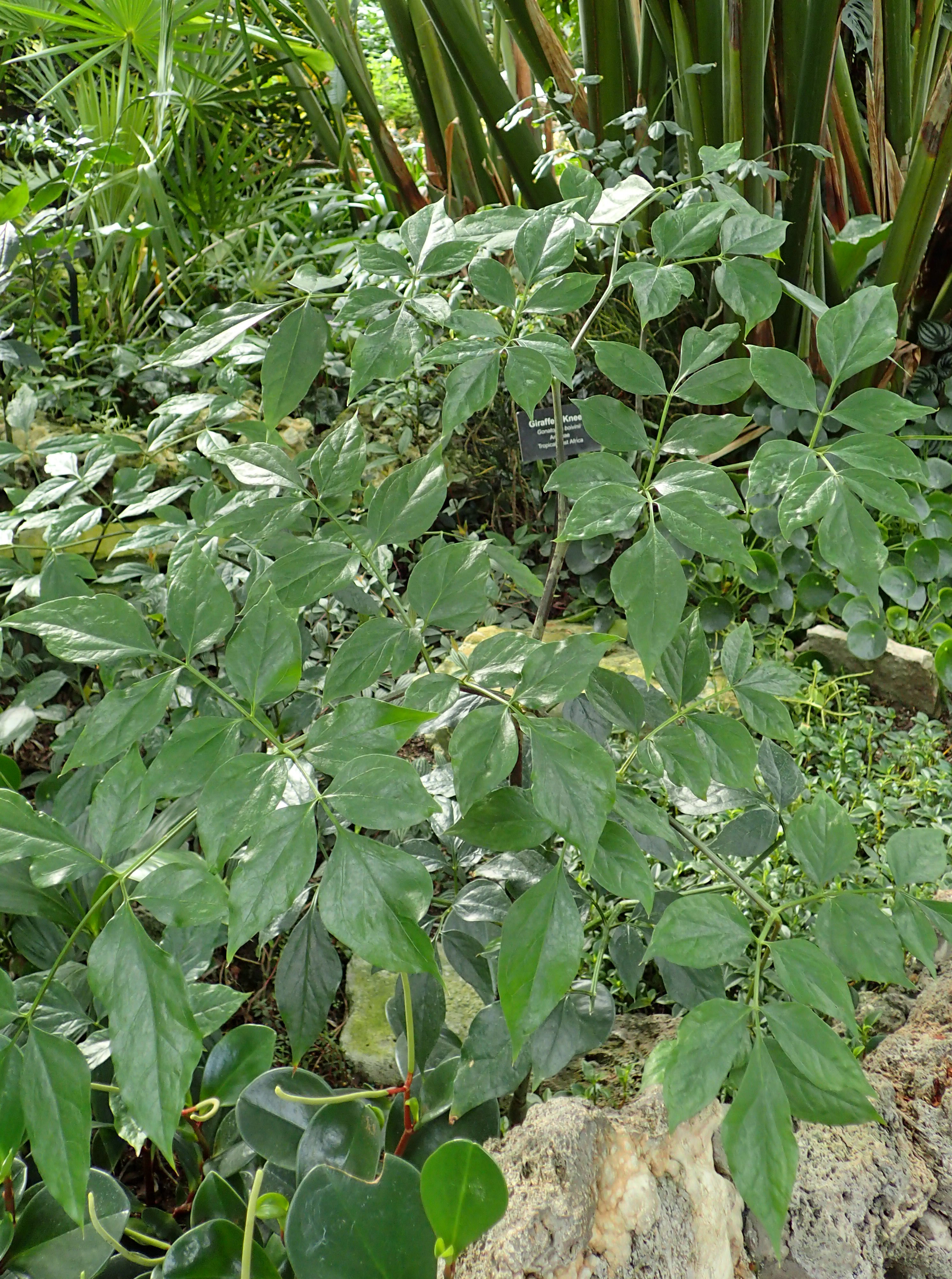
Gonatopus boivinii growing in Lincoln Park Conservatory, Chicago

=== Vegetative characteristics ===
Gonatopus are terrestrial, rhizomatous or tuberous, seasonally dormant herbs with large, solitary mostly petiolate, or rarely decurrent leaves.

=== Generative characteristics ===
The plant bears 1–4 inflorescences. The unisexual flowers have four fleshy tepals. The stigma is capitate. The orange, red, yellow, or white, ovoid to ellipsoid berry bears 1–2 ovoid to ellipsoid seeds.

== Taxonomy ==
It was described by Adolf Engler in 1879. It is closely related to the genus Zamioculcas.

=== Species ===
It has five species:

- Gonatopus angustus N.E.Br.
- Gonatopus boivinii (Decne.) Engl.
- Gonatopus clavatus Mayo
- Gonatopus marattioides (Peter) Bogner
- Gonatopus petiolulatus (Peter) Bogner

== Cultivation ==
The most commonly found Gonatopus species in private collections and botanical gardens is Gonatopus boivinii. Its common name giraffe's knees is derived from the resemblance of the swollen part of the petiole with the knee of a giraffe. Since Gonatopus boivinii is tropical in origin, it may be grown as an indoor plant. It is cultivated as an ornamental plant, and may display mottled and spotted colouration on the leaves and the inflorescence. The plants should be kept warm, and in filtered light or light shade. After the growing season, the tubers can be stored outside of the soil.
