= Zantedeschia valida =

Scientific classification
- Kingdom: Plantae
- Clade: Tracheophytes
- Clade: Angiosperms
- Clade: Monocots
- Order: Alismatales
- Family: Araceae
- Genus: Zantedeschia
- Species: Z. valida

Binomial name
- Zantedeschia valida (Letty) Y.Singh, (1996)

Synonyms
- Zantedeschia albomaculata subsp. valida Letty

Species of flowering plant

Zantedeschia valida, the Drakensberg arum, is a perennial, flower-bearing plant and geophyte that is part of the Araceae family. The plant is endemic to KwaZulu-Natal and occurs between Ladysmith and Dundee.
