= Zantedeschia pentlandii =

Scientific classification
- Kingdom: Plantae
- Clade: Embryophytes
- Clade: Tracheophytes
- Clade: Spermatophytes
- Clade: Angiosperms
- Clade: Monocots
- Order: Alismatales
- Family: Araceae
- Genus: Zantedeschia
- Species: Z. pentlandii

Binomial name
- Zantedeschia pentlandii (R.Whyte ex W.Watson) Wittm.

Species of flowering plant

Zantedeschia pentlandii, the Sekhukhune golden arum, is a species in the arum family, Araceae.

== Description ==
It is a tuberous, perennial plant that grows from 40 to 60 cm (16 to 24 in) in height. The flowers are yellow, a long narrow vein that is 8 to 9 cm (3.1 to 3.5 in) and are surrounded by a yellow leathery bract with a purple spot in the base. The leaves are arrow-shaped.

== Distribution and habitat ==
The plant grows in rocky grassland and open woodland between dolerite blocks. The plant is native to Mpumalanga and Limpopo where it occurs from Roossenekal to Dullstroom.

In Afrikaans, it is known as the geelvarkoor.
