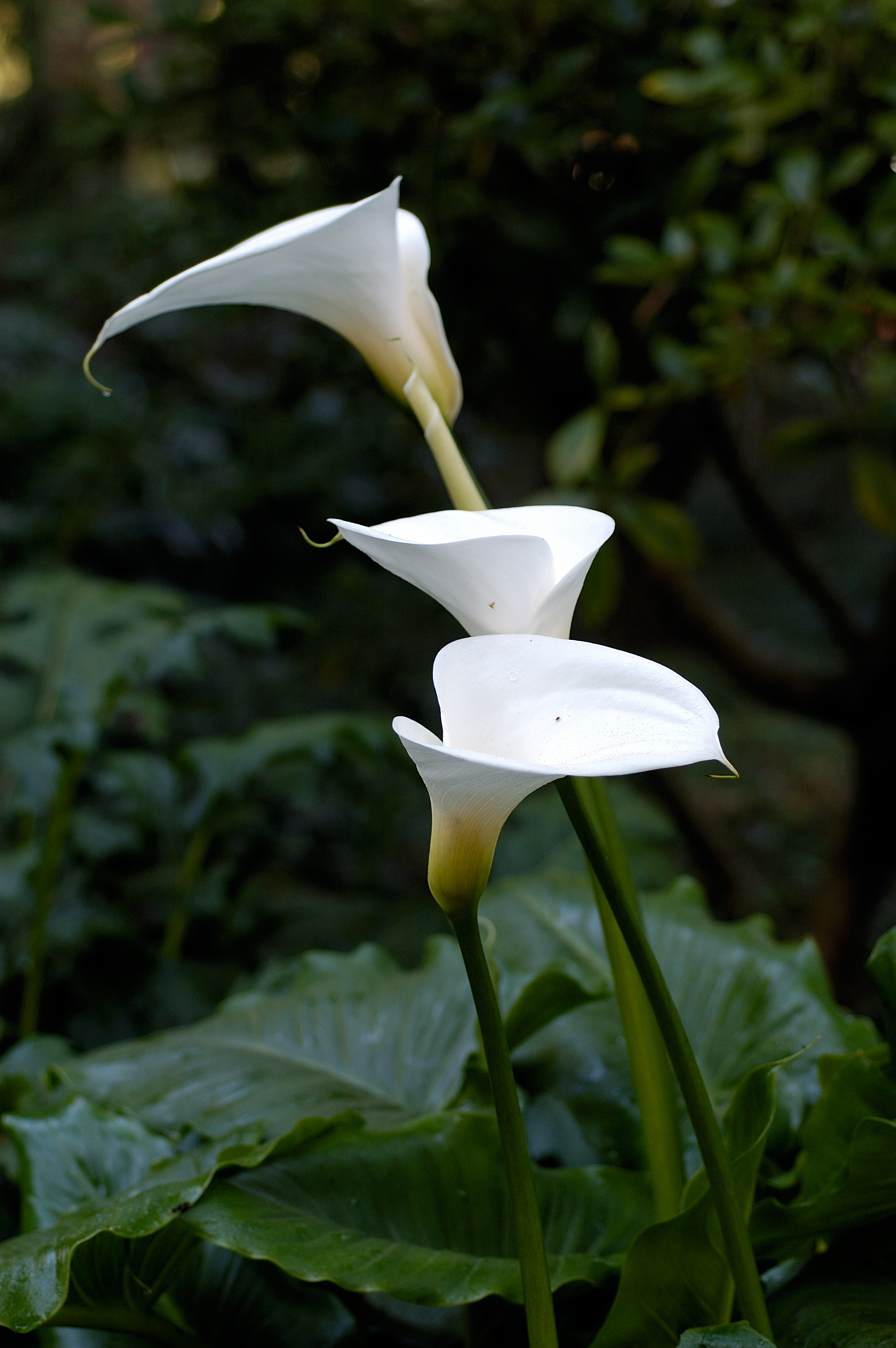

Conservation status
- Least Concern (IUCN 3.1)

Scientific classification
- Kingdom: Plantae
- Clade: Tracheophytes
- Clade: Angiosperms
- Clade: Monocots
- Order: Alismatales
- Family: Araceae
- Genus: Zantedeschia
- Species: Z. aethiopica

Binomial name
- Zantedeschia aethiopica (L.) Spreng., 1826

Synonyms
- Calla aethiopica L.; Richardia africana Kunth; Richardia aethiopica (L.) Spreng.; Colocasia aethiopica (L.) Spreng. ex Link

= Zantedeschia aethiopica =

Species of flowering plant

Zantedeschia aethiopica, commonly known as calla lily, arum lily, and death lily, is a species of flowering plant in the family Araceae, native to southern Africa in Lesotho, South Africa, and Eswatini.

== Description ==
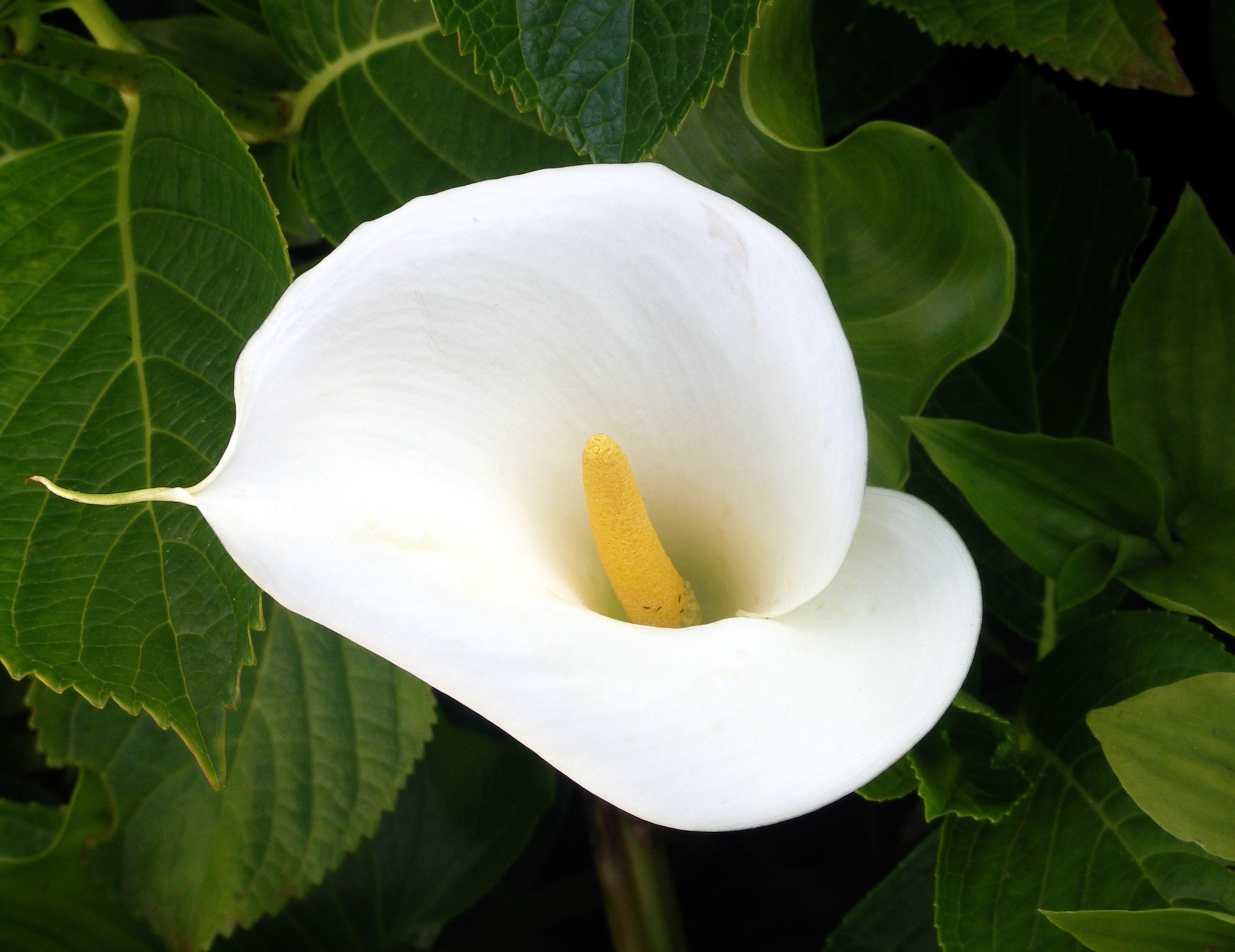
Inflorescence and spathe

Zantedeschia aethiopica is a rhizomatous herbaceous perennial plant, evergreen where rainfall and temperatures are adequate, deciduous where there is a dry season. Its preferred habitat is in or on the banks of streams and ponds. It grows to 0.6–1 m (2.0–3.3 ft) tall, with large clumps of broad, arrow shaped dark green leaves up to 45 cm (18 in) long. The inflorescences are large and are produced in spring, summer and autumn, with a pure white spathe up to 25 cm (9.8 in) and a yellow spadix up to 9 cm (3 1/2 in) long. The spadix produces a faint, sweet fragrance.

Zantedeschia aethiopica contains calcium oxalate, and ingestion of the raw plant may cause a severe burning sensation and swelling of lips, tongue, and throat; stomach pain and diarrhea may occur.

== Distribution and habitat ==
Z. aethiopica is native to southern Africa, specifically Lesotho, Mozambique, South Africa, and Eswatini. It has naturalised in Kenya, Madeira, Azores, Malawi, New Zealand, Tanzania, Zambia, coastal California, in western Europe from the Iberian Peninsula to Ireland, the high altitude mountainous areas of Luzon in the Philippines, and Australia, particularly in Western Australia where it has been classified as a toxic weed and pest. The majority of invasive populations are located in coastal prairies and wetlands near human settlements. It is also a highly invasive species in riparian zones and pastureland of Western Australia and New Zealand. The cultivar 'Green Goddess' is listed in the New Zealand National Pest Plant Accord, which proscribes its cultivation, sale, and distribution.

The reproduction of Z. aethiopica involves seeds dispersal by birds and vegetative propagation through rhizomes that can spread when soil or garden cuttings are moved.

== Cultivation and uses ==
A number of cultivars have been selected as ornamental plants:

- 'Crowborough' is a more cold tolerant cultivar growing to 90 cm (35 in) tall, suited to cool climates, such as Ireland or Britain and the north-western United States.
- 'Green Goddess' has green stripes on the spathes which allow the flowers to last much longer than the original white form. 'Green Goddess' also has a more opened and wider spathe and has the tendency to develop curvy fringes at the edge of the spathe than the original white form. The first generation hybrid of 'Green Goddess' and the original white form have a light green underside on the spathe, allowing the flower to last longer than the original white form, but no green stripes on the top side. The New Zealand National Pest Plant Accord proscribes the cultivation, sale, and distribution of 'Green Goddess'.
- 'Pink Mist' has a pinkish base to the spathe and pink spadix. 'Pink Mist' is not a hybrid, but a colour sport. The pink colour is best developed in partial shade after rain. 'Pink Mist' is quite delicate and weak compared to the original white form and 'Green Goddess'. Unlike the latter, 'Pink Mist' has a dormant period during winter, where the leaves almost die down completely, although it is pure Z. aethiopica. The seedlings of 'Pink Mist' are also weaker than the original white form or 'Green Goddess'.
- 'Red Desire' has a red instead of yellow spadix and appears to be very rare.
- 'White Sail', growing to 90 cm tall, has a very broad spathe.

The cultivars 'Crowborough' and 'Green Goddess' have gained the Royal Horticultural Society's Award of Garden Merit.

In order to introduce colours to the large white calla lilies, like the many colours available in the dwarf summer calla lilies, attempts have been made to hybridise Z. aethiopica with Z. elliotiana. These have resulted in albino progeny, which are non-viable.

Zantedeschia aethiopica can be used for treatment of wastewater due to its tolerance of iron and ability to grow in wet areas.

== Symbolism ==
Until 2011, Zantedeschia aethiopica was the national flower of the island nation of Saint Helena, where it grows widely, but is considered an invasive plant. Further, it is an important symbol of Irish republicanism and nationalism since 1926, because it is used to commemorate the dead of Easter 1916 and onward.

== See also ==
- List of plants known as lily

== Gallery ==
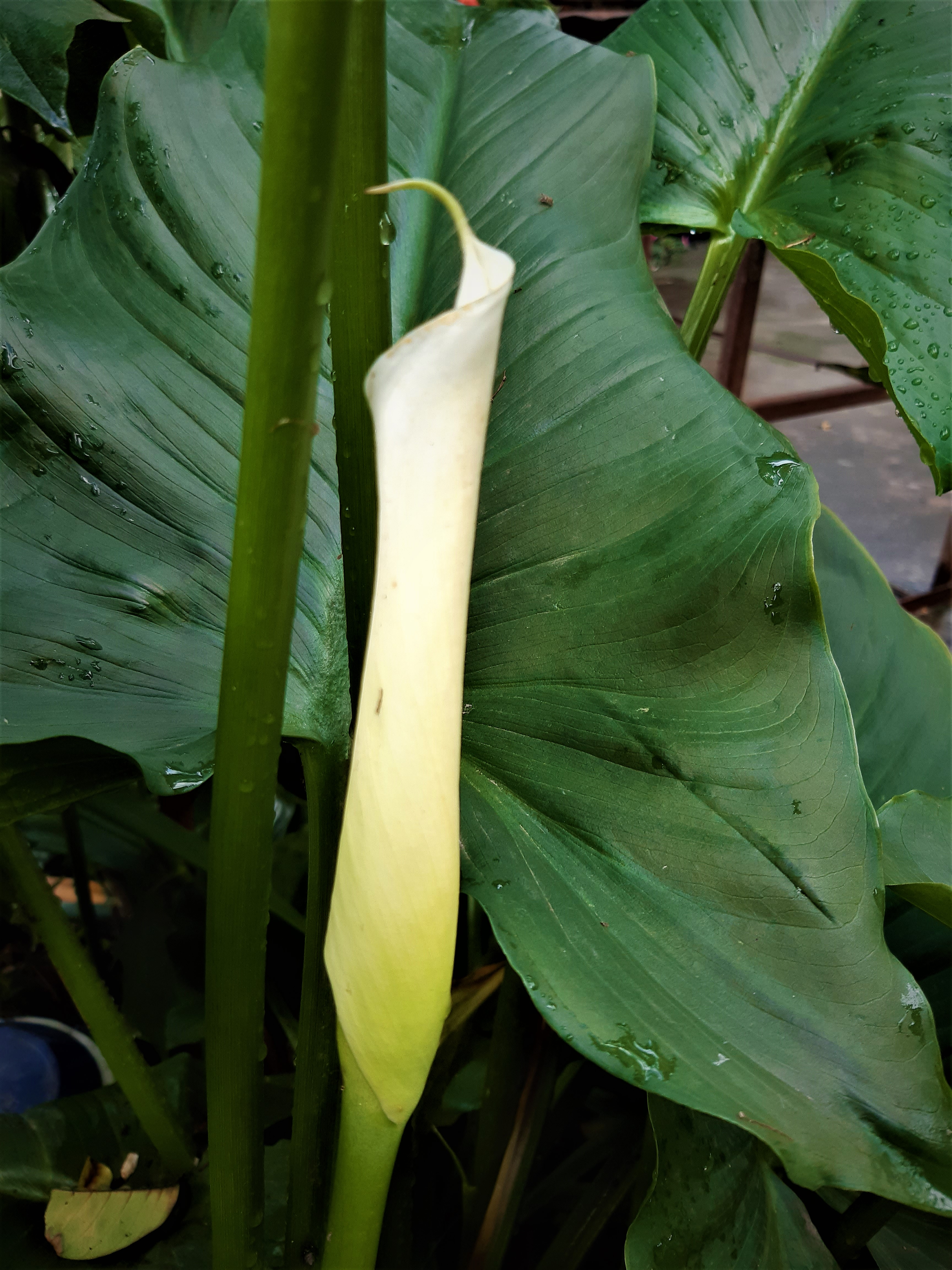
Closed inflorescence

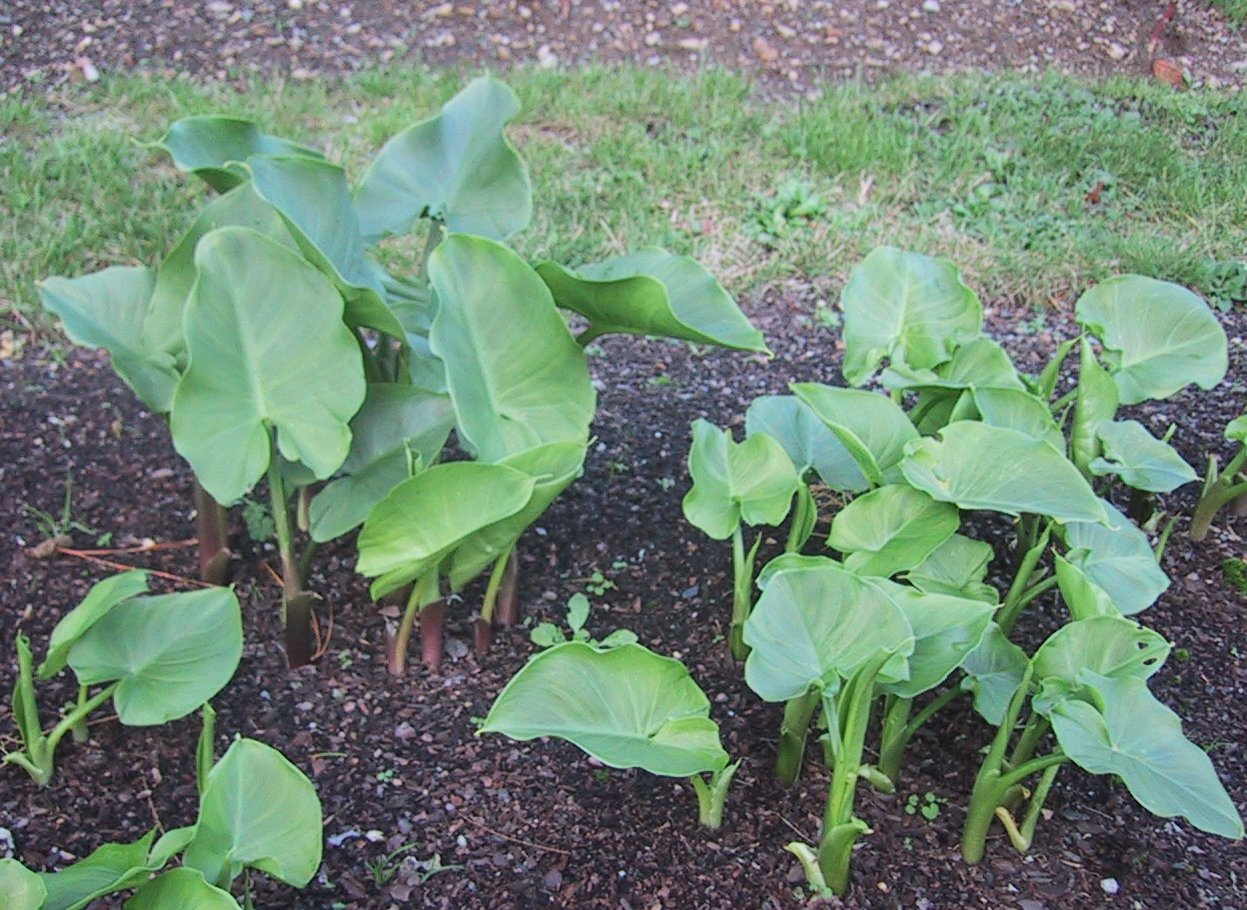
Emerging leaf growth

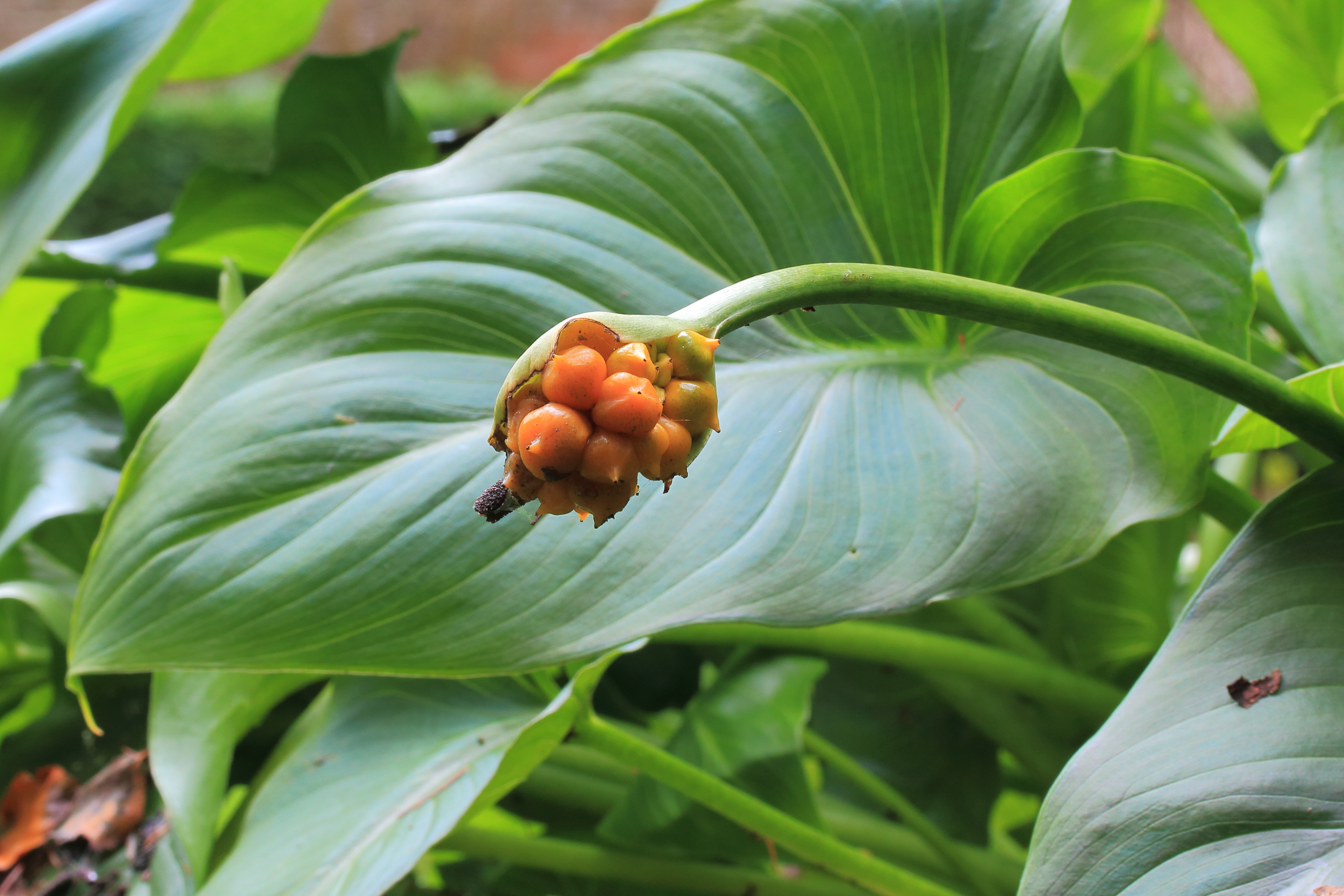
Seeds
