= Limnocharitaceae =

Family of flowering plants

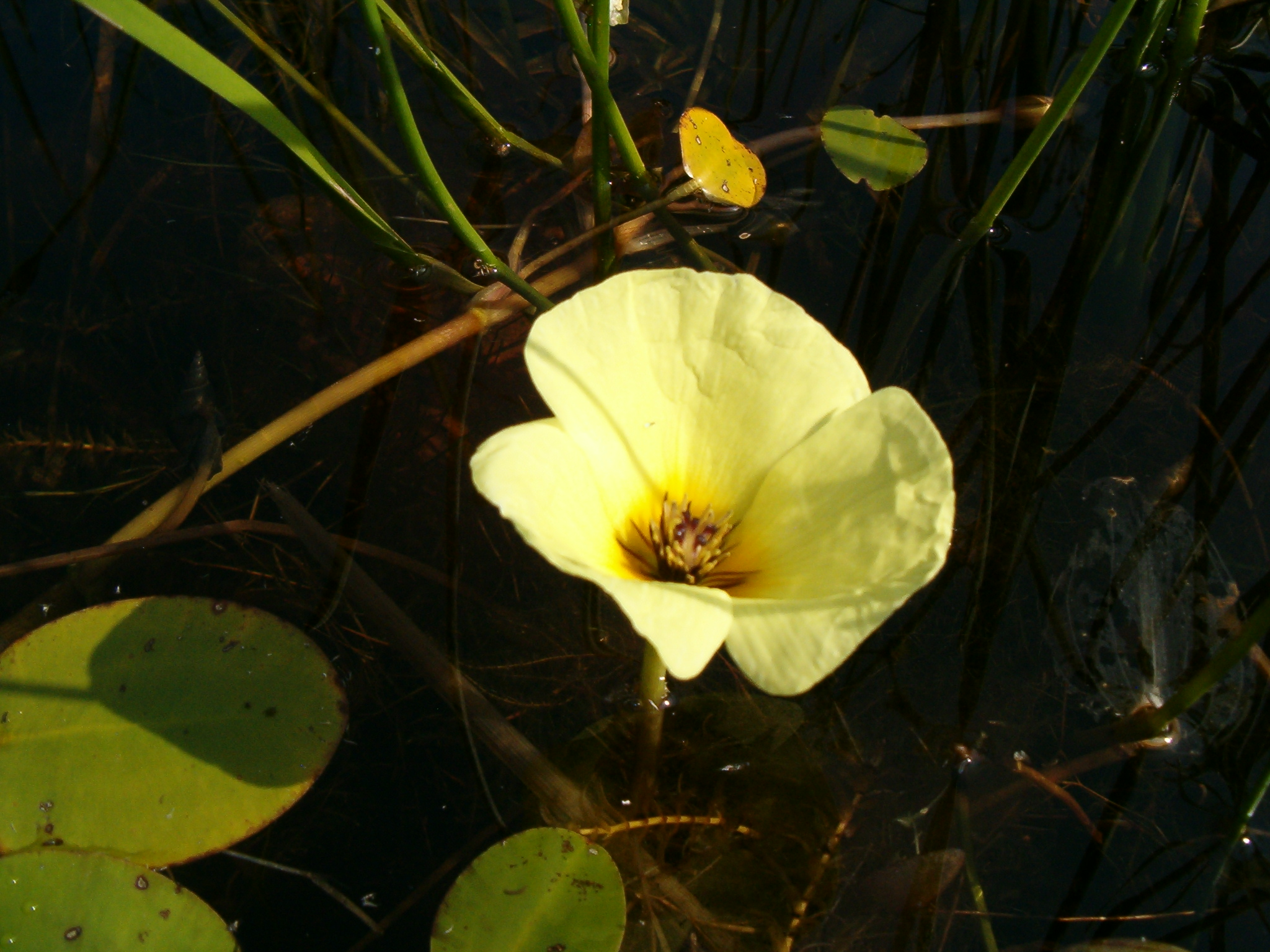
Hydrocleys nymphoides

Limnocharitaceae was a family of flowering plants in the monocot order Alismatales. In the APG IV system, it is included in the family Alismataceae. It is commonly known as the water poppy family. Species that have been placed in this taxon are small, perennial, aquatic herbs, native to the tropics, but adventive or naturalized in the subtropics as a result of cultivation.

The Limnocharitaceae include three genera, and these, in turn comprise eight species. Some of the species are closely related and, consequently, hard to identify. Butomopsis is monospecific (B. latifolia) and indigenous to tropical Africa, Southeast Asia, and northern Australia. Limnocharis and Hydrocleys are native to the neotropics. Limnocharis has two species. Limnocharis flava is grown as a potherb in India and Isan, Thailand. It has become a weed in Indonesia. It is sometimes sold as an ornamental for aquaria. Hydrocleys has five species. Hydrocleys nymphoides is common in water gardens, and probably for this reason, it is persistent in the wild in Florida and Texas.

== Genera ==
- Butomopsis Kunth
  - Butomopsis latifolia Kunth
- Hydrocleys Richard
- Limnocharis Humboldt & Bonpland
  - Limnocharis laforestii Duchassaing
  - Limnocharis flava (L.) Buchenau - sawah-lettuce

== Description ==
The following description is based on two sources.

Perennial herbs with unbranched stems. Leaves basal, petiolate. Stomata paracytic. Laticifers present. Inflorescence scapose, with bracts subtending each flower. Flowers actinomorphic, bisexual, solitary or in pseudoumbels. Sepals 3, persistent. Petals 3, white or yellow. Stamens 3 to 100. Ovary superior. Carpels 3 to 20, in 1 (rarely 2) whorls, free or basally connate. Ovules 12 to 100 per carpel and scattered over the inner surface. Fruit a follicle.

== Taxonomy ==
Some authors have placed Butomus in the Limnocharitaceae because of its laminar placentation and follicular fruit, but it is now placed in the monospecific family Butomaceae.

The Limnocharitaceae are closely related to the Alismataceae, but differ from them by the fully dehiscent fruit, numerous ovules per carpel, and laminar placentation. Members of both of these families have laticifers, petioles, a terminal pore on each leaf, a sepaloid calyx, and thin, evanescent petals.

The family Limnocharitaceae was separated from the Alismataceae by Armen Takhtajan in 1954, but was not validly published until a Latin diagnosis was supplied by Arthur J. Cronquist in 1981. The Limnocharitaceae were recognized by the Angiosperm Phylogeny Group in their APG II system of 2003, but in their APG III system of 2009, they sank the family back into the Alismataceae. Some molecular phylogenetic studies have indicated that the Limnocharitaceae might not be monophyletic, but paraphyletic over the Alismataceae sensu stricto.

The Limnocharitaceae are recognized as a distinct family by Heywood et al. 2007.
