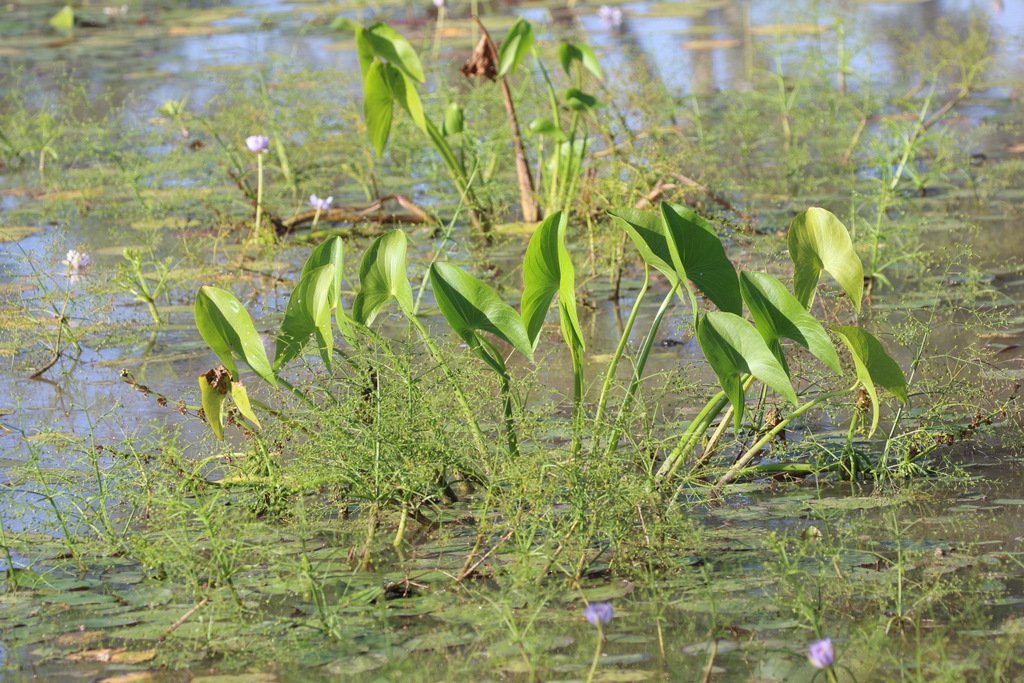
- Astonia australiensis

Scientific classification
- Kingdom: Plantae
- Clade: Tracheophytes
- Clade: Angiosperms
- Clade: Monocots
- Order: Alismatales
- Family: Alismataceae
- Genus: Astonia; S.W.L.Jacobs
- Species: A. australiensis

Binomial name
- Astonia australiensis (Aston) S.W.L.Jacobs

= Astonia =

Genus of aquatic plants

Astonia is a monotypic genus in the Alismataceae family, containing the sole species Astonia australiensis found in Queensland, Australia. It is sometimes included in the genus Limnophyton and was named in honour of Australian botanist Helen Aston.
