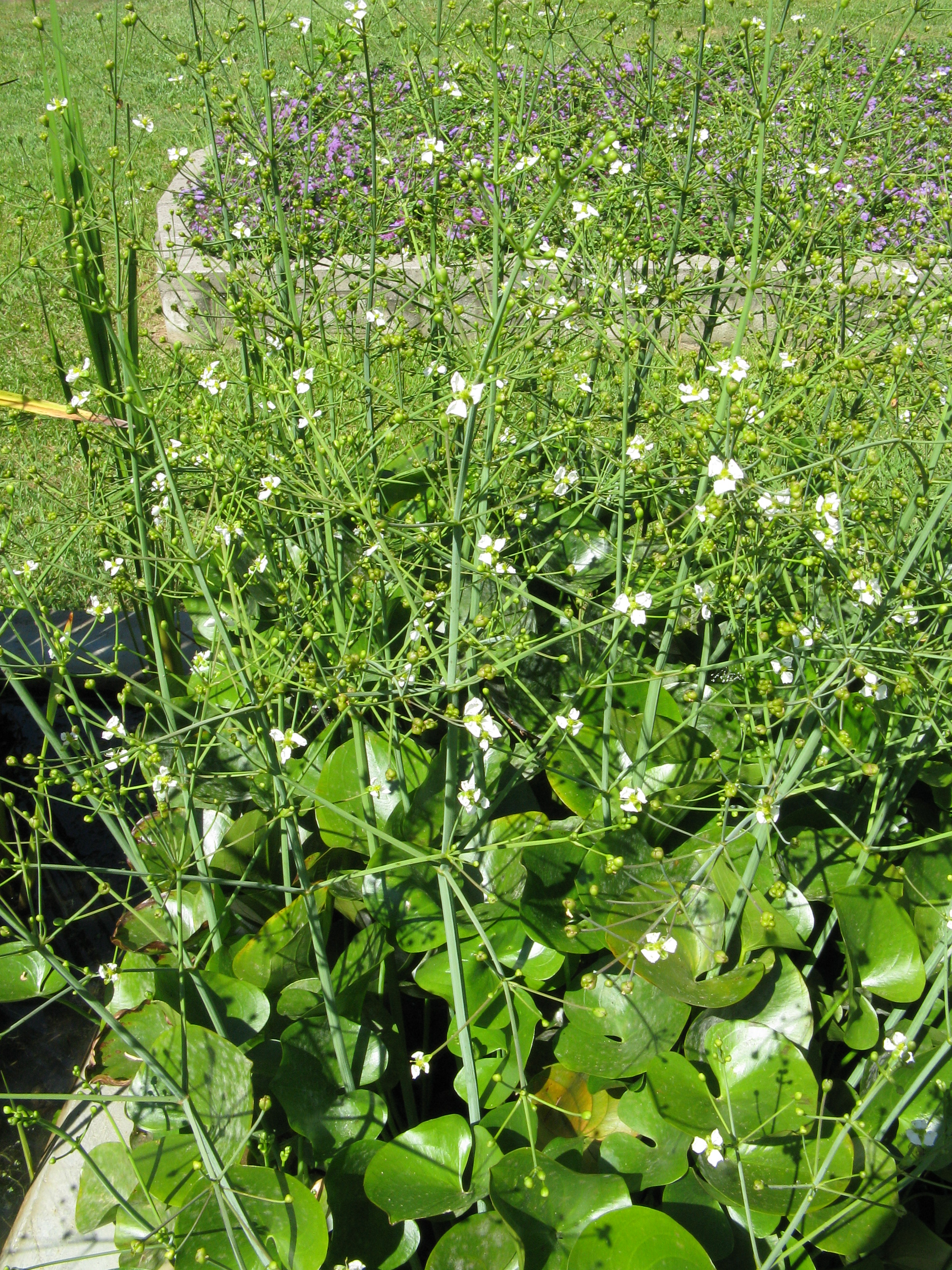

Conservation status
- Least Concern (IUCN 3.1)

Scientific classification
- Kingdom: Plantae
- Clade: Embryophytes
- Clade: Tracheophytes
- Clade: Spermatophytes
- Clade: Angiosperms
- Clade: Monocots
- Order: Alismatales
- Family: Alismataceae
- Genus: Caldesia
- Species: C. parnassifolia

Binomial name
- Caldesia parnassifolia (L.) Parl.

Synonyms
- Alisma calyophyllum Wall.; Alisma damasonium Willd.; Alisma dubium Willd.; Alisma parnassifolium Bassi; Alisma reniforme D.Don; Caldesia parnassifolia subsp. euparnassiifolia Asch. & Graebn.; Caldesia parnassifolia var. major (Micheli) Buchenau; Caldesia reniformis (D.Don) Makino; Echinodorus parnassifolius (Bassi) Engelm.

= Caldesia parnassifolia =

Species of aquatic plant

Caldesia parnassifolia, is an aquatic species in the Alismataceae. It is found in slow-moving fresh water.

== Distribution and habitat ==
Caldesia parnassifolia occurs in lakes and ponds. It is known from Asian fresh waters of across much of Europe, Asia, Africa and Australia, from France to the Russian Far East and south to Botswana, Madagascar and Queensland, Australia.

It is now extinct in Austria, Bulgaria and Switzerland.

The leaves of Caldesia parnassifolia (Alisma reniforme) can be affected by the water-born fungi, Doassansiopsis martianoffiana.
