= Ranalisma rostrata =

Conservation status
- Data Deficient (IUCN 3.1)

Scientific classification
- Kingdom: Plantae
- Clade: Tracheophytes
- Clade: Angiosperms
- Clade: Monocots
- Order: Alismatales
- Family: Alismataceae
- Genus: Ranalisma
- Species: R. rostrata

Binomial name
- Ranalisma rostrata Stapf. 1901

Species of flowering plant

Ranalisma rostrata (wrong: rostratum) is a critically endangered marsh plant species, one of only two species in the Ranalisma genus of the family Alismataceae. It was first described and published by Stapf 1900. It is included in the list of China national level I key protection plants, and after the introduction of breeding programs in China the population has been increasing. Studies have shown that both volatile compounds and water extracts derived from Isodon globosa and Pogostemon praetermissum exhibit significant inhibitory effects on the seed germination of R. rostrata. These extracts also slow down primary root growth and induce morphological changes in the root system, although they do not affect bud development.
