= Albidella nymphaeifolia =

Scientific classification
- Kingdom: Plantae
- Clade: Tracheophytes
- Clade: Angiosperms
- Clade: Monocots
- Order: Alismatales
- Family: Alismataceae
- Genus: Albidella
- Species: A. nymphaeifolia

Binomial name
- Albidella nymphaeifolia (Griseb.) Pichon

Synonyms
- Alisma nymphaeifolium Griseb.; Echinodorus nymphaeifolius (Griseb.) Buchenau; Helanthium nymphaeifolium (Griseb.) Small

Genus of flowering plants

Albidella nymphaeifolia is a species of flowering plant in genus Alismataceae. It is an annual or helophyte native to Cuba and the Yucatán Peninsula (Belize, Guatemala, Campeche, Quintana Roo, and Yucatán State).

== Description ==
Leaves are variable; one plant can develop 2 - 3 stems of different types simultaneously. Submersed leaves short-petiolate, blades long, lanceolate to linear, light-green, membranously transparent, 15 – 25 cm long x 0.8 - 1.8 cm wide, obtuse at the point, decurrent to the markedly winged petiole at the base. Their margins are undulate to curled, sometimes narrowly parallel, another time the blades broaden towards the apex and are widest in the upper third showing club-shaped form. Floating or emersed leaves are 25 – 35 cm long, long-petioled, blades oval or ovate with conspicuous lobes, which touch and / or cover each other. Blades and lobes inclusively 6 – 12 cm long x 5 – 8 cm wide, the length of the central rib usually being the same as the width of the blade. In the blade there are, some distance from each other, clear, short and longer pellucid lines reaching a length of 0.2 - 0.3 mm. Sterile plants look very similar to Echinodorus berteroi.
