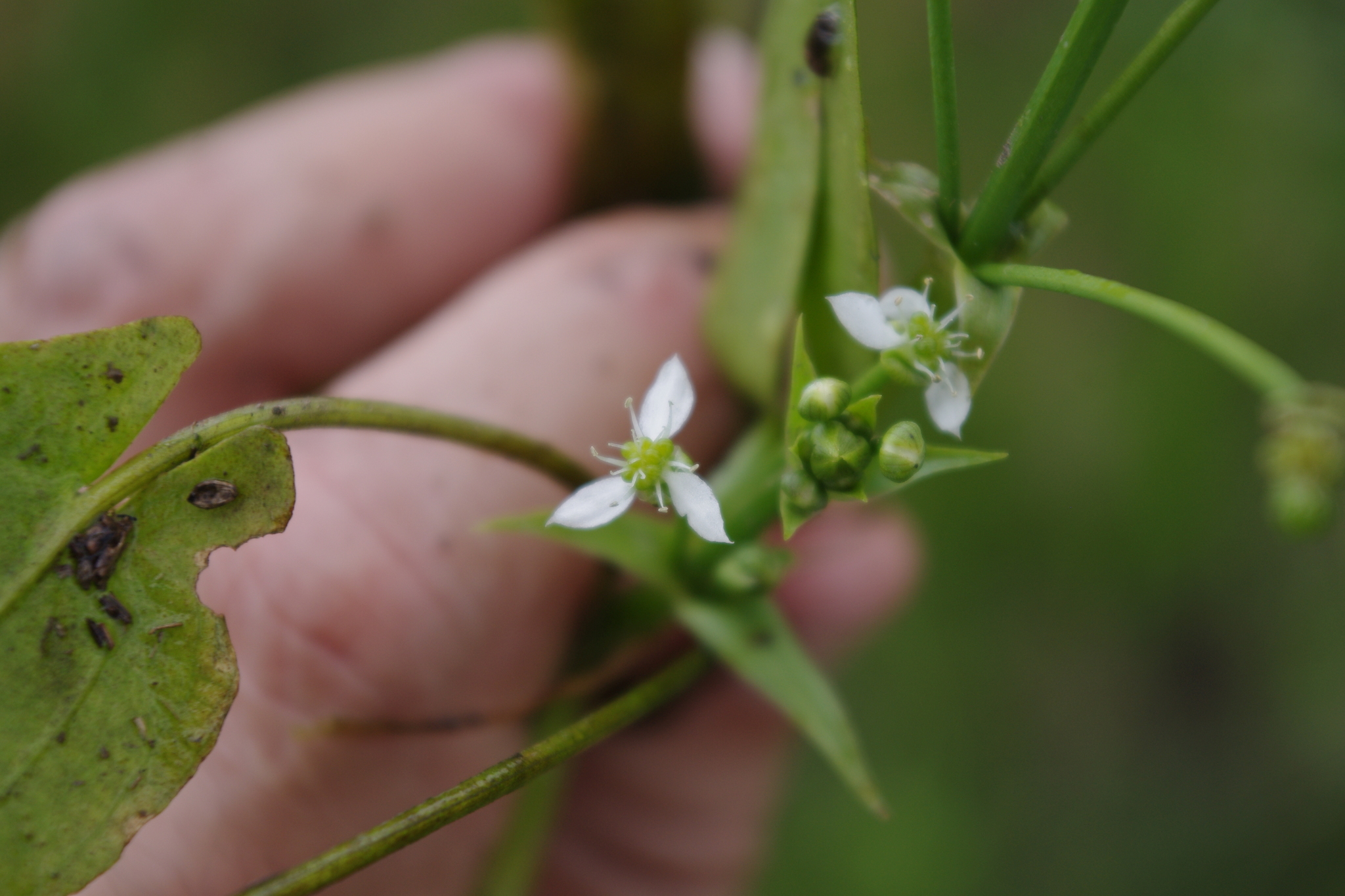
- Albidella oligococca

Scientific classification
- Kingdom: Plantae
- Clade: Tracheophytes
- Clade: Angiosperms
- Clade: Monocots
- Order: Alismatales
- Family: Alismataceae
- Genus: Albidella; Pichon

= Albidella =

Genus of flowering plants

Albidella is a genus of flowering plants in the family Alismataceae. It includes four species native to the tropics.

== Species ==
Four species are accepted.

- Albidella acanthocarpa (F.Muell.) Lehtonen
- Albidella glandulosa (Thwaites) Lehtonen
- Albidella nymphaeifolia (Griseb.) Pichon
- Albidella oligococca (F.Muell.) Lehtonen

== Etymology ==
Albidella is a taxonomic anagram derived from the name of the confamilial genus Baldellia. The latter name is a taxonomic patronym honoring the Italian nobleman Bartolommeo Bartoloni-Baldelli.

== Description ==
This genus markedly differs from Echinodorus by a typical paniculate inflorescence shaped as a regular pyramid. Flowering stalk is 40 – 50 cm tall, inflorescence up to 12 – 20 cm long, flowers arranged in 2 - 6 whorls, bracts of the lower whorl reach a length of 2.5 – 4 cm and a width of 0.5 - 0.8 cm, bracts in further whorls being only 2 – 5 mm long. Corolla white, stamens usually 9. Compound fruit comprises maximum 20 achenes, each 1.4 - 1.6 mm long x 1 mm wide with a broad crested keel and with crested ribs and 1 or 2 long glands on each face, beak 0.2 mm long.
