= Bassenhally Pit =

Biological Site of Special Scientific Interest in Cambridgeshire, England

Coordinates: 52.569°N 0.104°W

- Site of Special Scientific Interest
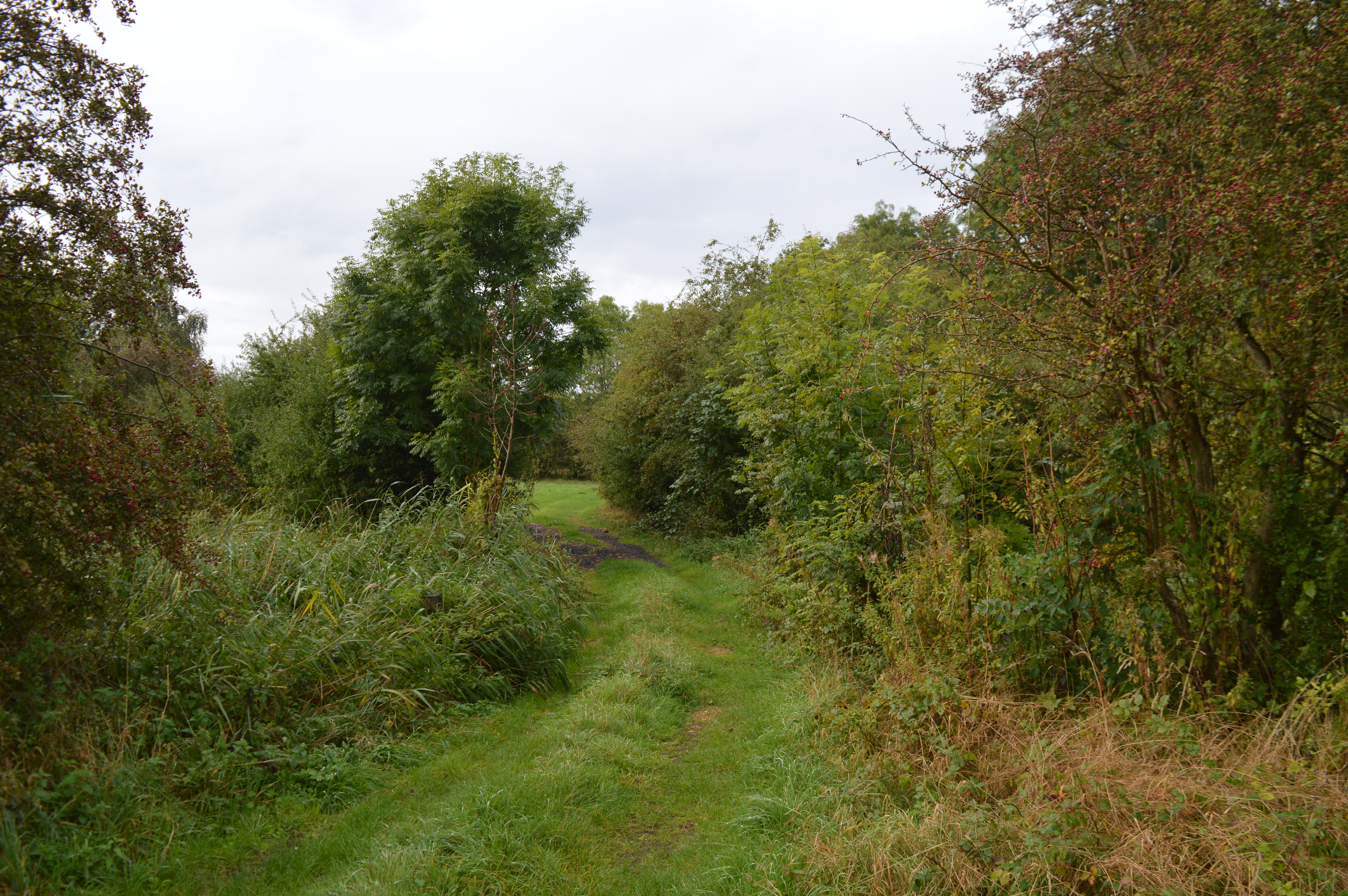
- Location of Bassenhally Pit.
- Area of search: Cambridgeshire
- Grid reference: TL 286 985
- Interest: Biological
- Area: 8.6 hectares
- Notification date: 1984
- Location map: Magic Map

Bassenhally Pit is an 8.6-hectare (21-acre) biological Site of Special Scientific Interest north-east of Whittlesey in Cambridgeshire.

This former gravel quarry has diverse habitats, such as a pond, marshes, grassland, scrub and woodland. The marsh is a nationally scarce habitat, and it has plants including jointed rush, creeping bent, lesser water-plantain, early marsh-orchid and water violet.

The site is owned by the Whittlesey Wildfowlers and Conservationists, and there is no public access.
