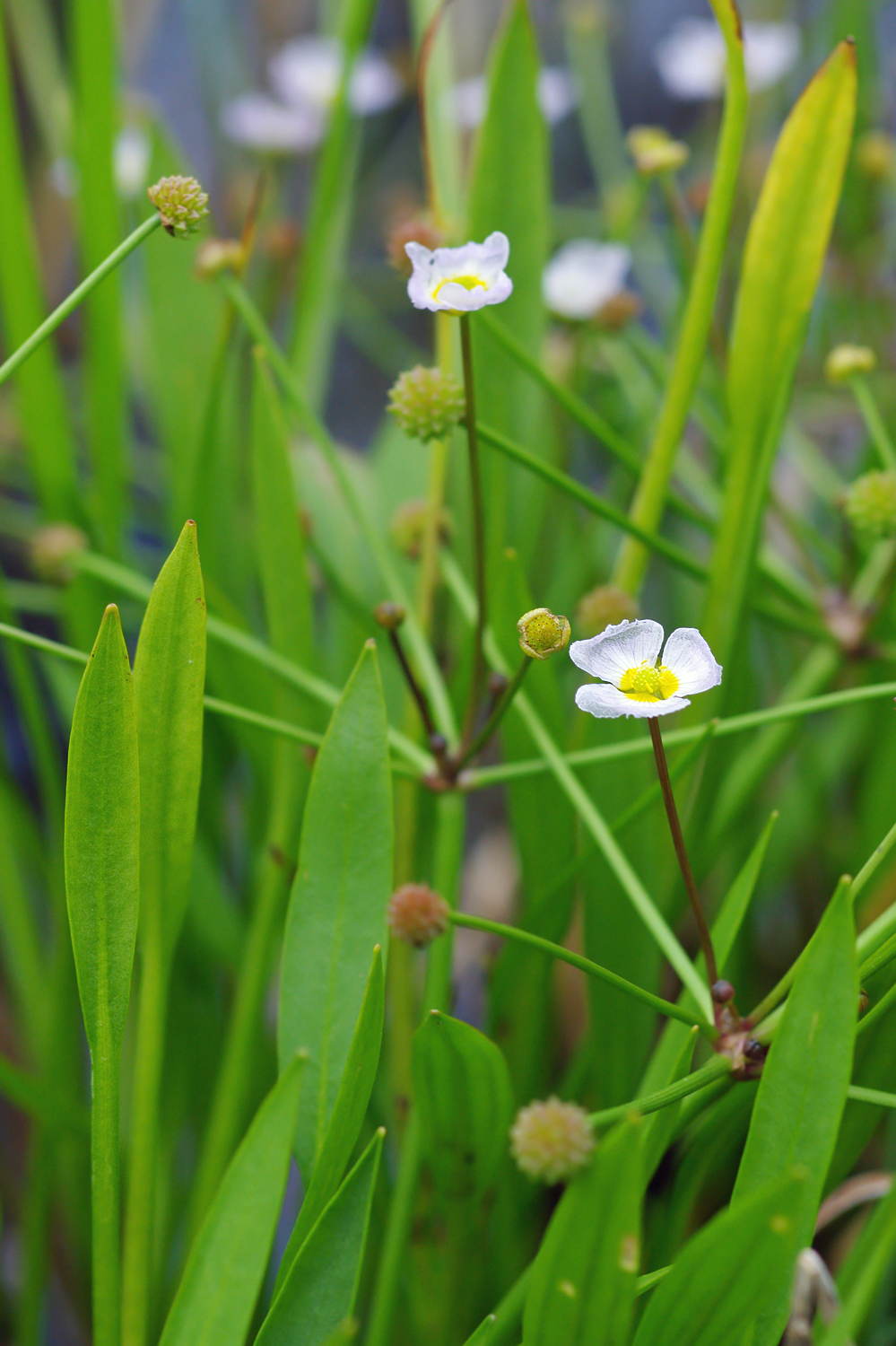

Conservation status
- Near Threatened (IUCN 3.1)

Scientific classification
- Kingdom: Plantae
- Clade: Tracheophytes
- Clade: Angiosperms
- Clade: Monocots
- Order: Alismatales
- Family: Alismataceae
- Genus: Baldellia
- Species: B. ranunculoides

Binomial name
- Baldellia ranunculoides (L.) Parl.

Synonyms
- Alisma ranunculoides L.; Echinodorus ranunculoides (L.) Engelm. ex Asch.

= Baldellia ranunculoides =

Lesser water-plantain

Species of aquatic plant

Baldellia ranunculoides, the lesser water-plantain, is a species of flowering plant in the family Alismataceae.

== Synonyms ==
Alisma ranunculoides, Echinodorus ranunculoides, Sagittaria ranunculodes

== Description ==
Baldellia ranunculoides is an aquatic plant which produced erect flowering stems that rise up to 10 centimetres (4 in) above the water surface. Each flower stalk bears one or two umbels of up to five flowers each, and often only a single flower. Each flower is 10–15 millimetres (0.4–0.6 in) in diameter, and has three petals. When not in flower, B. ranunculoides can be mistaken for lesser spearwort, Ranunculus flammula, which grows in similar locations.

== Distribution ==
Baldellia ranunculoides is found along the Atlantic and Baltic coast of western and northern Europe, and along the Mediterranean coasts of southern Europe, Turkey and North Africa. Recently found in eastern Newfoundland, Bristol's Hope barachois, Avalon Peninsula, the only location in North America. May have been introduced by a float (Sarracenia magazine, Newfoundland and Labrador Wildflower Society.
