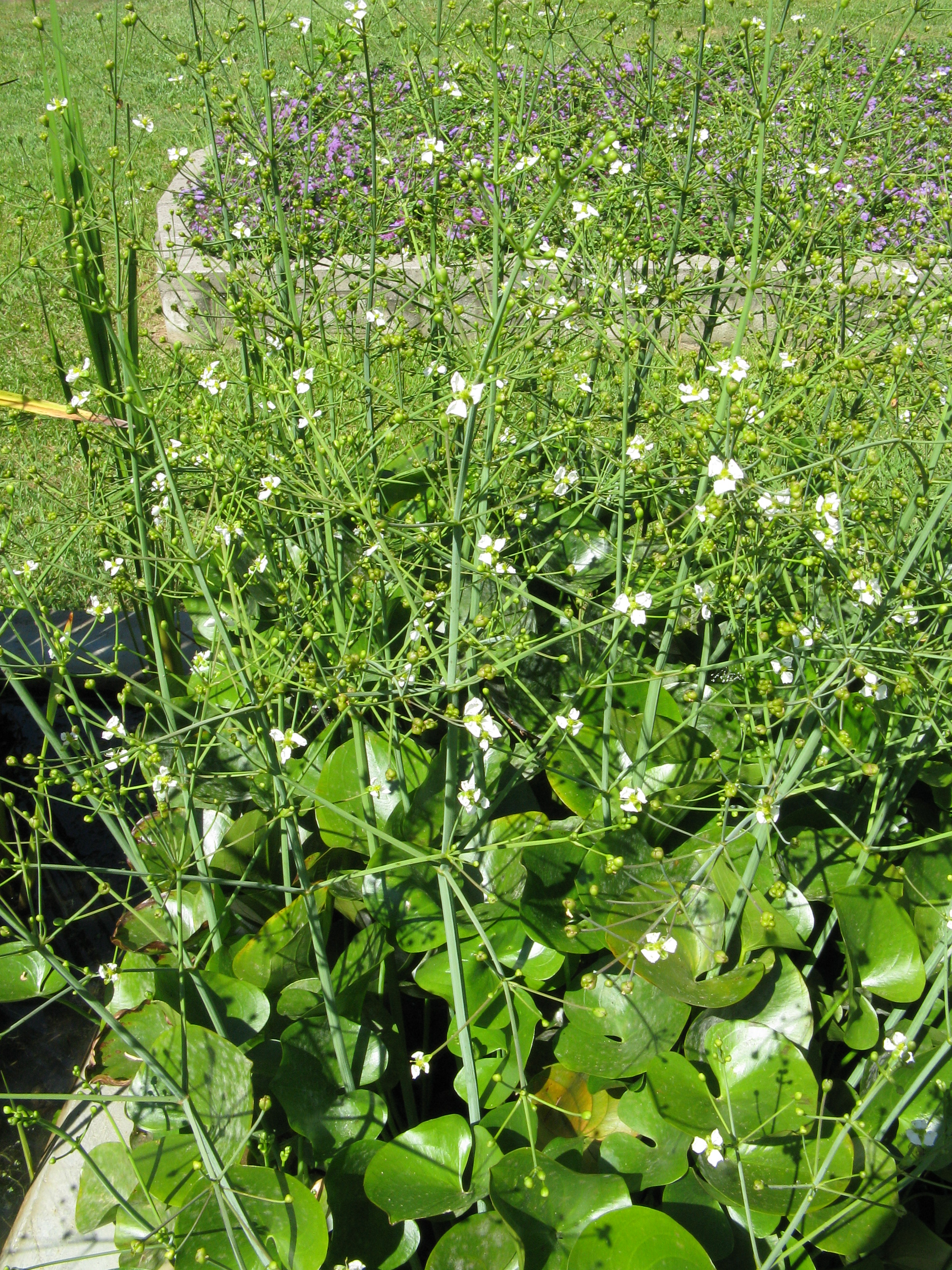
- Caldesia parnassifolia

Scientific classification
- Kingdom: Plantae
- Clade: Tracheophytes
- Clade: Angiosperms
- Clade: Monocots
- Order: Alismatales
- Family: Alismataceae
- Genus: Caldesia; Parl.

Species
- See text

= Caldesia =

Genus of aquatic plants

Caldesia is a genus of aquatic plants. It includes three living species widespread across Europe, Asia, Africa and Australia. The genus "has an extensive Oligocene through Pleistocene fossil record in Eurasia," and has been found in fossil strata of the United States (Idaho and Vermont) as well. Ten fossil species have been described for the genus.

== Taxonomy ==
The genus name of Caldesia is in honour of Ludovico (Luigi) Caldesi (1821 - 1884), an Italian politician and botanist.

The genus was circumscribed by Filippo Parlatore in Fl. Ital. Vol.3 on page 598 in 1860.

== Description ==
Leaves all basal, floating or aerial, ovate to elliptical, cordate or subcordate. Flowers hermaphrodite, in racemes or panicles. Stamens 6(-11). Carpels few or numerous in a single whorl, free, each with 1 ovule; styles subventral. Fruitlets drupaceous, with woody endocarp and spongy exocarp, swollen, with a short subventral beak, smooth or with tubercles or spines.

== Selected species ==
- Caldesia brandoniana †
- Caldesia grandis Sam. - Assam, Bangladesh, southern China
- Caldesia oligococca (F.Muell.) Buchanan
  - Caldesia oligococca var. acanthocarpa (F.Muell.) Hartog - Queensland, Northern Territory (of Australia)
  - Caldesia oligococca var. echinata Hartog - western Africa from Mali to Chad, plus India, Pakistan, Sri Lanka, Thailand, Vietnam, Java
  - Caldesia oligococca var. oligococca - Timor, Queensland
- Caldesia parnassifolia (L.) Parl. (synonym: Caldesia reniformis (D.Don) Makino) - widespread across Europe, Asia, Africa, Queensland
