= Helanthium zombiense =

Scientific classification
- Kingdom: Plantae
- Clade: Tracheophytes
- Clade: Angiosperms
- Clade: Monocots
- Order: Alismatales
- Family: Alismataceae
- Genus: Helanthium
- Species: H. zombiense

Binomial name
- Helanthium zombiense (Jérémie) Lehtonen & Myllys

Synonyms
- Echinodorus zombiensis Jérémie

Species of aquatic plant

Helanthium zombiense is a species of plants in the Alismataceae. It is native to the islands of Jamaica and Guadeloupe in the West Indies.
