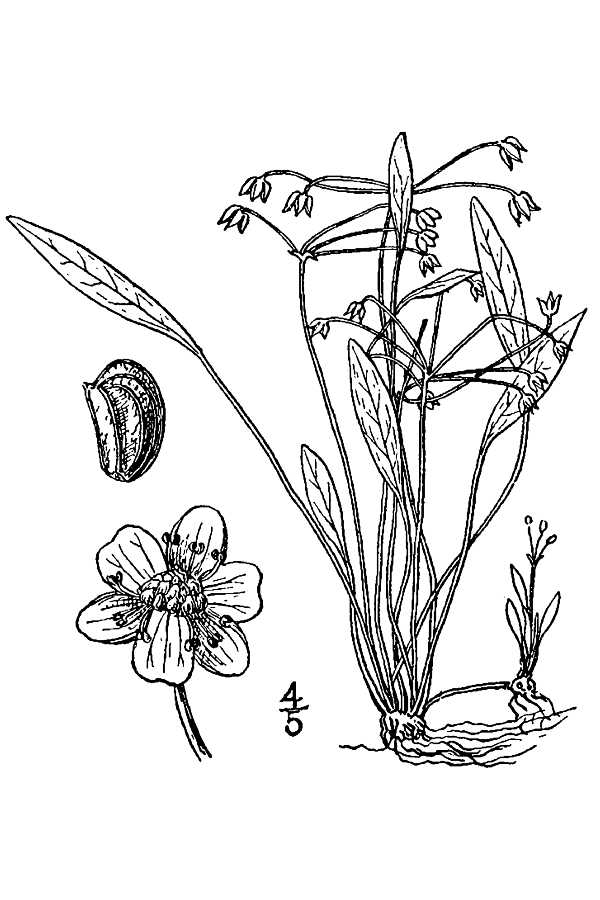

Scientific classification
- Kingdom: Plantae
- Clade: Tracheophytes
- Clade: Angiosperms
- Clade: Monocots
- Order: Alismatales
- Family: Alismataceae
- Genus: Helanthium
- Species: H. tenellum

Binomial name
- Helanthium tenellum (Mart. ex Schult.f.) J.G.Sm.

Synonyms
- Alisma tenellum Mart. ex Schult.f. in J.J.Roemer & J.A.Schultes; Echinodorus tenellus (Mart. ex Schult.f.) Buchenau; Sagittaria tenella (Mart. ex Schult.f.) Kuntze; Alisma ranunculoides var. brasiliense A.St.-Hil.; Echinodorus parvulus Engelm. in A.Gray; Echinodorus subulatus Engelm. in A.Gray; Helanthium parvulum (Engelm.) Small in N.L.Britton & al.; Echinodorus tenellus var. ecostatus Fassett; Echinodorus tenellus var. parvulus (Engelm.) Fassett; Echinodorus tenellus f. randii Fassett

= Helanthium tenellum =

Species of aquatic plant

Helanthium tenellum, the pygmy chain sword, is a species of plants in the Alismataceae. It is native to the eastern United States (from Texas to Florida, north to Michigan and Massachusetts), southern Mexico (Chiapas, Veracruz), West Indies (Cuba, Jamaica, Hispaniola), Central America, South America (from Guyana to Argentina)

== Description ==
The leaves of H. tenellum are narrowly elliptical or lanceolate. At different times during the plant's life cycle, the blade of the leaf is scarcely distinguishable from the petiole, while at other times the petiole is 10 to 15 times as long as the blade, which may be 1–4 cm long and 0.2–1 cm wide, with a pointed tip. The base is decurrent to the petiole and has between one and three veins.

The stem is thin, erect, often curved, and may be 3–20 cm long. In small plants, the stem ends in a single inflorescence (umbel or coil); in larger plants the inflorescence is racemose, composed of two whorls placed one above the other. Bracts are free and 2–6 mm long in the first whorl. Pedicels are 1–3.5 cm long. Sepals are 3 mm long, membraneous, and usually have five fine ribs. During ripening, the sepals enlarge and reach a length of up to 6 mm and fully cover the aggregate fruit. A specimen may have six to nine stamens, each about 1 mm long. Anthers are 0.25 mm wide by 2.25 mm long, which is three times shorter than the filaments. It may have sixteen to eighteen pistils. The achenes are compressed, and arched in the apical part; they are (0.9) – 1.1 – (1.3) mm long, and black, with three lateral ribs. The basis of the stylar beak is under the level of the tip of the nutlet and may be 0.1–0.3 mm long.

It propagates by sending out runners and will also flower when grown emersed.

== Conservation status in the United States ==
It is endangered in Connecticut, Illinois, Indiana, Kentucky, and Michigan.

== In the aquarium ==
Helanthium tenellum is a common aquarium plant with a large variation in shapes and sizes kept by people for their aesthetic appeal. Its care is undemanding and it can adapt to a large range of conditions.
