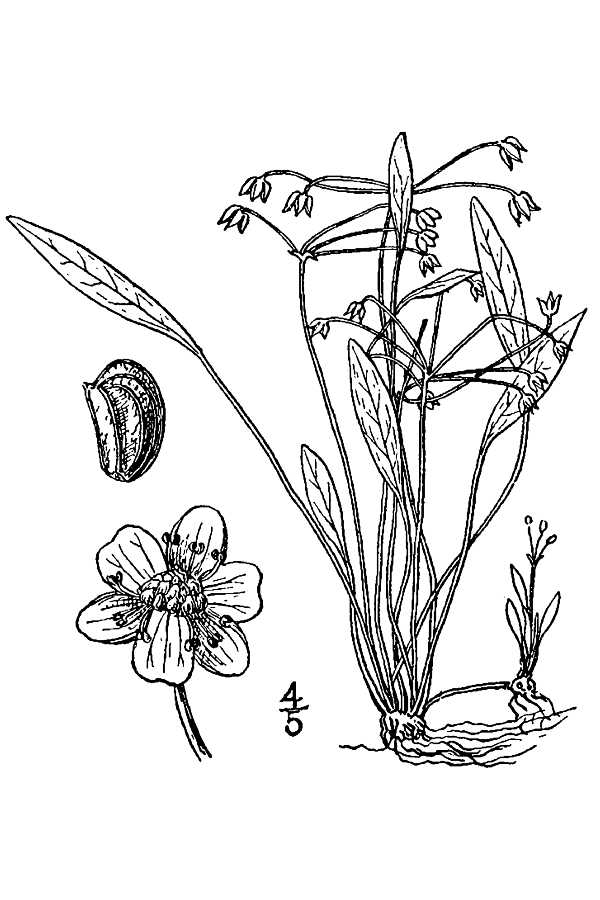

Scientific classification
- Kingdom: Plantae
- Clade: Tracheophytes
- Clade: Angiosperms
- Clade: Monocots
- Order: Alismatales
- Family: Alismataceae
- Genus: Helanthium
- Species: H. bolivianum

Binomial name
- Helanthium bolivianum (Rusby) Lehtonen & Myllys

Synonyms
- Alisma bolivianum Rusby; Echinodorus bolivianus (Rusby) Holm-Niels; Alisma tenellum f. latifolium Seub. in C.F.P.von Martius; Echinodorus isthmicus Fassett; Echinodorus magdalenensis Fassett; Echinodorus quadricostatus Fassett; Echinodorus tenellus f. apanecae Fassett; Echinodorus tenellus var. latifolius (Seub.) Fassett; Echinodorus austroamericanus Rataj; Echinodorus angustifolius Rataj; Echinodorus latifolius (Seub.) Rataj; Echinodorus quadricostatus var. magdalenensis (Fassett) Rataj; Echinodorus quadricostatus var. xinguensis Rataj; Echinodorus xinguensis (Rataj) Rataj; Echinodorus australis Rataj

= Helanthium bolivianum =

Species of aquatic plant

Helanthium bolivianum is a species of plant in the Alismataceae. It is native to southern Mexico, Central America, the West Indies and South America.
