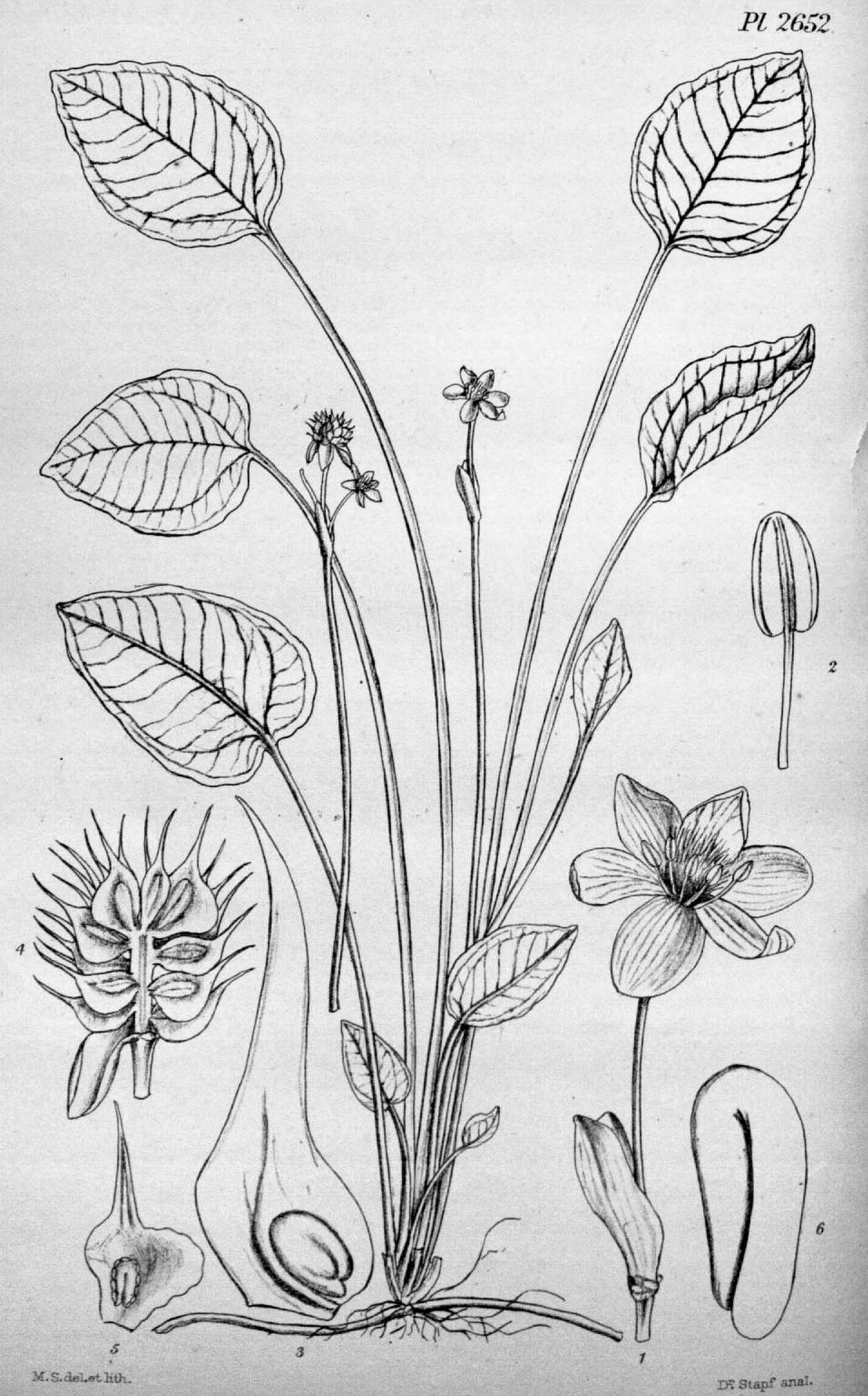
- Ranalisma rostrata

Scientific classification
- Kingdom: Plantae
- Clade: Tracheophytes
- Clade: Angiosperms
- Clade: Monocots
- Order: Alismatales
- Family: Alismataceae
- Genus: Ranalisma; Stapf

Type species
- Ranalisma rostrata Stapf

Species
- See text

= Ranalisma =

Genus of plants

Ranalisma is a genus in the family Alismataceae. It includes two species; one from tropical Africa (R. humile) and the other (R. rostrata) from southeast Asia.

Ranalisma rostrata is a critically endangered marsh species, and is included in the list of China national level I key protection plants. After the introduction of breeding programs in China the population has been increasing.

== Species ==
- Ranalisma humile (Rich. ex Kunth) Hutch. in J.Hutchinson & J.M.Dalziel - from Senegal to Tanzania, south to Zambia and Angola
- Ranalisma rostrata Stapf. - China (Hunan, Jiangxi, Zhejiang), Vietnam, Malaysia, India
