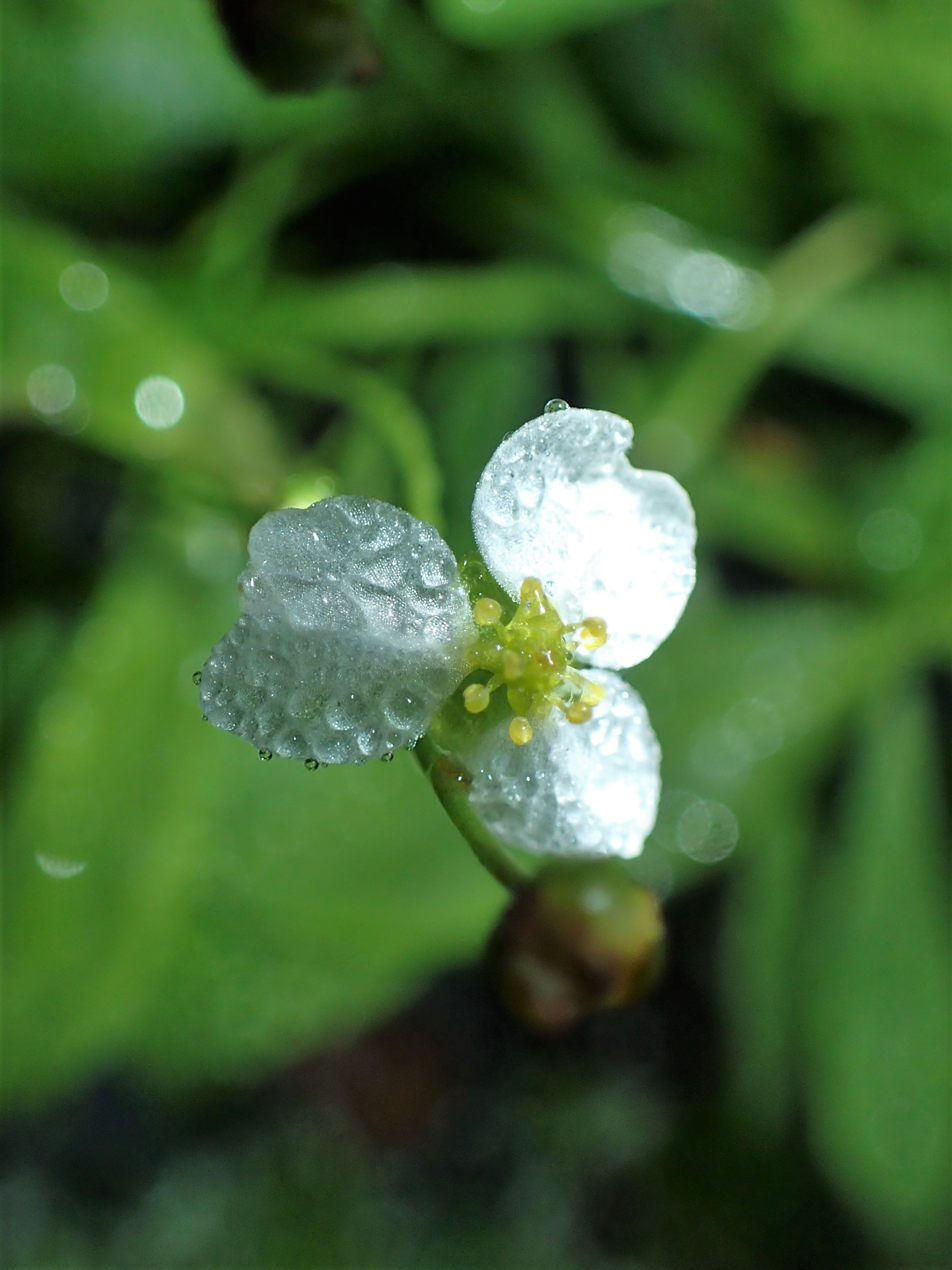
- Helanthium bolivianum

Scientific classification
- Kingdom: Plantae
- Clade: Tracheophytes
- Clade: Angiosperms
- Clade: Monocots
- Order: Alismatales
- Family: Alismataceae
- Genus: Helanthium (Benth. & Hook.f.) Engelm. ex J.G.Sm.

Type species
- Helanthium tenellum (Mart. ex Schult. & Schult. f.) Britton.

Species
- See text

= Helanthium =

Genus of aquatic plants

Helanthium is a genus of plants in the Alismataceae, native to the Western Hemisphere. At present (May 2014), three species are recognized:

- Helanthium bolivianum (Rusby) Lehtonen & Myllys - southern Mexico, West Indies, Central America, South America
- Helanthium tenellum (Mart. ex Schult.f.) J.G.Sm. in N.L.Britton - eastern United States (from Texas to Florida, north to Michigan and Massachusetts), southern Mexico, West Indies, Central America, South America
- Helanthium zombiense (Jérémie) Lehtonen & Myllys - Jamaica, Island of Guadeloupe
