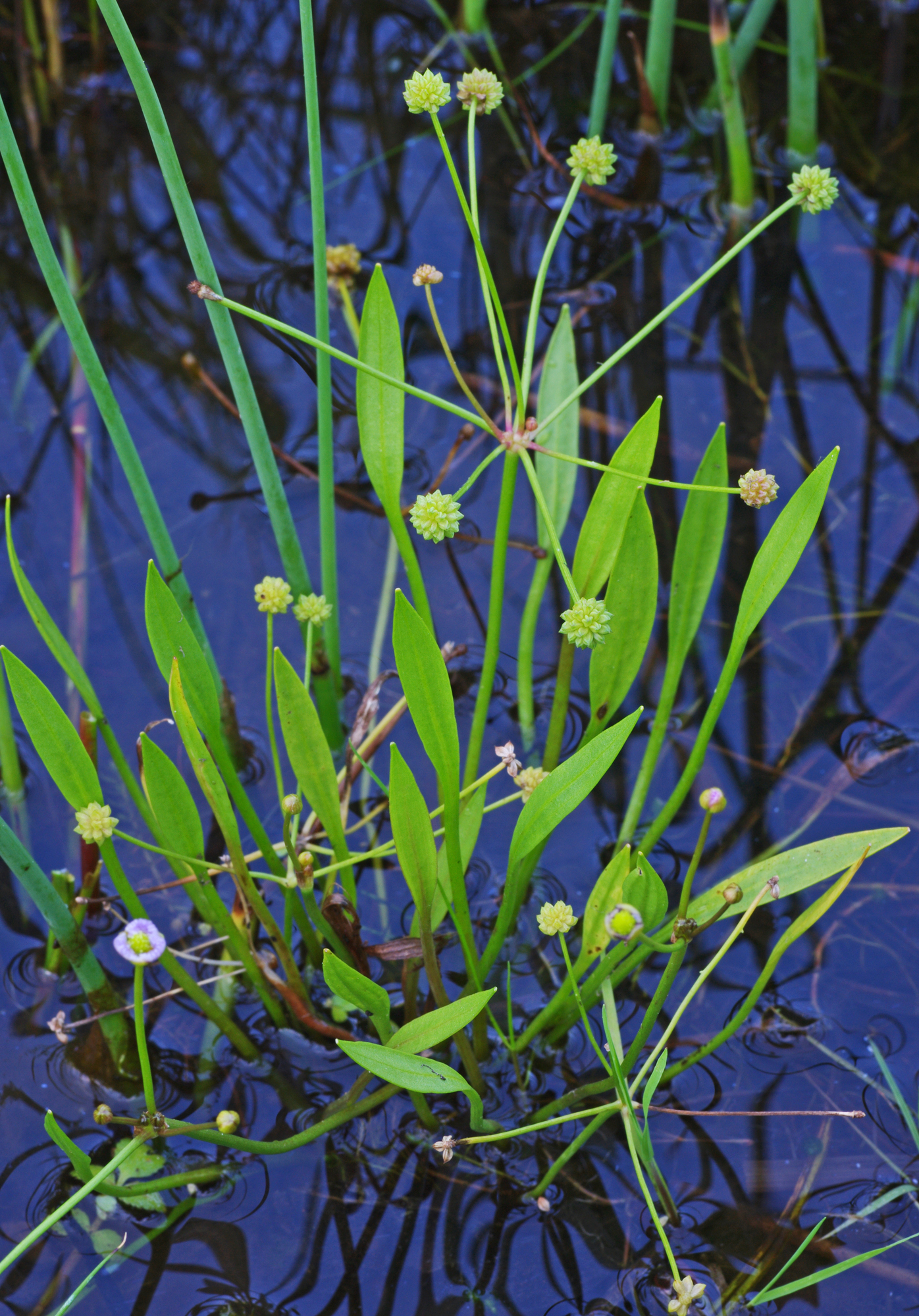
- Baldellia ranunculoides

Scientific classification
- Kingdom: Plantae
- Clade: Tracheophytes
- Clade: Angiosperms
- Clade: Monocots
- Order: Alismatales
- Family: Alismataceae
- Genus: Baldellia; Parl.

Species
- See text

= Baldellia =

Genus of flowering plants in the water-plantain family Alismataceae

Baldellia is a genus of aquatic plants commonly known as lesser water-plantains. It includes three species found across much of Europe and the Mediterranean from Ireland and the Canary Islands to Turkey and Estonia. The genus is named in honor of the Italian nobleman Bartolommeo Bartolini-Baldelli. Baldellia is very closely related to Echinodorus.

== Description ==
Leaves aerial, elliptical to lanceolate or linear-lanceolate. Flowers hermaphrodite, in 1 – 3 whorls in umbels or racemes, or long-pedunculate in leaf-axils. Stamens 6. Carpels numerous, spirally arranged in a globose head, free, each with 1 ovule; styles apical. Fruitlets achenial, longitudinally 5-ribbed (3 dorsal ribs and 2 closely approximated ventral ribs), with a short, apical beak. 2n=16.

Variable in form according to ecological conditions.

== Species ==
Three species are recognized:

- Baldellia alpestris (Cosson) Vasc. – northwestern Spain and northern Portugal
- Baldellia ranunculoides (L.) Parl.
  - Baldellia ranunculoides var ranunculoides – from the Azores and Ireland to Turkey and Estonia
  - Baldellia ranunculoides var. tangerina (Pau) J.Rocha – Spain, Portugal, Morocco
- Baldellia repens (Lam.) Ooststr
  - Baldellia repens subsp. baetica Talavera & Casimiro-Soriguer – southwestern Spain
  - Baldellia repens subsp. cavanillesii (Molina Abril, A.Galán, J.M.Pizarro & Sard.Rosc.) Talavera – Spain, Portugal, France, Belgium, Netherlands
  - Baldellia repens subsp. repens – Canaries, Spain, Portugal, Algeria
