= Parlatoria cakiloidea =

Scientific classification
- Kingdom: Plantae
- Clade: Tracheophytes
- Clade: Angiosperms
- Clade: Eudicots
- Clade: Rosids
- Order: Brassicales
- Family: Brassicaceae
- Genus: Parlatoria; Boiss.
- Species: P. cakiloidea

Binomial name
- Parlatoria cakiloidea Boiss.

Species of flowering plant

Parlatoria is a monotypic genus of flowering plants belonging to the family Brassicaceae. It just contains one species, Parlatoria cakiloidea Boiss.

== Description ==
It is an annual, growing up 30–50 cm (12–20 in) tall, with a stem that is glabrous (smooth) or with short simple hairs. It has basal leaves that are ovate-cordate shaped, with acute teeth. The cauline (stem) leaves are petiolate (have a leaf stalk) or subsessile. They are ovate-lanceolate shaped with acute teeth on margin. The leaves when crushed smell of garlic. It blooms between April and May, with long white flowers. The petals are 4-5 mm long and 1.5-2 mm wide with a broad oblong-obovate blade and narrow claw (section near the stem or petiole). The fruiting pedicels (flower stalks) are as thick as basal part of fruit and 3-7 mm horizontally spreading. The fruit (or seed capsule) is 10-15 mm long and 2-2.5 mm wide with straight or slightly curved beak (end projection). It contain 1 or 2 seeds, that are 5 mm long.

== Taxonomy ==
The genus Parlatoria originally consisted of three species, including P. cakiloidea, the type species (Iran, Iraq, Turkey), the Iranian endemic P. rostrata Boiss., and P. taurica (from Azerbaijan, Georgia). Parlatoria taurica was later found to be a synonym of Alliaria taurica (Adams) V.I.Dorof. Also Parlatoria rostrata Boiss. & Hohen. was worked out to be a synonym of Lysakia rostrata (Boiss. & Hohen.) Esmailbegi & Al-Shehbaz

The genus name of Parlatoria is in honour of Filippo Parlatore (1816–1877), an Italian botanist, who originally studied medicine. The Latin specific epithet of cakiloidea refers to a resemblance to the genus Cakile. Both the genus and the species were first described and published in Ann. Sci. Nat., Bot., séries 2, Vol.17 on page 72 in 1842.

== Range and habitat ==
It is native to Iran, Iraq, Lebanon, Syria and Turkey.

It is found on rocky slopes at altitudes of 1,200 metres (3,900 ft) above sea level.

== Other sources ==
- Al-Shehbaz, I.A. 2012. A generic and tribal synopsis of Brassicaceae (Cruciferae). Taxon 61(5): 931–954. DOI: 10.1002/tax.615002 JSTOR Reference page. lecotypification of Parlatoria taurica
- Blakelock, R. A. 1955. Notes on the Flora of 'Iraq with Keys: Part II. Kew Bulletin, Vol. 10, No. 4 (), pp. 497-565
- Esmailbegi, S., Al-Shehbaz, I.A., Pouch, M., Mandáková, T., Mummenhoff, K., Rahiminejad, M.R., Mirtadzadini, S.M. & Lysak, M.A. 2018. Phylogeny and systematics of the tribe Thlaspideae (Brassicaceae) and the recognition of two new genera. Taxon 67(2): 324–340. DOI: 10.12705/672.4 PDF Reference page.
