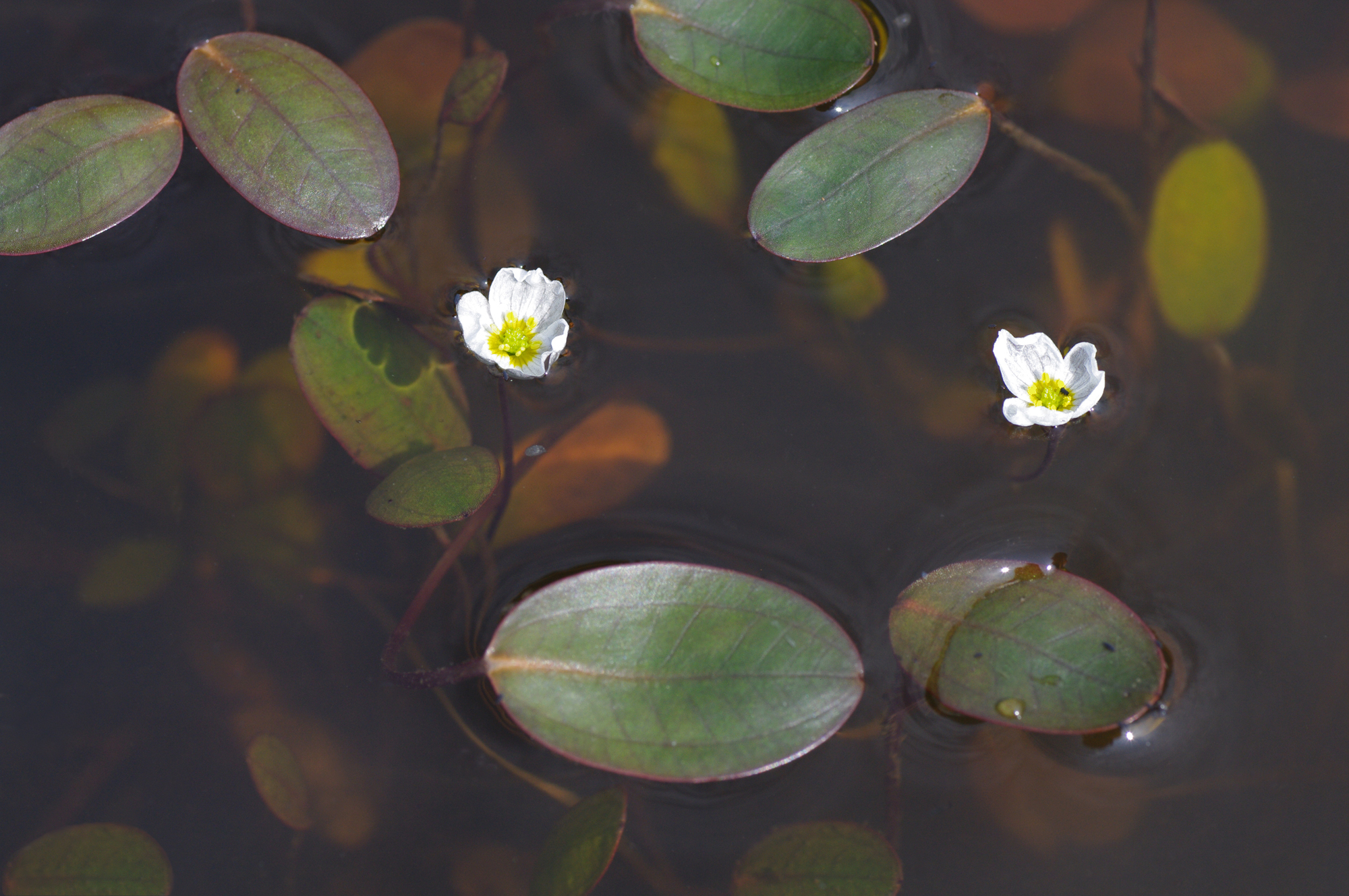

Conservation status
- Least Concern (IUCN 3.1)

Scientific classification
- Kingdom: Plantae
- Clade: Embryophytes
- Clade: Tracheophytes
- Clade: Angiosperms
- Clade: Monocots
- Order: Alismatales
- Family: Alismataceae
- Genus: Luronium; Raf.
- Species: L. natans

Binomial name
- Luronium natans (L.) Raf.

Synonyms
- Alisma natans L.; Elisma natans (L.) Buchenau; Echinodorus natans (L.) Engelm. in P.F.A.Ascherson; Nectalisma natans (L.) Fourr.; Alisma diversifolium Gilib.; Alisma natans var. sparganiifolium Fr.

= Luronium =

Species of plant

Luronium natans is a species of aquatic plant commonly known as the floating water-plantain. It is the only recognized species in the genus Luronium, native to western and central Europe, from Spain to Britain to Norway east to Ukraine.

== Description ==
Stems elongated, rising in the water or creeping and rooting at the nodes. Submerged leaves (if present) basal, linear, floating or aerial leaves elliptical to ovate. Flowers hermaphrodite, long-pedunculate in the axils of the floating or aerial leaves. Stamens 6. Carpels 6–15 in an irregular whorl, free, each with 1 ovule; styles apical. Fruitlets achenial, longitudinally many-ribbed, with a short apical beak. 2n = 42.

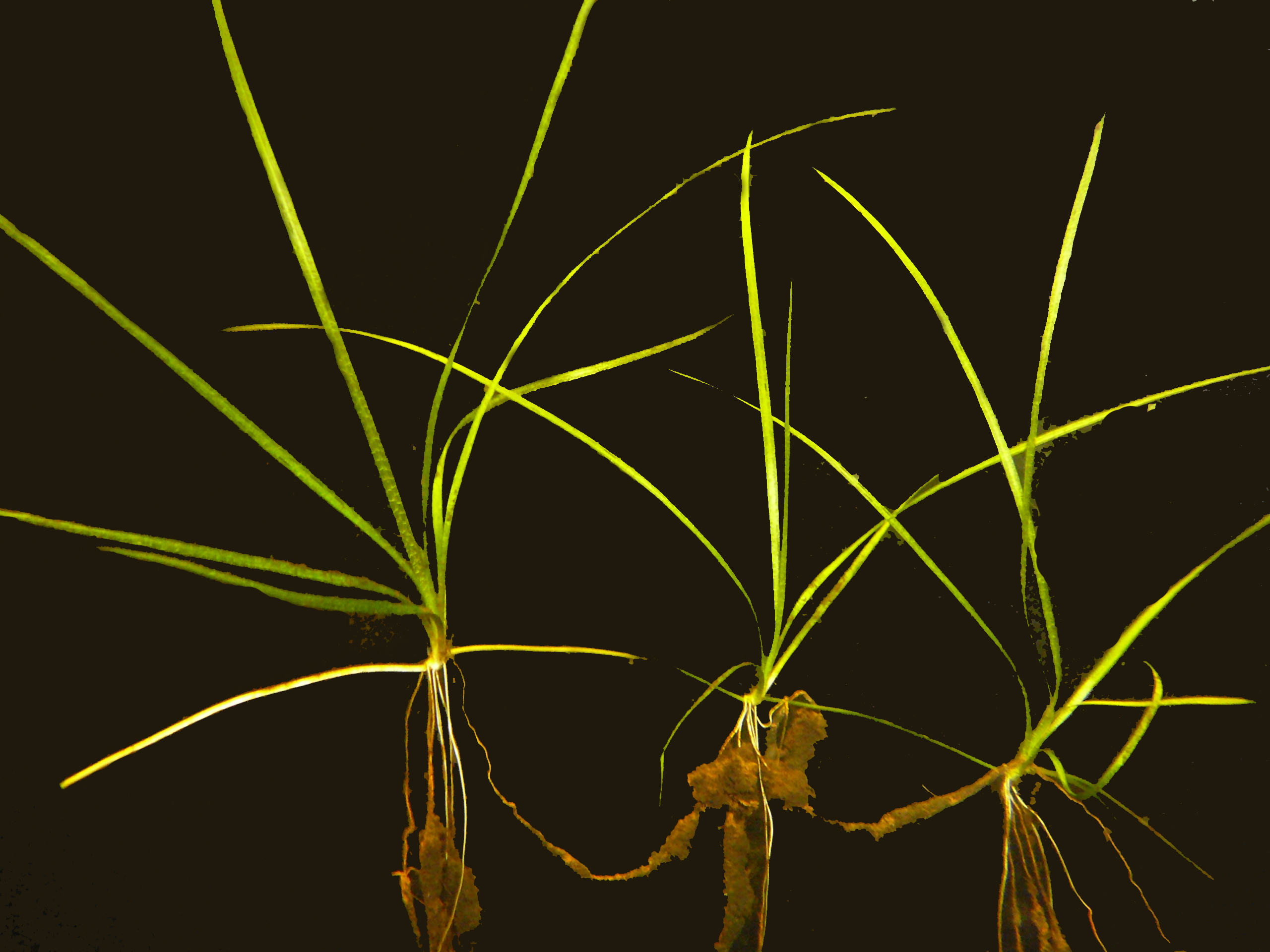
Floating water plantain Luronium natans showing stoloniferous habit

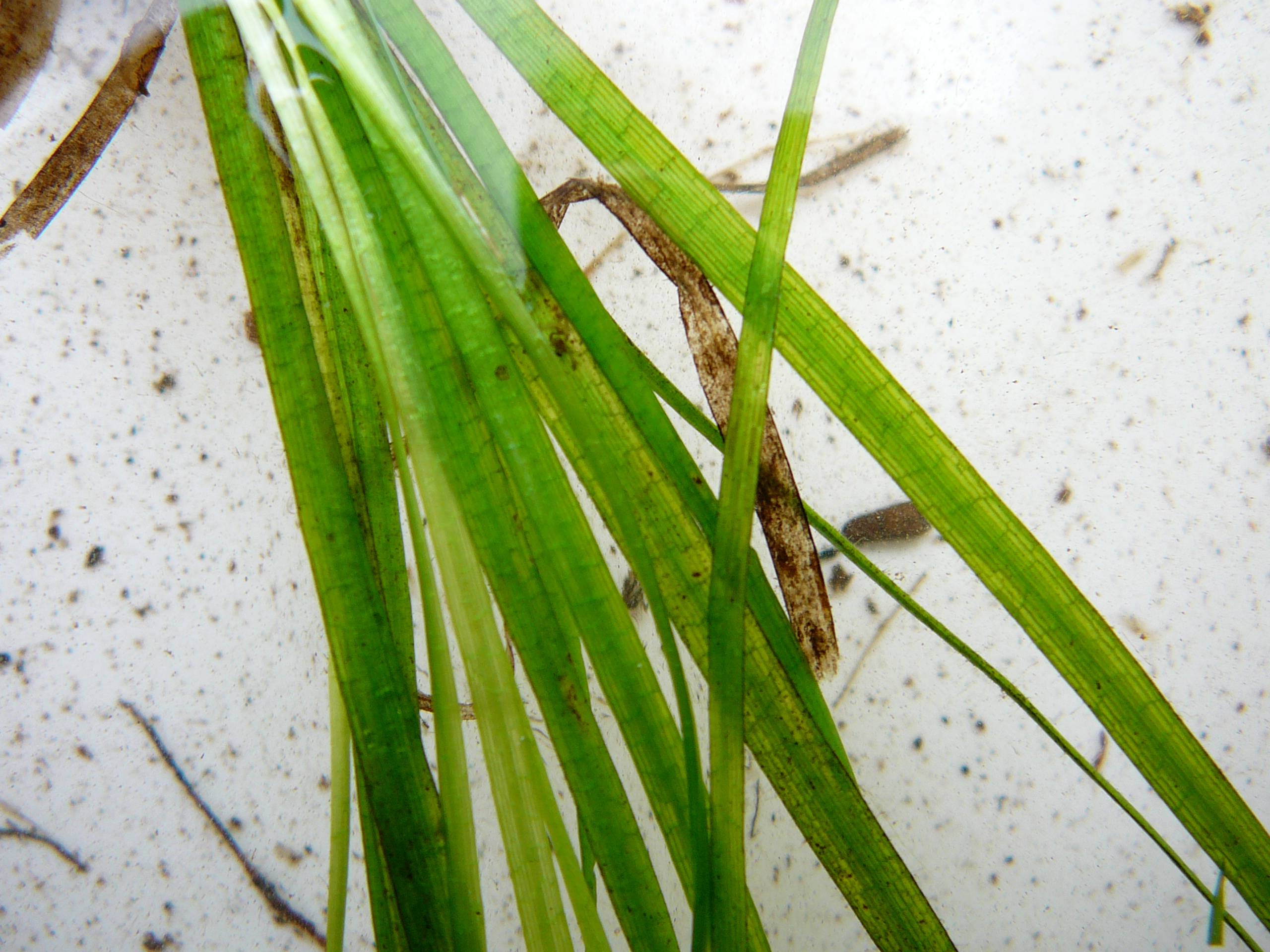
Characteristic 'ladder' venation pattern of submerged leaves.

Luronium natans can be a difficult plant to identify. It is both very variable and resembles many other aquatic plants with strap-like leaves such as bur-reeds (Sparganium), young water-plantain plants (Alisma), arrowheads (Sagittaria), lesser water-plantain (Baldellia) and mudwort (Limosella aquatica). The stoloniferous habit is an important distinguishing feature, and the unusual shape of the floating leaves, which are rounded at the tips and tend to taper gradually into the stem, is also helpful. However, floating leaves are not always present, especially in lake populations. Submerged leaves have a characteristic ladder pattern with whitish flecks when seen underwater.

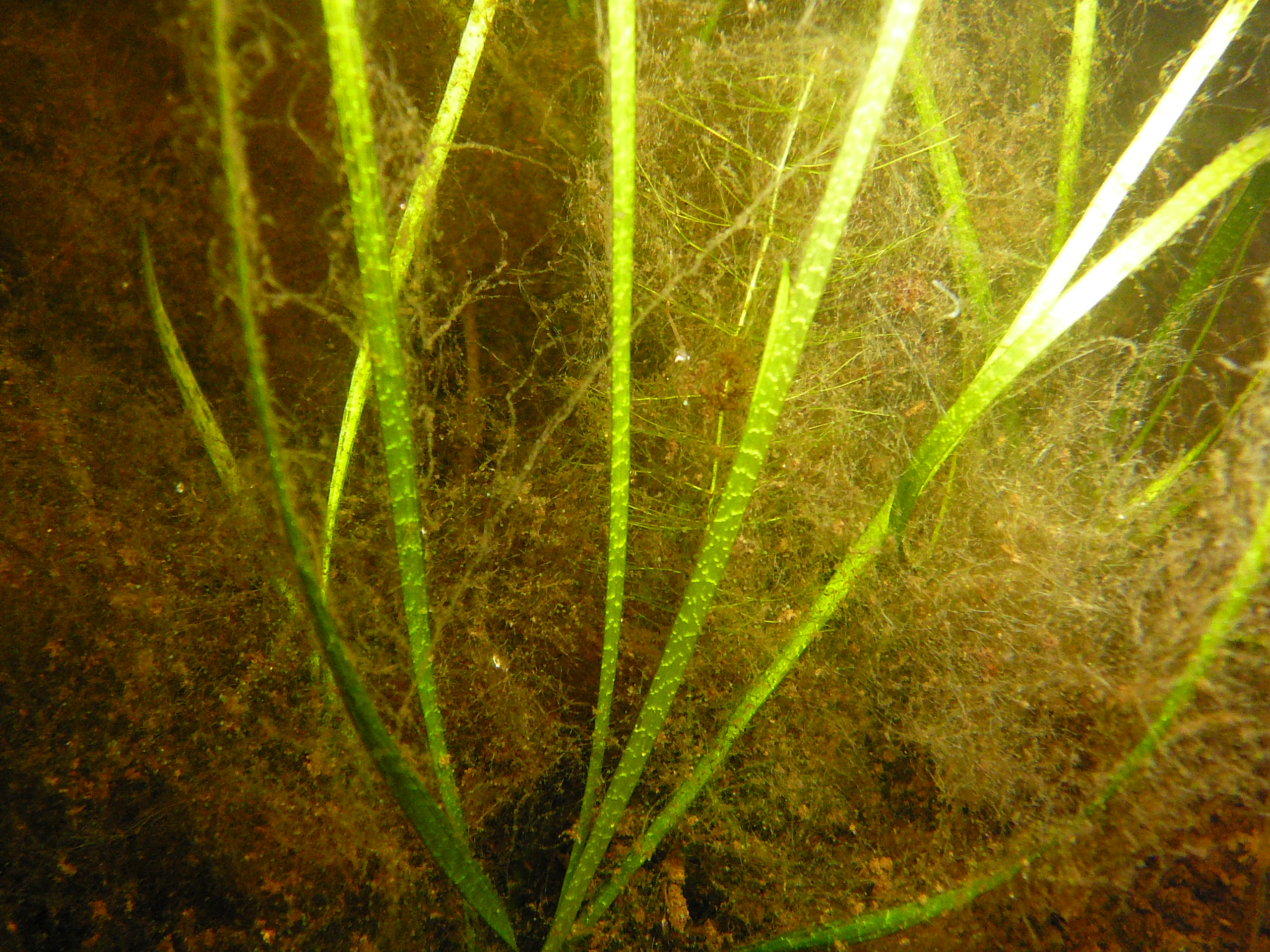
Floating water-plantain showing whitish flecks on leaves visible underwater. Llyn Hir, Ceredigion, Wales, UK.

== Distribution ==
The range of floating water-plantain is uncertain. It is widely distributed in western and central Europe, with confirmed records from Belgium, Denmark, France, Germany, the Netherlands, Poland, Republic of Ireland and the United Kingdom. It is also present but rare in northern Spain, the Czech Republic, Norway and Sweden.

Further east the distribution is much more uncertain and requires verification. Records from Bulgaria, Italy, Bosnia-Herzegovina, Croatia, Hungary, Lithuania, Macedonia, Montenegro, Romania, Russia, Serbia, Slovakia, Slovenia, Austria, the Transcarpathian region of Ukraine and Transylvania either are doubtful or are unconfirmed.

== Ecology ==
Floating water-plantain grows predominantly in base-poor lakes, ponds and slow-flowing rivers with low to moderate nutrient levels, although in some cases it appears able to tolerate alkaline systems and high nutrient levels. It has proved able to colonise certain man-made freshwater systems, especially canals.

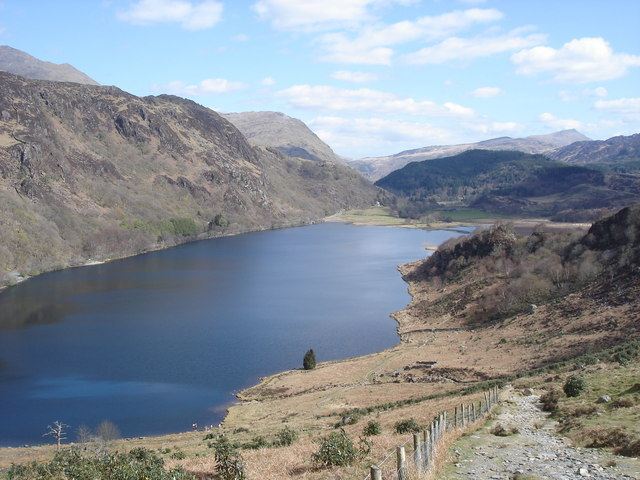
Llyn Dinas, a low nutrient base-poor shallow lake on the edge of Snowdonia National Park supports a strong population of Luronium natans

=== Lakes ===
Lake populations predominantly occur on silty or peaty substrates, growing at depths up to at least 3.5 metres (11 ft). In deeper water it reproduces vegetatively by stolons or production of cleistogamous seed. This often results in populations with low genetic diversity. Shallow water populations produce short-lived flowers which may cross-pollinate.

Floating water-plantain favours a certain amount of disturbance to survive, as it is a poor competitor. In Llyn Egnant and Llyn Teifi (Wales, UK), which are used as reservoirs for public water supply, floating water-plantain probably benefits from the resulting increase in water level fluctuation, suppressing competition from other aquatic plants and promoting flowering. However, in sites where water level fluctuations are larger in amplitude, L. natans is absent. Lake populations of this plant are strongly associated with soft-water conditions and low nutrient concentrations.

=== Rivers ===
In Britain, floating water-plantain is rare in river habitats. River populations in general occur in slow-flowing, low-gradient sections of base-poor rivers along with aquatic plants such as intermediate water-starwort Callitriche hamulata, bog pondweed Potamogeton polygonifolius and shoreweed Littorella uniflora. These populations are small and usually associated with upstream lakes that may act as sources of propagules. Riverine populations in France and Denmark are associated with natural river-floodplain systems where new oxbow lakes are constantly being created by erosion and deposition.

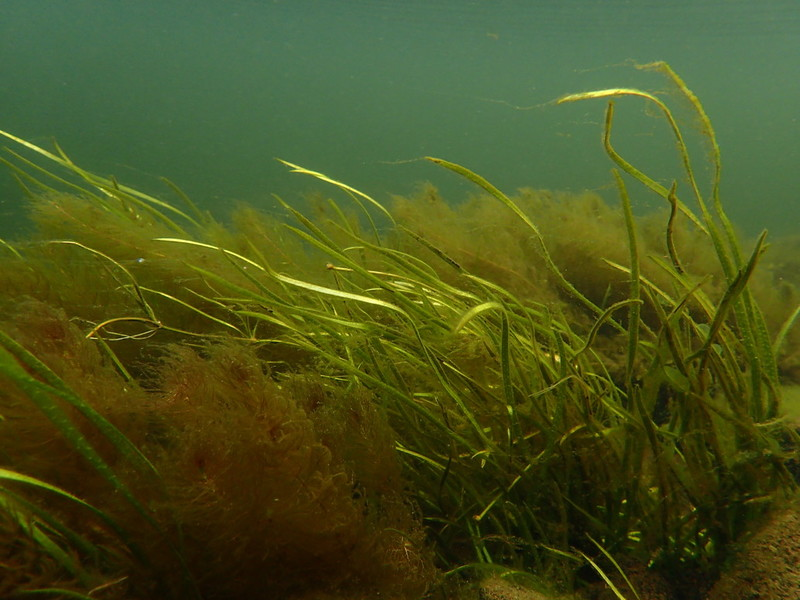
Floating water-plantain (Luronium natans), Afon Gwyrfai a Llyn Cwellyn Special Area of Conservation, Snowdonia, Wales, UK.

=== Ponds ===
The ecology of floating water-plantain in ponds is not well understood, but generally it seems to require broadly low nutrient, soft water situations with some disturbance, such as lowland heathland pools subject to grazing by livestock.

=== Artificial habitats ===
In the past, floating water-plantain has proved successful at exploiting certain types of artificial habitats, notably the British canal system and the Dombes traditional fishpond system in France. Both these systems have in common a moderate level of disturbance which helps to suppress competing species that might otherwise exclude it.

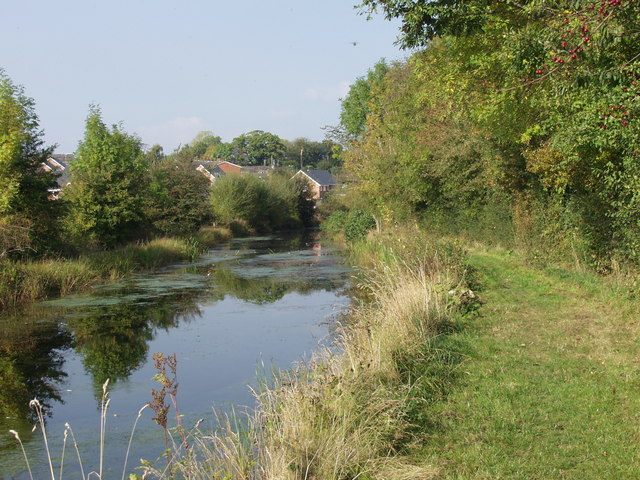
The Montgomery Canal in Britain has been widely colonized by floating water-plantain and is now a protected area for it. Regular desilting and cutting is required to restrict competition from more vigorous plants.

== Conservation, threats and restoration ==
Within Europe, floating water-plantain is listed under Annexes II and IV of the Habitats Directive and Appendix I of the Bern Convention. Within Britain it is on Schedule 4 of the Conservation (Natural Habitats, etc.) Regulations 1994; Schedule 8 of the Wildlife and Countryside Act, 1981, and on the IUCN Red List it is classified as 'Least Concern'(LC).

Floating water-plantain seems quite tolerant of acidification, as evidenced by its relative abundance in several Welsh lakes that have suffered severe declines in pH due to acid rain, and also seems able to tolerate moderate water level fluctuation as is seen when certain lakes were converted to reservoirs. Losses have mainly been associated with nutrient enrichment (eutrophication), such as in the Shropshire-Cheshire meres.

In the Netherlands, restoration of floating water-plantain and other threatened freshwater plants has been successfully achieved by removing the organic sediment layer and reducing inputs of calcium-rich surface water.

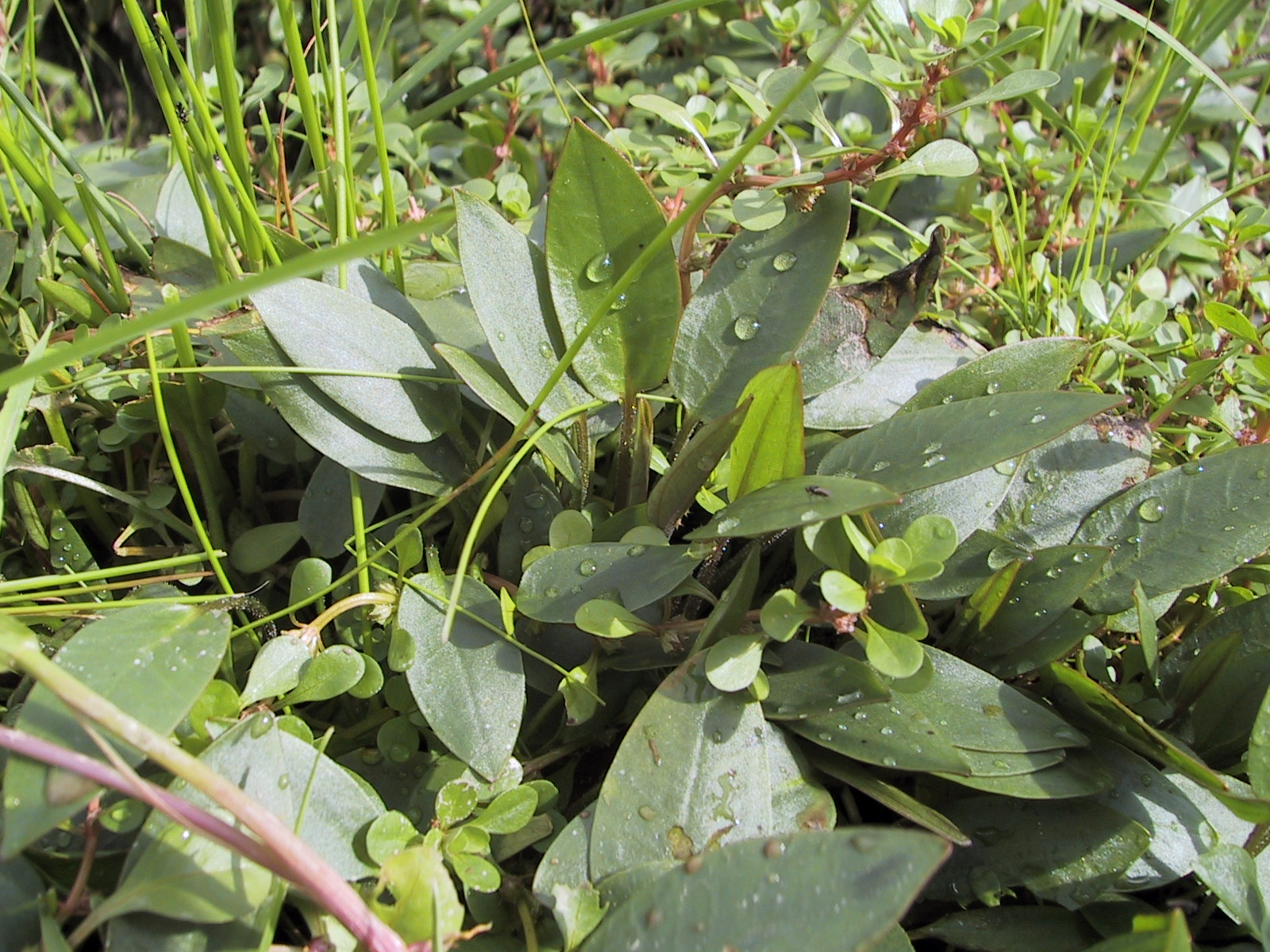
Terrestrial rosette of Luronium natans at Brown Moss in Shropshire in 2003

== Cultural ==
In 2009 it featured on a first class Royal Mail stamp in the series "Endangered Plants".It is said to have "spread eastwards from its core natural habitats in the lakes of Snowdonia and mid Wales in the 19th century, taking advantage of the canal network. In recent decades, however, pollution and recreational boating have led to its disappearance from many lowland waterways".
