= Sagisma =

Sagisma Temporal range: Oligocene–Miocene

Scientific classification
- Kingdom: Plantae
- Clade: Tracheophytes
- Clade: Angiosperms
- Clade: Monocots
- Order: Alismatales
- Family: Alismataceae
- Genus: †Sagisma; Nikitin

Species
- See text.

Extinct genus of aquatic plants

Sagisma is a fossil genus of aquatic plants. It includes two species distributed in Oligocene and Miocene deposits of western Siberia.

- † Sagisma turgida Nikitin
- † Sagisma turgidum Nikitin
