= Alismaticarpum =

Alismaticarpum Temporal range: Oligocene

Scientific classification
- Kingdom: Plantae
- Clade: Tracheophytes
- Clade: Angiosperms
- Clade: Monocots
- Order: Alismatales
- Family: Alismataceae
- Genus: †Alismaticarpum; M.E.Collinson
- Species: †A. alatum

Binomial name
- †Alismaticarpum alatum M.E.Collinson

Extinct species of flowering plant

Alismaticarpum alatum is a fossil species of aquatic plants in the family Alismataceae. It is a form taxon created for winged fruits whose precise assignment to a genus is not possible. Fossil fruits of this species are known from the Oligocene of England.
