= Wiesneria =

Scientific classification
- Kingdom: Plantae
- Clade: Tracheophytes
- Clade: Angiosperms
- Clade: Monocots
- Order: Alismatales
- Family: Alismataceae
- Genus: Wiesneria; M.Micheli

Type species
- Wiesneria triandra (Dalzell) M.Micheli

Species
- See text

Genus of flowering plants

Wiesneria is a genus in the family Alismataceae. The plant usually lives in natural temporary water pools on lateritic plateaus. Wiesneria triandra was first described in the south of the Indian state of Maharashtra. They are well spread out over the regions they occupy and have no common uses, making them of least concern.

The name commemorates the physiologist Julius Wiesner.

== Species ==
At the present time (May 2015), there are three recognized species:

- Wiesneria filifolia Hook.f. - from Uganda to Botswana, plus Madagascar
- Wiesneria schweinfurthii Hook.f. - Hook.f. in G.Bentham & J.D.Hooker - from Senegal to Ethiopia, south to Botswana
- Wiesneria triandra (Dalzell) Micheli in A.L.P.P.de Candolle & A.C.P.de Candolle - southern India
