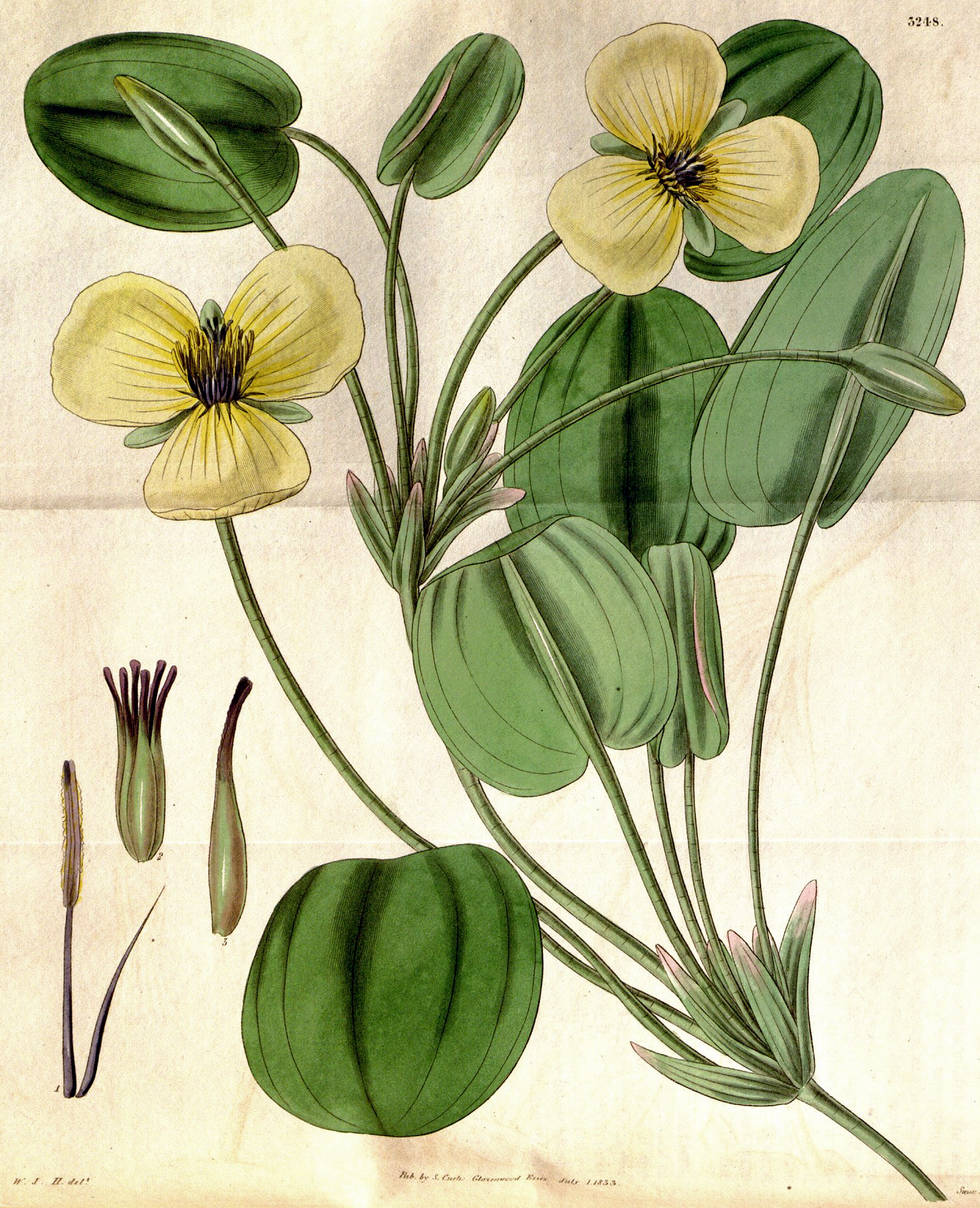
- Hydrocleys nymphoides Curtis's Botanical Magazine (1833)

Scientific classification
- Kingdom: Plantae
- Clade: Tracheophytes
- Clade: Angiosperms
- Clade: Monocots
- Order: Alismatales
- Family: Alismataceae
- Genus: Hydrocleys
- Species: H. nymphoides

Binomial name
- Hydrocleys nymphoides (Humb. & Bonpl. ex Willd.) Buchenau

Synonyms
- Stratiotes nymphoides Humb. & Bonpl. ex Willd.; Limnocharis humboldtii Rich.; Hydrocleys humboldtii (Rich.) Endl.; Vespuccia humboldtii (Rich.) Parl.; Limnocharis nymphoides (Humb. & Bonpl. ex Willd.) Micheli in A.L.P.P.de Candolle & A.C.P.de Candolle; Hydrocleys commersonii Rich.; Vespuccia americana C.Colón; Limnocharis commersonii (Rich.) Spreng.; Sagittaria ranunculoides Vell.; Hydrocleys azurea Schult.f. in C.F.P.von Martius

= Hydrocleys nymphoides =

Waterpoppy

Species of aquatic plant

Hydrocleys nymphoides, the waterpoppy or water-poppy, is an aquatic plant species in the Alismataceae. It is widespread across South America, Central America, Puerto Rico, Trinidad and the Netherlands Antilles. It is cultivated in many places for used in decorative ponds and artificial aquatic habitats, and naturalized in Australia, New Zealand, South Africa, Fiji, New Caledonia, French Polynesia, Florida, Louisiana and Texas.

== Gallery ==
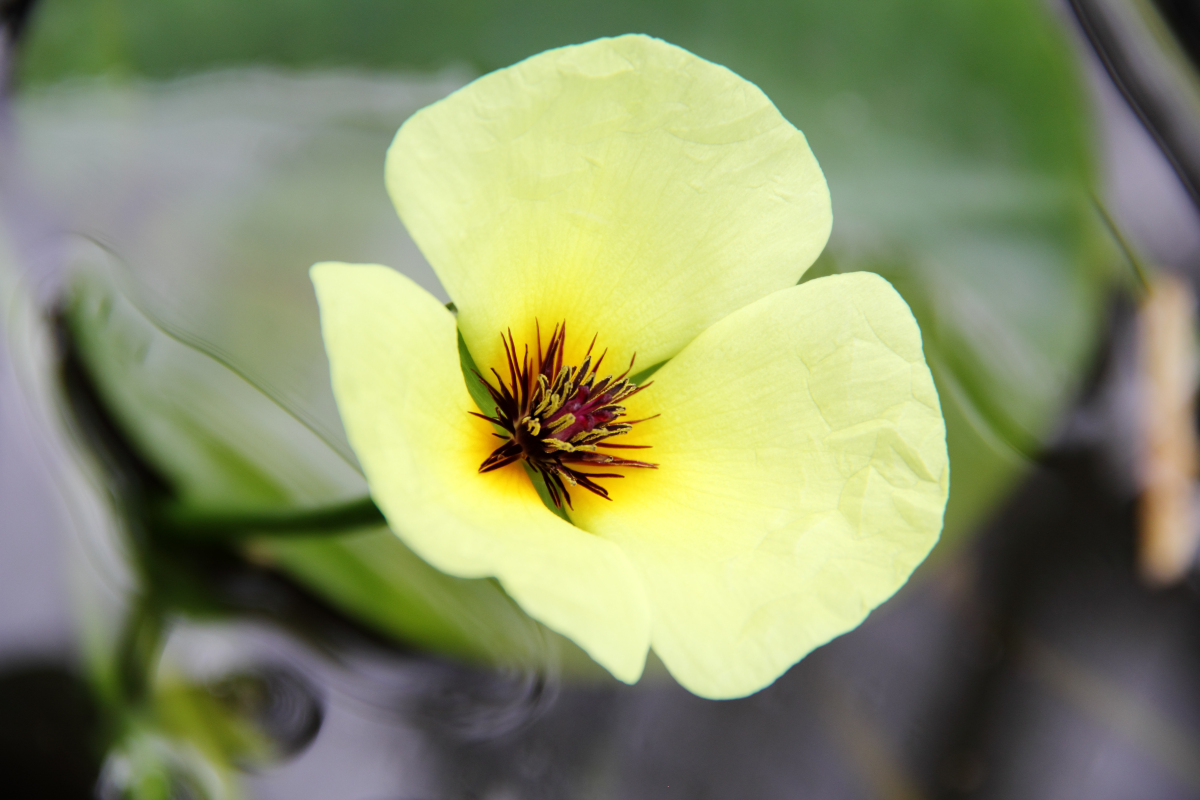
Flower of Hydrocleys nymphoides

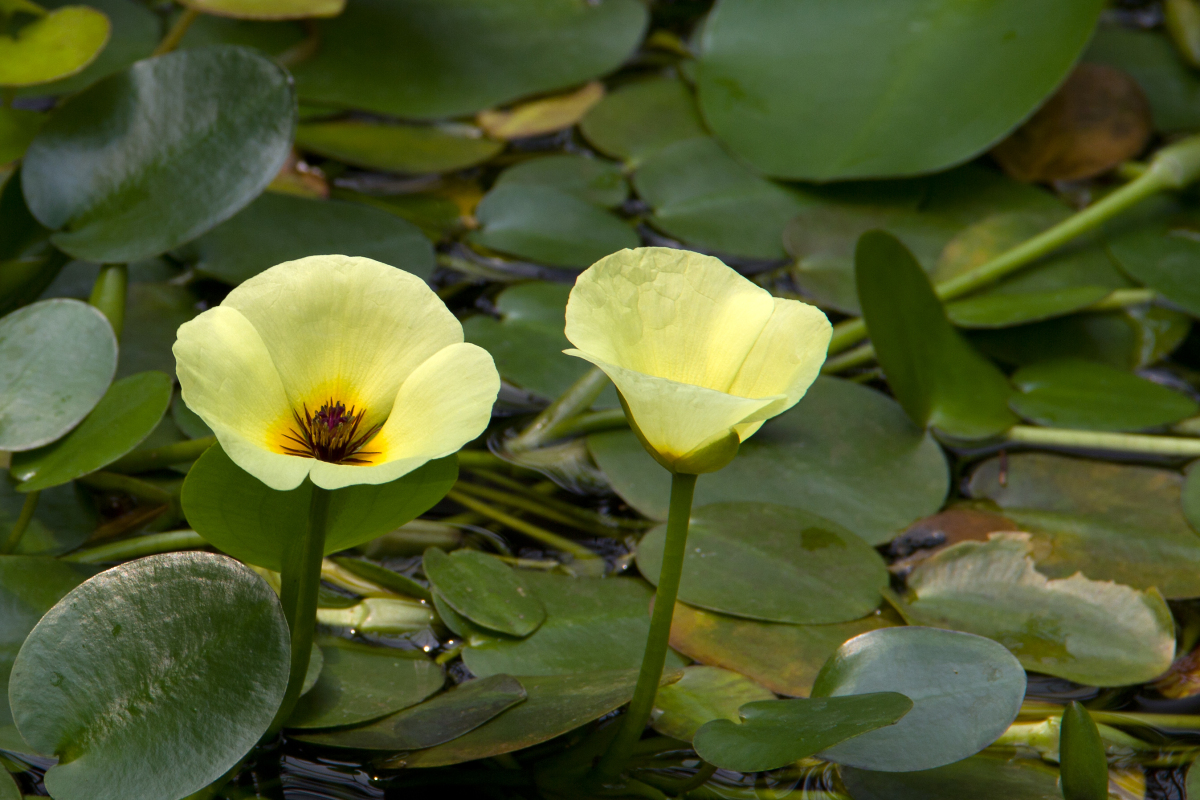
