= Burnatia =

Conservation status
- Least Concern (IUCN 3.1)

Scientific classification
- Kingdom: Plantae
- Clade: Tracheophytes
- Clade: Angiosperms
- Clade: Monocots
- Order: Alismatales
- Family: Alismataceae
- Genus: Burnatia
- Species: B. enneandra

Binomial name
- Burnatia enneandra Micheli in A.DC. & C.DC.

Synonyms
- Alisma enneandrum Hochst. ex Micheli in A.DC. & C.DC.; Echinodorus schinzii Buchenau; Rautanenia schinzii (Buchenau) Buchenau; Nemopotalon schinzii (Buchenau) Buchenau; Burnatia schinzii (Buchenau) Buchenau; Burnatia alismatoides Peter; Burnatia oblonga Peter; Burnatia alismatoides var. elliptica Peter; Burnatia enneandra var. linearis Peter

Genus of flowering plants

Burnatia is a genus in the family Alismataceae. It includes only one currently recognized species, Burnatia enneandra. It is native to tropical and southern Africa from Senegal to Tanzania to South Africa. Among genera of the Alismataceae, it can be distinguished by not having a differentiated perianth (in Burnatia the petals are reduced), and being dioecious, with male and female flowers on separate individuals. Male flowers have 6 to 9 stamens and female flowers have many carpels and up to 2 staminodia.
