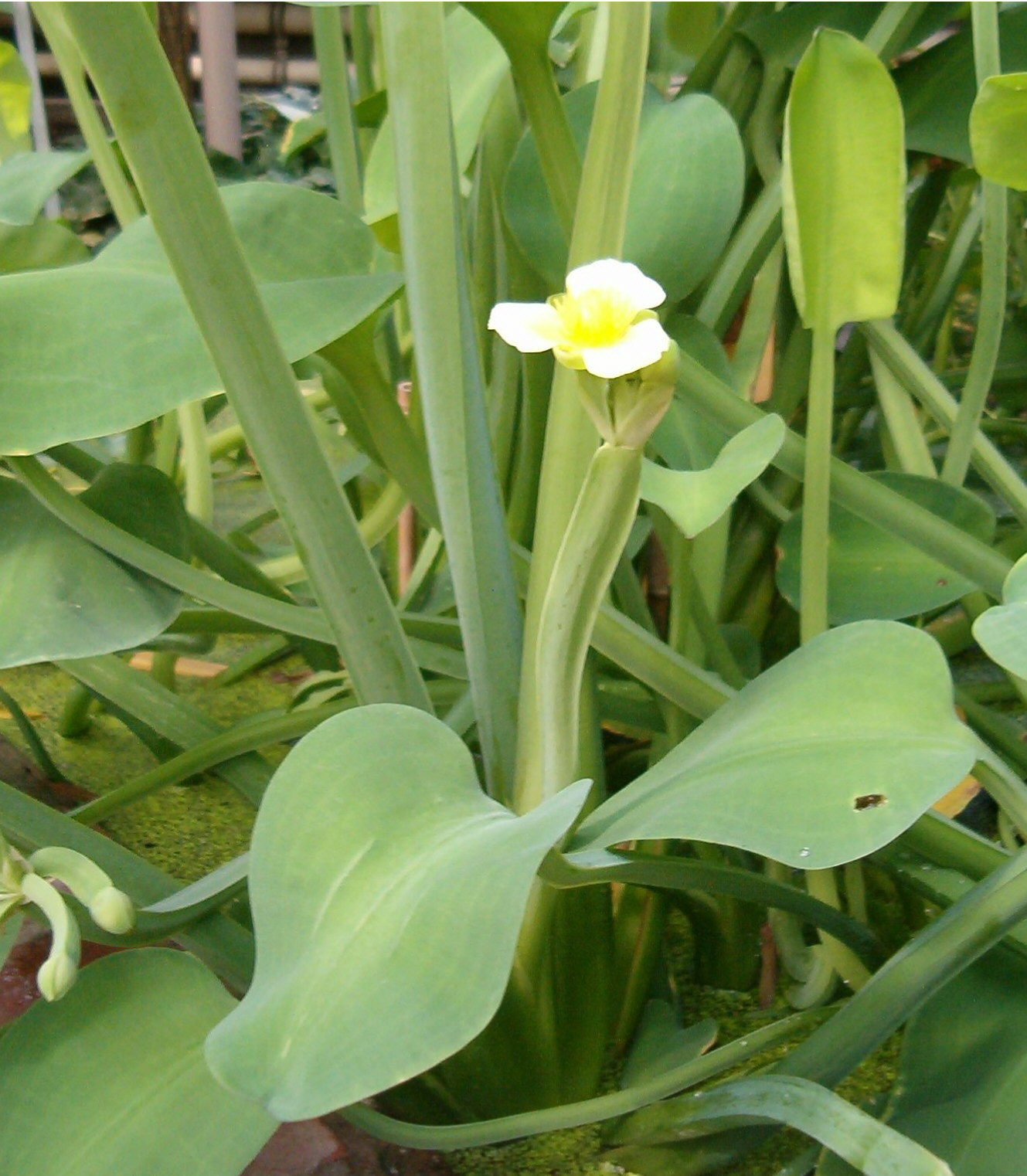
- Limnocharis flava

Scientific classification
- Kingdom: Plantae
- Clade: Tracheophytes
- Clade: Angiosperms
- Clade: Monocots
- Order: Alismatales
- Family: Alismataceae
- Genus: Limnocharis; Humb. & Bonpl.

= Limnocharis =

Genus of flowering plants

Limnocharis is a genus of plants in the family Alismataceae, native to Mexico, Central America, the West Indies and South America, but naturalized in China, India, and Southeast Asia as well. Two species are recognized as of May 2014:

- Limnocharis flava (L.) Buchenau - most of generic range
- Limnocharis laforestii Duchass. ex Griseb - from Mexico to Argentina
