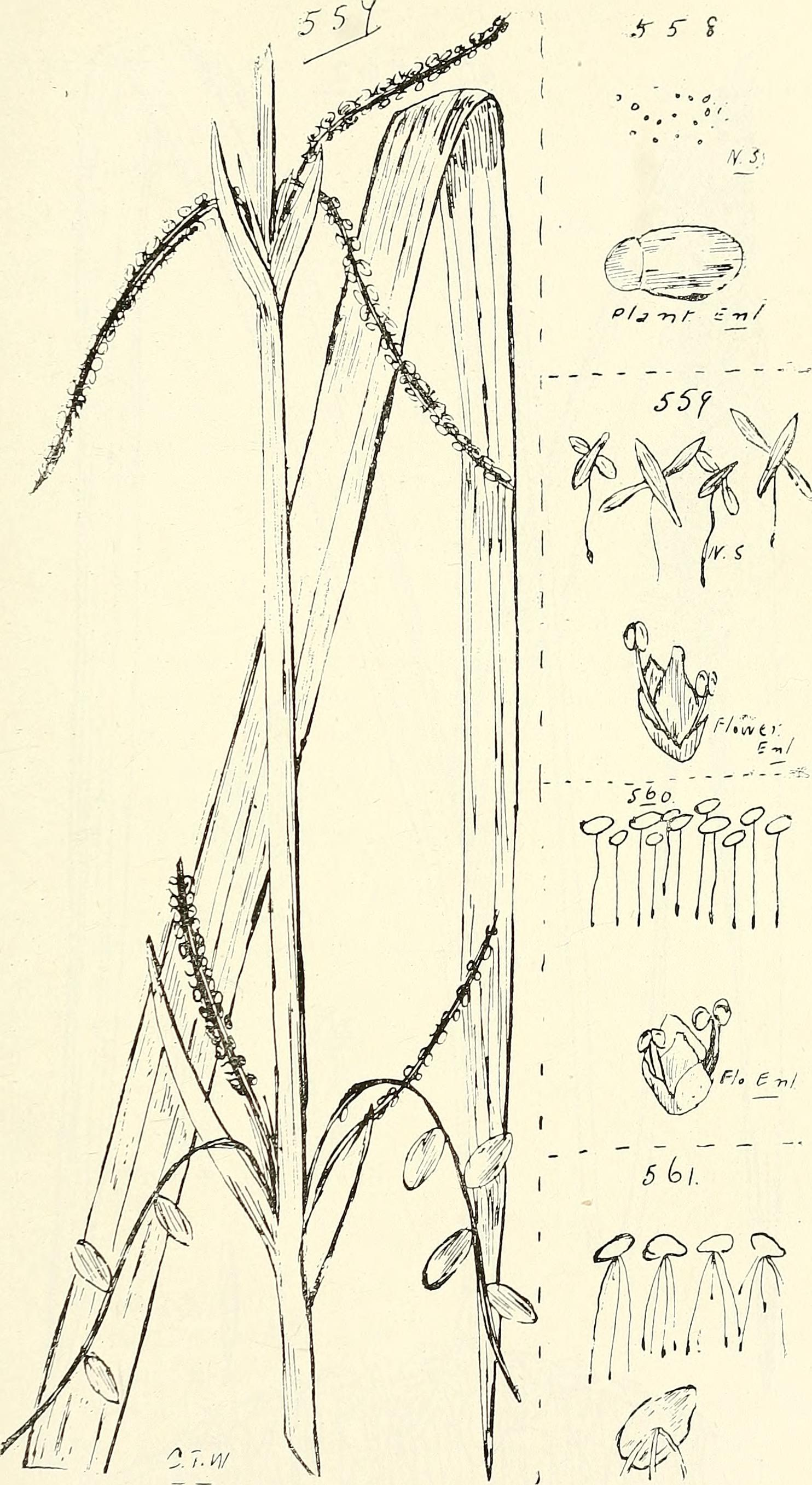
- Butomopsis latifolia

Scientific classification
- Kingdom: Plantae
- Clade: Tracheophytes
- Clade: Angiosperms
- Clade: Monocots
- Order: Alismatales
- Family: Alismataceae
- Genus: Butomopsis; Kunth
- Species: B. latifolia

Binomial name
- Butomopsis latifolia (D.Don) Kunth

Synonyms
- Tenagocharis Hochst.

= Butomopsis =

Genus of flowering plants

Butomopsis is a genus of plants in the family Alismataceae. It contains only one species, Butomopsis latifolia. native to tropical Africa (from Senegal to Sudan to Mozambique), South Asia (India, Nepal, Bhutan, Bangladesh), Southeast Asia (Java, Burma, Laos, Thailand, Vietnam, Yunnan) and northern Australia (Queensland and Northern Territory).
