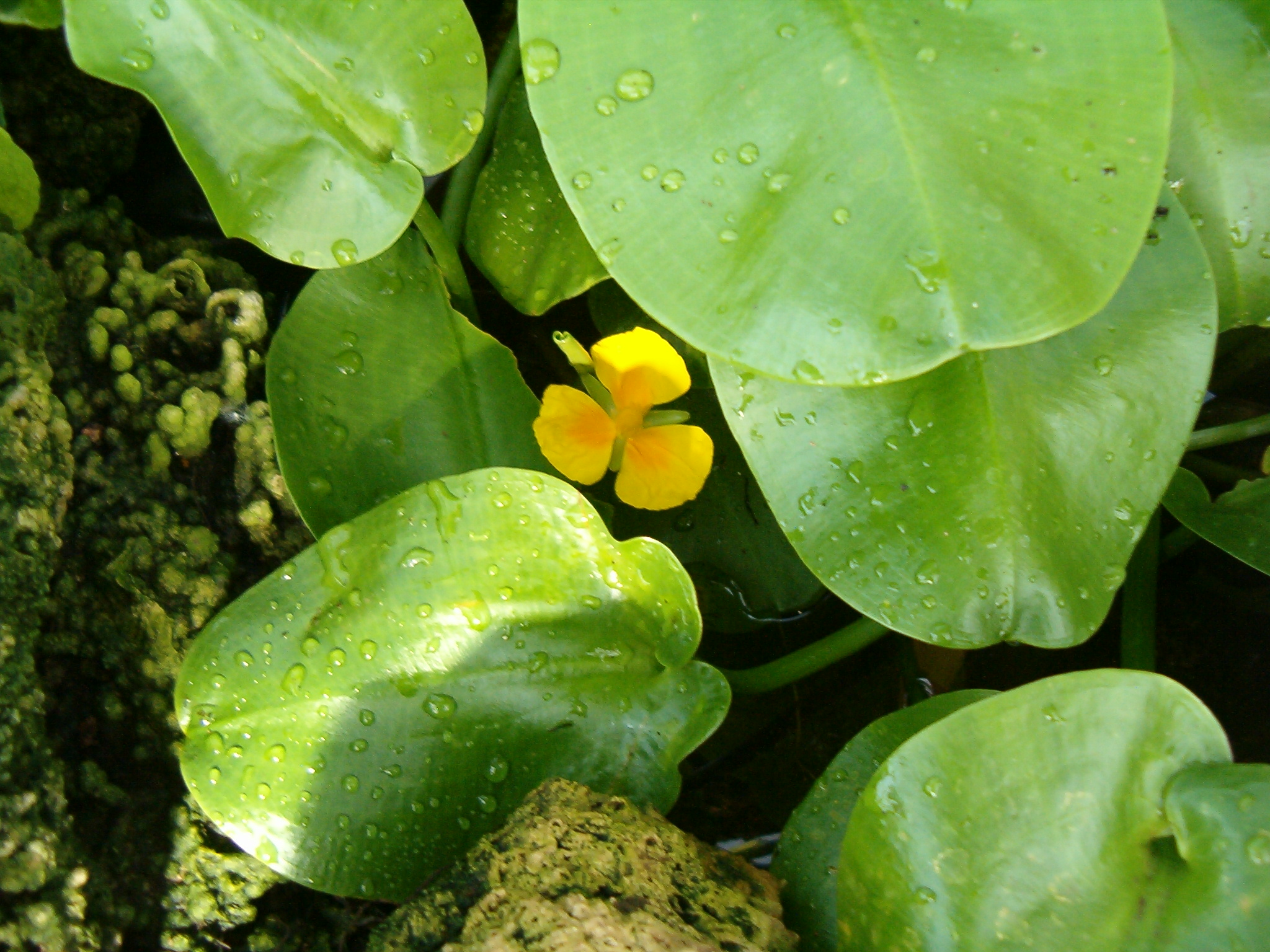
- Hydrocleys martii
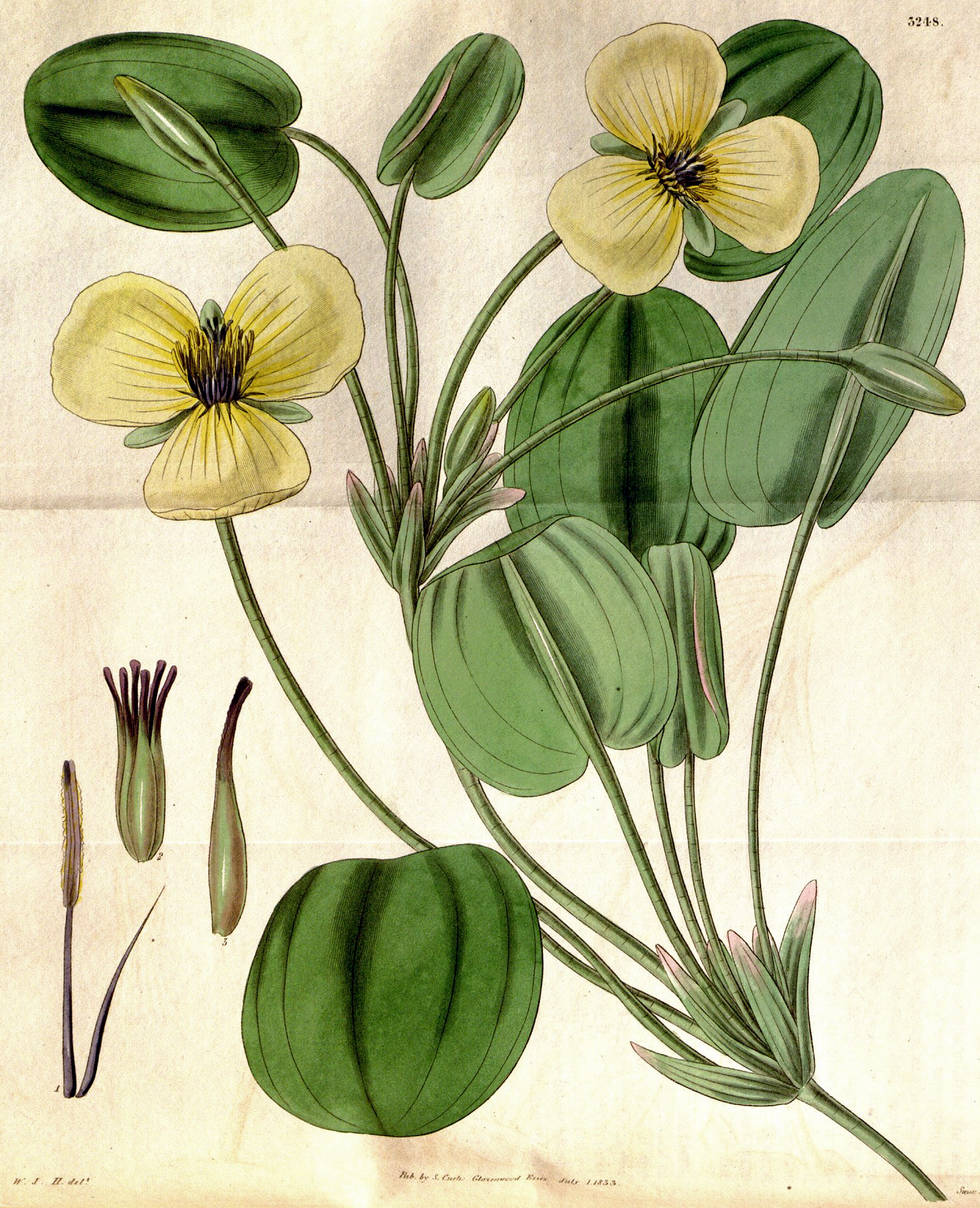
- Hydrocleys nymphoides Curtis's Botanical Magazine (1833)

Scientific classification
- Kingdom: Plantae
- Clade: Tracheophytes
- Clade: Angiosperms
- Clade: Monocots
- Order: Alismatales
- Family: Alismataceae
- Genus: Hydrocleys; Rich.

Type species
- Hydrocleys commersonii (syn of H. nymphoides) Rich.

Species
- See text

= Hydrocleys =

Genus of aquatic plants

Hydrocleys is a genus of aquatic plants in the Alismataceae, native to the Western Hemisphere, though one is naturalized elsewhere and sold as an ornamental for decorative ponds and artificial aquatic habitats. At present (May 2014), five species are recognized:

Image	Scientific name	Distribution
	Hydrocleys martii Seub. in C.F.P.von Martius	Brazil, Argentina, Uruguay
	Hydrocleys mattogrossensis (Kuntze) Holm-Niels. & R.R.Haynes	Brazil, Bolivia
	Hydrocleys modesta Pedersen	Brazil, Argentina, Paraguay
	Hydrocleys nymphoides (Humb. & Bonpl. ex Willd.) Buchenau	widespread across South America, Central America, Puerto Rico, Trinidad and the Netherlands Antilles. Also naturalized in Australia, New Zealand, South Africa, Fiji, New Caledonia, French Polynesia, Florida, Louisiana and Texas
	Hydrocleys parviflora Seub. in C.F.P.von Martius	Mexico, Central America, Venezuela, Colombia, Bolivia, Brazil
