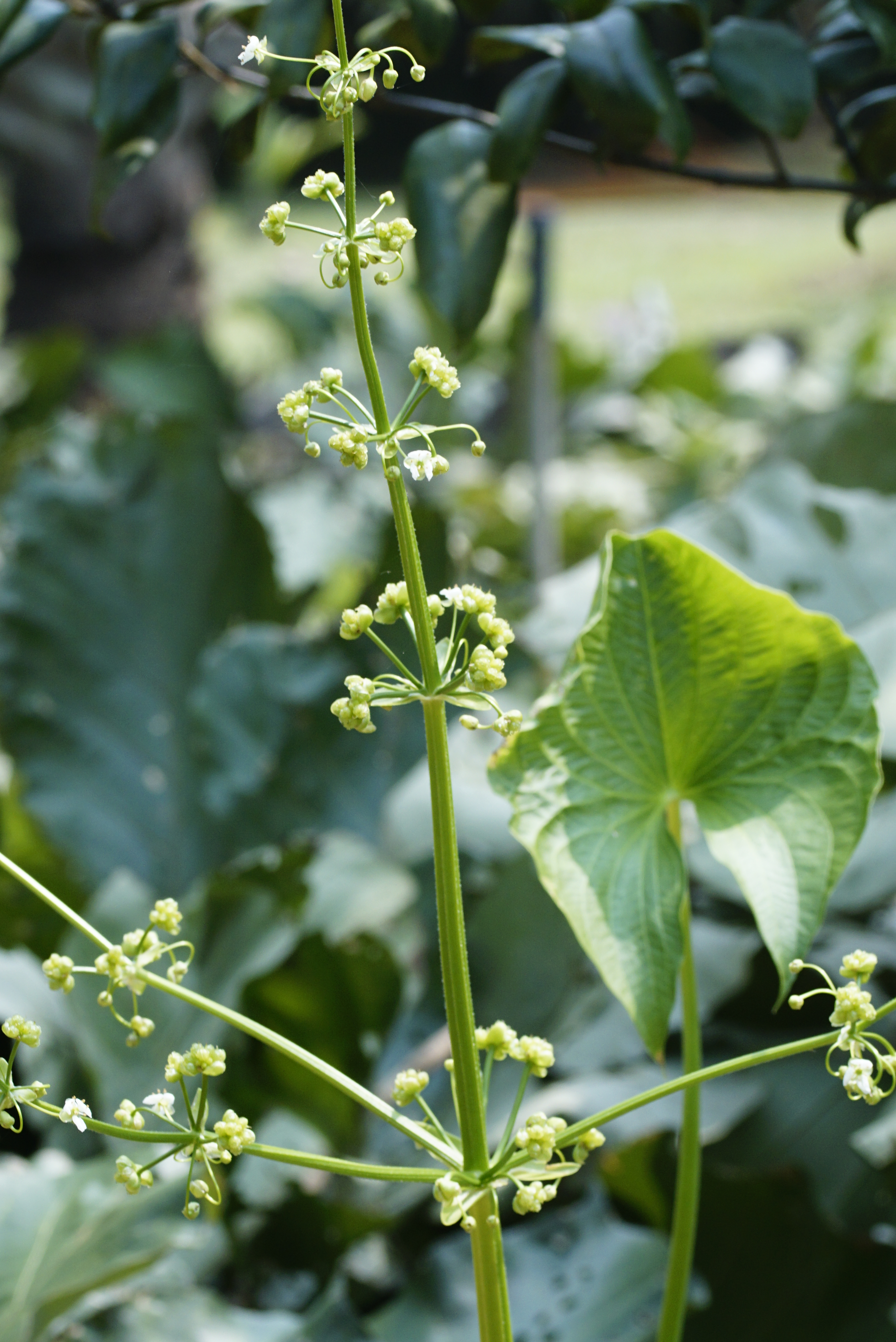
- Limnophyton obtusifolium

Scientific classification
- Kingdom: Plantae
- Clade: Tracheophytes
- Clade: Angiosperms
- Clade: Monocots
- Order: Alismatales
- Family: Alismataceae
- Genus: Limnophyton; Miq.

Type species
- Limnophyton obtusifolium (L.) Miq.

Species
- See text

= Limnophyton =

Genus of aquatic plants

Limnophyton is a genus in the family Alismataceae. It includes five species from the Old World tropics. Three species are recognized as of May 2014:

== Species ==
- Limnophyton angolense Buchenau in H.G.A.Engler - tropical Africa from Liberia to Sudan to Botswana
- Limnophyton fluitans Graebn. - Nigeria, Cameroon, Equatorial Guinea
- Limnophyton obtusifolium (L.) Miq. - Africa from Liberia to South Africa; Madagascar; India, Pakistan, Sri Lanka, Myanmar (Burma), Vietnam, Indonesia
