= Filippo Parlatore =

Botanist from Italy (1816–1877)

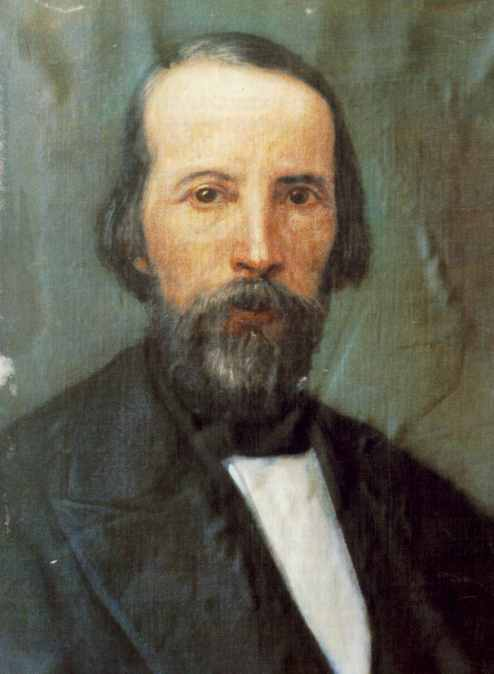
Portrait of Filippo Parlatore

Filippo Parlatore (Palermo, 8 August 1816 – Florence, 9 September 1877) was an Italian botanist.

He studied medicine at Palermo, but practiced only for a short time, his chief activity being during the cholera epidemic of 1837. Although at that time he had been an assistant professor of anatomy, a subject on which he had already written (Treatise on the human retina), he soon gave up all other interests to devote his entire attention to botany. He first made a study of the flora of Sicily, publishing in 1838 Flora panormitana (Palermo); he also dealt with the Sicilian flora in later works. In 1840 he left home to begin his extended botanical expeditions. He travelled all through Italy, then into Switzerland (where he remained for a time at Geneva with De Candolle), to France (where he was at Paris with Webb, the Englishman) and to England, his longest stay being at Kew. His part in the Third Congress of Italian naturalists held at Florence in 1841 was of significance for him and for the development of botanical studies in Italy. At this congress, in his celebrated memoir Sulla botanica in Italia, he proposed, among other things, that a general herbarium be established at Florence. This proposal was adopted. Grand Duke Leopold sought his assistance for this herbarium, gave him the post of professor of botany at the museum of natural sciences (a chair which had been vacant for almost thirty years), and made him director of the botanical garden connected with the museum. For more than three decades Parlatore was most active in fulfilling the duties of these positions, one of his principal services being the contribution of Collections botaniques du musée royale de physique et d'histoire naturelle (Florence, 1874) to the great collection entitled Erbario centrale italiano. His own private herbarium is now a part of the central herbarium, containing about 1900-2500 fascicules. In 1849 he made an investigation of the flora of the Mont-Blanc chain of the Alps; in 1851 he explored those of Northern Europe, Lapland, and Finland; the reports of these two expeditions appeared respectively in 1850 and 1854.

He published numerous treatises on botanical subjects,---discussing questions of system, organography, physiology, plant geography, and paleontology---in various periodicals, chiefly in the Giornale botanico Italiano (1844-), which he founded. He also gave considerable attention to the history of botany in Italy. His lifework in botany, however, is Flora Italiana, of which five volumes appeared between 1848 and 1874; the next five were issued by Teodoro Caruel (to 1894) with the assistance of Parlatore's manuscript. This work stands in high repute among all botanists. Mention should also be made of Lezioni di botanica comparata (Florence, 1843) and Monographia delle fumarie (Florence, 1844). To the sixteenth volume of De Candolle's Prodromus, Parlatore contributed the accounts of the conifers and Gnetaceae; to Webb's Histoire naturelle des îles Canaries (Paris, 1836–50), the accounts of the Umbelliferae and Graminae.

In 1842, Pierre Edmond Boissier named a genus of plants from Middle Asia as Parlatoria (part of the Brassicaceae family).

== See also ==
- Category:Taxa named by Filippo Parlatore
