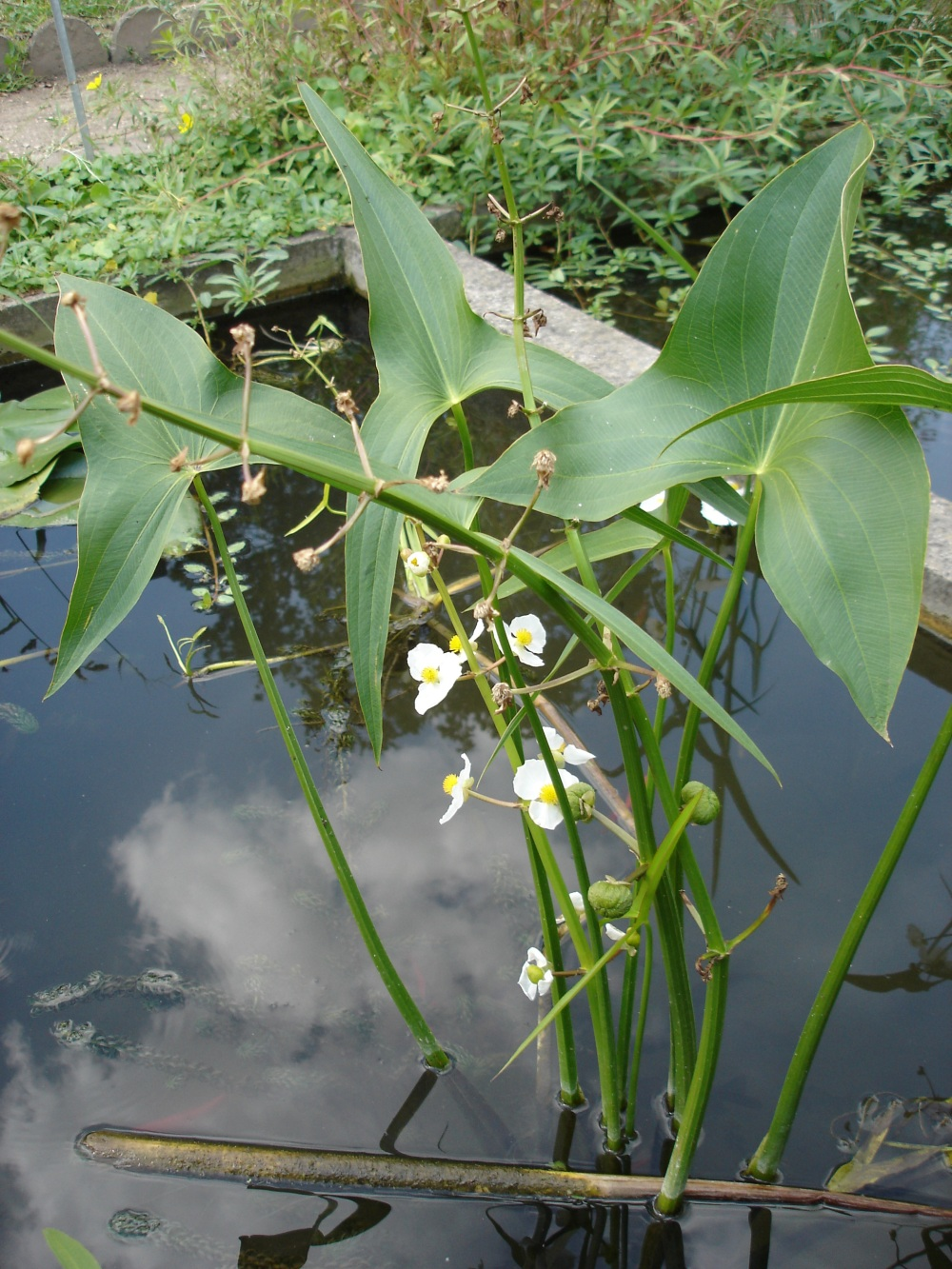
- Sagittaria latifolia

Scientific classification
- Kingdom: Plantae
- Clade: Tracheophytes
- Clade: Angiosperms
- Clade: Monocots
- Order: Alismatales
- Family: Alismataceae; Vent.

Type genus
- Alisma L.

Genera
- See text
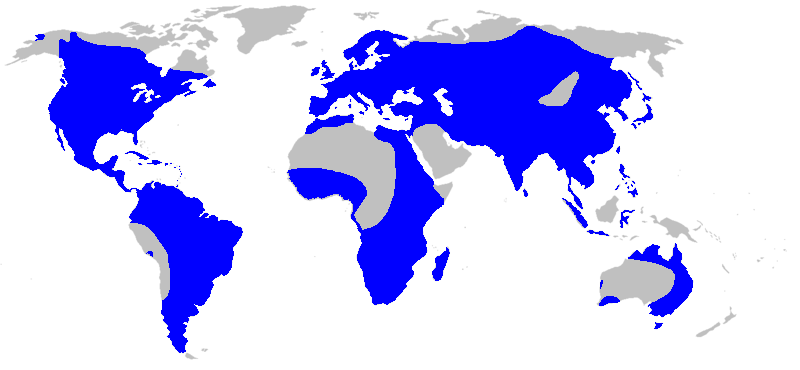
- Alismataceae distribution map

Synonyms
- Limnocharitaceae Takht. ex Cronquist

= Alismataceae =

Alismataceae Temporal range: Upper Cretaceous–Recent

Family of flowering plants comprising the water-plantains

The water-plantains (Alismataceae) are a family of flowering plants, comprising 20 genera (17 extant and 3 fossil) and 119 species. The family has a cosmopolitan distribution, with the greatest number of species in temperate regions of the Northern Hemisphere. Most of the species are herbaceous aquatic plants growing in marshes and ponds.

== Description ==
Most Alismataceae are robust perennials, but some may be annual or perennial, depending on water conditions — they are normally perennial in permanent waters, annual in more seasonal conditions but there are exceptions. The stems are corm-like or stoloniferous. Juvenile and submerse leaves are often linear, whilst more mature and emerse leaves can be linear to ovate or even sagittate. Most have a distinct petiole, with a sheathed base.

The inflorescence is usually compound with whorls of branches, though some are umbel-like, and others have solitary flowers. The flowers are regular, bisexual or unisexual. There are three sepals which usually persist in the fruit. Three petals, usually conspicuous, white, pink, purple, occasionally with yellow or purple spots. The petals rarely last more than one day. In Burnatia and Wiesneria the petals are minute and even occasionally absent in female flowers. Stamens are 3, 6, 9 or numerous. The ovary is superior, comprising 3 - numerous free carpels in one whorl or in a clustered head. Each carpel contains 1 (-2) anatropous ovules.

Fruit is a head of nutlets (except in Damasonium). The seeds have no endosperm and a curved or folded embryo.

== Classification ==
Under the APG III system, the Alismataceae includes three genera formerly members of the Limnocharitaceae. Altogether, there are 18 extant genera and two fossil genera assigned to the Alismataceae:

- Alismataceae
  - - - - - - - - Sagittaria
                - - - Limnophyton
                    - Astonia
                  - Wiesneria
              - Helanthium
            - Caldesia
          - Echinodorus
        - Albidella
      - Ranalisma
    - - - Hydrocleys
        - Butomopsis
      - Limnocharis
  - - - - - Alisma
          - Baldellia
        - Damasonium
      - Luronium
    - Burnatia

- Albidella Pichon
- Alisma L. – water-plantain
- Alismaticarpum † Collinson
- Aquarius Christenh. & Byng
- Astonia S.W.L.Jacobs
- Baldellia Parl. – lesser water-plantain
- Burnatia Micheli
- Butomopsis Kunth
- Caldesia Parl.
- Damasonium Mill. – starfruit, thrumwort
- Echinodorus Rich. ex Engelm. – - burhead, Amazon sword plant
- Helanthium (Benth. & Hook. f.) Engelm. ex J.G. Sm.
- Hydrocleys Rich.
- Limnocharis Bonpl.
- Limnophyton Miq.
- Luronium Raf. – floating water-plantain
- Nichima † L.Hern., Cevallos-Ferriz et Hernández-Damián
- Ranalisma Stapf
- Sagisma † Nikitin
- Sagittaria L. - arrowhead, duck potato, katniss, omodaka (Japanese: 沢瀉), swamp potato, tule potato, wapato, wapatoo
- Wiesneria Micheli

== Cultivation and uses ==
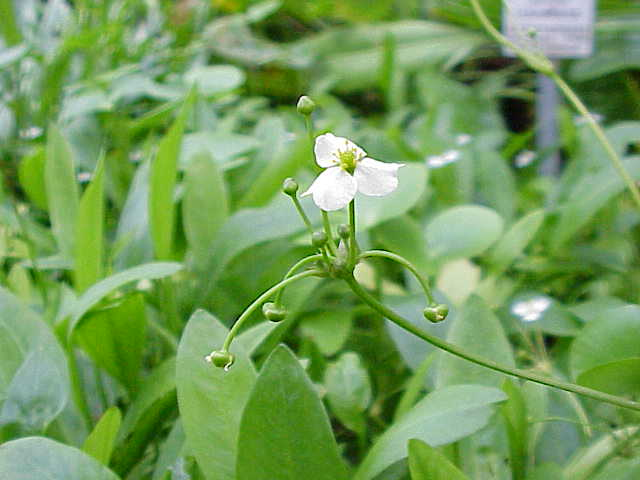
Echinodorus isthmicus

Several species, notably in the genus Sagittaria, have edible rhizomes, grown for both human food and animal fodder in southern and eastern Asia. They were eaten as food by the indigenous peoples of North America. Most have value as food for wildlife. Some are grown as ornamental plants in bog gardens, ponds and aquariums. The leaves and flower buds of Limnocharis flava are eaten in Southeast Asia as "poor people's vegetable".
