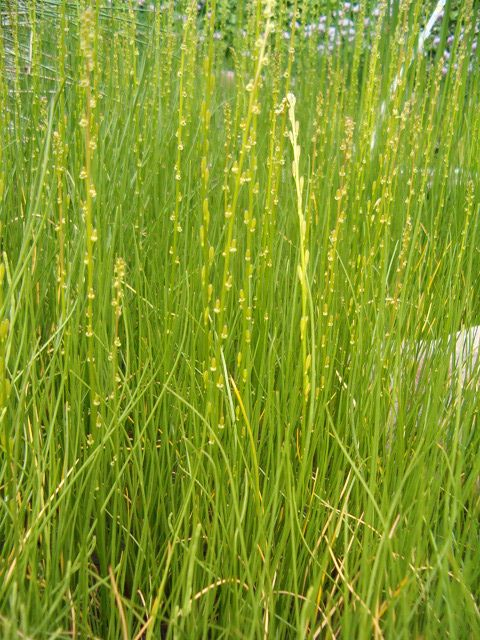
- Triglochin palustris
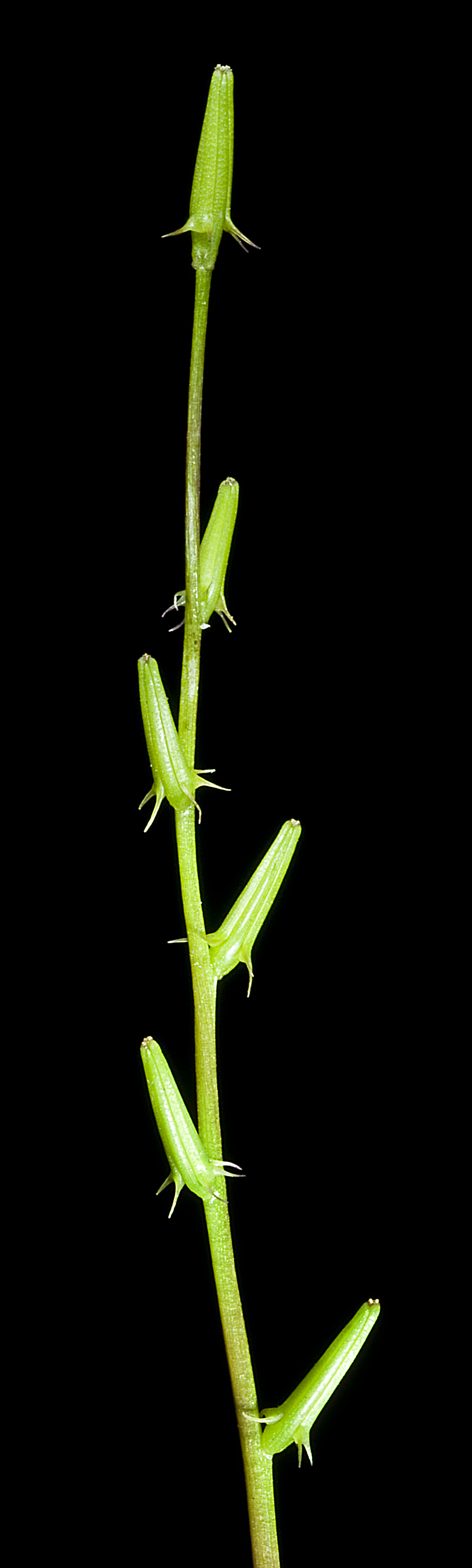
- Triglochin calcitrapa

Scientific classification
- Kingdom: Plantae
- Clade: Embryophytes
- Clade: Tracheophytes
- Clade: Angiosperms
- Clade: Monocots
- Order: Alismatales
- Family: Juncaginaceae
- Genus: Triglochin; L.

Synonyms
- Juncago Ség.; Lilaea Bonpl.; Tristemon Raf. 1819 not Raf. 1838 (Juncaceae) nor Klotzsch 1838 (Ericaceae) nor Scheele 1848 (Cucurbitaceae); Abbotia Raf.; Heterostylus Hook.; Hexaglochin Nieuwl.

= Triglochin =

Arrowgrass

Genus of flowering plants in the arrowgrass family

Triglochin is a plant genus in the family Juncaginaceae described by Carl Linnaeus in 1753. It includes 25 known species. It is very nearly cosmopolitan in distribution, with species on every continent except Antarctica. North America has four accepted species, two of which can also be found in Europe: Triglochin palustris (marsh arrowgrass) and Triglochin maritima (sea arrowgrass). Australia has many more.

The most widely used common name for the genus is arrowgrass, although these plants are not really grasses. Many of the common names for species make use of the term "arrowgrass", although there are exceptions: T. procera, for example, is commonly known as water ribbons.

Arrowgrasses are used as food plants by the larvae of some Lepidoptera species including the grey chi moth.

== Description ==
This genus contains marsh herbs with flat or cylindrical leaves.

The inflorescences are spikes or racemes. The flowers have two bracts. Each flower has three or six herbaceous and deciduous perianth segments. Three to six stamens are connected at the base of the perianth segments and fall with the perianths. There are three to six carpels with a one chambered ovary containing a single ovule. The styles are short and may be fused at the base. The stigmas are often stalkless and plumose.

The fruits have 3–6 free or fused curved follicles or achenes (small, dry, one seeded fruits with a loose covering) that break away from a persistent three winged axis. The seed is erect with a straight embryo.

== Species ==
The following species are accepted:

- Triglochin barrelieri – Mediterranean
- Triglochin buchenaui – Cape Province
- Triglochin bulbosa – Cape Province
- Triglochin calcitrapa – Western Australia
- Triglochin centrocarpa – Australia
- Triglochin compacta – Cape Province
- Triglochin elongata – Cape Province, KwaZulu-Natal
- Triglochin gaspensis – E Canada (Nfl NB PEI NS Qbc), Maine
- Triglochin hexagona – Australia
- Triglochin isingiana – Australia
- Triglochin laxiflora – Mediterranean
- Triglochin longicarpa – Western Australia
- Triglochin maritima – Europe, Asia, North America, Algeria, Tunisia, Chile, Argentina
- Triglochin mexicana – C + S Mexico
- Triglochin milnei – from Tanzania to Angola + KwaZulu-Natal
- Triglochin minutissima – Australia
- Triglochin mucronata – Australia
- Triglochin muelleri – Australia
- Triglochin palustris – Europe, Asia, North America, Algeria, Morocco, Chile, Argentina
- Triglochin protuberans – Western Australia
- Triglochin scilloides – W Canada (BC Alb Sas), W United States (WA OR CA NV MT), Mexico, South America
- Triglochin stowardii – Western Australia
- Triglochin striata – Australia, New Zealand, Africa, United States, Bahamas, Cuba, South America
- Triglochin trichophora – Australia
- Triglochin turrifera – Australia

Formerly included

Now in other genera: Bulbine, Cycnogeton and Tetroncium

- Triglochin alcockiae – Cycnogeton alcockiae – Australia
- Triglochin dubia – Cycnogeton dubium – Australia, New Guinea
- Triglochin huegelii – Cycnogeton huegelii – Western Australia
- Triglochin linearis – Cycnogeton lineare – Western Australia
- Triglochin magellanica – Tetroncium magellanicum – Tierra del Fuego, Falkland Is, Gough I
- Triglochin maundii – Maundia triglochinoides – Australia
- Triglochin microtuberosa – Cycnogeton microtuberosum – Australia
- Triglochin multifructa – Cycnogeton multifructum – Australia
- Triglochin procera – Cycnogeton procerum – Australia
- Triglochin pterocarpa – Cycnogeton dubium – Australia, New Guinea
- Triglochin racemosa – Bulbine semibarbata – Australia
- Triglochin reflexa – Tetroncium magellanicum – Tierra del Fuego, Falkland Is, Gough I
- Triglochin rheophila – Cycnogeton rheophilum – Australia
- Triglochin triglochinoides – Maundia triglochinoides – Australia
