= Triglochin gaspensis =

Scientific classification
- Kingdom: Plantae
- Clade: Tracheophytes
- Clade: Angiosperms
- Clade: Monocots
- Order: Alismatales
- Family: Juncaginaceae
- Genus: Triglochin
- Species: T. gaspensis

Binomial name
- Triglochin gaspensis Lieth & D.Löve

Species of flowering plant

Triglochin gaspensis (common name - Gaspé Peninsula arrow grass) is a species of flowering plant in the family Juncaginaceae, native to eastern Canada (New Brunswick, Newfoundland island, Nova Scotia, Prince Edward Island and Quebec), and Maine in the north-eastern United States, where it is found growing in the tidal zone of the Atlantic coast below the high-water mark. It was first described by Helmut Lieth and Doris Löve in 1961.
