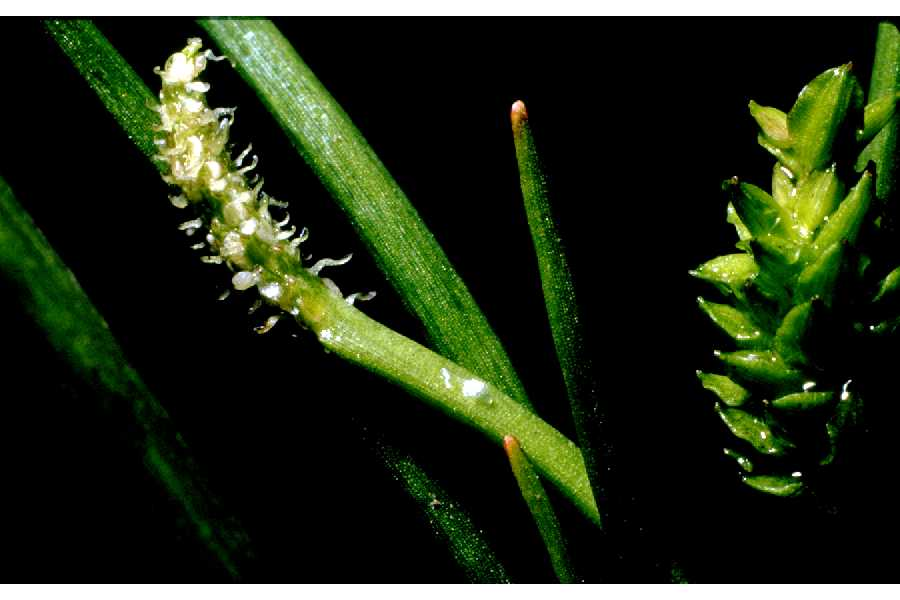

Scientific classification
- Kingdom: Plantae
- Clade: Tracheophytes
- Clade: Angiosperms
- Clade: Monocots
- Order: Alismatales
- Family: Juncaginaceae
- Genus: Triglochin
- Species: T. scilloides

Binomial name
- Triglochin scilloides (Poir.) Mering & Kadereit

Synonyms
- Anthericum scilloides (Poir.) Schult. & Schult.f.; Heterostylus gramineus Hook.; Lilaea scilloides (Poir.) Hauman; Lilaea scilloides var. batucoanus Gunckel; Lilaea subulata Bonpl.; Lilaea superba Rojas; Liliago scilloides (Poir.) C.Presl; Phalangium scilloides Poir.

= Triglochin scilloides =

Species of aquatic plant

Triglochin scilloides, synonym Lilaea scilloides, is a species of aquatic plants native from western Canada to Mexico, and to western and southern South America. It has been introduced into Portugal and Spain. English names include flowering quillwort. At one time, it was the only species accepted in the genus Lilaea.

== Description ==
Triglochin scilloides is an annual herb growing in or just next to water in several types of shallow aquatic habitat, including vernal pools, mudflats, streams, ponds and ditches. The plant takes the form of a tuft of basal leaves around a very short stem. Each onionlike leaf is very narrow, long and pointed, reaching 25 to 40 cm long. It is wrapped in a translucent sheath at the base. The inflorescences include clusters of staminate and bisexual flowers at the tip of a narrow stalk as well as pistillate flowers in underwater axils. The pistillate flower is composed of a threadlike style which may be up to 30 cm long tipped with a stigma which floats on the water surface. The fruit is a beaked, ribbed nutlet up to 1 cm long.

== Taxonomy ==
The species was first described in 1804 by Jean Louis Marie Poiret, as Phalangium scilloides. In 1925, it was moved to the genus Lilaea as Lilaea scilloides, where it was accepted at one time as the only species in a monotypic genus. In 2010, it was moved to Triglochin scilloides, the name accepted by Plants of the World Online as of March 2024.
