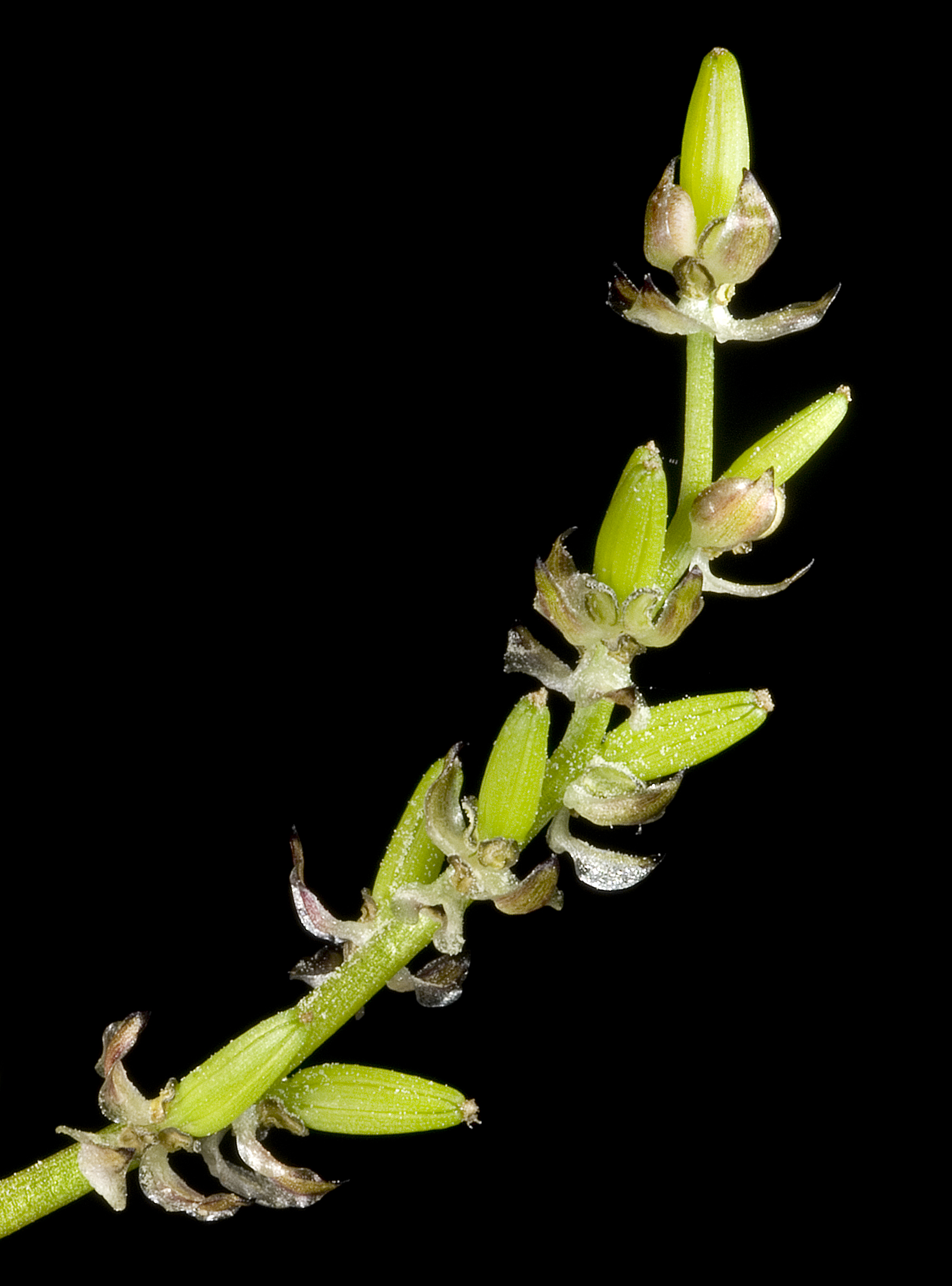

Scientific classification
- Kingdom: Plantae
- Clade: Tracheophytes
- Clade: Angiosperms
- Clade: Monocots
- Order: Alismatales
- Family: Juncaginaceae
- Genus: Triglochin
- Species: T. muelleri

Binomial name
- Triglochin muelleri Buchenau

= Triglochin muelleri =

Species of flowering plant

Triglochin muelleri is a species of flowering plant in the family Juncaginaceae, first described by Franz Georg Philipp Buchenau in 1903, and native to Western Australia and South Australia.

It is a tufted annual herb growing from 0.05 to 0.2 m high, in salt lakes, swamps and places that are wet in winter. It flowers from September to November.
