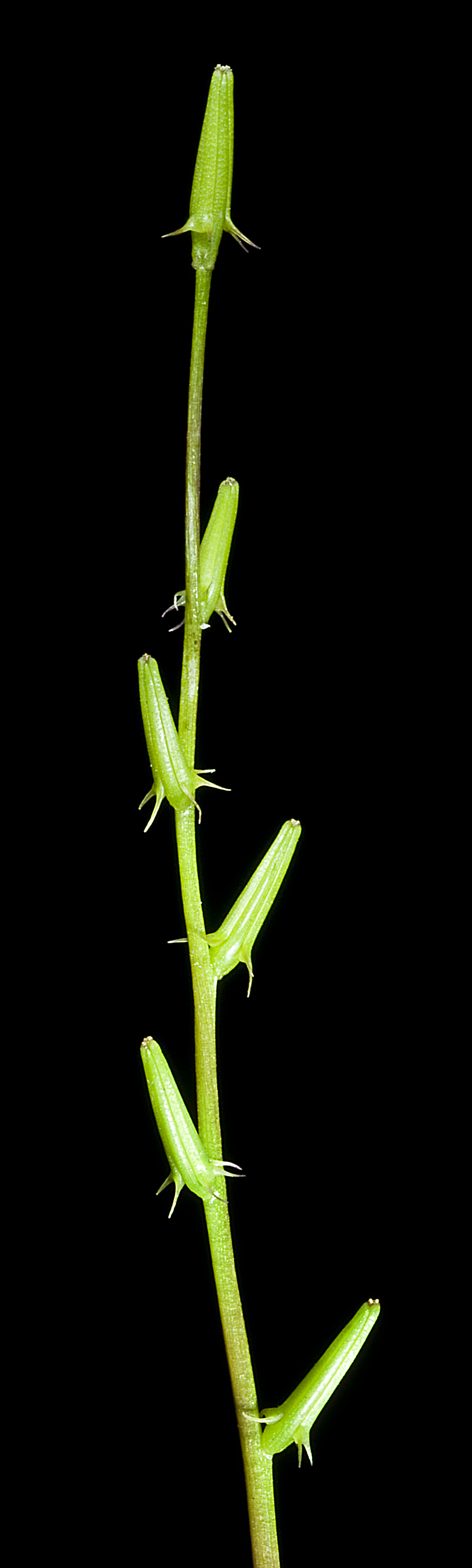

Scientific classification
- Kingdom: Plantae
- Clade: Tracheophytes
- Clade: Angiosperms
- Clade: Monocots
- Order: Alismatales
- Family: Juncaginaceae
- Genus: Triglochin
- Species: T. calcitrapa

Binomial name
- Triglochin calcitrapa Hook.

= Triglochin calcitrapa =

Species of flowering plant

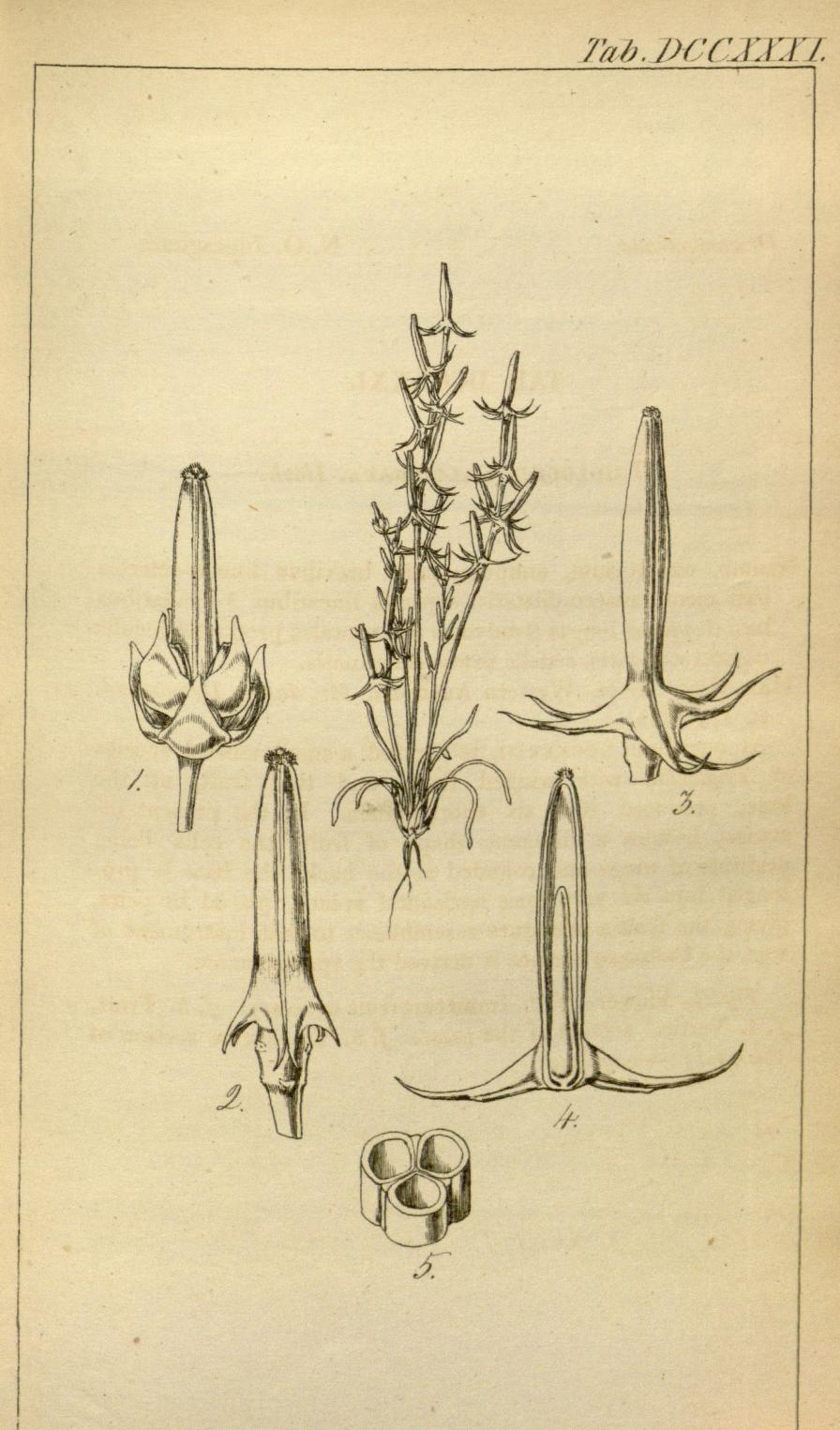
Triglochin calcitrapa t. 731

Triglochin calcitrapa is a species of flowering plant in the family Juncaginaceae, first described by William Jackson Hooker in 1848, and native to south-west Western Australia.

== Description ==
(From Hooker

At our Tab. DCCXXVIII (should read DCCXXXI), is figured a small annual species of Triglochin with winged fruit, and that fruit, at the base, produced into six short spines. In the present instance, besides a different shape of fruit (the cells being destitute of wings and rounded at the back), the base is prolonged into six very long horizontal spines, placed in pairs, giving the fruit a miniature resemblance to that instrument of war, the Caltrops, whence is derived the specific name.

Fig f.1. Flower. f. 2. Immature fruit or ovary. f. 3. Fruit. f. 4. Vertical section of the same. f. 5. Transverse section of the ovary: magnified.
HAB. Swan River, Western Australia. Mr. James Drummond. n. 17, 1845
