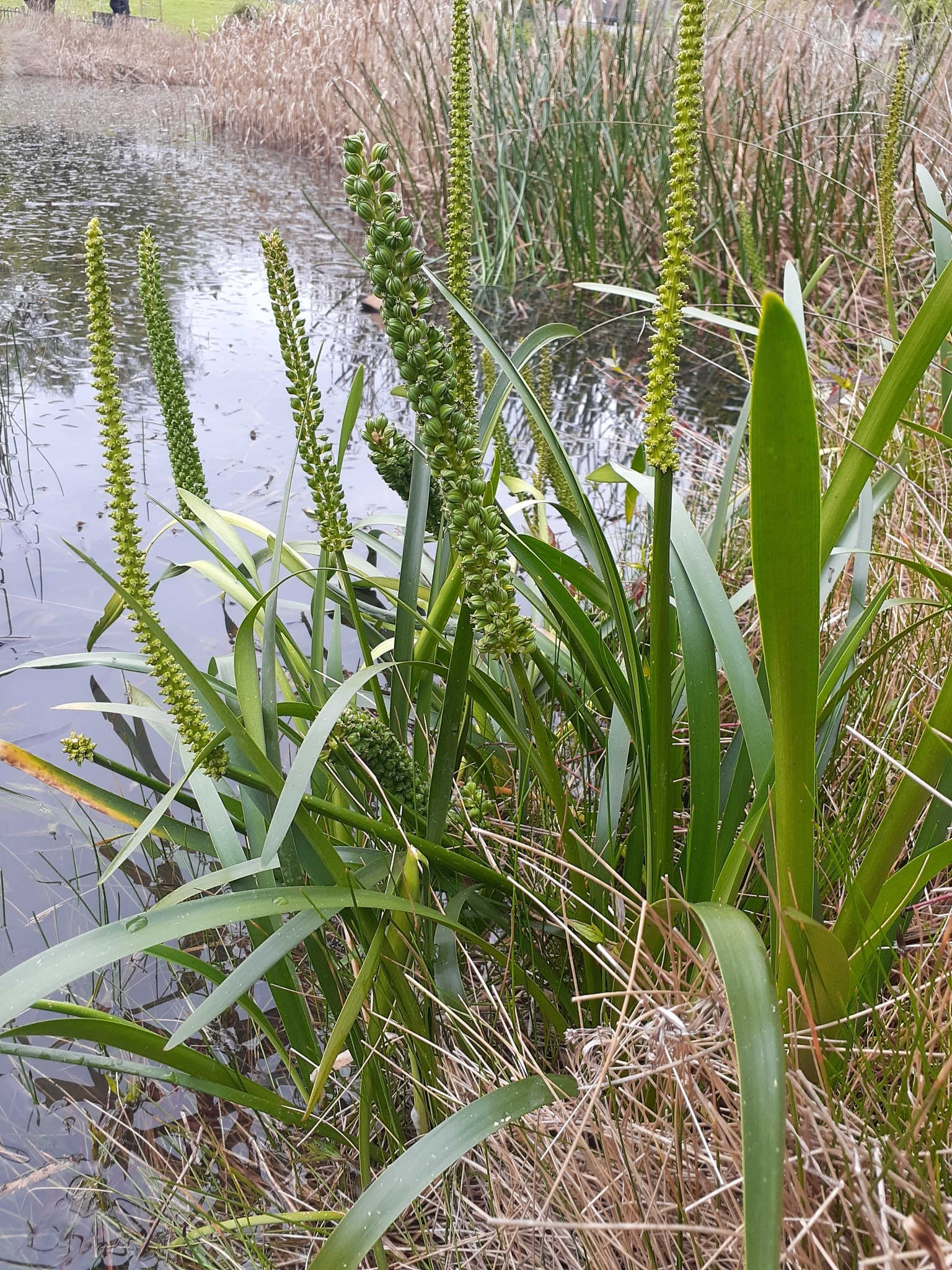
- Cycnogeton procerum on the edge of a pond. Image clearly shows the distinctive inflorescences.

Scientific classification
- Kingdom: Plantae
- Clade: Embryophytes
- Clade: Tracheophytes
- Clade: Angiosperms
- Clade: Monocots
- Order: Alismatales
- Family: Juncaginaceae
- Genus: Cycnogeton
- Species: C. procerum

Binomial name
- Cycnogeton procerum (R.Br.) Buchenau

= Cycnogeton procerum =

Species of aquatic plant

Cycnogeton procerum (formerly Triglochin procera), is an Australian aquatic plant species in the family Juncaginaceae. It is commonly referred to as 'water ribbons', but has many other names in Indigenous Australian languages, including Po-lan-go (Koorie name) and Gabirr (Marra name).

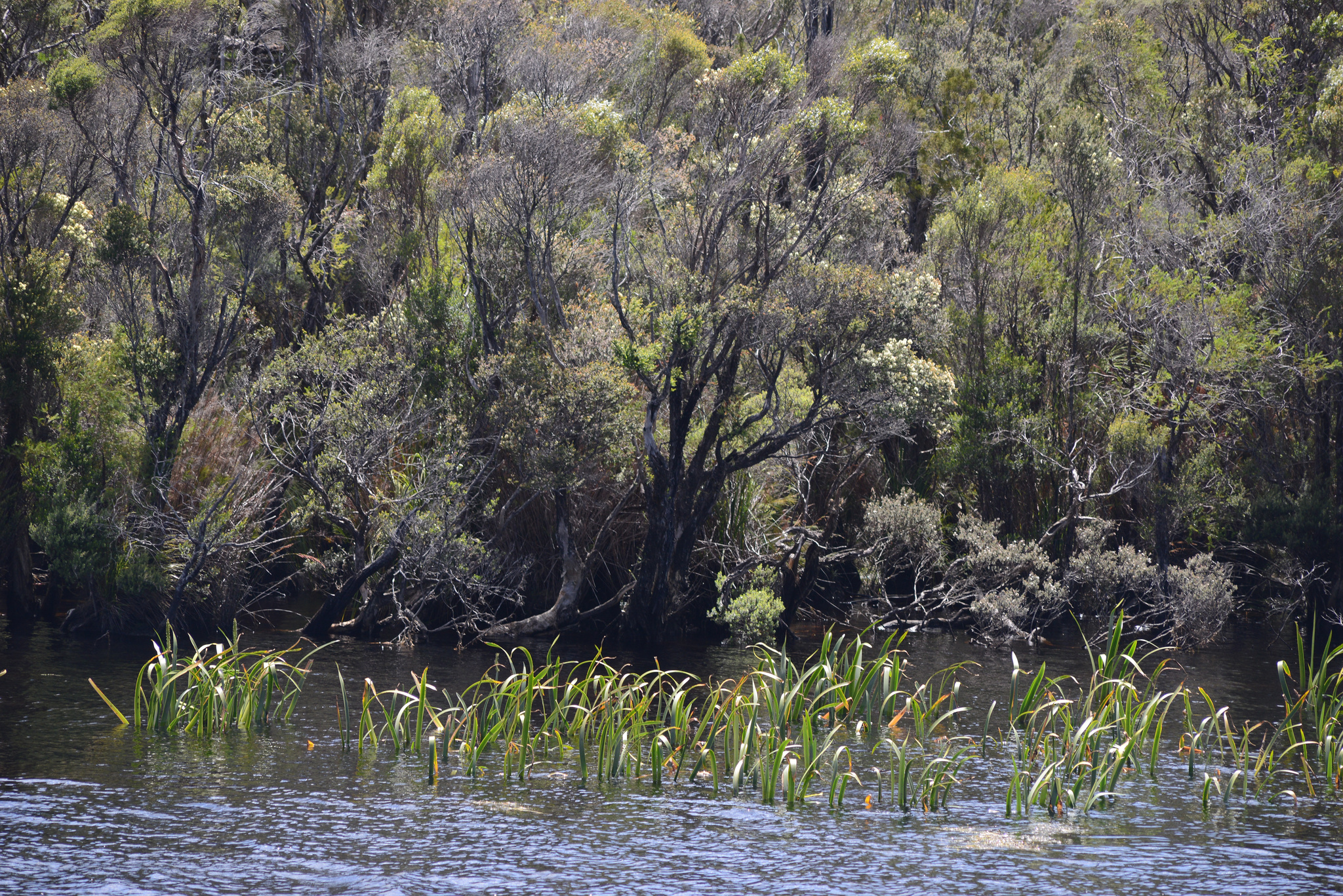

== Description ==
Cycnogeton procerum is a distinctive aquatic herb, with light green, flat and strap-like leaves that often bend down to float in water. It has quite a variable growth habit, partly determined by environmental factors. It has 20–50 cm (8–20 in) erect slender green stems. The Inflorescence are a terminal raceme, dense, long spike that are about 30 cm (12 in) long. Flowers are terminal spikes at the end of the inflorescence, green or white. It can have few to many flowers while its fruit are 1-seeded indehiscent round capsules, 5–10 mm (0.2–0.4 in) long. It has a stout rhizome that supports its growth.

== Phenology ==
Cycnogeton procerum flowers during warmer southern hemisphere months, primarily between September and February, with fruiting occurring between September and March. It is a monoecious species, and reproduces via seed and vegetatively.

== Habitat and distribution ==
Cycnogeton procerum is found in fresh or brackish water, commonly in shallow lakes, ponds or slow-flowing streams. It is native to Australia, commonly occurring in all states, except rarely in Queensland. It is most widespread across South eastern Australia and Tasmania.

== Aboriginal uses ==
Cycnogeton procerum and other similar species were an important food source for Aboriginal Australian people, notably in the coastal areas of Adelaide and surrounding regions. The tubers at the base of the stem were eaten roasted or raw. Some reports say that the tubers are sweet and have a pea-like flavour.

== European cultivation ==
Cycnogeton procerum has been cultivated for its ornamental qualities, especially in aquatic garden settings and water features. It grows well in a variety or garden settings and is commercially available in Australian plant and indigenous nurseries. Ideal growing conditions are in slow-flowing water to 2 m (7 ft) deep with full sun or semi-shaded areas.

== Threats and conservation ==
Currently there is no conservation threat for Cycnogeton procerum in Australia.
