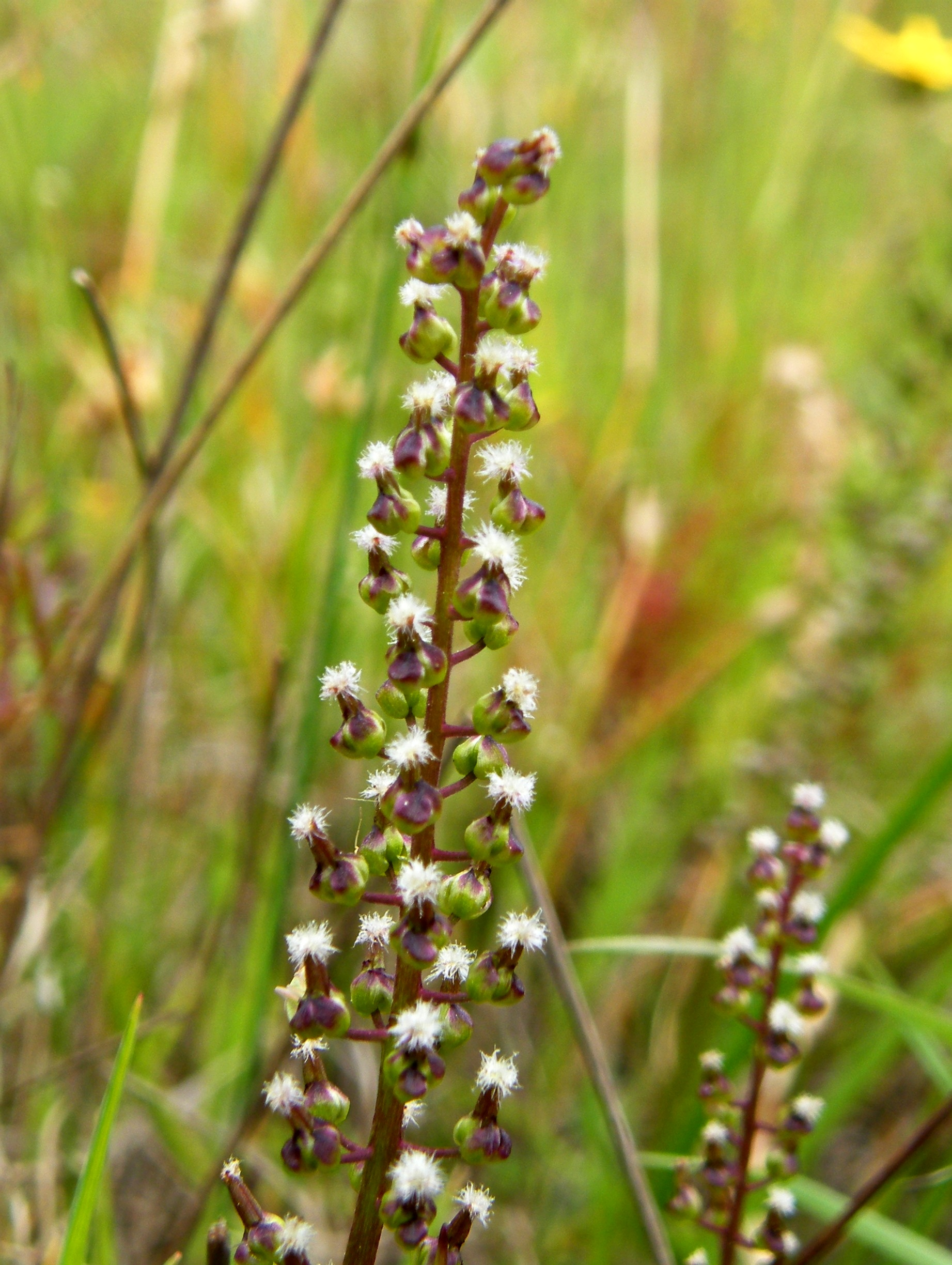

Scientific classification
- Kingdom: Plantae
- Clade: Tracheophytes
- Clade: Angiosperms
- Clade: Monocots
- Order: Alismatales
- Family: Juncaginaceae
- Genus: Triglochin
- Species: T. bulbosa

Binomial name
- Triglochin bulbosa L.

= Triglochin bulbosa =

Species of plant

Triglochin bulbosa is a species of perennial herb in the family Juncaginaceae. They have a self-supporting growth form and simple, broad leaves. They are associated with freshwater habitat.

== Sources ==
This article incorporates text from a free content work. Licensed under CC0 (license statement/permission). Text taken from Triglochin bulbosa. Encyclopedia of Life.
