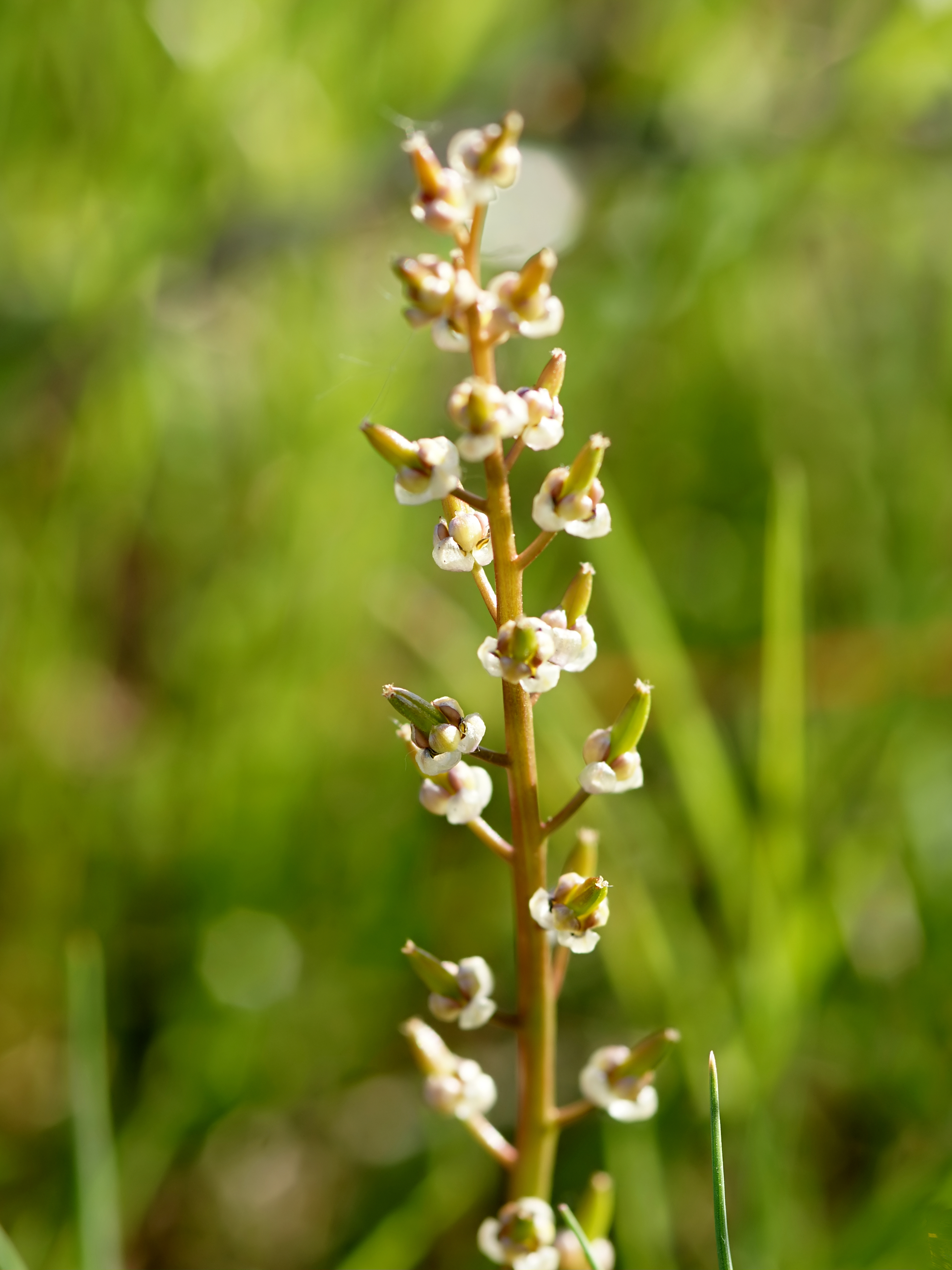

Scientific classification
- Kingdom: Plantae
- Clade: Tracheophytes
- Clade: Angiosperms
- Clade: Monocots
- Order: Alismatales
- Family: Juncaginaceae
- Genus: Triglochin
- Species: T. barrelieri

Binomial name
- Triglochin barrelieri Loisel.
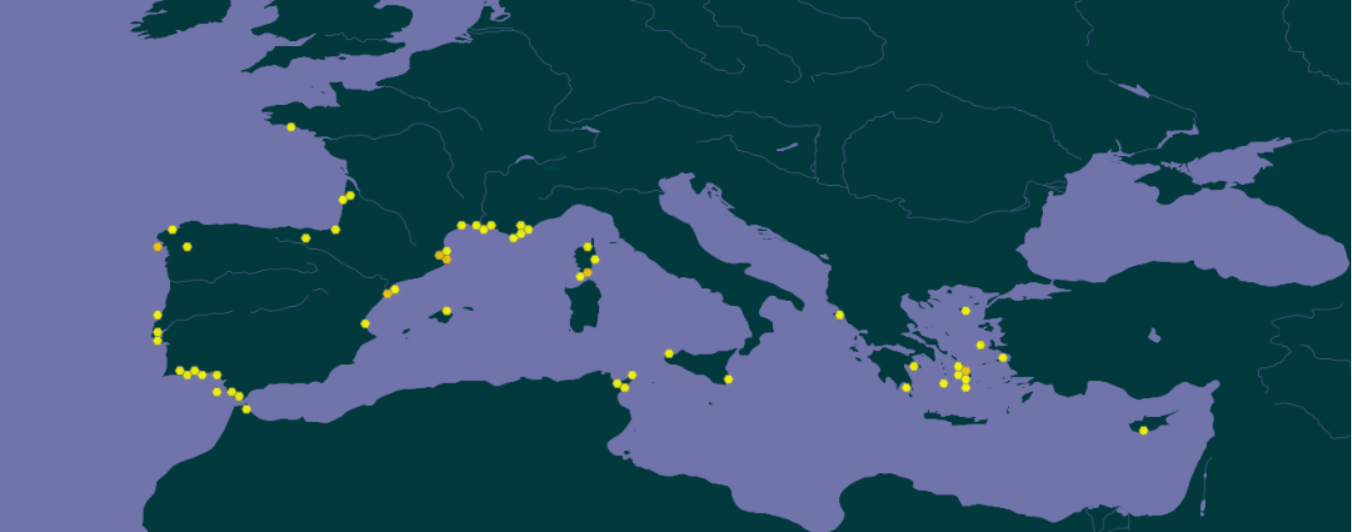
- Distribution map

Synonyms
- Triglochin barrelieri var. maura Pau

= Triglochin barrelieri =

Species of plant

Triglochin barrelieri is a species of plant that belongs to the Juncaginaceae family, usually referred to as the arrowgrass family.

== Description ==
Bulbous arrowgrass is another name for Triglochin barrelieri. Tri-, which means three, and -glochis, which means pointed, are the origins of the name Triglochin, which alludes to the pointy ends of the fruiting ovary. (Origin: Greek) It blooms between March and April. Its blossoms are reported to be unnoticeable and not highly poisonous to other environmental organisms.

== Habitat ==
Water pools on karst limestone, such as those seen on garigue and valley sides, are Malta's preferred habitat. Native to the Maltese Islands, and existed before humans.
