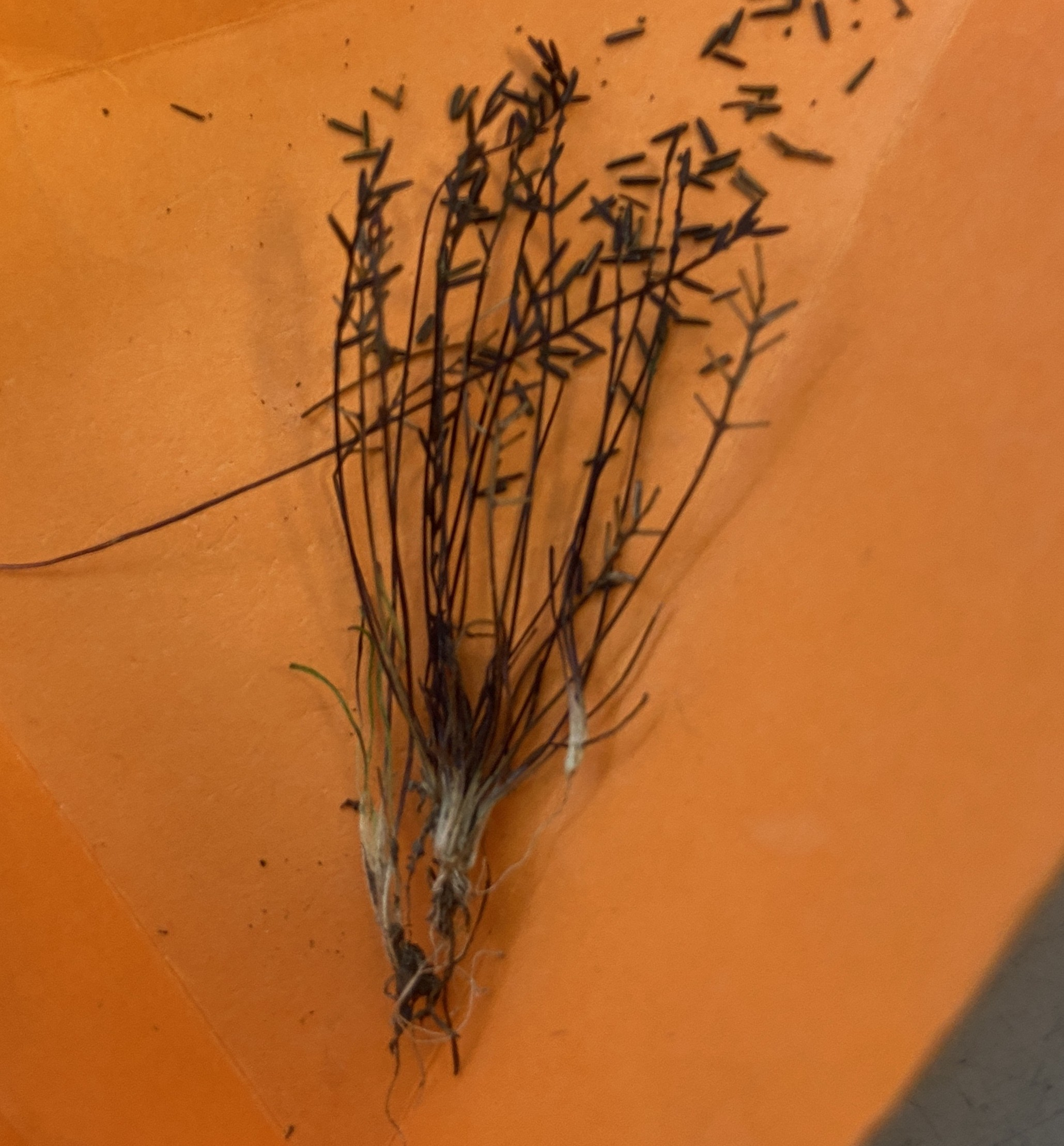
- Triglochin minutissima plant obtained under permit for seed conservation.

Scientific classification
- Kingdom: Plantae
- Clade: Tracheophytes
- Clade: Angiosperms
- Clade: Monocots
- Order: Alismatales
- Family: Juncaginaceae
- Genus: Triglochin
- Species: T. minutissima

Binomial name
- Triglochin minutissima F. Muell, 1867
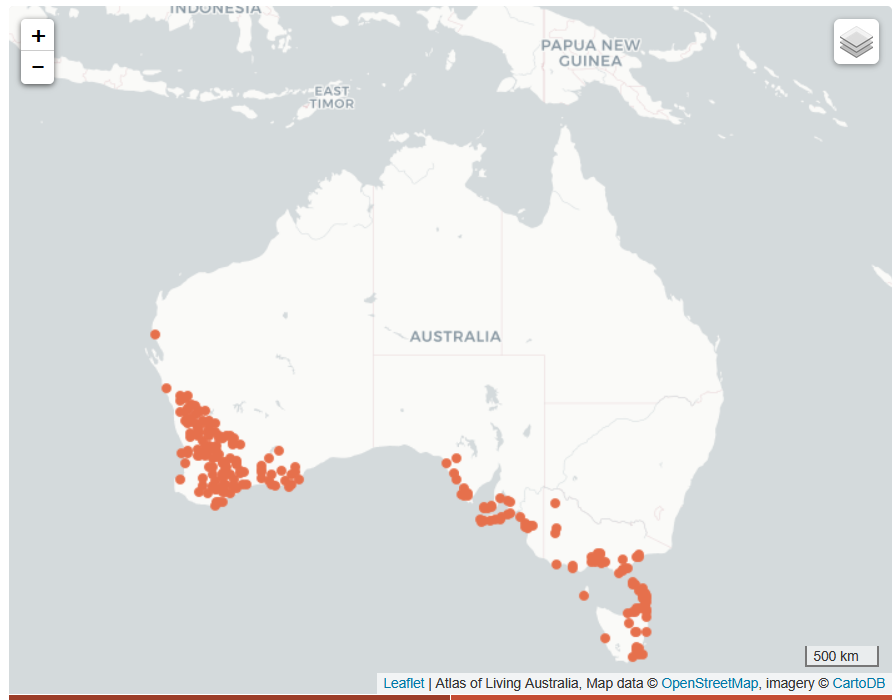
- Distribution map of Triglochin minutissima

Synonyms
- Triglochin minutissimum

= Triglochin minutissima =

Species of flowering plant

Triglochin minutissima, also known as tiny arrowgrass, is a species of flowering plant in the family Juncaginaceae. It is a small, semi-aquatic herb found in wetland habitats in Australia and New Zealand.

== Etymology ==
The genus name "Triglochin" is derived from the Greek treis (three) and glochis (projecting point, barb of an arrow), alluding to the three fertile segments of the fruit in the genus, which resemble an arrowhead. The species epithet "minutissima" is a superlative of the Latin minutus (very small), alluding to the small size of the plant.

== Description ==
Triglochin minutissima is an annual wetland herb growing to heights between 2 and 5 cm (0.79 and 1.97 in). Leaves are cylindrical, typically between 1 and 2 cm (0.39 and 0.79 in) long. Fruits are 1.3 to 1.8 mm (0.051 to 0.071 in) long, and 0.4 to 0.5 mm (0.016 to 0.020 in) wide, and has six carpels, three which are fertile and alternate with three undeveloped sterile carpels, resembling an arrowhead when mature. T. minutissima fruits between August and November.

== Distribution and habitat ==
Triglochin minutissima is native to Australia and New Zealand, where it is commonly found in wetland ecosystems. It thrives in seasonally inundated areas, mudflats, and shallow water bodies, often growing alongside other wetland flora. It is found in mainly coastal areas of Victorian and South Australian, and in both coastal and inland areas of south-west Western Australia. In Tasmania T. minutissima is mainly found in coastal areas of the north-east and south-east main island and coastal areas of the Furneaux Group islands.

== Taxonomy ==
Triglochin minutissima belongs to the genus Triglochin, which comprises various aquatic and semi-aquatic plants known as either arrowgrasses (semi-aquatic) or water ribbons (aquatic). The genus is part of the family Juncaginaceae, which includes many species adapted to wetland environments.

== Ecology ==
The species has been found in concentrations in areas where topsoil has been scraped away, possibly due to the creation of suitable habitat with small depressions that act as small ephemeral wetlands.

== Conservation status ==
The conservation status of Triglochin minutissima varies by region. While it is not considered globally threatened, habitat destruction due to land development and water management practices can impact local populations. In Tasmania, T. minutissima is listed as Rare under the Tasmanian Threatened Species Protection Act 1995.
