= Tristemon =

Tristemon is a taxon synonym for several genera of flowering plants:

- Tristemon Klotzsch, a synonym of Erica Tourn. ex L.
- Tristemon Raf. (1819), nom. nud., a synonym of Triglochin Riv. ex L.
- Tristemon Raf. (1838), a synonym of Juncus L.
- Tristemon Scheele, a synonym of Cucurbita L.
