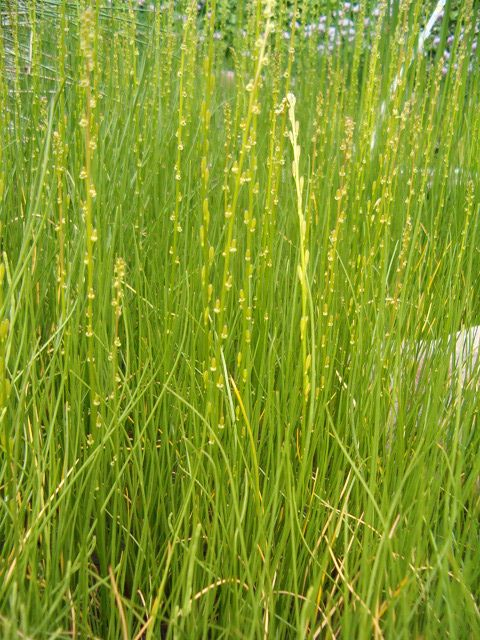

Conservation status
- Secure (NatureServe)

Scientific classification
- Kingdom: Plantae
- Clade: Tracheophytes
- Clade: Angiosperms
- Clade: Monocots
- Order: Alismatales
- Family: Juncaginaceae
- Genus: Triglochin
- Species: T. palustris

Binomial name
- Triglochin palustris L.

Synonyms
- List: Abbotia palustris (L.) Raf. (1836); Juncago palustris (L.) Moench (1794); Triglochin andina Phil. (1873); Triglochin asiatica var. komarovii (Lipsch. & Pavlov) Tzvelev (1984); Triglochin chilensis Meyen (1834); Triglochin crassiculmis (Tzvelev) Prob. (2006); Triglochin fonticola Phil. (1860); Triglochin himalensis Royle (1840); Triglochin juncea Gilib. (1792); Triglochin komarovii Lipsch. & Pavlov (1936); Triglochin palustris var. crassiculmis Tzvelev (1984); Triglochin palustris var. salina Mert. & W.D.J.Koch (1826); Tristemon palustris (L.) Raf. (1819)

= Triglochin palustris =

Marsh arrowgrass

Species of flowering plant in the arrowgrass family

Triglochin palustris or marsh arrowgrass is a species of flowering plant in the arrowgrass family Juncaginaceae. It is found in damp grassland usually on calcareous soils, fens and meadows. The species epithet palustris is Latin for "of the marsh" and indicates its common habitat. It has a circumboreal distribution, occurring throughout northern parts of the Northern Hemisphere. It can be found locally in the British Isles especially the north.

== Description ==
It is a slender perennial herb 15 to 40 cm tall. It has no stolons, and emits a pleasant aromatic smell when bruised.

The leaves are linear, 10 to 20 cm long, rounded on the lower side, deeply grooved on the other. It has many flowers with 6 tepals arranged in a long spike, with purple edged perianth segments, 2 mm long. It flowers from June until August. The fruits are club shaped, 10 mm long and 2 mm wide.

== Similar species ==
Triglochin maritima (sea arrowgrass) is similar but has the following differences: it has stolons, is stouter, has fleshier leaves not furrowed above and is not very aromatic. The raceme is denser and superficially like that of sea plantain.
