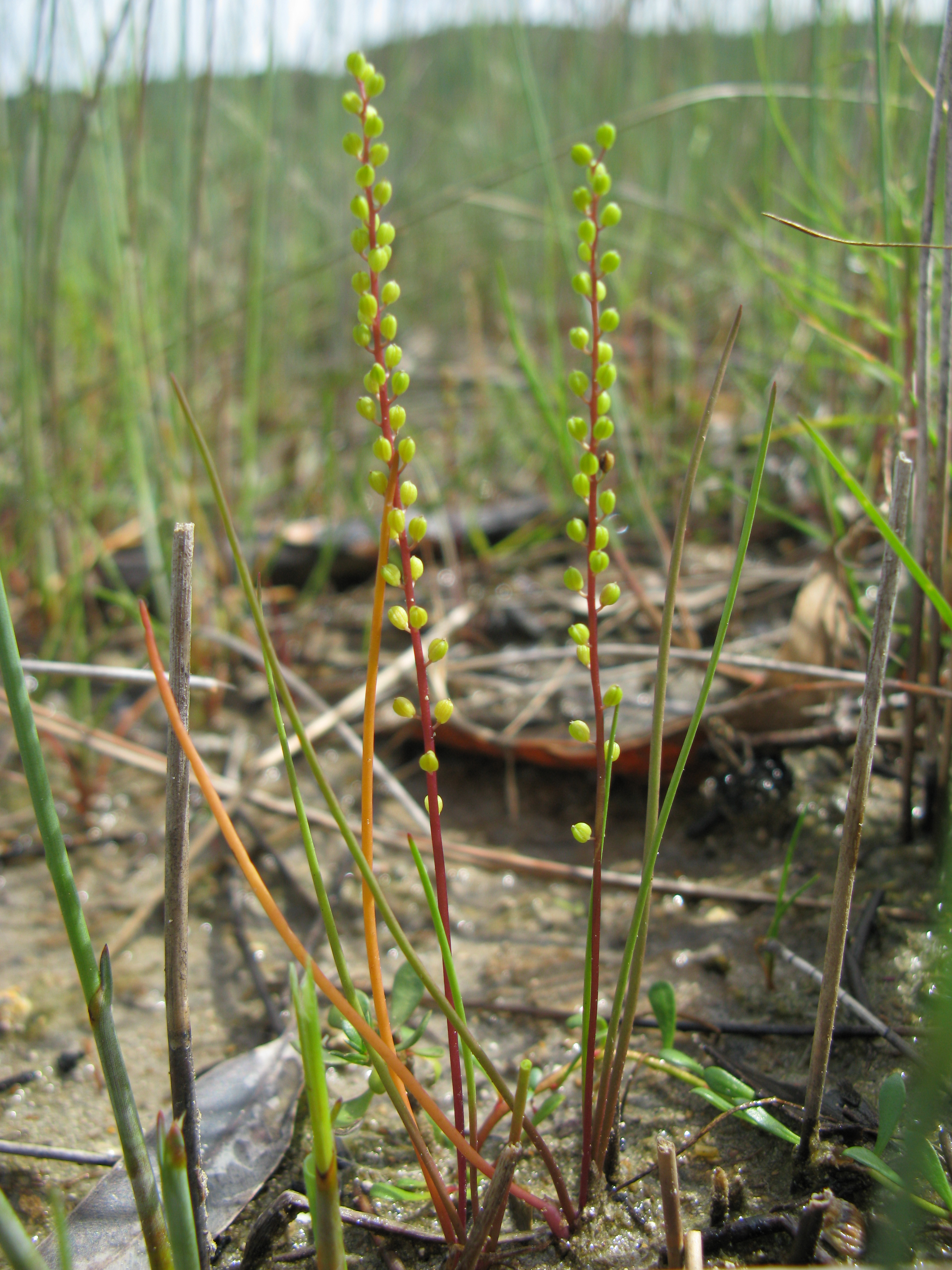

Scientific classification
- Kingdom: Plantae
- Clade: Tracheophytes
- Clade: Angiosperms
- Clade: Monocots
- Order: Alismatales
- Family: Juncaginaceae
- Genus: Triglochin
- Species: T. striata

Binomial name
- Triglochin striata Ruiz & Pav.

Synonyms
- Abbotia filiformis Raf.; Triglochin atacamensis Phil.; Triglochin decipiens R.Br.; Triglochin decipiens f. major Endl.; Triglochin decipiens f. minor Endl.; Triglochin densiflora Dombey ex Kunth; Triglochin filifolia Sieber ex Spreng.; Triglochin flaccida A.Cunn.; Triglochin floridana Gand.; Triglochin lechleri Steud.; Triglochin litorea Phil.; Triglochin littoralis Phil. ex Micheli; Triglochin montevidensis Spreng.; Triglochin natalensis Gand.; Triglochin neozelandica Gand.; Triglochin philippii Gand.; Triglochin pumila Larrañaga; Triglochin pycnostachya Gand.; Triglochin sessilis Gand.; Triglochin striata var. filifolia (Sieber ex Spreng.) Micheli; Triglochin striata var. humilis Micheli; Triglochin striata var. montevidensis (Spreng.) Buchenau; Triglochin striata var. robustior Micheli; Triglochin striata var. triandra (Michx.) Buchenau; Triglochin triandra Michx.; Tristemon triander (Michx.) Raf.

= Triglochin striata =

Species of plant

Triglochin striata is a species of flowering plant in the family Juncaginaceae. It is native to New Zealand, South America, America, Africa, Australia and Southern Portugal.

It is a perennial with parallel lines on its narrow linear leaves, which gives rise to its common name streaked arrow grass. Other common names include three-rib arrowgrass and three-ribbed arrow-grass.

== Habitat ==
Triglochin striata's habitat is mainly coastal in damp muddy ground, salt marsh, estuaries, and damp seepages on coastal cliffs, boulder beaches and within damp coastal turf. It is also found inland around lake margins (in marginal turf communities) and in other suitable damp places, and sometimes even in tall forest.
