= Erna Walter =

German botanist

- Born: Erna Schenck; 11 August 1893; Bonn, Germany
- Died: 2 January 1992 (aged 98)
- Education: University of Heidelberg
- Occupation: Botanist
- Father: Heinrich Schenck

Erna Walter (11 August 1893 in Bonn – 2 January 1992) was a German botanist, ecologist, botanical collector and bryologist.

== Life and work ==
The daughter of botanist Heinrich Schenck, Erna studied botany, physics and chemistry in Darmstadt and Heidelberg. She received her doctorate in 1918 under the direction of botanist Georg Albrecht Klebs at the University of Heidelberg. Her dissertation was titled: Bacteriocine von Clostridium perfringens.

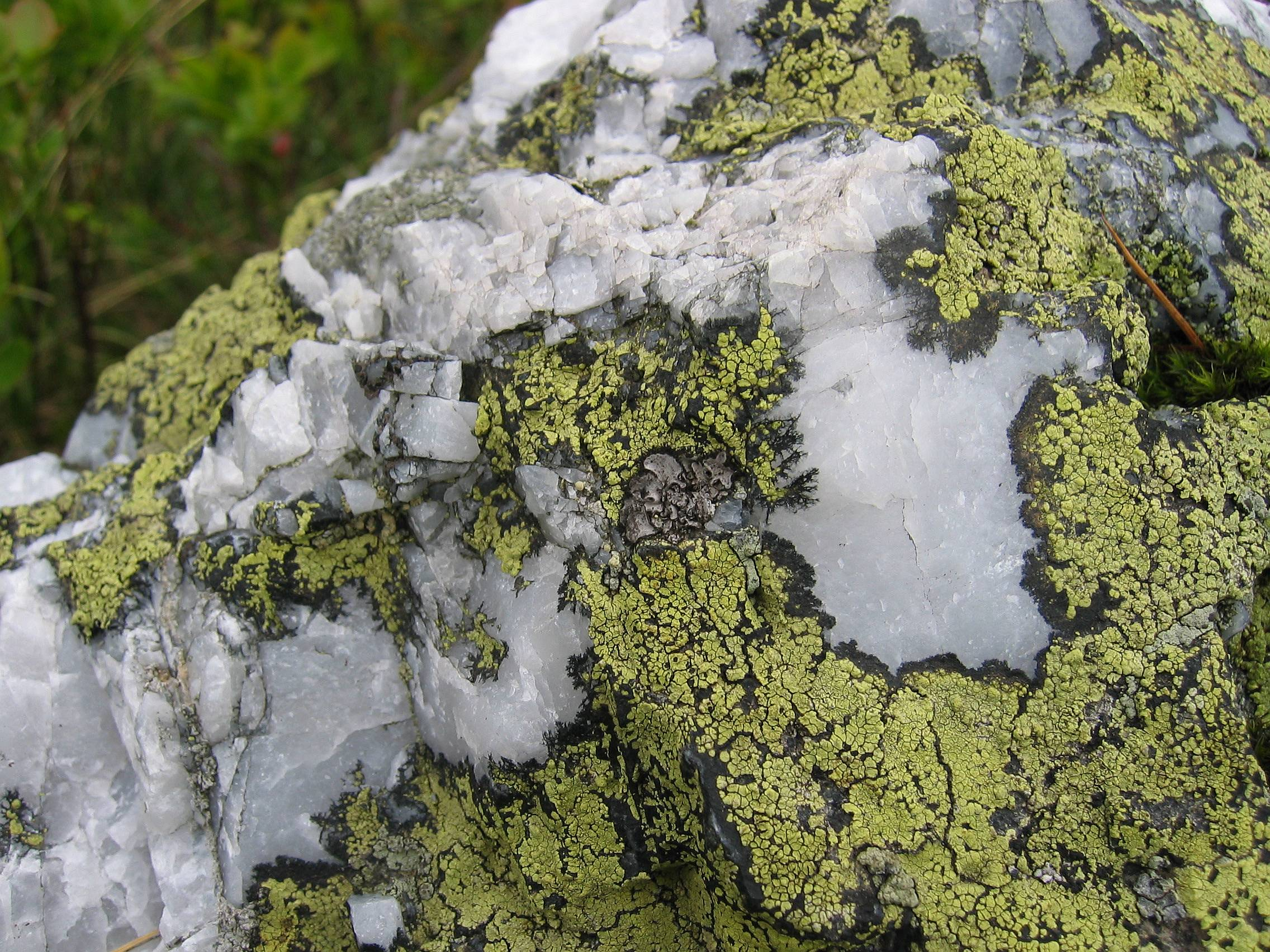
Lichen: Rhizocarpon geographicum on quartz

Walter then worked as a scientific assistant at the Botanical Institute of the University of Heidelberg with Ludwig Jost and as an intern at the Biological Reich Institute in Berlin-Dahlem. She was also an assistant at the Klein Wanzleben sugar factory and at the Oppenheim am Rhein wine school.

In 1924, Walter married geobotanist Heinrich Walter. With him, she undertook numerous research trips to different vegetation zones, during which she concerned herself in particular to lichens and mosses. The couple endeavored to "personally investigate each floral kingdom and climatic zone in the world to obtain comparative material on a global scale." She played an important role in her husband's research and he credited her for that in print.

In addition to her husband, Walter's co-collectors included Kamil Karamanoglu (1920-1976), Charles Killian (1887-1957) and R.P. Maire (fl. 1921). She is credited with 584 specimens collected from at least 16 countries.

Walter's plant finds are kept in the Munich Herbarium and include, among others, mosses and lichens from Argentina, Australia, Chile, Germany, Finland, France, Greece, Italy, Yugoslavia, Canada, Namibia, New Zealand, Norway, Austria, Spain, South Africa, Sweden, Switzerland, Turkey, from the British Isles and Venezuela.

== Selected publications ==
Erna contributed to many of her husband's publications and he mentions her sizeable contributions in some of them, although she was not named a co-author in others.

- Walter, E. (1918). Bacteriocine von Clostridium perfringens
- Walter, H., & Walter, E. (1929). Ökologische Untersuchungen des osmotischen Wertes bei Pflanzen aus der Umgebung des Balatons (Plattensees) in Ungarn während der Dürrezeit 1928. Zeitschrift fur wissenschaftliche Biologie. Abteilung E: Planta, 571–624.
- Walter, H., & Walter, E. (1953). Das Gesetz der relativen Standortskonstanz: Das Wesen der Pflanzengesellschaften. Ber. Dtsch. bot. Ges, 66, 228–236.
