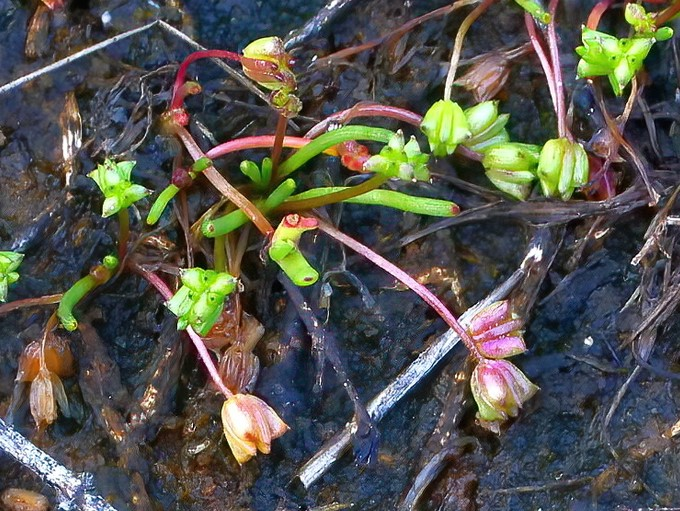

Scientific classification
- Kingdom: Plantae
- Clade: Embryophytes
- Clade: Tracheophytes
- Clade: Spermatophytes
- Clade: Angiosperms
- Clade: Monocots
- Order: Alismatales
- Family: Juncaginaceae
- Genus: Triglochin
- Species: T. mucronata

Binomial name
- Triglochin mucronata R.Br.

Synonyms
- Triglochin calcarata Hook.; Triglochin neesii Endl.

= Triglochin mucronata =

Species of plant

Triglochin mucronata is a salt-tolerant species of herb native to Australia.

== Description ==
Triglochin mucronata grows as an annual herb that sprawls along the ground, reaching a height of no more than 22 centimetres. It has green flowers.

== Taxonomy ==
This species was first described by Robert Brown in 1810. Brown's name has continued to be accepted since publication, but names have twice been published based on specimens of T. mucronata, resulting in the taxonomic synonyms Triglochin calcarata and Triglochin neesii. In 1909, three varieties were proposed but these have not been accepted.

== Distribution and habitat ==
Triglochin mucronata occurs in southern Australia, in the states of Western Australia, South Australia, Victoria and Tasmania. It favours saline areas, such as the coast and inline salt lakes.
