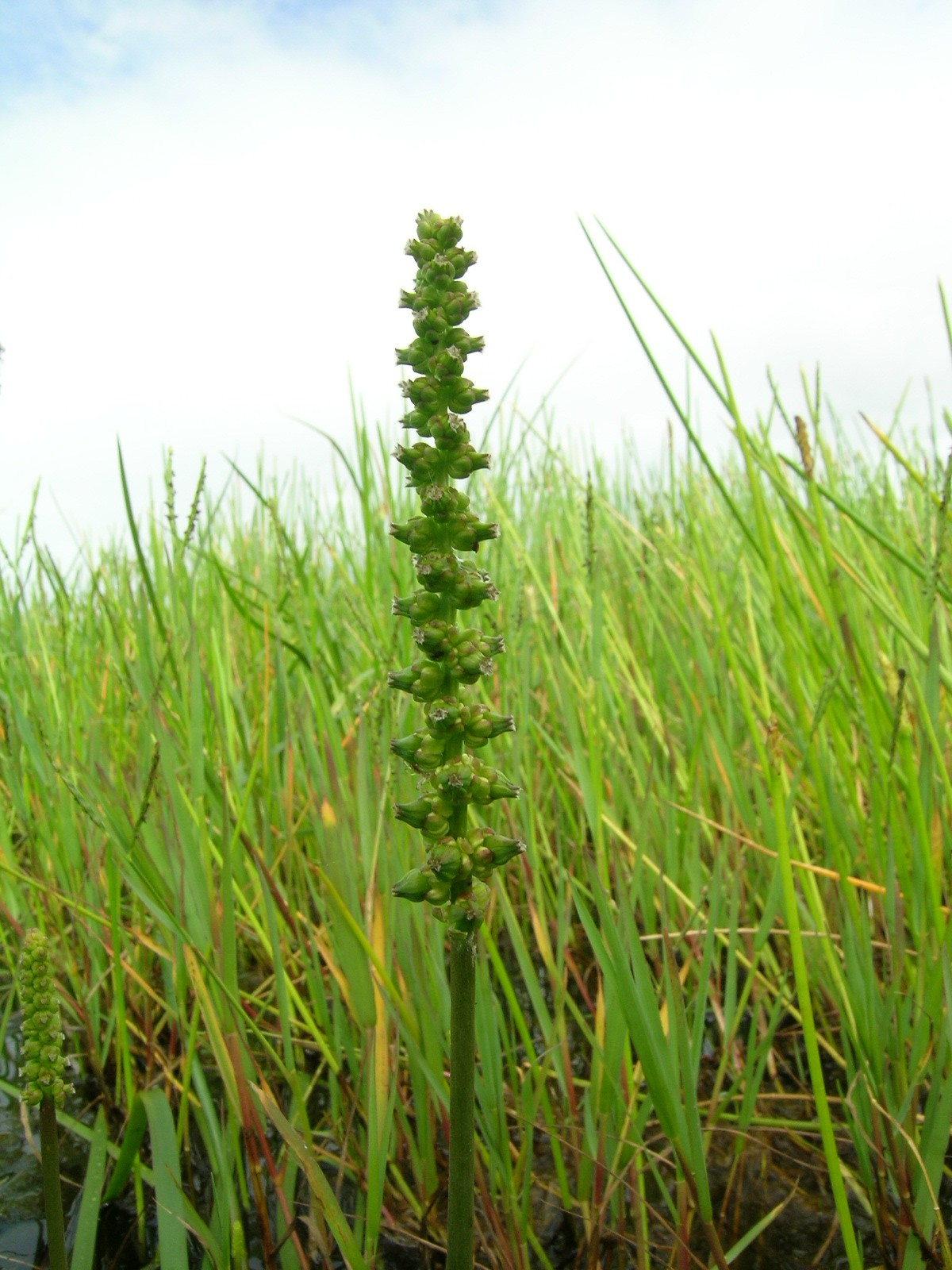
- Cycnogeton procerum

Scientific classification
- Kingdom: Plantae
- Clade: Tracheophytes
- Clade: Angiosperms
- Clade: Monocots
- Order: Alismatales
- Family: Juncaginaceae
- Genus: Cycnogeton; Endl.

= Cycnogeton =

Genus of flowering plants

Cycnogeton is a genus of plants in the family Juncaginaceae described as a genus in 1838. It is native to Australia and New Guinea.

== Species ==
The genus consists of the following species:

- Cycnogeton alcockiae (Aston) Mering & Kadereit - SA TAS VIC
- Cycnogeton dubium (R.Br.) Mering & Kadereit - NG NSW QLD NT VIC WA
- Cycnogeton huegelii Endl. - WA
- Cycnogeton lineare (Endl.) Sond. - WA
- Cycnogeton microtuberosum (Aston) Mering & Kadereit - NSW QLD VIC
- Cycnogeton multifructum (Aston) Mering & Kadereit - NSW QLD VIC SA NT
- Cycnogeton procerum (R.Br.) Buchenau - NSW QLD VIC SA TAS
- Cycnogeton rheophilum (Aston) Mering & Kadereit - NSW QLD VIC TAS

== Use ==
C. dubium (syn. Triglochin dubium) corm is a source of food for the Yolngu.
