= Heinrich Walter =

German botanist (1898–1989)

Heinrich Karl Walter
- Born: 21 October 1898; Odessa
- Died: 15 October 1989 (aged 90); Stuttgart
- Education: University of Odessa; University of Jena
- Occupation: Botanist

Heinrich Karl Walter (21 October 1898 – 15 October 1989) was a German-Russian botanist and eco-physiologist.

== Life ==
Walter, the son of a doctor, was born in Odessa. He studied plant biology at the University of Odessa from 1915 to 1917. In 1918 he moved to the University of Dorpat, where he studied under Peter Claussen. In 1919 he studied at the University of Jena with Christian Ernst Stahl and Wilhelm Detmer, where he completed his Ph.D. In 1920, he worked at the Agricultural Research Institute in Halle, and then as a research assistant of Ludwig Jost at the University of Heidelberg.

In 1923, Walter worked as a lecturer at the university and he became an Associate Professor of Botany in 1927. In 1924, he married the daughter of the botanist Heinrich Schenck, Erna Walter, who also earned her doctorate in botany from the University of Heidelberg (in 1918) and was a research assistant of Ludwig Jost. In the following years, Walter received a Rockefeller Fellowship (1929-1930) for the exploration of desert plants with American botanist Forrest Shreve in Tucson, Arizona as well as with John Ernest Weaver, a plant ecologist in Lincoln, Nebraska. In 1939, Walter became Director of the Botanical Institute of the Institute of Technology (now University) in Stuttgart. From 1933 to 1934, and again from 1937 to 1938, Walter made research trips to East and West Africa. In 1941, he became a tenured professor at the State University of Poznan, and in 1945 he worked at the Department of Botany at the Agricultural University of Stuttgart-Hohenheim, where Walter eventually retired and became an emeritus professor in 1966. From 1951 to 1955 he was a visiting professor of botany at the University of Ankara in Turkey. He died in Stuttgart in 1989.

== Law of relative constancy of habitat ==
In 1953, Walter and Erna formulated the Law of relative constancy of habitat, which states that: If the climate within the residential district or area of a plant species is changing in a particular direction, this species moves into a habitat or biotope that compensates for the climate change.

== Research achievements ==
Walter went on numerous research trips, on which he was most often accompanied by his wife, to almost all vegetation zones on the earth. He recorded his experiences and summarized his findings in many books. The sometimes very extensive works are often published in several editions, have been translated in part, and belong almost exclusively to the standard works of Geobotany and Ecology (review in his memoirs).

Walter acquired extraordinary merits through the collaboration with Helmut Lieth in the published work "Climate Chart World Atlas" (1960-1967). This work was a clear form of climate representation and received the highest international recognition. Characterized by its holistic approach, this atlas also included a new biome classification system, which bridged the gap between regional macroclimates and vegetation physiognomy. Walter and Lieth categorized nine specific zonobiomes using their graphic representation of climate data on monthly temperature and precipitation averages to delineate their global geographical distribution. Their framework clearly illustrates how seasonality, water availability, and temperature limits combine to foster distinct ecological communities.

Number	Zonobiome	Zonal soil type	Zonal vegetation type
ZB I	Equatorial, always moist, little temperature seasonality	Equatorial brown clays	Evergreen tropical rainforest
ZB II	Tropical, summer rainy season and cooler "winter" dry season	Red clays or red earths	Tropical seasonal forest, seasonal dry forest, scrub, or savanna
ZB III	Subtropical, highly seasonal, arid climate	Serosemes, sierozemes	Desert vegetation with considerable exposed surface
ZB IV	Mediterranean, winter rainy season and summer drought	Mediterranean brown earths	Sclerophyllous (drought-adapted), frost-sensitive shrublands and woodlands
ZB V	Warm temperate, occasional frost, often with summer rainfall maximum	Yellow or red forest soils, slightly podsolic soils	Temperate evergreen forest, somewhat frost-sensitive
ZB VI	Nemoral, moderate climate with winter freezing	Forest brown earths and grey forest soils	Frost-resistant, deciduous, temperate forest
ZB VII	Continental, arid, with warm or hot summers and cold winters	Chernozems to serozems	Grasslands and temperate deserts
ZB VIII	Boreal, cold temperate with cool summers and long winters	Podsols	Evergreen, frost-hardy, needle-leaved forest (taiga)
ZB IX	Polar, short, cool summers and long, cold winters	Tundra humus soils with solifluction (permafrost soils)	Low, evergreen vegetation, without trees, growing over permanently frozen soils

The memoirs of Walter (Confessions of an Environmentalist, 1980) is an impressive document of the times and at the same time an informative source for the history of science. In the final chapter of this book, he also deals with the relationship of science and art and provides an opinion on the basic questions of scientific work.

== Staff and students ==
During his time as a professor, Walter had numerous employees and students who themselves became professors later. Among others, some noteworthy scientists were: Hans Haas, Maximilian Steiner, Erich Oberdorfer, Karl Hans Divine, Heinz Ellenberg, Karlheinz Kreeb, Helmut Lieth, Wolfgang Haber, Helmut Freitag and Sigmar Breckle.

== Publications ==
In German:

- Walter, H. 1946-1963. Einführung in die Phytologie. 4 Bände in 6. Verlag: Eugen Ulmer.
  - Bd. I: Grundlagen des Pflanzenlebens: Einführung in die allgemeine Botanik für Studierende der Hochschulen. 1st ed., 1946; 2nd ed., 1947; 3rd ed., 1950; 4th ed., 1962.
  - Bd. II: Grundlagen des Pflanzensystems. 1st ed., 1948; 2nd ed, 1952; 3rd ed., 1961.
  - Bd. III: Grundlagen der Pflanzenverbreitung: 1. Teil: Standortslehre. Analytisch-ökologische Geobotanik. 1st ed., 1951; 2nd ed., 1960.
  - Bd. III: Grundlagen der Pflanzenverbreitung: 2. Teil: Arealkunde. Floristisch-historische Geobotanik. 1st ed., 1954; 2nd ed., 1970 [with H. Straka].
  - Bd. IV: Grundlagen der Vegetationsgliederung: 1. Teil: Aufgaben und Methoden der Vegetationskunde. 1956 [by H. Ellenberg].
  - Bd. IV: Grundlagen der Vegetationsgliederung: 2. Teil: Vegetation Mitteleuropas mit den Alpen in Ökologischer Sicht. 1st ed., 1963 [by H. Ellenberg]; 2nd ed., 1978; 3rd ed., 1982; 4th ed., 1986; 5th ed., 1996; 6th ed., 2010 [by H. Ellenberg & C. Leuschner].
- Walter, H. 1954. Klimax und zonale Vegetation. Angewandte Pflanzensoziologie, Festschrift für Erwin Aichinger 1: 144-150.
- Walter, H. & Lieth, H. 1960-1973. Klimadiagramm-Weltatlas. In drei Lieferungen mit etwa 8000 Klimastationen (etwa 9000 Diagramme). Gustav Fischer Verlag, Jena.
- Walter, H. 1962-1973. Die Vegetation der Erde in Öko-physiologischer Betrachtung. [2 vol.].
  - Vol. 1, Die tropischen und subtropischen Zonen, 1962, 538 pp.; 2nd ed., 1964; 3rd. ed., 1973, 743 pp.
  - Vol. 2, Die gemäßigten und arktischen Zonen, 1968, 1001 pp.
- Walter, H. 1970. Vegetationszonen und Klima. Verlag Eugen Ulmer, Stuttgart, 382 pp. [abridged version of Die Vegetation der Erde; 2nd ed., 1973; 3rd ed., 1977; 4th ed, 1979, renamed Vegetation und Klimazonen; 5th ed., 1984; 6th ed., 1990; 7th ed., 1999, with S.-W. Breckle].
- Walter, H. 1973. Allgemeine Geobotanik. Ulmer, Stuttgart. UTB 284, 256 pp.
- Walter, H., Harnickell, E. & Müller-Dombois, D. 1975. Klimadiagramm-Karten. Gustav Fischer Verlag, Stuttgart, 36 pp.
- Walter, H. 1976. Die ökologischen Systeme der Kontinente (Biogeosphäre). Prinzipien ihrer Gliederung mit Beispielen. Fischer Verlag, Stuttgart, 131 pp.
- Walter, H. 1980. Bekenntnisse eines Ökologen. Erlebtes in acht Jahrzehnten und auf Forschungsreisen in allen Erdteilen mit Schlussfolgerungen. [Confessions of an Ecologist. Experiences during eight decades and on research tours on all continents]. Stuttgart: Fischer. [6th ed., 1989]. ISBN 3-437-30605-7.
- Walter, H. & Breckle, S-W. 1983-1991. Ökologie der Erde. Stuttgart. [4 vol., revised edition of Die Vegetation der Erde].
  - Bd. 1, Ökologische Grundlagen in globaler Sicht, 1983; 2nd ed., 1991.
  - Bd. 2, Spezielle Ökologie der Tropen und Subtropen, 1984; 2nd ed., 1991; 3rd ed., 2004
  - Bd. 3, Spezielle Ökologie der Gemäßigten und Arktischen Zonen Euro-Nordasiens, 1986; 2nd ed., 1994.
  - Bd. 4, Spezielle Ökologie der Gemäßigten und Arktischen Zonen außerhalb Euro-Nordasiens, 1989[1991?].

In English:

- Walter, H. 1971. Ecology of tropical and subtropical vegetation. Edinburgh: Oliver & Boyd, 539 p. [transl. of vol. 1 of Die Vegetation der Erde]
- Walter, H. 1973. Vegetation of the earth in relation to climate and the eco-physiological conditions. New York: Springer-Verlag, 237 pp. [transl. of Vegetationszonen und Klima; 2nd ed. 1979, renamed Vegetation of the earth and ecological systems of the geo-biosphere; 3rd ed., 1985; 4th ed., 2002, retitled Walter's vegetation of the earth: the ecological systems of the geo-biosphere.].
- Walter, H., Harnickell, E. & Mueller-Dombois, D. 1975. Climate-diagram maps of the individual continents and the ecological climatic regions of the earth (supplement to the vegetation monographs). Springer-Verlag: New York.
- Walter, H. & Breckle, S.-W. 1985-1989. Ecological Systems of the Geobiosphere. 3 vols. Springer-Verlag: Berlin. [transl. of Ökologie der Erde.]
  - Vol. 1, Ecological Principles in Global Perspective, 1985.
  - Vol. 2, Tropical and Subtropical Zonobiomes, 1986.
  - Vol. 3, Temperate and Polar Zonobiomes of Northern Eurasia, 1989.

== Quotations ==
While writing the preface of many of his books, Walter quotes: "Das Laboratorium des Ökologen ist Gottes Natur Und sein Arbeitsfeld—die ganze Welt." (The ecologist's laboratory is God's nature and the whole earth is his field.)
