= Cycnogeton alcockiae =

Scientific classification
- Kingdom: Plantae
- Clade: Tracheophytes
- Clade: Angiosperms
- Clade: Monocots
- Order: Alismatales
- Family: Juncaginaceae
- Genus: Cycnogeton
- Species: C. alcockiae

Binomial name
- Cycnogeton alcockiae (Aston) Mering & Kadereit

Synonyms
- Triglochin alcockiae Aston

Species of plant

Cycnogeton alcockiae, also known as southern water-ribbons, Alcock's water-ribbons or dwarf water-ribbons, is a plant in the arrowgrass family native to south-eastern Australia, where it has been recorded from South Australia, Tasmania and Victoria. It is found in freshwater and brackish wetland communities, in pools, swamps and the margins of streams, where it grows to about 20 cm in height. The fruit is a papery capsule.

The species was first described as Triglochin alcockiae by Helen Aston in 1993, with the species epithet honouring Kath Alcock, a botanical collector and orchid artist of Narracoorte. In 2010, the species was transferred to the genus, Cycnogeton.
