= Triglochin trichophora =

Scientific classification
- Kingdom: Plantae
- Clade: Embryophytes
- Clade: Tracheophytes
- Clade: Spermatophytes
- Clade: Angiosperms
- Clade: Monocots
- Order: Alismatales
- Family: Juncaginaceae
- Genus: Triglochin
- Species: T. trichophora

Binomial name
- Triglochin trichophora Nees ex Endl.

Species of plant

Triglochin trichophora is an annual herb native to Australia.

== Description ==
It grows as an annual herb from 5 to 15 centimetres in height.

== Taxonomy ==
This species was published in 1846 by Christian Gottfried Daniel Nees von Esenbeck. It has had an uneventful taxonomic history.

== Distribution and habitat ==
It grows in swamps and coastal areas of Western Australia, South Australia and Victoria.
