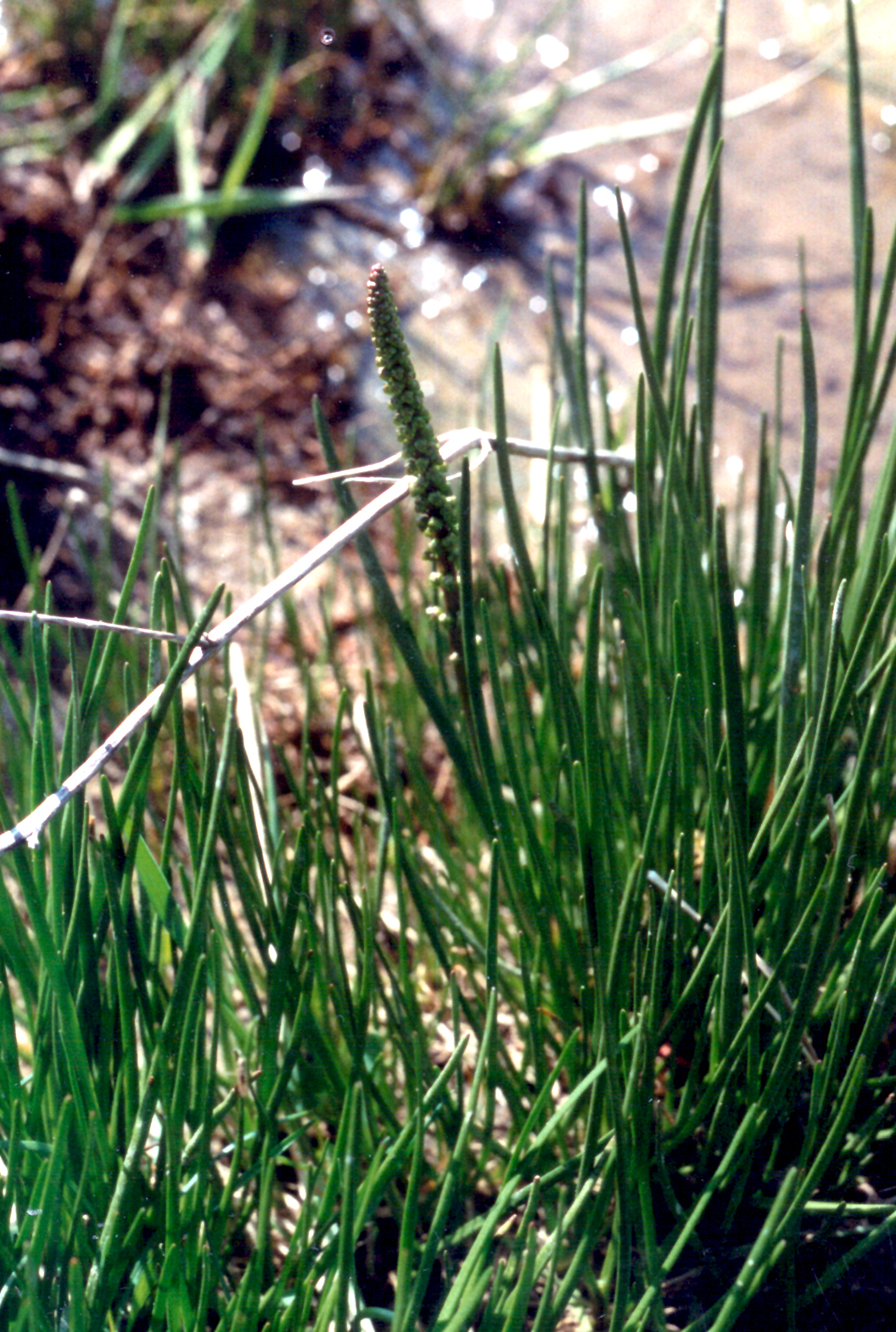

Conservation status
- Secure (NatureServe)

Scientific classification
- Kingdom: Plantae
- Clade: Tracheophytes
- Clade: Angiosperms
- Clade: Monocots
- Order: Alismatales
- Family: Juncaginaceae
- Genus: Triglochin
- Species: T. maritima

Binomial name
- Triglochin maritima L., 1753

Synonyms
- List: Hexaglochin maritima (L.) Nieuwl. (1913); Hexaglochin sexlocularis (Stokes) Nieuwl. (1913); Juncago maritima (L.) Bubani (1901); Triglochin ani K.Koch (1849); Triglochin asiatica (Kitag.) Á.Löve & D.Löve (1958); Triglochin concinna Burtt Davy (1895); Triglochin concinna var. debilis (M.E.Jones) J.T.Howell (1947); Triglochin concinna var. deserticola (Phil.) J.T.Howell (1947); Triglochin debilis (M.E.Jones) Á.Löve & D.Löve (1958); Triglochin elata Nutt. (1818); Triglochin maritima var. altoandina Cabrera (1957); Triglochin maritima var. asiatica (Kitag.) Ohwi (1953); Triglochin maritima subsp. asiatica Kitag. (1939); Triglochin maritima var. debilis M.E.Jones (1895); Triglochin maritima var. deserticola Phil. (1891); Triglochin maritima var. deserticola Buchenau (1903); Triglochin maritima var. elata (Nutt.) A.Gray (1856); Triglochin monanthos Speg. (1924); Triglochin narbonensis Sennen (1901); Triglochin roegneri K.Koch (1849); Triglochin salina Wallr. (1840); Triglochin sexlocularis Stokes (1812); Triglochin transcaucasica Bordz. (1912)

= Triglochin maritima =

Sea arrowgrass

Species of flowering plant in the arrowgrass family

Triglochin maritima is a species of flowering plant in the arrowgrass family Juncaginaceae. It is found in brackish marshes, freshwater marshes, wet sandy beaches, fens, damp grassland and bogs. It has a circumboreal distribution, occurring throughout the northern Northern Hemisphere. In the British Isles it is common on the coast, but very rare inland.

== Description ==
It is similar to marsh arrowgrass (Triglochin palustris) but has the following differences: it has stolons, is stouter. The leaves are fleshy and not furrowed above. It is not very aromatic. The raceme is more dense and like sea plantain. The flowers are fleshier. The fruits are oval, 4 mm long, 2 mm wide.

It varies in height from 200–750 mm (8–30 in). It flowers in May to August; flowers are greenish, 3 petalled, edged with purple, 3 mm (1/8 in) across, in a long spike. Common names include seaside arrowgrass, common arrowgrass, sea arrowgrass and shore arrowgrass.

It can be an annual or perennial.

Triglochin concinna is a synonym of this species.

This plant is believed to be toxic, as it can produce cyanide. However, this is usually when the plant is distressed in drought conditions or due to over harvesting, usually by grazing animals. There is a common belief that this species has been known to cause losses in cattle, with green leaves being more toxic than dried material, yet sheep and deer graze on the plant, especially in rural seaside areas. It could be that belief in the plants' toxicity is apocryphal and based on anecdotal evidence.
