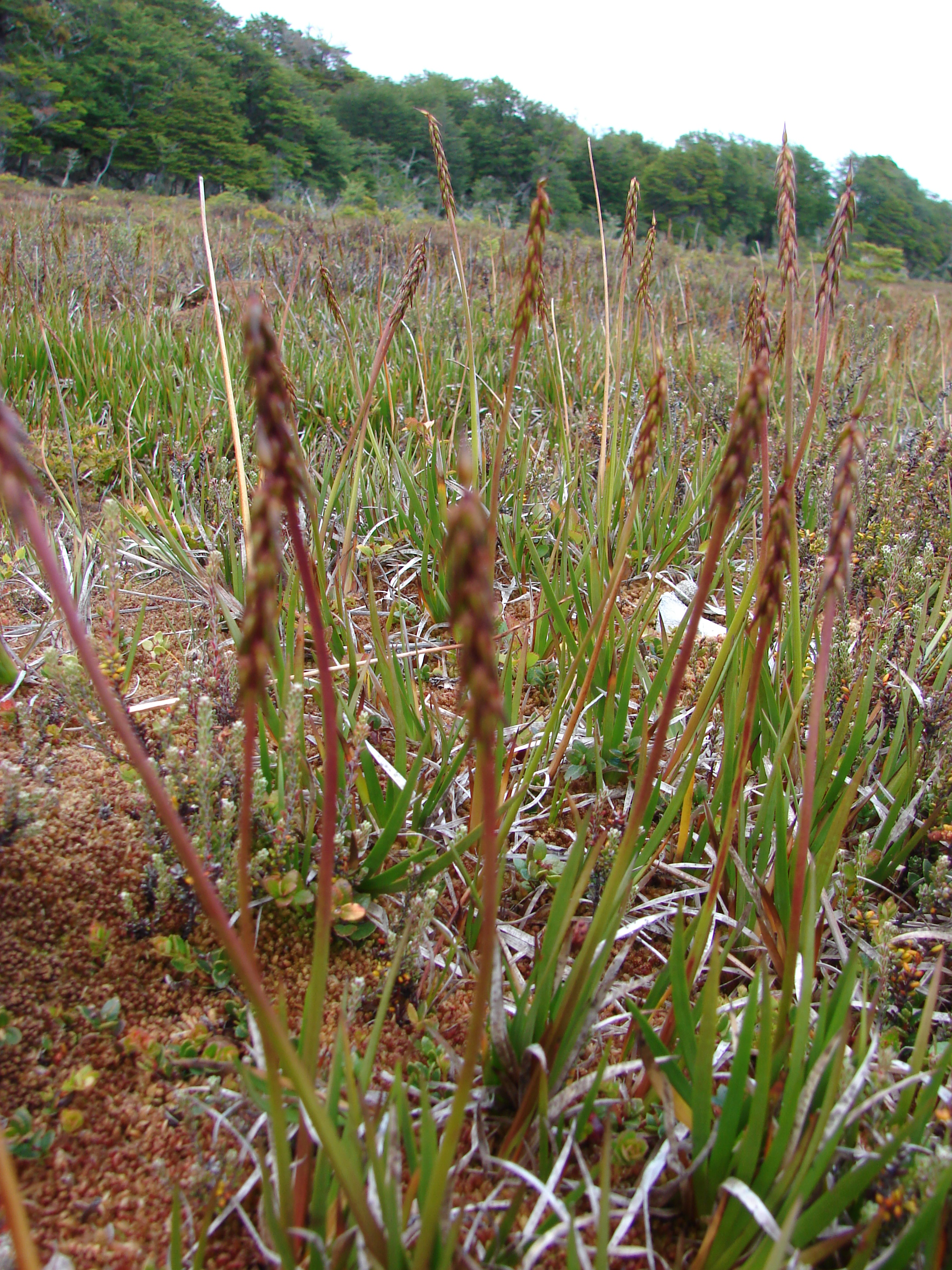

Scientific classification
- Kingdom: Plantae
- Clade: Tracheophytes
- Clade: Angiosperms
- Clade: Monocots
- Order: Alismatales
- Family: Juncaginaceae
- Genus: Tetroncium; Willd.
- Species: T. magellanicum

Binomial name
- Tetroncium magellanicum Willd.

Synonyms
- Cathanthes Rich.; Triglochin magellanica Vahl ex Kunth; Triglochin reflexa Vahl. ex Kunth

= Tetroncium =

Genus of flowering plants

Tetroncium is a genus of plants in the Juncaginaceae described as a genus in 1808. It contains only one known species, Tetroncium magellanicum, known from a few sub-Antarctic islands: Tierra Del Fuego (Chile and Argentina), Falkland Islands, and Gough Island. The plant got the name magellanicum because the original description was describing the sample found near the Strait of Magellan.
