= Helmut Lieth =

German botanist (1925–2015)

- Born: 16 December 1925; Steeg, Prussia, Weimar Republic
- Died: 16 April 2015 (aged 89); Steeg, North Rhine-Westphalia, Germany
- Education: University of Cologne
- Known for: Climate diagrams
- Spouse: Magdalena Roth
- Children: 4
- Scientific career
- Fields: phytogeography, ecology, botany
- Workplaces: University of Stuttgart-Hohenheim, University of Hawaii, University of North Carolina, University of Osnabrück
- Thesis: (1953)
- Author abbrev. (botany): Lieth

Friedrich Heinrich Helmut Lieth (16 December 1925 – 16 April 2015) was a German ecologist, botanist and phytogeographer.

== Biography ==
Lieth received his doctorate in Biology from the University of Cologne in 1953 and became a private lecturer at the University of Stuttgart-Hohenheim in 1960. He was then a visiting professor in Venezuela, Colombia, and in 1966 at the University of Hawaii. He was professor at the University of North Carolina at Chapel Hill from 1967 to 1977. From then until 1992 he was a professor at the University of Osnabrück where he held the chair of ecology.

Helmut Lieth married Magdalena Roth in 1952. The couple had a daughter (Dr. Margot Lieth) and three sons (Prof. Dr. Johann Heinrich Lieth, Dr. Erich Lieth and Armin Lieth); he also had a daughter (Masha) from a second marriage to Marina Mochtchenko.

== Research ==
Lieth became widely known through the climate diagram world atlas published together with Heinrich Walter between 1960 and 1967. The descriptive form of climate display (the Walter-Lieth climate diagram ) conceived here received the highest international recognition.

His work on use of geospatial mapping (Lieth 1974, 1975) resulted in many computer-generated maps and was the pioneering work that is today commonly referred to as Graphical Information Systems (GIS).

== Selected works ==
- Walter, Heinrich; Rehder, Helmut; Harnickell, Elisabeth; Lieth, Helmut (1967). Klimadiagramm-Weltatlas [Climate diagram world atlas] (in German). Jena: Gustav Fischer Verlag. OCLC 174864785. with around 8,000 climate stations (around 9,000 diagrams), 33 main maps, 22 secondary maps; published in 3 issues
- Lieth, H., ed. (1974). Phenology and Seasonality Modeling (1 ed.). e-book published: 9 March 2013 ISBN 9783642518638
  - Lieth, H. (1974), "Purposes of a Phenology Book", in Lieth, H. (ed.), Phenology and Seasonality Modeling, Ecological Studies, vol. 8, Berlin, Heidelberg: Springer, pp. 3–19, doi:10.1007/978-3-642-51863-8_1, ISBN 978-3-642-51865-2
- Lieth, Helmut; Whittaker, Robert Harding, eds. (1975). Primary Productivity of the Biosphere (1 ed.). Springer-Verlag. ISBN 9783540070832. republished 2011, 2012
  - Lieth, H. (1975), "Modeling the Primary Productivity of the World.", in Lieth, H.; Whittaker, R.H. (eds.), Primary Productivity of the Biosphere, Ecological Studies, vol. 14, Berlin, Heidelberg: Springer, pp. 237–263, doi:10.1007/978-3-642-80913-2_12, ISBN 978-3-642-80915-6
- Schlüter, Maja; Savitsky, Andre G.; McKinney, Daene C.; Lieth, Helmut (2005). "Optimizing long-term water allocation in the Amudarya River delta: a water management model for ecological impact assessment". Environmental Modelling & Software. 20 (5): 529–545. Bibcode:2005EnvMS..20..529S. doi:10.1016/j.envsoft.2004.03.005.
