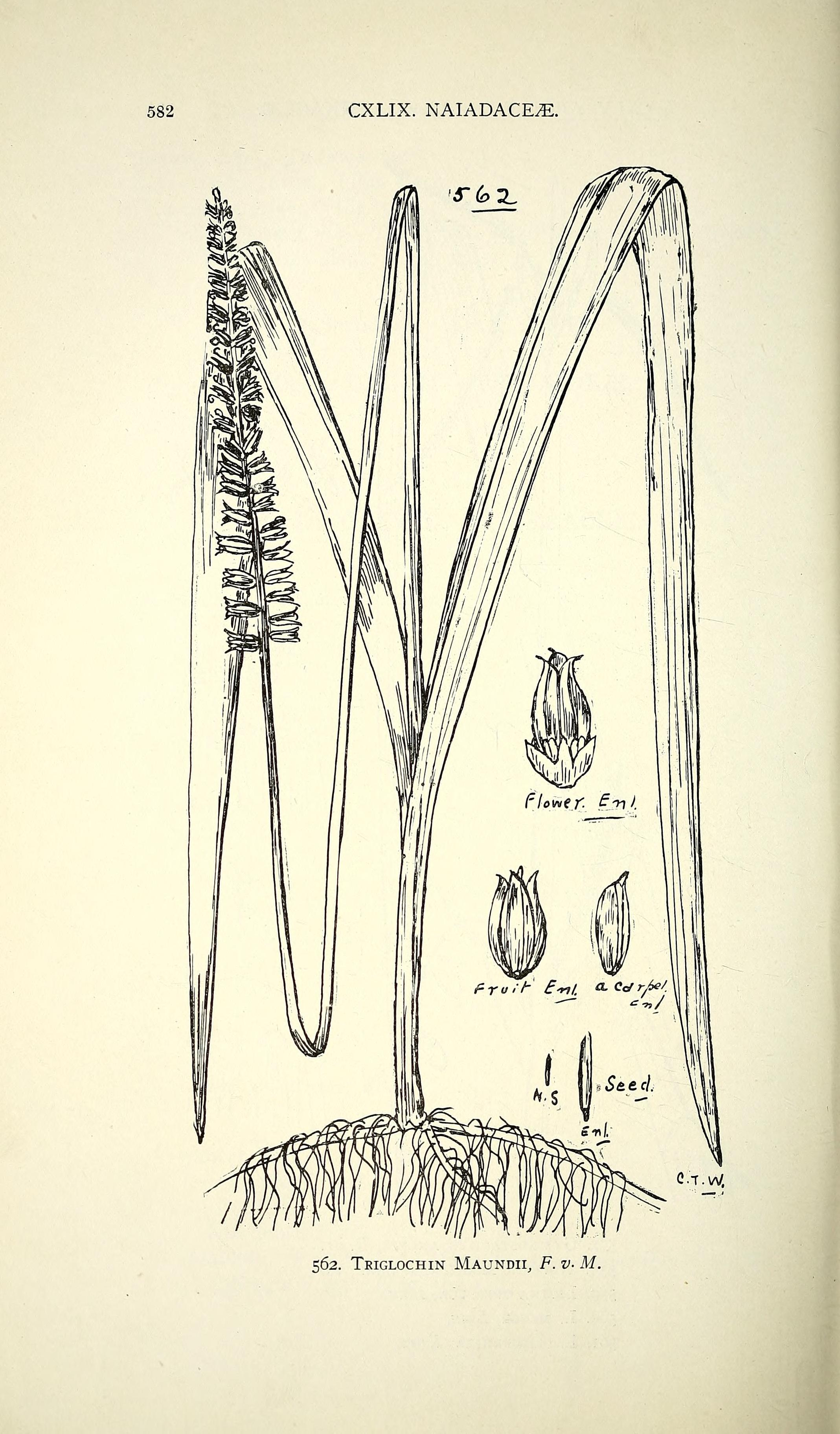

Scientific classification
- Kingdom: Plantae
- Clade: Tracheophytes
- Clade: Angiosperms
- Clade: Monocots
- Order: Alismatales
- Family: Maundiaceae; Nakai
- Genus: Maundia; F.Muell.
- Species: M. triglochinoides

Binomial name
- Maundia triglochinoides F.Muell.

Synonyms
- Triglochin triglochinoides (F.Muell.) Druce; Triglochin maundii F.Muell.

= Maundia =

Genus of flowering plants

Maundia is a genus of alismatid monocots, described in 1858. Maundia was formerly included in the family Juncaginaceae but is now considered to form a family of its own under the name Maundiaceae. It contains only one known species, Maundia triglochinoides, endemic to Australia (States of Queensland and New South Wales).

The species is listed as vulnerable.

== Bibliography ==
- Wilkin, Paul; Mayo, Simon J, eds. (2013). Early events in monocot evolution. Cambridge: Cambridge University Press. ISBN 978-1-107-01276-9.
- Les, Donald H; Tippery, Nicholas P. In time and with water ... the systematics of alismatid monocotyledons (PDF). pp. 118–164., in Wilkin & Mayo (2013)
- Angiosperm Phylogeny Group (2016). "An update of the Angiosperm Phylogeny Group classification for the orders and families of flowering plants: APG IV". Botanical Journal of the Linnean Society. 181 (1): 1–20. doi:10.1111/boj.12385.
