= Helen Isobel Aston =

Australian botanist (1934–2020)

- Born: 26 March 1934; Narrandera, New South Wales, Australia
- Died: 17 March 2020 (aged 85)
- Education: University of Melbourne
- Known for: Aquatic Plants of Australia
- Scientific career
- Fields: Botany
- Workplaces: National Herbarium of Victoria
- Author abbrev. (botany): Aston

Helen Isobel Aston (26 March 1934 – 17 March 2020) was an Australian botanist and ornithologist.

== Biography ==
Aston completed her Bachelor of Science in 1957 with majors in botany and zoology from the University of Melbourne.

Aston worked at the National Herbarium of Victoria from 1956 to 1991, where she became one of Australia's leading authorities on freshwater vascular plants. The National Herbarium of Victoria holds the majority of Aston's herbarium, almost 3,000 specimens, with duplicates distributed around Australian Herbaria including AD, BRI, CANB, HO, NE, NSW and PERTH.

Aston is probably best known for her book Aquatic Plants of Australia published in 1973 by Melbourne University Press.

Aston has represented Australian herbaria as the Australian Botanical Liaison Officer in 1974 with the Royal Botanic Gardens, Kew, United Kingdom.

Aston edited the in-house journal, Muelleria, from 1977 to 1988.

== Standard author abbreviation ==
The standard author abbreviation Aston is used to indicate this person as the author when citing a botanical name.

== Selected published names ==
- Limnophyton australiense Aston
- Triglochin alcockiae Aston
- Nymphoides triangularis Aston
- See also Category:Taxa named by Helen Isobel Aston

and

- Australian Plant Name Index

== Awards and honours ==
In 1979, Aston was awarded the Australian Natural History Medallion by the Field Naturalists Club of Victoria.

== Selected publications ==
=== Books ===
- Aquatic Plants of Australia (1973)
- A bird atlas of the Melbourne Region (1978)

=== Journal articles ===
- H.I. Aston (1967). "Aquatic Angiosperms: Records of four introduced species new to Victoria)" (PDF). Muelleria. 1 (3): 169–174. doi:10.5962/p.237617. ISSN 0077-1813. Wikidata Q104234714.
- H.I. Aston (1976). "Hypecoum pendulum L. (Papaveraceae) in Australia - a new introduction" (PDF). Muelleria. 3 (3): 177–182. doi:10.5962/p.171921. ISSN 0077-1813. Wikidata Q104225439.
- H.I. Aston (1977). "The species of Paronychia (Caryophyllaceae) naturalised in Victoria". Muelleria. 3 (4): 209–214. doi:10.5962/p.171928. ISSN 0077-1813. Wikidata Q104225369.
- H.I. Aston (1987). "Nymphoides beaglensis (Menyanthaceae): a new Australian species" (PDF). Muelleria. 6 (5): 359–362. doi:10.5962/p.171882. ISSN 0077-1813. Wikidata Q104153608.
- H.I. Aston (1987), "Influx of the Grey-headed Flying-fox Pteropus poliocephalus (Chiroptera: Pteropodidae) to the Melbourne area, Victoria, in 1986", The Victorian Naturalist, 104: 9–13
- H.I. Aston (1993). "New Australian species of Triglochin L. (Juncaginaceae) formerly included in T. procerum R.Br" (PDF). Muelleria. 8 (1): 85–97. doi:10.5962/p.198501. ISSN 0077-1813. Wikidata Q104398490.
- H. Aston (1995). "A revision of the tuberous rooted Triglochin L. (Juncaginaceae) in Australia" (PDF). Muelleria. 8 (3): 331–364. doi:10.5962/p.198464. ISSN 0077-1813. Wikidata Q104043228.
- H.I. Aston (1997). "Nymphoides spinulosperma (Menyanthaceae): a new species from south-eastern Australia" (PDF). Muelleria. 10: 21–25. doi:10.5962/p.198417. ISSN 0077-1813. Wikidata Q104007372.
- H.I Aston (1999). "Triglochin protuberans, (Juncaginaceae): a new species from Western Australia" (PDF). Muelleria. 12 (2): 215–216. doi:10.5962/p.198398. ISSN 0077-1813. Wikidata Q104007347.
- H.I. Aston (2008). "Notes on some Australian Triglochin (Juncaginaceae) annuals: typification and nomenclature" (PDF). Muelleria. 26 (2): 98–100. doi:10.5962/p.337564. ISSN 0077-1813. Wikidata Q102438629.

== Legacy ==
The following plants have been named in her honour:

=== Genera ===
- Astonia S.W.L.Jacobs

=== Species ===
- Nymphoides astoniae M.D.Barrett & R.L.Barrett
