= Ludwig Jost =

German botanist

Ludwig Jost ForMemRS (born 1865 – 1947) was a German botanist, and university professor.

== Life and work ==
Jost was born on November 13, 1865, in Karlsruhe, which was then part of the Grand Duchy of Baden.

After attending the gymnasium in Karlsruhe, Jost studied natural sciences at the University of Heidelberg, then from 1885, was a student at Kaiser Wilhelm University in Strasbourg. In 1887 he obtained his PhD as a student of Anton de Bary, and later on, worked as an assistant to Karl von Goebel at the University of Marburg. Afterwards, he returned to Strasbourg, where in 1891, he received his habilitation under the sponsorship of Hermann zu Solms-Laubach. In 1894 he became an associate professor, and from 1919 to 1934, he held the chair of botany at the University of Heidelberg.

He earlier research largely dealt with morphological and histological issues — later on, his main field of study involved the physiology of plants; working with subjects such as: growth rhythm, nyctinasty, geotropism, leaf positioning, electrical potential differences on cell walls, et al.

He died February 22, 1947, in Heidelberg.

== Works ==
- Vorlesungen über Pflanzenphysiologie (Lectures on plant physiology). Fischer, Jena, 1904.
- He edited sections on physiology in seven editions (ed.10, 1910 – ed.16, 1923) of Eduard Strasburger's Lehrbuch der Botanik für Hochschulen.
- Der Kampf ums Dasein im Pflanzenreich (The struggle for existence in the plant kingdom). Heitz, Strasbourg 1916 (Strasbourg, Rector's speech of 1 May 1916).
- Führer durch den Botanischen Garten in Heidelberg (Guide to the botanical garden in Heidelberg). Heidelberg 1922 [description of the contemporary state of the garden on the campus]
- with Gerta von Ubisch: Zur Windefrage (The wind question). W. de Gruyter & Co., Berlin, 1926.
- Die Entstehung der großen Entdeckungen in der Botanik (The emergence of the great discoveries in botany). Speech at the inauguration ceremony on the 18th kingdom January, 1930. Carl Winter, Heidelberg, 1930 (University of Heidelberg speeches; 9).
- Zum hundertsten Geburtstag Anton de Barys. Lebenswerk eines Botanikers des 19. Jahrhunderts (Anton de Bary's centenary year. Life's work of a botanist of the 19th Century). G. Fischer, Jena, 1930.
- Baum und Wald (Tree and forest); J. Springer, Berlin 1936, 2nd, revised edition by Fritz Overbeck. Springer, Berlin / New York / Paris 1952.
