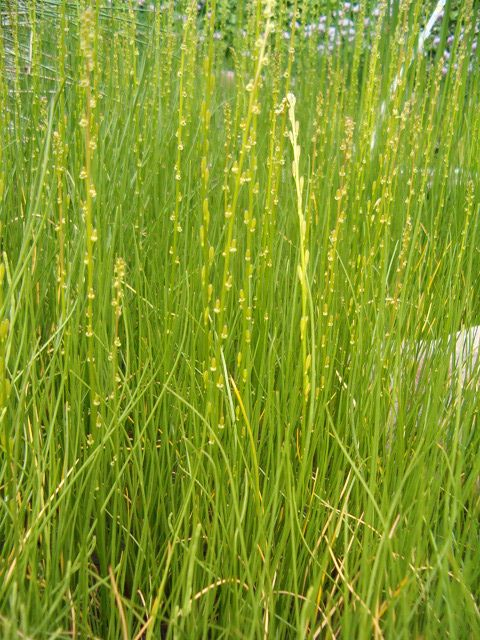
- Triglochin palustris

Scientific classification
- Kingdom: Plantae
- Clade: Embryophytes
- Clade: Tracheophytes
- Clade: Angiosperms
- Clade: Monocots
- Order: Alismatales
- Family: Juncaginaceae; Rich.

Genera
- Cycnogeton Endl.; Tetroncium Willd.; Triglochin Riv. ex L.

= Juncaginaceae =

Family of aquatic plants

Juncaginaceae is a family of flowering plants, recognized by most taxonomists for the past few decades. It is also known as the arrowgrass family. It includes 3 genera with a total of 34 known species (Christenhusz & Byng 2016).

The APG II system, of 2003 (unchanged from the APG system, of 1998), also recognizes such a family and places it in the order Alismatales, in the clade monocots. The species are found in cold or temperate regions in both the Northern and Southern Hemisphere. However APG IV (2016) removed the genus Maundia due to its non-exclusive relationship, and elevated it to the monogeneric family Maundiaceae.

== Description ==
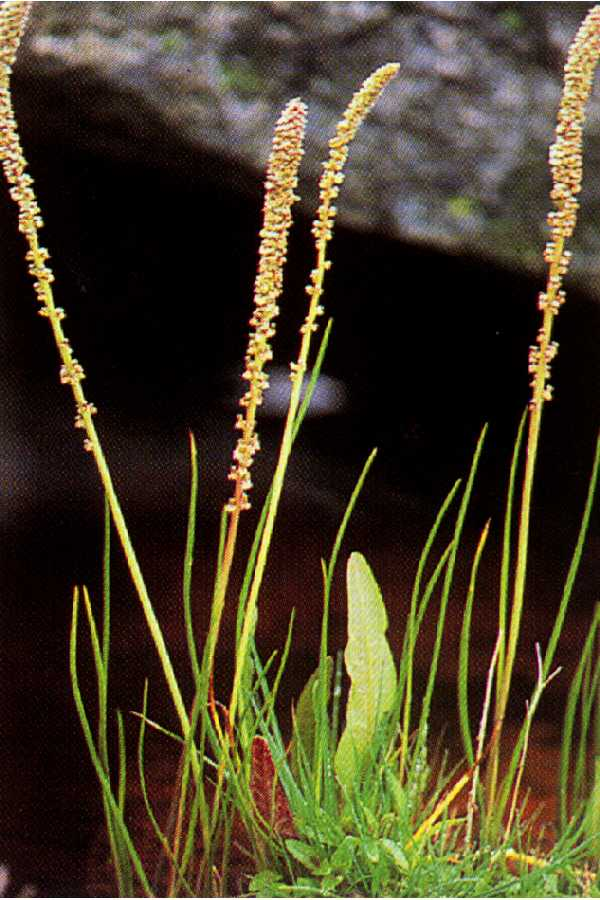
Sea Arrowgrass Triglochin maritima

Juncaginaceae are marsh or aquatic herbs with linear, sheathing basal leaves. The flowers are small and green in erect spikes or racemes. The flower parts come in threes, but the carpels are either 3 or 6, joined to a superior ovary. The fruit is a capsule. Example arrowgrasses Triglochin include the Marsh Arrowgrass (Triglochin palustris), the Sea Arrowgrass (Triglochin maritima), and also other species like Triglochin trichophora, Triglochin striata and Triglochin mucronata.

- Juncaginaceae
  - - Triglochin (including Lilaea)
    - Tetroncium
  - Cycnogeton

== Distribution ==
Species richness map of the Juncaginaceae family across WGSRPD botanical countries, with the highest in Western Australia (17 species).

Juncaginaceae diversity is centered in Australia, with other diverse areas in the Cape Floristic Region and Argentina.

== Taxonomy ==
The genus Maundia was placed within the family Juncaginaceae by the APG II. The newer APG III version (2009), though, suggested it may be necessary to split Maundia off into its own monogeneric family, Maundiaceae, supported by the non-exclusive relationship of the genus to Juncaginaceae. This was achieved in the APG IV (2016), leaving only four genera in Juncaginaceae.

== Bibliography ==
- Angiosperm Phylogeny Group (2016). "An update of the Angiosperm Phylogeny Group classification for the orders and families of flowering plants: APG IV". Botanical Journal of the Linnean Society. 181 (1): 1–20. doi:10.1111/boj.12385.
- Christenhusz, Maarten J.M.; Vorontsova, Maria S.; Fay, Michael F. & Chase, Mark W. (August 2015), "Results from an online survey of family delimitation in angiosperms and ferns: recommendations to the Angiosperm Phylogeny Group for thorny problems in plant classification", Botanical Journal of the Linnean Society, 178 (4): 501–528, doi:10.1111/boj.12285
- Les, Donald H; Tippery, Nicholas P, In time and with water ... the systematics of alismatid monocotyledons (PDF), pp. 118–164, archived from the original (PDF) on 2022-10-09, in Wilkin & Mayo (2013)
- Wilkin, Paul; Mayo, Simon J, eds. (2013). Early events in monocot evolution. Cambridge: Cambridge University Press. ISBN 978-1-107-01276-9.
- Von Mering, S; Kadereit, JW. Phylogeny, Systematics, and Recircumscription of Juncaginaceae – A Cosmopolitan Wetland Family (PDF). pp. 55–79., in Seberg et al (2010)
- Seberg, Ole; Petersen, Gitte; Barfod, Anders; Davis, Jerrold I., eds. (2010). Diversity, phylogeny, and evolution in the Monocotyledons: proceedings of the Fourth International Conference on the Comparative Biology of the Monocotyledons and the Fifth International Symposium on Grass Systematics and Evolution. Århus: Aarhus University Press. ISBN 978-87-7934-398-6.
