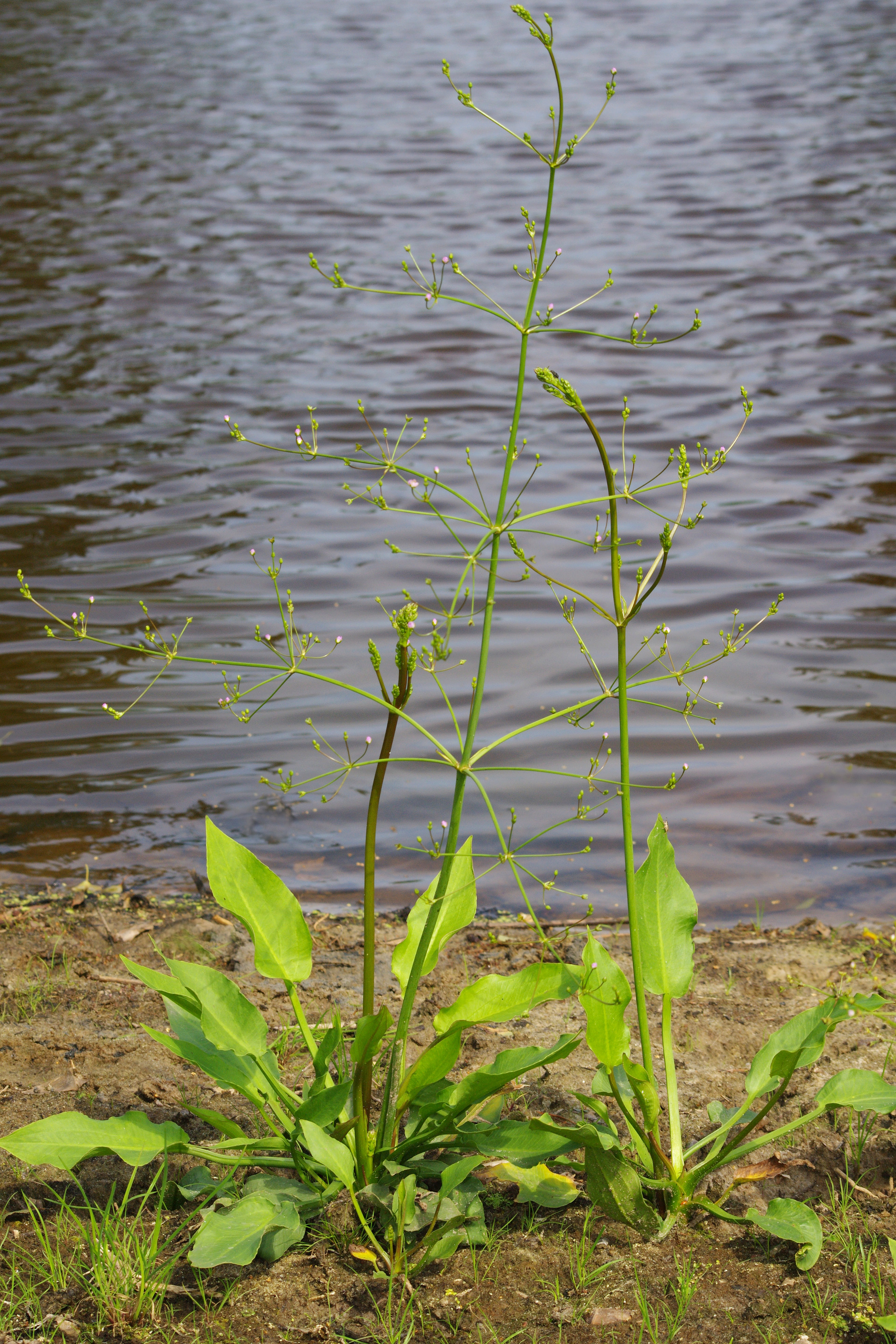
- Alisma plantago-aquatica

Scientific classification
- Kingdom: Plantae
- Clade: Embryophytes
- Clade: Tracheophytes
- Clade: Angiosperms
- Clade: Monocots
- Order: Alismatales; R.Br. ex Bercht. & J.Presl

Families
- See Taxonomy

= Alismatales =

Order of herbaceous flowering plants of marshy and aquatic habitats

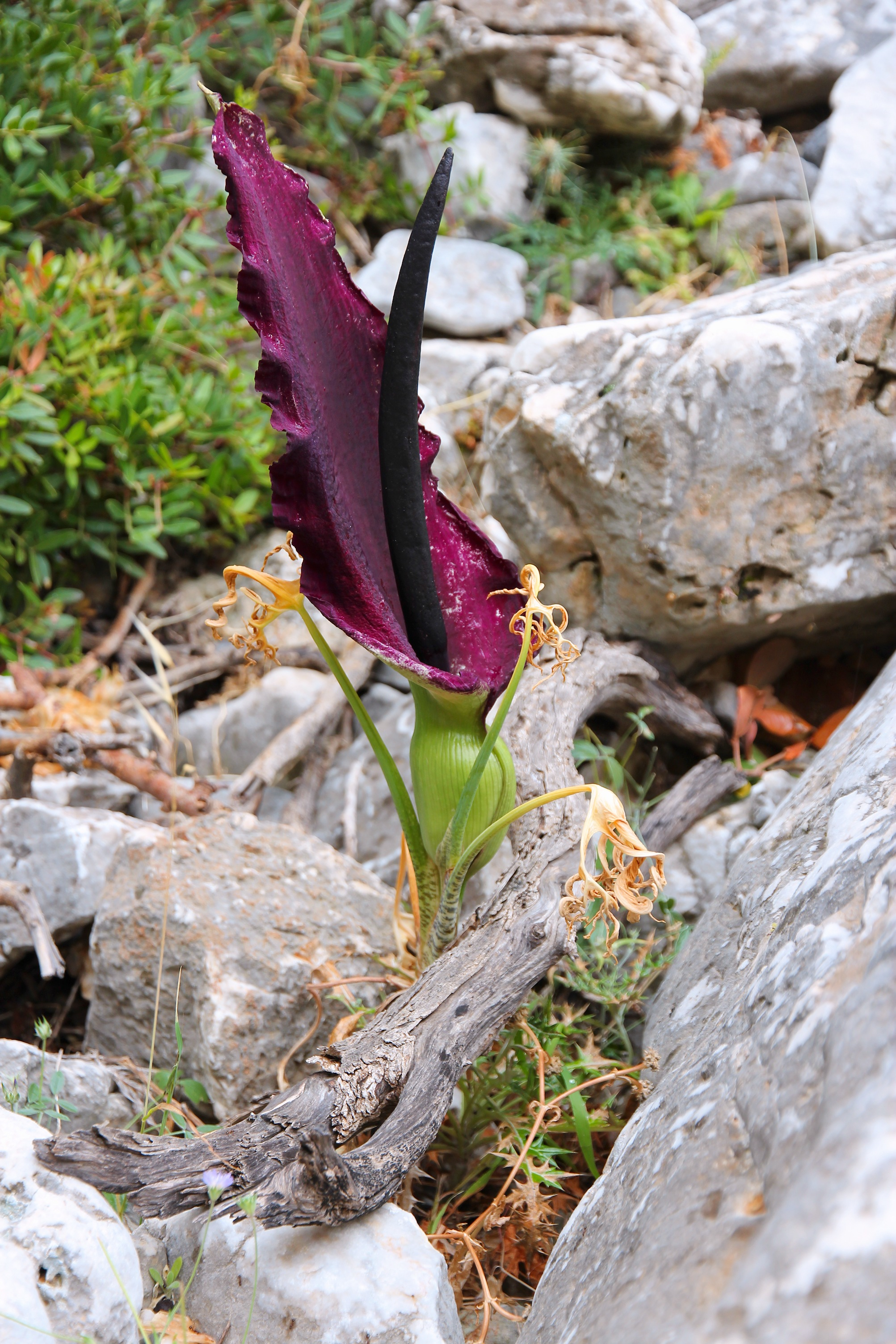
Snake lily (Dracunculus vulgaris) of family Araceae in Crete, Greece.

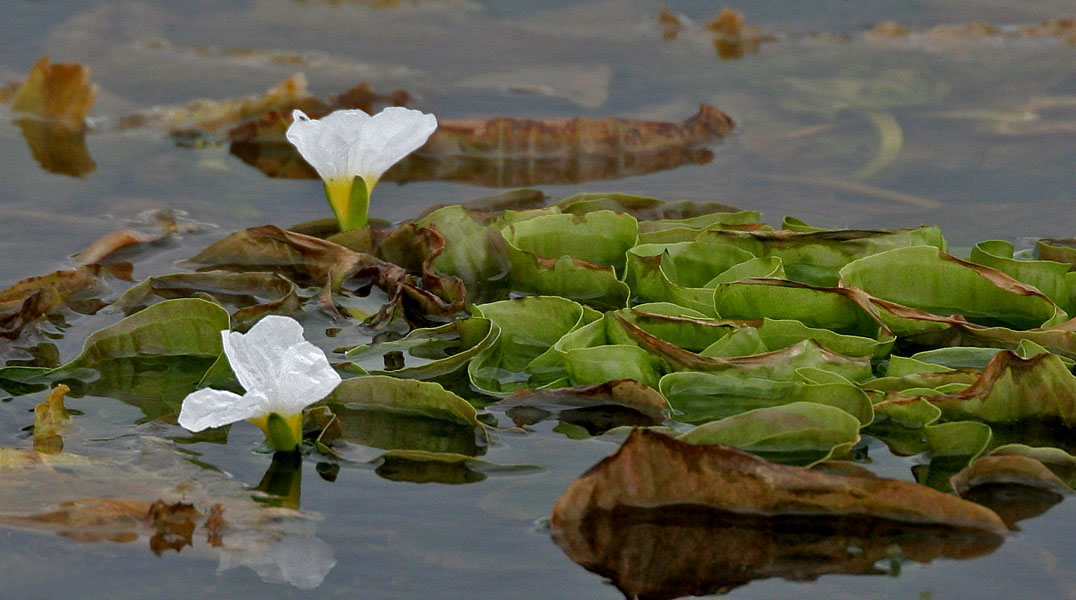
Ottelia alismoides from family Hydrocharitaceae in Hyderabad, India.

The Alismatales (alismatids) are an order of flowering plants including about 4,500 species. Plants assigned to this order are mostly tropical or aquatic. Some grow in fresh water, some in marine habitats. The order includes the taro plant, Colocasia esculenta, an important food crop.

== Description ==
The Alismatales comprise herbaceous flowering plants of often aquatic and marshy habitats, and the only monocots known to have green embryos other than the Amaryllidaceae. They also include the only marine angiosperms growing completely submerged, the seagrasses. The flowers are usually arranged in inflorescences, and the mature seeds lack endosperm.

Both marine and freshwater forms include those with staminate flowers that detach from the parent plant and float to the surface. There they can pollinate carpellate flowers floating on the surface via long pedicels. In others, pollination occurs underwater, where pollen may form elongated strands, increasing chance of success. Most aquatic species have a totally submerged juvenile phase, and flowers are either floating or emerge above the water's surface. Vegetation may be totally submersed, have floating leaves, or protrude from the water. Collectively, they are commonly known as "water plantain".

== Taxonomy ==
The Alismatales contain about 165 genera in 13 families, with a cosmopolitan distribution. Phylogenetically, they are basal monocots, diverging early in evolution relative to the lilioid and commelinid monocot lineages. Together with the Acorales, the Alismatales are referred to informally as the alismatid monocots.

=== Early systems ===
The Cronquist system (1981) places the Alismatales in subclass Alismatidae, class Liliopsida [= monocotyledons] and includes only three families as shown:

- Alismataceae
- Butomaceae
- Limnocharitaceae

Cronquist's subclass Alismatidae conformed fairly closely to the order Alismatales as defined by APG, minus the Araceae.

The Dahlgren system places the Alismatales in the superorder Alismatanae in the subclass Liliidae [= monocotyledons] in the class Magnoliopsida [= angiosperms] with the following families included:

- Alismataceae
- Aponogetonaceae
- Butomaceae
- Hydrocharitaceae
- Limnocharitaceae

In Tahktajan's classification (1997), the order Alismatales contains only the Alismataceae and Limnocharitaceae, making it equivalent to the Alismataceae as revised in APG-III. Other families included in the Alismatates as currently defined are here distributed among 10 additional orders, all of which are assigned, with the following exception, to the Subclass Alismatidae. Araceae in Tahktajan 1997 is assigned to the Arales and placed in the Subclass Aridae; Tofieldiaceae to the Melanthiales and placed in the Liliidae.

=== Angiosperm Phylogeny Group ===
The Angiosperm Phylogeny Group system (APG) of 1998 and APG II (2003) assigned the Alismatales to the monocots, which may be thought of as an unranked clade containing the families listed below. The biggest departure from earlier systems (see below) is the inclusion of family Araceae. By its inclusion, the order has grown enormously in number of species. The family Araceae alone accounts for about a hundred genera, totaling over two thousand species. The rest of the families together contain only about five hundred species, many of which are in very small families.

The APG III system (2009) differs only in that the Limnocharitaceae are combined with the Alismataceae; it was also suggested that the genus Maundia (of the Juncaginaceae) could be separated into a monogeneric family, the Maundiaceae, but the authors noted that more study was necessary before the Maundiaceae could be recognized.

- order Alismatales sensu APG III
  family Alismataceae (including Limnocharitaceae)
  family Aponogetonaceae
  family Araceae
  family Butomaceae
  family Cymodoceaceae
  family Hydrocharitaceae
  family Juncaginaceae
  family Posidoniaceae
  family Potamogetonaceae
  family Ruppiaceae
  family Scheuchzeriaceae
  family Tofieldiaceae
  family Zosteraceae

In APG IV (2016), it was decided that evidence was sufficient to elevate Maundia to family level as the monogeneric Maundiaceae. The authors considered including a number of the smaller families within the Juncaginaceae, but an online survey of botanists and other users found little support for this "lumping" approach. Consequently, the family structure for APG IV is:

Cladogram of Alismatales

- Alismatales
  - Araceae
  - - Tofieldiaceae
    - - - Alismataceae
        - - Butomaceae
          - Hydrocharitaceae
      - - Aponogetonaceae
        - - Scheuchzeriaceae
          - - Juncaginaceae
            - - Maundiaceae
              - - - Potamogetonaceae
                  - Zosteraceae
                - - Posidoniaceae
                  - - Cymodoceaceae
                    - Ruppiaceae

- family Alismataceae (including Limnocharitaceae)
  family Aponogetonaceae
  family Araceae
  family Butomaceae
  family Cymodoceaceae
  family Hydrocharitaceae
  family Juncaginaceae
  family Maundiaceae
  family Posidoniaceae
  family Potamogetonaceae
  family Ruppiaceae
  family Scheuchzeriaceae
  family Tofieldiaceae
  family Zosteraceae

=== Phylogeny ===
Cladogram showing the orders of monocots (Lilianae sensu Chase & Reveal) based on molecular phylogenetic evidence:

- Lilianae sensu Chase & Reveal
  - - Acorales
    - - Alismatales
      - - Petrosaviales
        - - - Dioscoreales
            - Pandanales
          - - Liliales
            - - Asparagales
              - commelinids
                - Dasypogonaceae
                - Arecales
                - Poales
                - - Zingiberales
                  - Commelinales
