= Landois =

Landois is a German surname. Notable people with the surname include:

- Hermann Landois (1835–1905), German zoologist
- Leonard Landois (1837–1902), German physiologist
- Paul Landois, French playwright
- Stéphane Landois (born 1994), French equestrian
- Julia Barbosa Landois (born 1959), American artist
