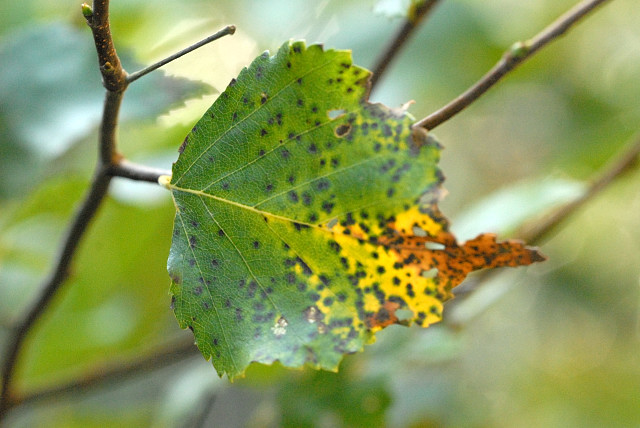
- Marssonina betulae from Commanster, Belgium

Scientific classification
- Kingdom: Fungi
- Division: Ascomycota
- Class: Leotiomycetes
- Order: Helotiales
- Family: Dermateaceae
- Genus: Marssonina; Magnus 1906

Species
- See text.

= Marssonina =

Genus of fungi

Marssonina is a genus of fungi in the family Dermateaceae.

The genus name of Marssonina is in honour of Theodor Friedrich Marsson (1816–1892), who was a German pharmacist and botanist.

The genus was circumscribed by Paul Wilhelm Magnus in Hedwigia vol.45 on page 89 in 1906.

== Species ==
- Marssonina acaciae
- Marssonina acerina
- Marssonina actaeae
- Marssonina actinostemmae
- Marssonina aegopodii
- Marssonina agaves
- Marssonina alni
- Marssonina andurnensis
- Marssonina apicalis
- Marssonina aquilegiae
- Marssonina artocarpi
- Marssonina atragenes
- Marssonina aurantiaca
- Marssonina balsamiferae
- Marssonina betulae
- Marssonina bracteosa
- Marssonina bupleuri
- Marssonina californica
- Marssonina campanulae
- Marssonina canadensis
- Marssonina capsulicola
- Marssonina carnea
- Marssonina carpogena
- Marssonina celastri
- Marssonina celtidis
- Marssonina ceratocarpi
- Marssonina chamerionis
- Marssonina chrysothamni
- Marssonina clematidicola
- Marssonina clematidis
- Marssonina daphnes
- Marssonina decolorans
- Marssonina deformans'
- Marssonina dimocarpi
- Marssonina dispersa
- Marssonina ershadii
- Marssonina erythraeae
- Marssonina erythreae
- Marssonina euphorbiae
- Marssonina euphoriae
- Marssonina extremorum
- Marssonina flourensiae
- Marssonina forsythiae
- Marssonina fraserae
- Marssonina gei
- Marssonina gladioli
- Marssonina gloeodes
- Marssonina graminicola
- Marssonina grossulariae
- Marssonina halostachyos
- Marssonina indica
- Marssonina ipomoeae
- Marssonina junonis
- Marssonina kirchneri
- Marssonina kriegeriana
- Marssonina lappae
- Marssonina lindii
- Marssonina lonicerae
- Marssonina lorentzii
- Marssonina manschurica
- Marssonina martinii
- Marssonina matteiana
- Marssonina medicaginis
- Marssonina melampyri
- Marssonina meliloti
- Marssonina melonis
- Marssonina moravica
- Marssonina myricariae
- Marssonina necans
- Marssonina neilliae
- Marssonina nigricans
- Marssonina obclavata
- Marssonina obscura
- Marssonina obtusata
- Marssonina ochroleuca
- Marssonina omphalodis
- Marssonina pakistanica
- Marssonina piriformis
- Marssonina polygoni
- Marssonina poonensis
- Marssonina populicola
- Marssonina pruinosae
- Marssonina psidii
- Marssonina pteridis
- Marssonina punctiformis
- Marssonina quercina
- Marssonina quercus
- Marssonina radiosa
- Marssonina rhabdospora
- Marssonina rhamni
- Marssonina rhois
- Marssonina ribicola
- Marssonina rubiginosa
- Marssonina salicigena
- Marssonina salicina
- Marssonina salicis
- Marssonina salicis-purpureae
- Marssonina sandu-villei
- Marssonina santonensis
- Marssonina saxifragae
- Marssonina sennenii
- Marssonina smilacina
- Marssonina sojicola
- Marssonina sonchi
- Marssonina sorbi
- Marssonina staritzii
- Marssonina stellariae
- Marssonina stenospora
- Marssonina tetracerae
- Marssonina thomasiana
- Marssonina toxicodendri
- Marssonina tranzschelii
- Marssonina truncatula
- Marssonina veratri
- Marssonina violae
- Marssonina viticola
- Marssonina zanthoxyli
