= Najas tenuissima =

Conservation status
- Data Deficient (IUCN 3.1)

Scientific classification
- Kingdom: Plantae
- Clade: Tracheophytes
- Clade: Angiosperms
- Clade: Monocots
- Order: Alismatales
- Family: Hydrocharitaceae
- Genus: Najas
- Species: N. tenuissima

Binomial name
- Najas tenuissima (A.Braun ex Magnus) Magnus

Synonyms
- Homotypic Synonyms: Caulinia tenuissima (A.Braun ex Magnus) Tzvelev; Najas minor var. tenuissima A.Braun ex Magnus; Najas minor subsp. tenuissima (A.Braun ex Magnus) K.Richt.; Heterotypic Synonyms: Najas yezoensis Miyabe

Species of flowering plant

Najas tenuissima is a species of flowering plant belonging to the family Hydrocharitaceae. It is native to Amur Oblast, Finland, Japan, Mongolia, Russia (Central and Northwest European), and Primorsky Krai and is found as an introduced species in Kazakhstan.
