= Theodor Marsson =

German pharmacist and botanist (1816–1892)

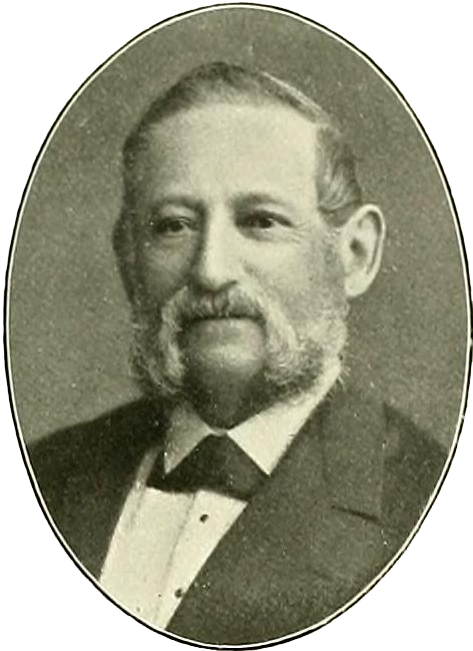
Theodor Marsson

Theodor Friedrich Marsson (8 November 1816 – 5 February 1892) was a German pharmacist and botanist. Marsson was born in Wolgast, Prussian Pomerania, just a year after the Swedish Empire had de-occupied the city, which had been under Swedish control since the Thirty Years' War. He was father-in-law to physiologist Leonard Landois (1837–1902).

The son of a pharmacist, he studied chemistry under Justus von Liebig (1803–1873) at the University of Giessen. After completing his studies he took charge of the pharmacy in his hometown of Wolgast. In 1840 he provided necessary information towards the publication of Wilhelm Ludwig Ewald Schmidt's Flora von Pommern und Rügen (Flora of Pomerania and Rügen). In 1856 he was awarded an honorary PhD from the University of Greifswald. In 1869 he published a botanical study on Neuvorpommern and the islands of Usedom and Rügen titled Flora von Neuvorpommern und den Inseln Usedom und Rügen.

Around 1870 he sold the pharmacy in Wolgast and retired to private life in Greifswald, later relocating to Berlin. In retirement he turned to microscopical research, making contributions in the field of palaeontology. On the basis of fossils found in chalk deposits at Rügen he composed works on foraminifera (1878), ostracods and cirripedes (1880). In 1887 he published a highly regarded work titled Die Bryozoen der weissen Schreibkreide der Insel Rügen (Bryozoa of the white chalk of Rügen). Marsson's last scientific activity dealt with living organisms, involving microscopic research of diatoms.

The mycological genus Marssonina was named after him by Paul Wilhelm Magnus, in 1906. Then in 1965, botanist Petrak published Cyclomarsonina (a fungus, in family Ascomycota).
