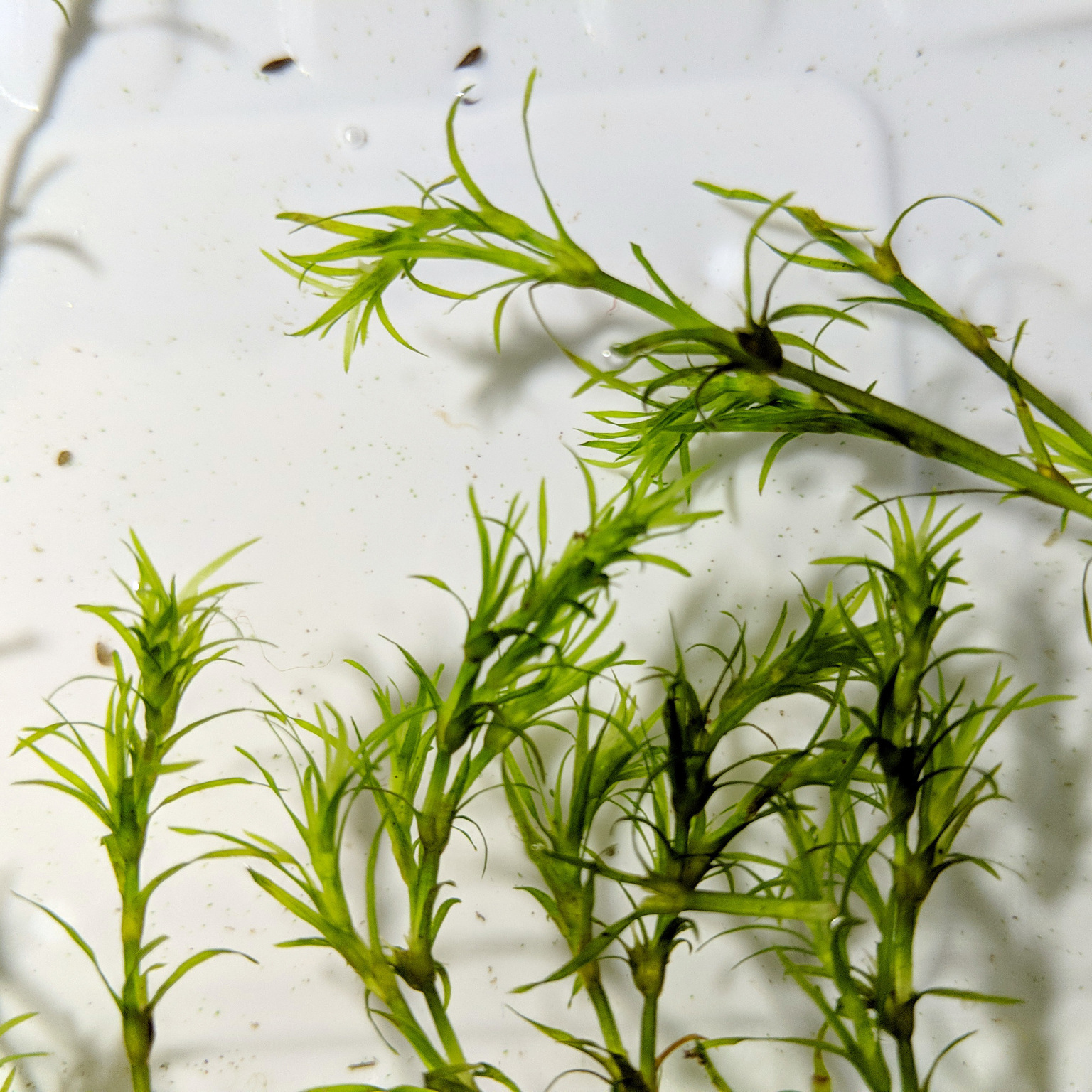
- From Fidalgo Island, Washington state

Conservation status
- Least Concern (IUCN 3.1)

- Secure (NatureServe)

Scientific classification
- Kingdom: Plantae
- Clade: Embryophytes
- Clade: Tracheophytes
- Clade: Angiosperms
- Clade: Monocots
- Order: Alismatales
- Family: Hydrocharitaceae
- Genus: Najas
- Species: N. guadalupensis

Binomial name
- Najas guadalupensis (Spreng.) Magnus

Subspecies
- Najas guadalupensis subsp. floridana (R.R.Haynes & Wentz) R.R.Haynes & Hellq.; Najas guadalupensis subsp. guadalupensis; Najas guadalupensis subsp. olivacea (Rosend. & Butters) R.R.Haynes & Hellq.

Synonyms
- List: Caulinia guadalupensis Spreng. (1824); Najas flexilis var. guadalupensis (Spreng.) A.Braun (1864); Najas microdon A.Braun (1868); Najas microdon var. guadalupensis (Spreng.) A.Braun (1868)

= Najas guadalupensis =

New World species of aquatic plant

Najas guadalupensis is a species of aquatic plant known by the common names southern waternymph, guppy grass, southern naiad, najas grass and common water nymph. It is native to the Americas, where it is widespread. It is considered native to Canada (from Alberta to Quebec), and most of the contiguous United States, Mexico, Central America, the West Indies and South America. It has been introduced in Japan, and Palestine and Israel.

Najas guadalupensis is an annual, growing submerged in aquatic habitat types such as ponds, ditches, and streams. It produces a slender, branching stem up to 60 to 90 centimeters in maximum length. The thin, somewhat transparent, flexible leaves are up to 3 centimeters long and just 1 or 2 millimeters wide. They are edged with minute, unicellular teeth. Tiny flowers occur in the leaf axils; staminate flowers grow toward the end of the plant and pistillate closer to the base. They are also a popular aquarium plant for beginners due to their hardiness as well as growth rate, which helps provide shelter for aquarium fish.

== Subspecies ==
Numerous varietal and subspecific names have been proposed. Only four are currently recognized:

- Najas guadalupensis subsp. floridana (R.R.Haynes & Wentz) R.R.Haynes & Hellq – Alabama, Florida, and Georgia (U.S. state); naturalized in Japan
- Najas guadalupensis subsp. guadalupensis
- Najas guadalupensis subsp. muenscheri (R.T.Clausen) R.R.Haynes & Hellq. – New York State
- Najas guadalupensis subsp. olivacea (Rosend. & Butters) R.R.Haynes & Hellq. – Canada (Manitoba, Ontario, Quebec) and northern United States (Iowa, Minnesota, Indiana, Michigan, New York state)
