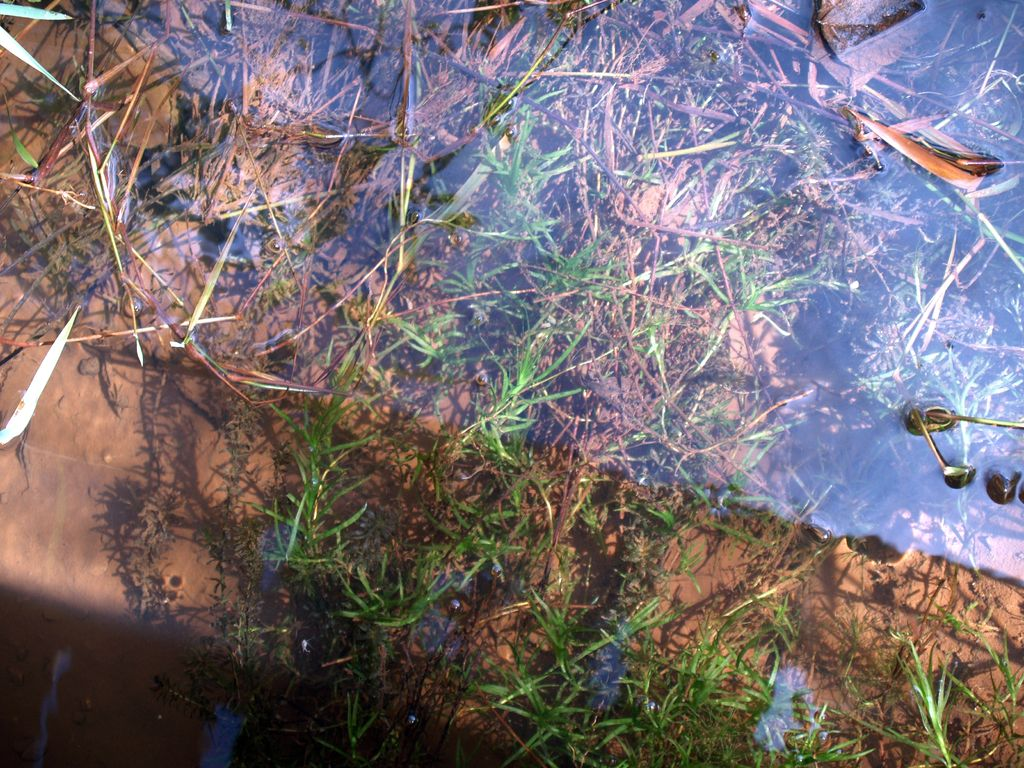

Scientific classification
- Kingdom: Plantae
- Clade: Tracheophytes
- Clade: Angiosperms
- Clade: Monocots
- Order: Alismatales
- Family: Hydrocharitaceae
- Genus: Najas
- Species: N. tenuis

Binomial name
- Najas tenuis Magnus

= Najas tenuis =

Species of aquatic plant

Najas tenuis is a species of aquatic plant in the family Hydrocharitaceae. It is found in freshwater habitats, especially still or slow-moving waters, like ponds and rice fields.

== Distribution and habitat ==
The natural distribution of this annual plant is India and Myanmar.
