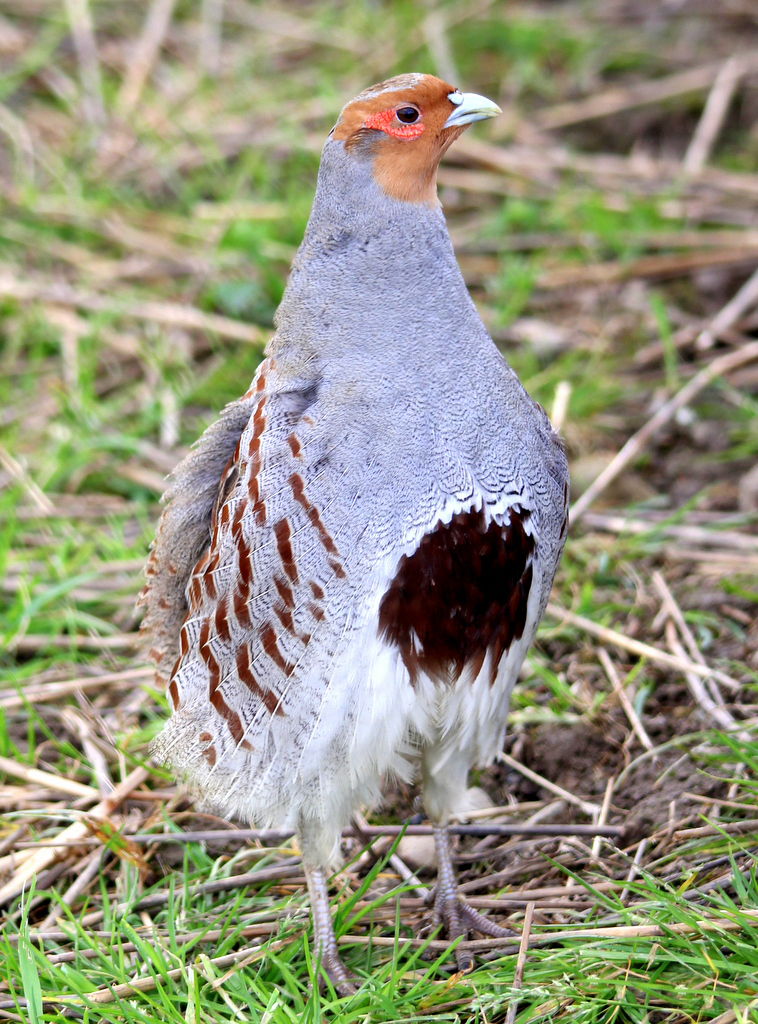
- Male at Turvey, near Dublin, Ireland

Conservation status
- Least Concern (IUCN 3.1)

Scientific classification
- Kingdom: Animalia
- Phylum: Chordata
- Class: Aves
- Order: Galliformes
- Family: Phasianidae
- Genus: Perdix
- Species: P. perdix

Binomial name
- Perdix perdix (Linnaeus, 1758)

Subspecies
- 8, see text
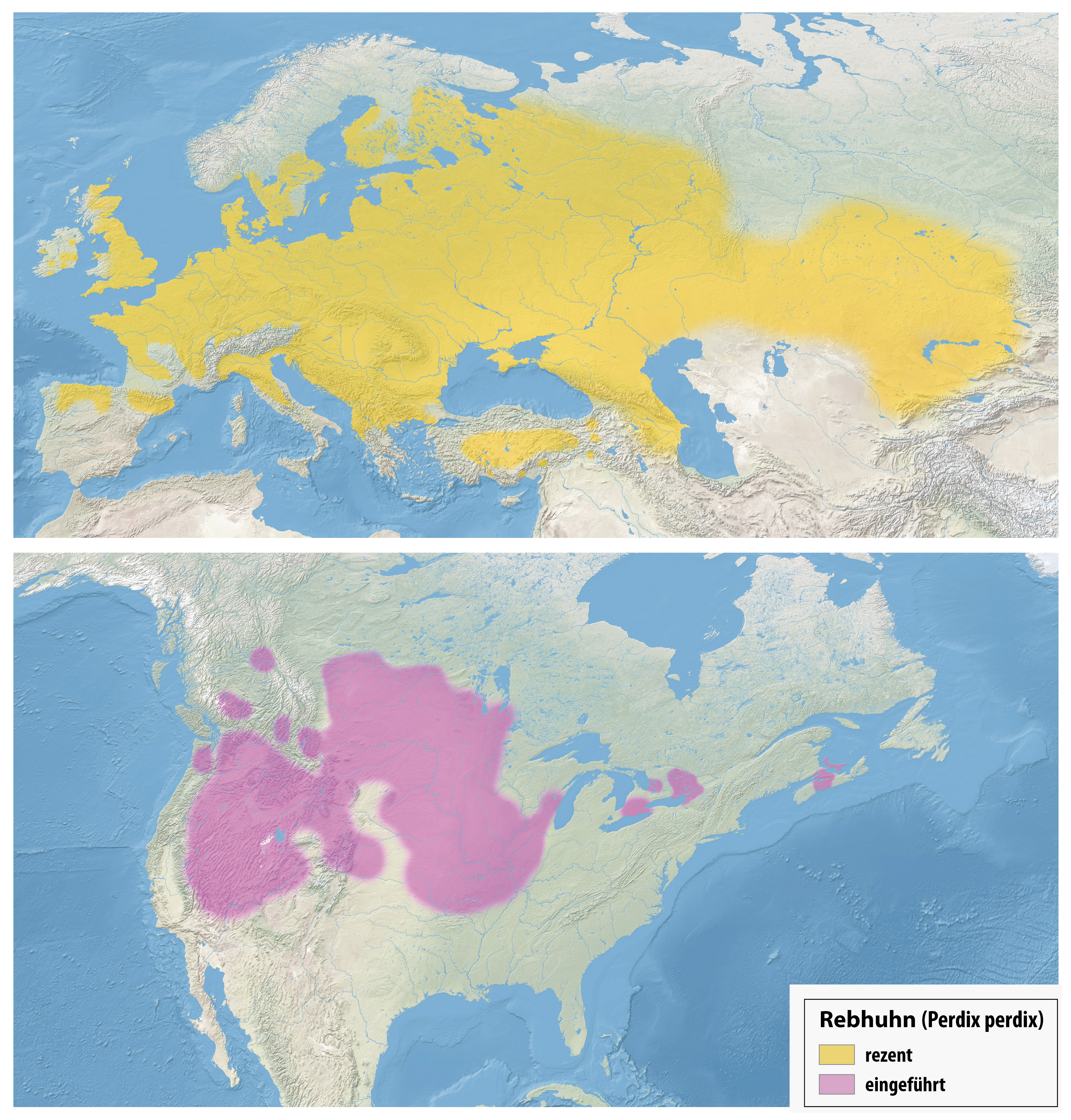
- Range of P. perdix Native range Introduced range

Synonyms
- Tetrao perdix Linnaeus, 1758

= Grey partridge =

Species of bird

The grey partridge (Perdix perdix) is a bird in the pheasant family Phasianidae of the order Galliformes, gallinaceous birds. The scientific name is the Latin for "partridge".

== Taxonomy ==
The grey partridge was formally described in 1758 by the Swedish naturalist Carl Linnaeus in the tenth edition of his Systema Naturae under the binomial name Tetrao perdix. Linnaeus specified the type locality as Europe but this has been restricted to Sweden. The word perdix is Latin meaning "partridge", from Ancient Greek περδιξ/perdix meaning "partridge". The grey partridge together with the Daurian partridge and the Tibetan partridge are now placed in the genus Perdix that was introduced in 1760 by the French zoologist Mathurin Jacques Brisson.

=== Subspecies ===
Eight subspecies are recognised by the IOC World Bird List, though the differences are clinal, and not all are accepted by other authorities; the HBW/BirdLife International list only accepts six subspecies; the differences noted below:

- P. p. perdix (Linnaeus, 1758). Nominate, found in the British Isles and southern Scandinavia to Italy and the Balkans.
- P. p. armoricana (Hartert, 1917). Southwestern France.
- P. p. sphagnetorum (Altum, 1894). On peaty soils in the northern part of the Netherlands and northwest Germany. Barely distinct from P. p. perdix and included in it by HBW/BLI.
- P. p. hispaniensis (Reichenow, 1892). Central Pyrenees to northeast Portugal
- P. p. italica (Hartert, 1917). Included in P. p. perdix by HBW/BLI. Formerly extinct in the wild, now reintroduced.
- P. p. lucida (Altum, 1894). Finland east to the Ural Mountains and south to Black Sea and northern Caucasus.
- P. p. canescens (Burturlin, 1906). Turkey east to the South Caucasus and northwest Iran.
- P. p. robusta (Homeyer and Tancré, 1883). The Ural Mountains to southwestern Siberia and northwestern China. The largest subspecies.

== Description ==
The grey partridge is a rotund bird, brown-backed, with grey flanks and chest. The belly is white, usually marked with a large chestnut-brown horse-shoe mark in males, and also in many females. Hens lay up to twenty eggs in a ground nest. The nest is usually in the margin of a cereal field, most commonly winter wheat.

Measurements:

- Length: 29–31 cm (11–12 in)
- Wingspan: 45–48 cm (18–19 in)
- Weight (P. p. perdix): 320–455 g (11.3–16.0 oz)
- Weight (P. p. robusta): 350–600 g (12–21 oz)

Males and females are the same size, and very similar in plumage, though the females tend to be slightly duller, and have a smaller dark belly patch. In the hand, the so-called "cross of Lorraine" on the tertiary coverts of females are marked with two transverse bars, as opposed to the one in males. These are present after around 16 weeks of age when the birds have moulted into adult plumage. Young grey partridges are mostly yellow-brown and lack the distinctive face and underpart markings. The song is a harsh, high-pitched kieerr-ik. When disturbed, like most gamebirds, it flies a short distance on rounded wings, often calling rick rick rick as it rises.

They are a seed-eating species, but the young in particular take insects as an essential protein supply. During the first 10 days of life, the young can only digest insects. The parents lead their chicks to the edges of cereal fields, where they can forage for insects.

== Distribution ==
Widespread and common throughout much of its range, the grey partridge is evaluated as "of Least Concern" on the IUCN Red List of Threatened Species. However, it has suffered a serious decline in the UK, and in 2015 appeared on the "Birds of Conservation Concern" Red List. This partridge breeds on farmland across most of Europe and across the western Palearctic as far as southwestern Siberia; it is a non-migratory terrestrial species, and forms flocks of up to 30 outside of the breeding season.

It has been introduced widely as a gamebird into Canada, United States, South Africa, Australia and New Zealand. A popular gamebird in large areas of North America, it is sometimes known there as "Hungarian partridge" or just "hun".

== Status and conservation ==
Though common and not threatened, it is declining in numbers in some areas of intensive cultivation such as the United Kingdom, due to a loss of breeding habitat and insecticides harming insect numbers, an important food source for the species. Their numbers have fallen in these areas by as much as 85% in the last 25 years. Efforts are being made in the United Kingdom by organizations such as the Game & Wildlife Conservation Trust to halt this decline by creating conservation headlands.

In 1995, it was nominated a Biodiversity action plan (BAP) species. In Ireland, it is now virtually confined to the Lough Boora reserve in County Offaly where a recent conservation project has succeeded in boosting its numbers to around 900, raising hopes that it may be reintroduced to the rest of Ireland.
