= Najas pseudogracillima =

Hong Kong water nymph

Scientific classification
- Kingdom: Plantae
- Clade: Tracheophytes
- Clade: Angiosperms
- Clade: Monocots
- Order: Alismatales
- Family: Hydrocharitaceae
- Genus: Najas
- Species: N. pseudogracillima

Binomial name
- Najas pseudogracillima L.Triest

Species of aquatic plant

Najas pseudogracillima, called the Hong Kong water nymph, is an aquatic plant growing in fresh water ponds. It is a rare and little-known species known from one collection from a pond on the campus of Chung Chi College at the Chinese University of Hong Kong. It is very similar to N. gracillima except that the male inflorescences lack a spathe.
