= Naias =

Naias may refer to:

- Naias — a common alternative spelling of the aquatic plant genus Najas.
- Naias — a fresh-water nymph (Naiad) of Greek mythology.
- NAIAS — an acronym for the North American International Auto Show.
