= Najas ancistrocarpa =

Scientific classification
- Kingdom: Plantae
- Clade: Embryophytes
- Clade: Tracheophytes
- Clade: Spermatophytes
- Clade: Angiosperms
- Clade: Monocots
- Order: Alismatales
- Family: Hydrocharitaceae
- Genus: Najas
- Species: N. ancistrocarpa

Binomial name
- Najas ancistrocarpa A.Braun ex Magnus

Synonyms
- Caulinia ancistrocarpa (A.Braun ex Magnus) Nakai; Najas poyangensis S.F.Guan & Q.Lang

Species of aquatic plant

Najas ancistrocarpa is a species of aquatic plant in the Hydrocharitaceae family. It grows in fresh water ponds and is a native to Japan (Honshu) and to parts of China (Fujian, Hubei, Jiangxi, Taiwan, Zhejiang).
