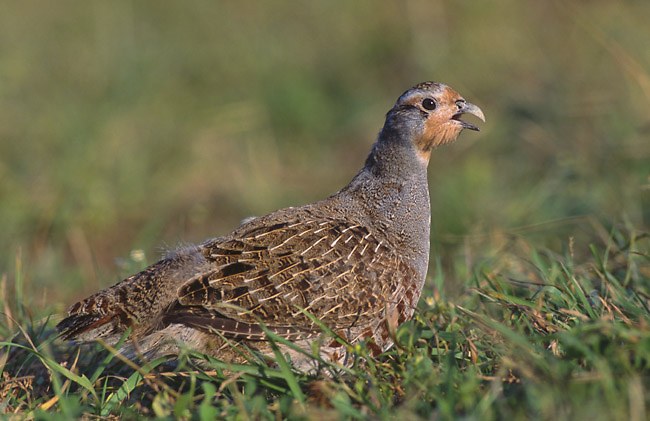
- Grey partridge (Perdix perdix)

Scientific classification
- Kingdom: Animalia
- Phylum: Chordata
- Class: Aves
- Order: Galliformes
- Family: Phasianidae
- Subfamily: Phasianinae
- Genus: Perdix; Brisson, 1760

Type species
- Tetrao perdix Linnaeus, 1758

Species
- P. perdix P. dauurica P. hodgsoniae

= Perdix =

Genus of birds

Perdix is a genus of Galliform gamebirds known collectively as the 'true partridges'. These birds are unrelated to the subtropical species that have been named after the partridge due to similar size and morphology.

== Taxonomy ==
The genus Perdix was introduced by the French zoologist Mathurin Jacques Brisson in 1760 with the grey partridge (Perdix perdix) as the type species. The genus name is Latin for "partridge", which is itself derived from Ancient Greek ‘πέρδιξ’ (pérdīx). They are closely related to grouse, koklass, quail and pheasants.

This genus contains three extant species:

Image	Common name	Scientific name	Distribution
	Grey partridge	Perdix perdix	Europe and central Asia; Introduced to Canada, United States, South Africa, Australia and New Zealand
	Daurian partridge	Perdix dauurica	East Asia from Kyrgyzstan and extending eastward to China and Mongolia
	Tibetan partridge	Perdix hodgsoniae	Tibet, Northern Pakistan via Kashmir into northwestern India, northern parts of Nepal, Sikkim and Bhutan, and western China.

Some prehistoric species have been identified:

- Perdix margaritae Kurochkin, 1985
- Perdix palaeoperdix Mourer-Chauviré, 1975

A prehistoric species only known from fossils was described as Perdix palaeoperdix. Occurring all over southern Europe during the Early–Late Pleistocene, it was eaten by the Cro-Magnons and Neanderthals. The relationships between the prehistoric species and the grey partridge are somewhat obscure; while very similar, they might be better understood as sister species rather than the grey partridge evolving from the Pleistocene taxon.

== Description ==
These are medium-sized partridges with dull-coloured bills and legs, streaked brown upperparts, and rufous tails with barring on the flanks. Neither sex has spurs on the legs, and the only plumage distinction is that females tend to be duller in appearance. Grey and Daurian partridges are very closely related and similar in appearance, and form a superspecies. Tibetan partridge has a striking black and white face pattern, black breast barring and 16 tail feathers instead of the 18 of the other species.

== Distribution ==
There are representatives of Perdix in most of temperate Europe and Asia. One member of the genus, the grey partridge, has been introduced to the United States and Canada for the purpose of hunting. These are non-migratory birds of the steppes and similar open country, though nowadays they are more associated with agricultural land. The nest is a lined ground scrape in or near cover. They feed on a wide variety of seeds and some insect food.

== Cultural references ==
The bird shares its name with the nephew of Daedalus of Greek mythology, who was transformed into the bird when his uncle murdered him in jealousy. He was killed when thrown headlong down from the sacred hill of Athena, so, mindful of his fall, the bird does not build its nest in the trees, nor take lofty flights, and avoids high places.

== Status ==
None of the species is threatened on a global scale, but the two more widespread partridges are over-hunted in parts of their range. The grey partridge has been badly affected by agricultural changes, and its range has contracted considerably. The Tibetan partridge seems secure in its extensive and often inaccessible range on the Tibetan Plateau.
