= Augustus Volney Waller =

British neurophysiologist

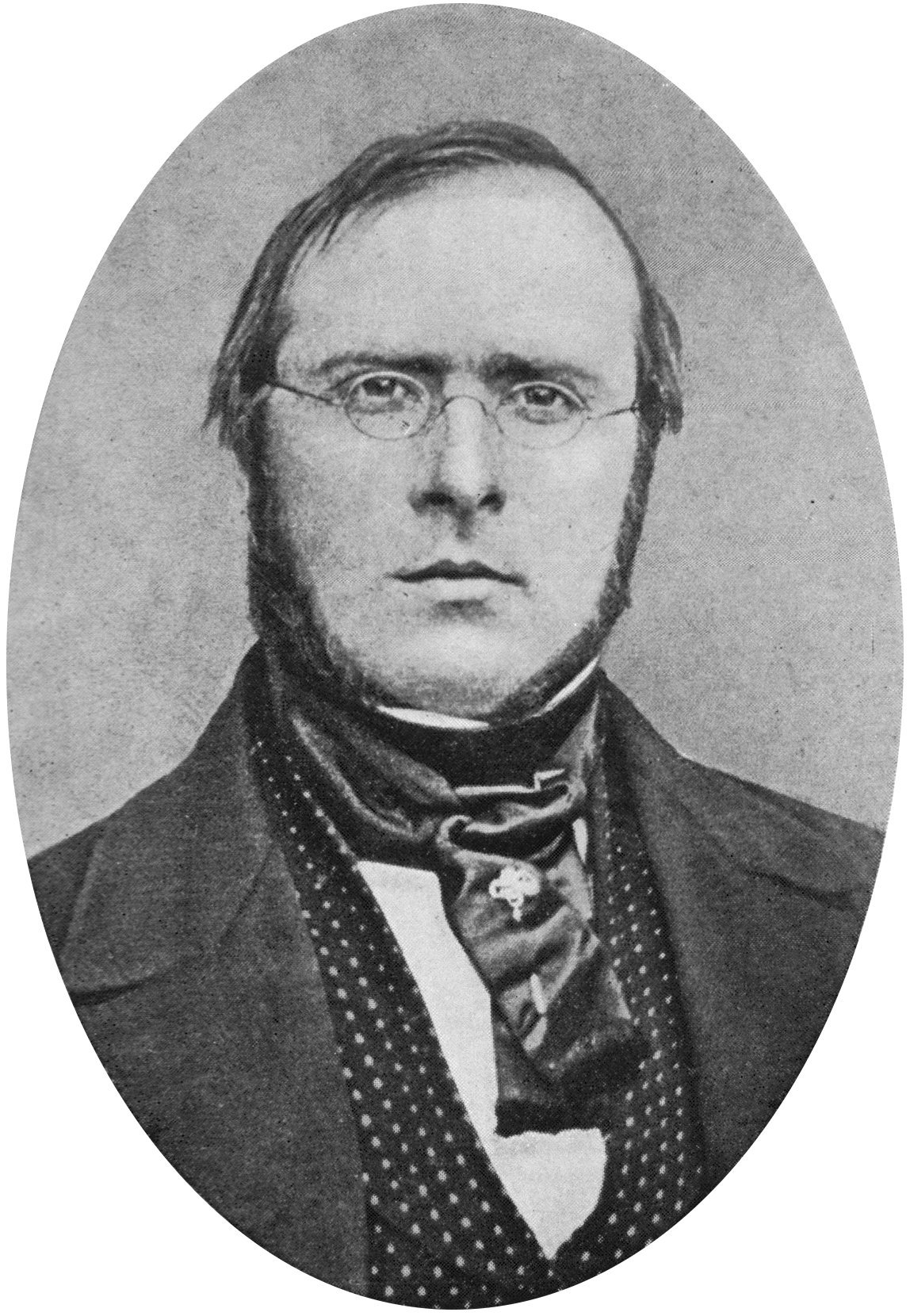
Augustus Volney Waller

Augustus Volney Waller FRS (21 December 1816 – 18 September 1870) was a British neurophysiologist. He was the first to describe the degeneration of severed nerve fibers, now known as Wallerian degeneration.

== Life ==
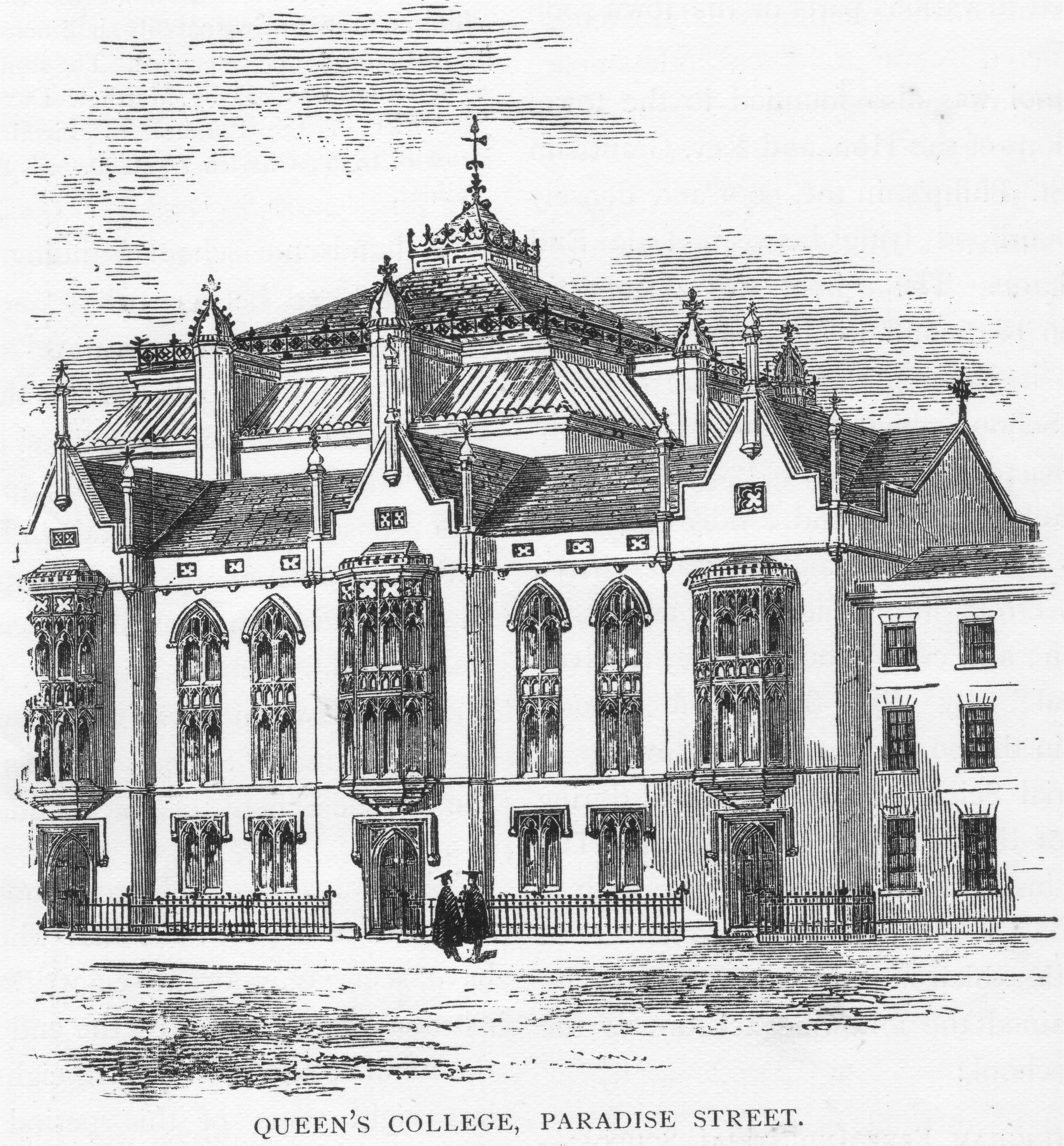
Queen's College, Birmingham, a predecessor college of Birmingham University

The son of William Waller of Elverton Farm, near Faversham, Kent, was born on 21 December 1816. His youth was spent at Nice, where his father died in 1830. Waller was then sent back to England, where he lived, first with Dr. Lacon Lambe of Tewkesbury, and afterwards with William Lambe the vegetarian. His father sharing Lambe's views, Augustus was brought up until the age of eighteen on a vegetarian diet.

Waller studied in Paris, where he obtained the degree of M.D. in 1840, and in the following year he was admitted a licentiate of the Society of Apothecaries in London. He then entered general medical practice at St. Mary Abbott's Terrace, Kensington. He soon acquired a considerable practice, but after the publication of two papers in the Philosophical Transactions for 1849 and 1850, he was elected a Fellow of the Royal Society in 1851. He gave up his practice the same year, and left England to live at Bonn and carry on his scientific work. Here he became associated with Professor Julius Ludwig Budge, and published papers in the Comptes Rendus for 1851 and 1852, on physiological subjects. For these papers he was awarded the Monthyon prize of the French Academy of Sciences for 1852, and for further work this prize was given to him a second time in 1856. The president and council of the Royal Society also awarded him one of their royal medals in 1860 in recognition of the importance of his physiological methods and researches.

Waller left Bonn in 1856, and went to Paris to continue his work in Flourens's laboratory at the Jardin des Plantes; but he soon contracted some form of infection, which left him an invalid for the next two years. He returned to England, and, his health improving, he accepted in 1858 the appointment of professor of physiology in Queen's College, Birmingham (a predecessor college of Birmingham University), and the post of physician to the hospital. These appointments he did not long retain. The heart affection which eventually proved fatal led him to seek rest, and, after staying two years longer in England, he retired first to Bruges and afterwards to Switzerland.

== Works ==
With renewed health, he moved to Geneva in 1868, with the purpose of practising as a physician, and he was almost immediately elected a member of the Société de Physique et d'Histoire Naturelle there. He paid a short visit to London in the spring of 1869 to deliver the Croonian lecture before the Royal Society, and he afterwards returned to Geneva, where he died suddenly of angina pectoris on 18 September 1870.

He demonstrated the cilio-spinal centre in the spinal cord and the vasoconstrictor action of the sympathetic; and he invented the degeneration method of studying the paths of nerve impulses. He practically rediscovered the power which the white corpuscles possess of escaping from the smallest blood-vessels, while some of his earlier work was concerned with purely physical problems.

The most important of Waller's papers are to be found in the ‘Comptes Rendus,’ in the ‘Philosophical Magazine,’ and in the ‘Philosophical Transactions.’ The Wallerian degeneration is described in the ‘Comptes Rendus,’ 1 Dec. 1851. The demonstration of the cilio-spinal centre was the result of work done jointly with Professor Budge, and is described in the ‘Comptes Rendus’ for October 1851. The function of the ganglion on the posterior root of each spinal nerve is published in the ‘Comptes Rendus’ (xxxv. 524). ‘The Microscopic Observations on the Perforation of the Capillaries by the Corpuscles of the Blood, and on the Origin of Mucus and Pus,’ appeared in the ‘Philosophical Magazine’ for November 1846, while the ‘Microscopic Investigations on Hail’ were printed in the same journal for July and August 1846 and March 1847.

== Family ==
He married, in 1842, Matilda, only daughter of John Walls of North End, Fulham, and by her had one son, Augustus Desiré Waller, M.D., F.R.S., the physiologist, and two daughters.
