= Ludwig von Sarnthein =

Ludwig von Sarnthein (4 January 1861, in Hermannstadt – 1 February 1914, in Hall, Tyrol) was a government administrator and botanist from the Austro-Hungarian Empire.

He obtained his education in Innsbruck, later serving as a government official in Brixen and Trieste (from 1892), Innsbruck (1905) and Ampezzo (1906), where he ultimately attained the rank of Bezirkshauptmann (district governor).

With Karl Wilhelm von Dalla Torre, he was co-author of works associated with the flora of Tyrol, Vorarlberg and Liechtenstein. As taxonomists, the two men co-described numerous botanical species.

- Flora der Gefürsteten Grafshaft Tirol, des Landes Vorarlberg und des Fürstenthumes Liechtenstein. Nach eigenen und fremden Beobachtungen, Sammlungen und den Litteraturquellen, (1900 to 1913) – Flora of Tyrol, Vorarlberg and Liechtenstein : According to our own observations and observations of others (with Dalla Torre).
  - Die Algen von Tirol, Vorarlberg und Liechtenstein, 1901.
  - Die Flechten (Lichenes) von Tirol, Vorarlberg und Liechtenstein, 1902.
  - Die Moose (Bryophyta) von Tirol, Vorarlberg und Liechtenstein, 1904.
  - Die Pilze (Fungi) von Tirol, Vorarlberg und Liechtenstein, 1905 (with Paul Wilhelm Magnus).
  - Die Farn- und Blütenpflanzen (Pteridophyta et Siphonogama) von Tirol, Vorarlberg und Liechtenstein, 1906.
