= Najas wrightiana =

Scientific classification
- Kingdom: Plantae
- Clade: Tracheophytes
- Clade: Angiosperms
- Clade: Monocots
- Order: Alismatales
- Family: Hydrocharitaceae
- Genus: Najas
- Species: N. wrightiana

Binomial name
- Najas wrightiana A.Braun

Synonyms
- Najas multidentata W.Koch; Najas wrightiana subsp. multidentata (W.Koch) R.T.Clausen

Species of aquatic plant

Najas wrightiana is a species of aquatic plant in the Hydrocharitaceae family. It is referred to by the common name Wright's waternymph, and is found in lakes and streams. It is native to Mexico, Guatemala, Belize, Honduras, the Bahamas, Cuba, and Venezuela. It is also considered introduced and naturalized in southern Florida.
