= Najas halophila =

Salt-loving water-nymph

Scientific classification
- Kingdom: Plantae
- Clade: Embryophytes
- Clade: Tracheophytes
- Clade: Spermatophytes
- Clade: Angiosperms
- Clade: Monocots
- Order: Alismatales
- Family: Hydrocharitaceae
- Genus: Najas
- Species: N. halophila

Binomial name
- Najas halophila L.Triest

Species of aquatic plant

Najas halophila is an aquatic plant species native to Java, New Guinea and Queensland, Australia.
