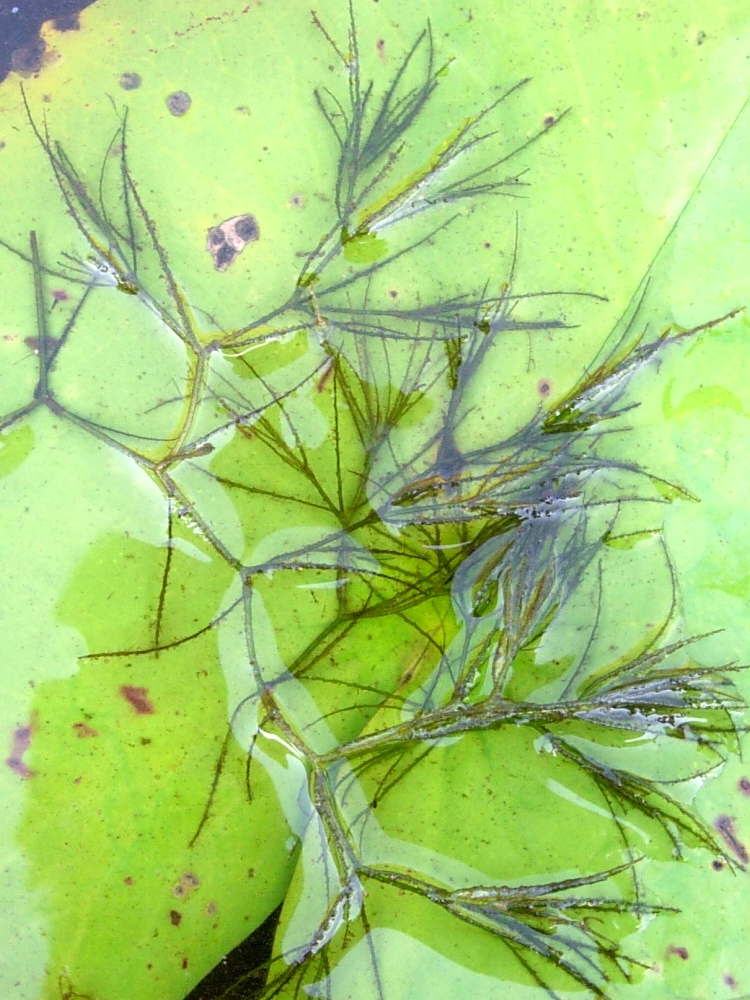

Scientific classification
- Kingdom: Plantae
- Clade: Tracheophytes
- Clade: Angiosperms
- Clade: Monocots
- Order: Alismatales
- Family: Hydrocharitaceae
- Genus: Najas
- Species: N. indica

Binomial name
- Najas indica (Willd.) Cham.

= Najas indica =

Species of aquatic plant

Najas indica is a species of aquatic plant found in freshwater habitats, especially still or slow-moving waters, like ponds and rice fields. The flowers are monoecious.

== Distribution ==
The natural distribution of this annual plant is India, China, Japan, Southeast Asia and New Guinea.
