= Najas kurziana =

Bihar water nymph

Scientific classification
- Kingdom: Plantae
- Clade: Tracheophytes
- Clade: Angiosperms
- Clade: Monocots
- Order: Alismatales
- Family: Hydrocharitaceae
- Genus: Najas
- Species: N. kurziana

Binomial name
- Najas kurziana Rendle

Species of plant

Najas kurziana, called the Bihar water nymph, is an aquatic plant growing in fresh water ponds. It is a rare and little-known species known from East Timor and from the State of Bihar in India. The species was initially discovered between Kishenganj and Oolabena, near the border with Nepal.
