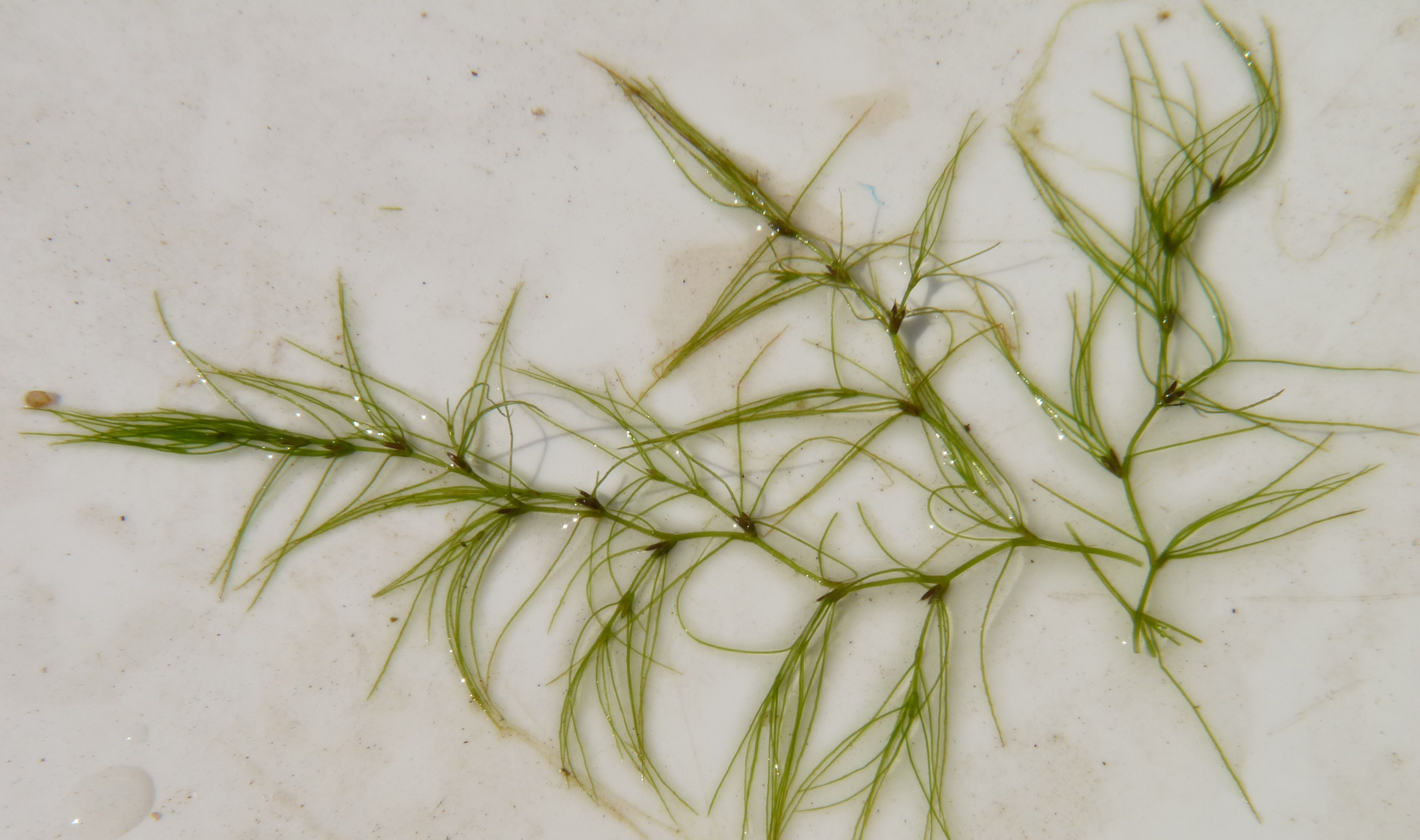

Conservation status
- Least Concern (IUCN 3.1)

Scientific classification
- Kingdom: Plantae
- Clade: Tracheophytes
- Clade: Angiosperms
- Clade: Monocots
- Order: Alismatales
- Family: Hydrocharitaceae
- Genus: Najas
- Species: N. gracillima

Binomial name
- Najas gracillima (A.Braun ex Engelm.) Magnus

SynonymsThe Plant List
- Caulinia amurensis (Tzvelev) Tzvelev; Caulinia japonica (Nakai) Nakai; Caulinia tenuissima subsp. amurensis Tzvelev; Najas indica var. gracillima A.Braun ex Engelm.; Najas japonica Nakai; Najas tenuissima subsp. amurensis (Tzvelev) Vorosch.

= Najas gracillima =

Species of aquatic plant

Najas gracillima, the slender waternymph, is a submerged species of aquatic plant in the Hydrocharitaceae family. found in lakes and streams. It is native to China (Fujian, Guangxi, Guizhou, Hainan, Hebei, Hubei, Jiangxi, Jilin, Liaoning, Nei Mongol, Taiwan, Yunnan, Zhejiang), Russian Far East (Amur and Khabarovsk), Japan, Korea, Taiwan, Iran, Alberta, Ontario, Newfoundland, Nova Scotia, New Brunswick, the eastern United States (every state east of the Mississippi River except Florida, plus Minnesota, Iowa, Missouri and the District of Columbia). It is also considered introduced and naturalized in France, Spain, Italy and California (Plumas and Tehama Counties).

Najas gracillima is a small aquatic annual with branching stems. The unisexual flowers ( each flower is only one sex) are produced in the axils of the branchlets and bases of the leaf sheaths. It is listed as endangered in Minnesota. It lives in soft-water lakes and ponds with mud and silt bottoms, and appears to be sensitive to water turbidity, warming, and eutrophication.
