= Najas grossareolata =

Sri Lankan water nymph

Scientific classification
- Kingdom: Plantae
- Clade: Tracheophytes
- Clade: Angiosperms
- Clade: Monocots
- Order: Alismatales
- Family: Hydrocharitaceae
- Genus: Najas
- Species: N. grossareolata

Binomial name
- Najas grossareolata L.Triest

Species of aquatic plant

Najas grossareolata, called the Sri Lankan water nymph, is an aquatic plant growing in fresh water ponds. It is a rare and little-known species known from Sri Lanka.
