= Najas madagascariensis =

Madagascar water nymph

Scientific classification
- Kingdom: Plantae
- Clade: Tracheophytes
- Clade: Angiosperms
- Clade: Monocots
- Order: Alismatales
- Family: Hydrocharitaceae
- Genus: Najas
- Species: N. madagascariensis

Binomial name
- Najas madagascariensis Rendle

Species of aquatic plant

Najas madagascariensis, called the Madagascar water nymph, is an aquatic plant growing in fresh water ponds. It is native known from Madagascar and naturalized on the Island of Mauritius.
