= Najas filifolia =

Conservation status
- Vulnerable (NatureServe)

Scientific classification
- Kingdom: Plantae
- Clade: Tracheophytes
- Clade: Angiosperms
- Clade: Monocots
- Order: Alismatales
- Family: Hydrocharitaceae
- Genus: Najas
- Species: N. filifolia

Binomial name
- Najas filifolia Haynes

Species of aquatic plant

Najas filifolia, the narrowleaf naiad or the needleleaf waternymph, is an aquatic plant in the Hydrocharitaceae. It is a rare and little-known species, known from only three counties (Decatur County, Georgia; Santa Rosa County, Florida; and Leon County, Florida. It is unusual in the genus in bearing fruits that are recurved to crescent-shaped.
