= Hypothalamospinal tract =

Details

Identifiers
- Latin: tractus hypothalamospinalis
- TA98: A14.1.05.329
- TA2: 6098
- FMA: 77482

The hypothalamospinal tract is an unmyelinated non-decussated descending nerve tract that arises in the hypothalamus and projects to the brainstem and spinal cord to synapse with pre-ganglionic autonomic (both sympathetic and parasympathetic) neurons.

The direct autonomic projections of the hypothalamospinal tract represent a minority of the autonomic output of the hypothalamus; most is thought to project to various relay structures.

== Anatomy ==
=== Origin ===
The tract originates mainly from the paraventricular nucleus of hypothalamus, with minor contributions from the dorsomedial, ventromedial, and posterior nuclei of hypothalamus, and lateral hypothalamus. The neurons of the hypothalamospinal tract receive direct afferents from the ascending nociceptive sensory spinohypothalamic tract to mediate the autonomic response to painful stimuli.

The tract terminates upon pre-ganglionic autonomic neurons in the brainstem, and spinal segments T1-L3 (sympathetic outflow), and S2-S4 (parasympathetic outflow).

=== Course/relations ===
The tract descends through the periaqueductal gray, through the dorsal longitudinal fasciculus, and adjacent to the reticular formation. In the brainstem, it descends in the lateral tegmentum of the midbrain, pons, and medulla oblongata. In the spinal cord, it descends in the dorsolateral quadrant of the lateral funiculus.

== Function ==
Fibers of the tract terminating at the spinal segment T1 synapse with second-order neurons which in turn synapse in the superior cervical ganglion with third-order neurons which provide sympathetic innervation to the eyelids, pupil, and skin of the face. The hypothalamospinal tract includes fibres by which the hypothalamus projects to the ciliospinal center in the spinal cord, a part of a brain circuit regulating pupillary dilatation as part of the pupillary reflex.

Some axons of the tract contain oxytocin.

== Clinical significance ==
Lesions of the hypothalamospinal tract above spinal cord level T1 cause ipsilateral Horner's syndrome, which is characterized by a triad of ptosis, miosis, and anhidrosis due to sympathetic denervation of the face.
