= Ludwig Julius Budge =

German physiologist

Ludwig Julius Budge (11 September 1811, in Wetzlar – 14 July 1888, in Greifswald) was a German physiologist.

He studied medicine at the Universities of Marburg, Berlin and Würzburg, and following graduation worked as a general practitioner in Wetzlar and Altenkirchen. In 1843 he was privat-docent to the medical faculty at Bonn, where he became an associate professor in 1847. In 1856 he was appointed professor of anatomy and physiology at the University of Greifswald.

He is known for his anatomical and physiological investigations of the autonomic nervous system, discovering that sympathetic nerve stimulation brings about pupillary dilatation and that oculomotor nerve stimulus produces constriction. With neurophysiologist Augustus Volney Waller, he was awarded the Prix Montyon by the French Académie des Sciences for research in identifying the segments of spinal cord that control operation of the ciliary muscles. The eponymous "Budge's center" is a synonym for the ciliospinal center. With Leonard Landois, he demonstrated the phenomena of cardiac arrest during electrical stimulation of the vagus nerve.

Also, he is credited with providing a comprehensive description of the liver's bile capillaries, and for conducting significant research involving the construction and growth of muscle associated with bile ducts.

== Selected works ==
- Die Lehre vom Erbrechen: Nach Erfahrungen und Versuchen, 1840 - The doctrine of vomiting: by experience and experimentation.
- Allgemeine Pathologie Als Erfahrungswissenschaft Basirt Auf Physiologie, 1845 - General pathology as an empirical science based on physiology.
- Neue Untersuchungen über das Nervensystem (with Augustus Volney Waller), 1851 - New studies of the nervous system.
- Über die Bewegung der Iris, 1855 - On movement involving the iris.
- Specielle Physiologie des Menschen: ein Leitfaden für Vorlesungen und zum Selbststudium, 1856 - Specialized human physiology: a guide for lectures and self-study.
