= Spinohypothalamic tract =

Details

Identifiers
- Latin: tractus spinohypothalamicus

The spinohypothalamic tract or spinohypothalamic fibers is a sensory fiber tract projecting from the spinal cord to the hypothalamus directly to mediate reflex autonomic and endocrine responses to painful stimuli (the hypothalamus receives additional indirect nociceptive projections from the reticular formation (see: spinoreticular tract), and periaqueductal gray (see: spinomesencephalic tract). The fibers of this tract synapse with hypothalamic neurons which in turn give rise to the hypothalamospinal tract that mediates the response of the autonomic nervous system to pain.
