= Ciliospinal center =

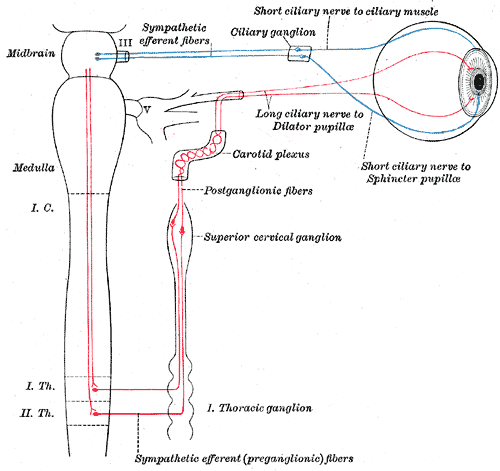
- Sympathetic connections of the ciliary and superior cervical ganglia. (Ciliospinal center not labeled, but region is situated in spinal cord segment T1-T2, which is labeled; red dots situated within ciliospinal center.) Pathway in blue actually represents parasympathetic pathway.

Details

Identifiers
- Latin: centrum ciliospinale

The ciliospinal center (also known as Budge's center) is a cluster of pre-ganglionic sympathetic neuron cell bodies located in the intermediolateral cell column (of the cornu laterale) at spinal cord segment (C8: Anatomic variation) T1-T2

It receives afferents from (the posterior part of) the hypothalamus via the (ipsilateral) hypothalamospinal tract which synapse with the center's pre-ganglionic sympathetic neurons. The efferent, pre-ganglionic axons then leave the spinal cord to enter and ascend in the sympathetic trunk to reach the superior cervical ganglion (SCG) where they synapse with post-ganglionic sympathetic neurons. The post-ganglionic neurons of the SCG then join the internal carotid nerve plexus of the internal carotid artery, accompanying first this artery and subsequently its branches to reach the orbit. In the orbit, they join the long ciliary nerves and short ciliary nerves to reach and innervate the dilator pupillae muscle to mediate pupillary dilatation as part of the pupillary reflex.

== History ==
It is associated with a reflex identified by Augustus Volney Waller and Ludwig Julius Budge in 1852.

== See also ==
- Horner's syndrome
