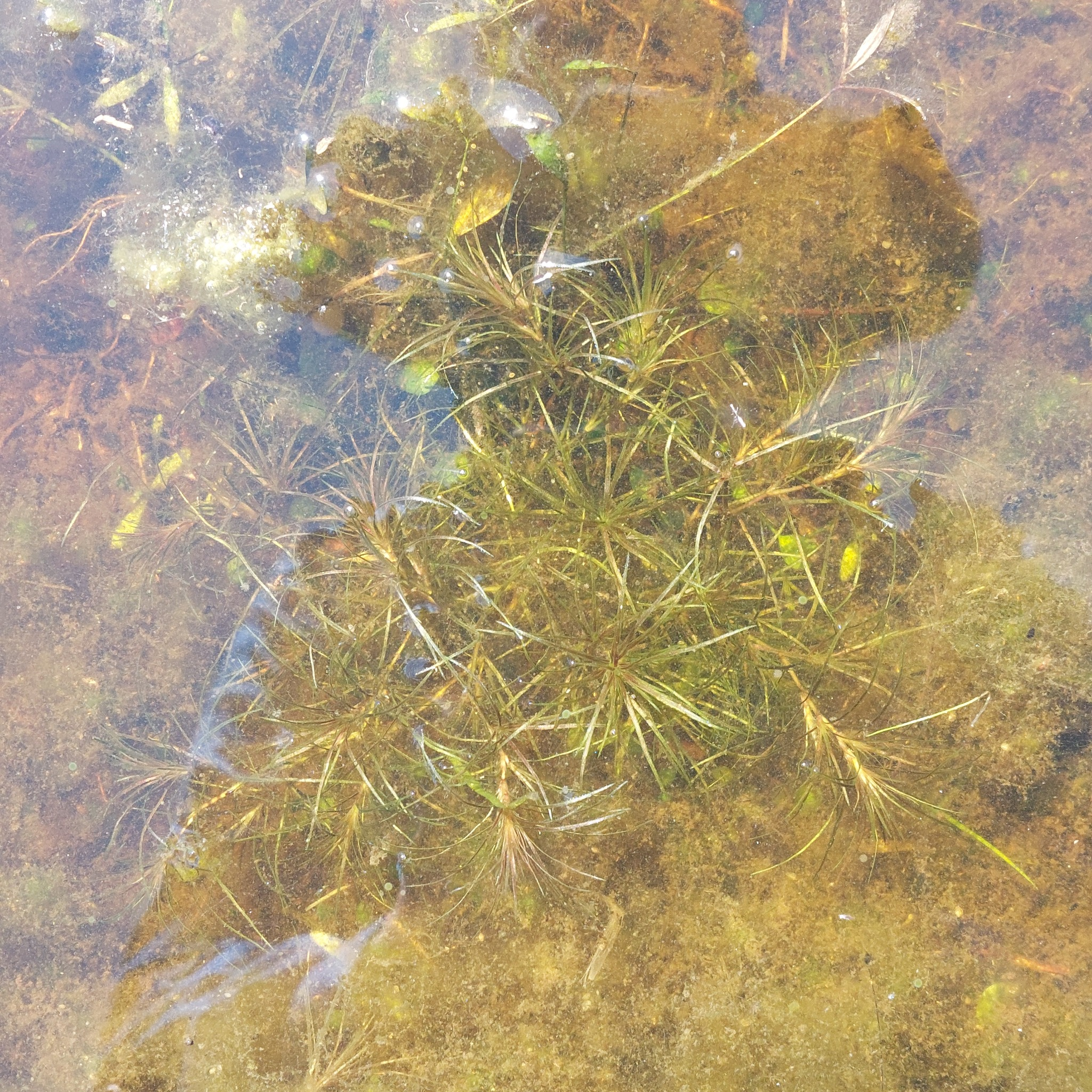
- Pilliga, NSW (2025-01-13)

Scientific classification
- Kingdom: Plantae
- Clade: Tracheophytes
- Clade: Angiosperms
- Clade: Monocots
- Order: Alismatales
- Family: Hydrocharitaceae
- Genus: Najas
- Species: N. tenuifolia

Binomial name
- Najas tenuifolia R.Br.

Synonyms
- Najas graminea var. tenuifolia (R.Br.) A.Braun; Najas leichhardtii Magnus

= Najas tenuifolia =

Species of aquatic plant

Najas tenuifolia is an aquatic plant growing in fresh water ponds. It is a native to Hong Kong, Thailand, Indonesia (Java, Maluku, Sulawesi, Bali, Lombok, Timor), the Philippines and Australia (every state and territory except Tasmania).

== Varieties and Subspecies ==
Four varietal are currently recognized:

- Najas tenuifolia var. celebica (Koord.) W.J.de Wilde - Sulawesi
- Najas tenuifolia var. pseudograminea (W.Koch) W.J.de Wilde - most of specific range
- Najas tenuifolia var. tenuifolia - Sulawesi, Australia

== Gallery ==
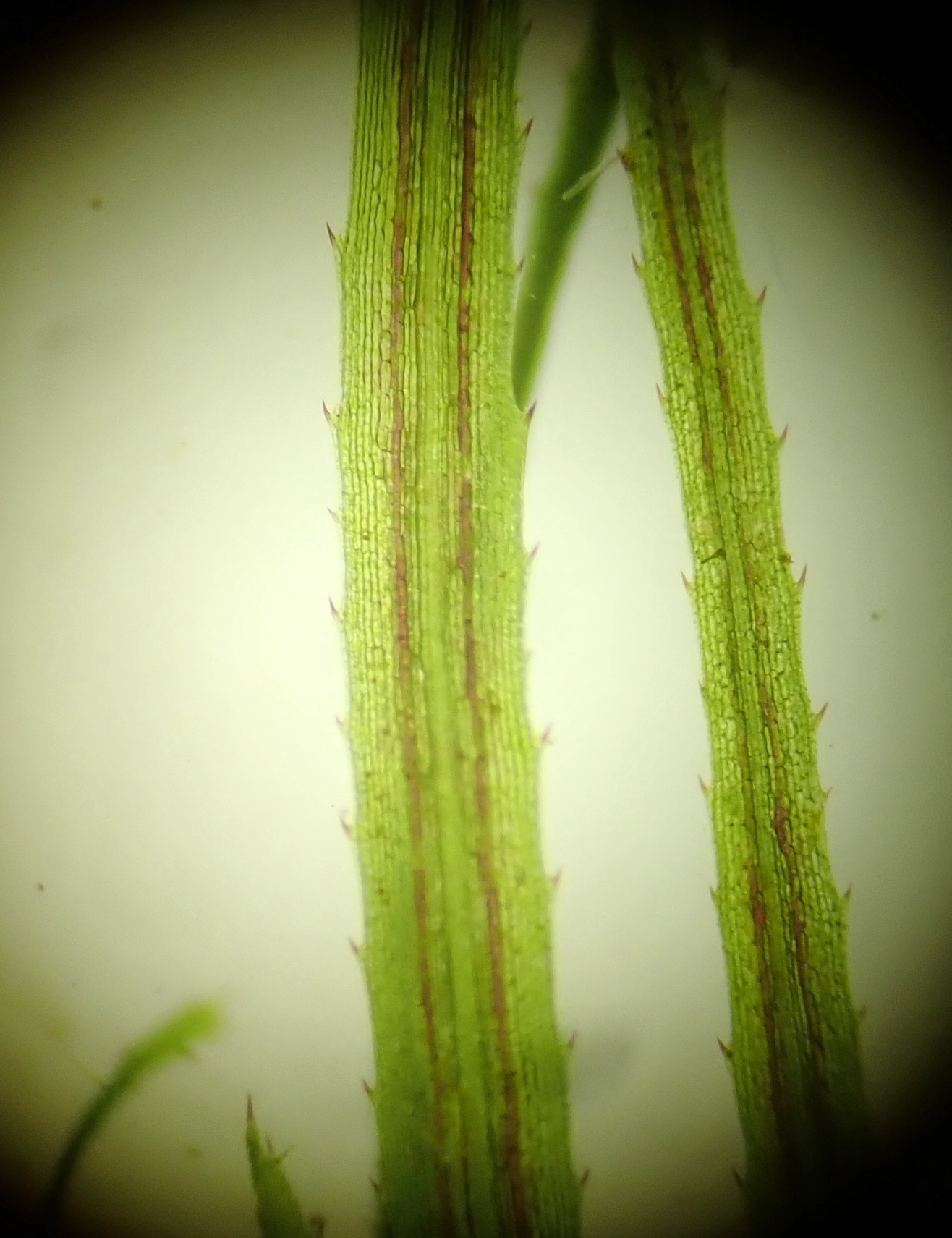

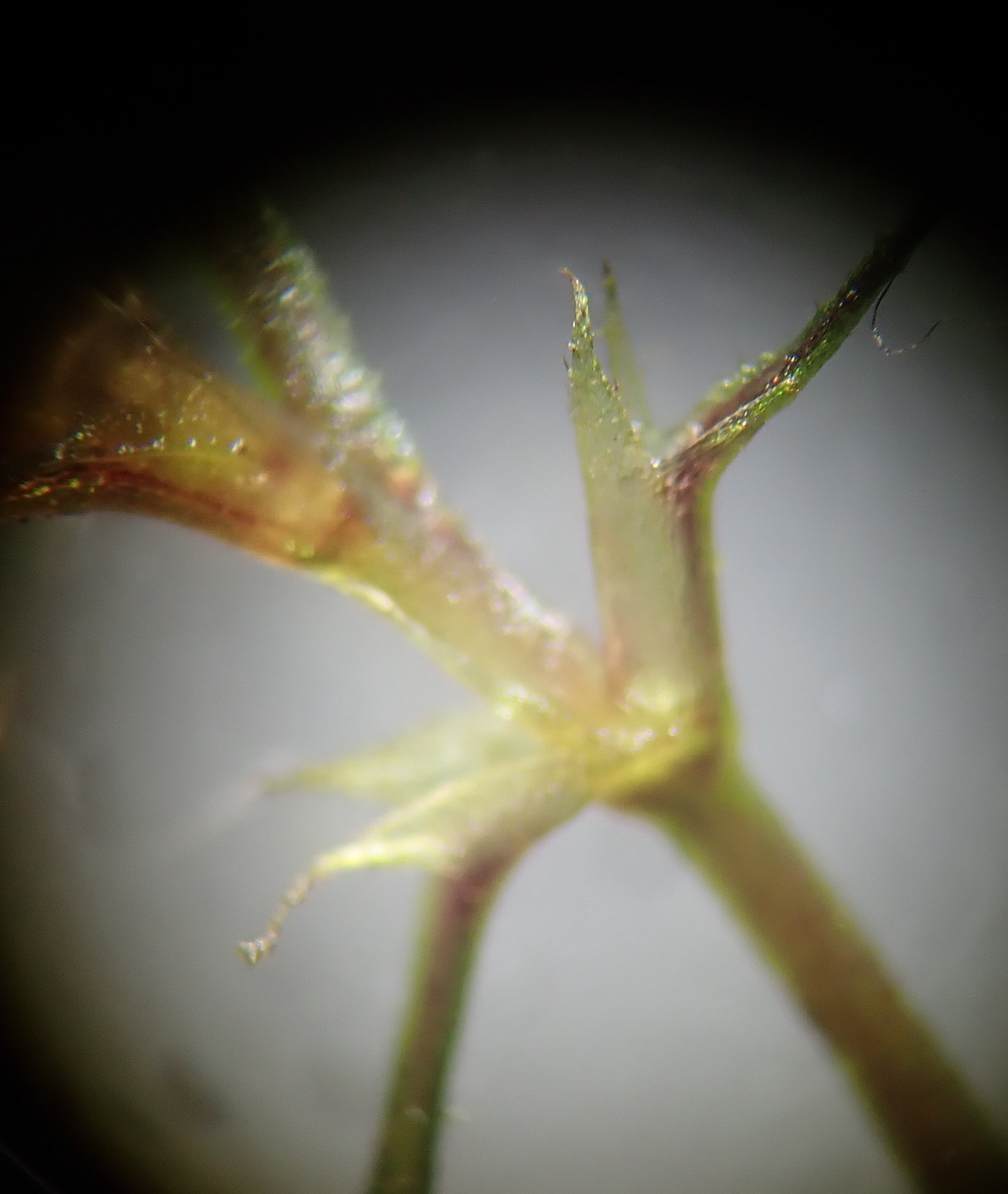

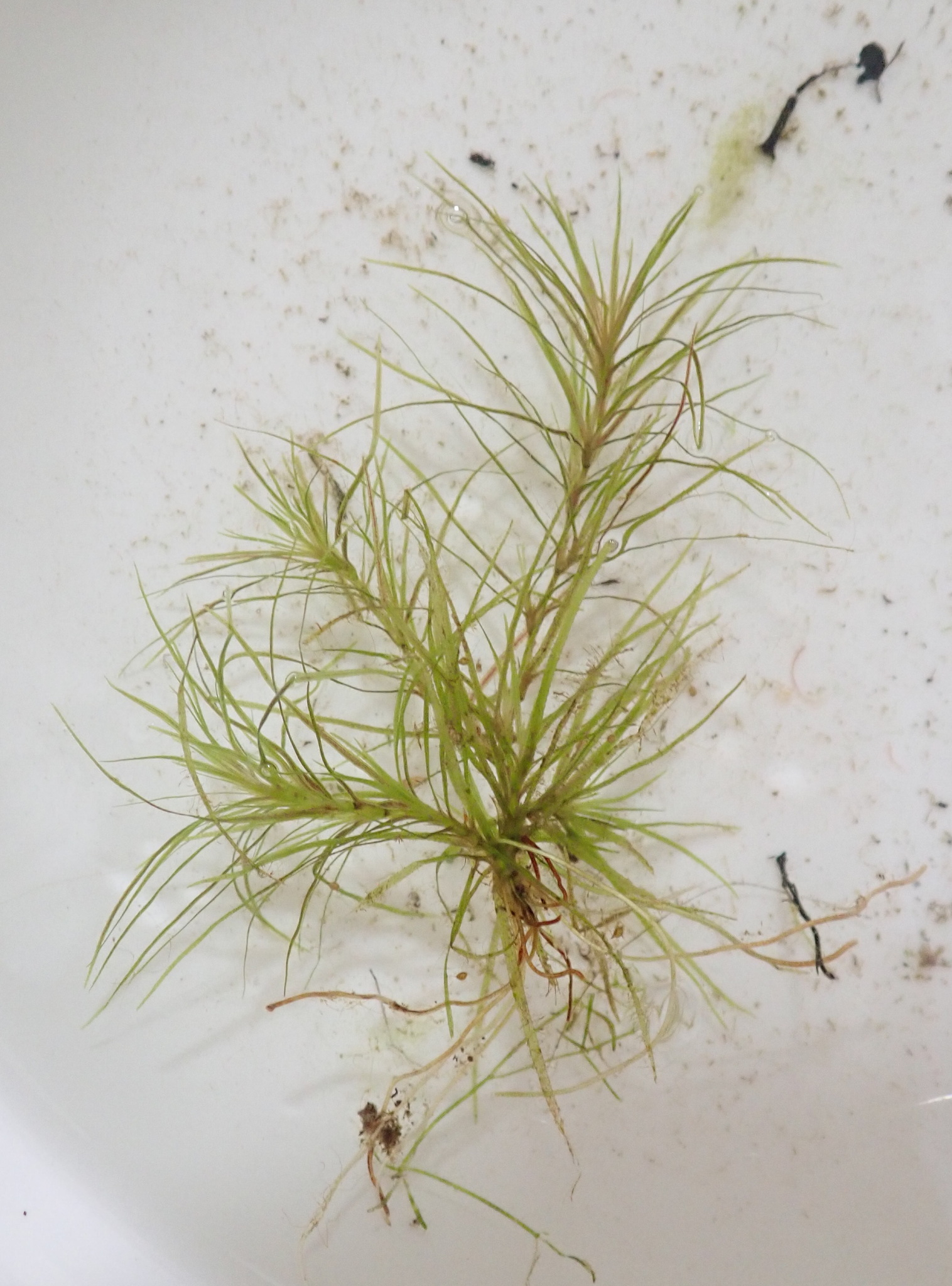

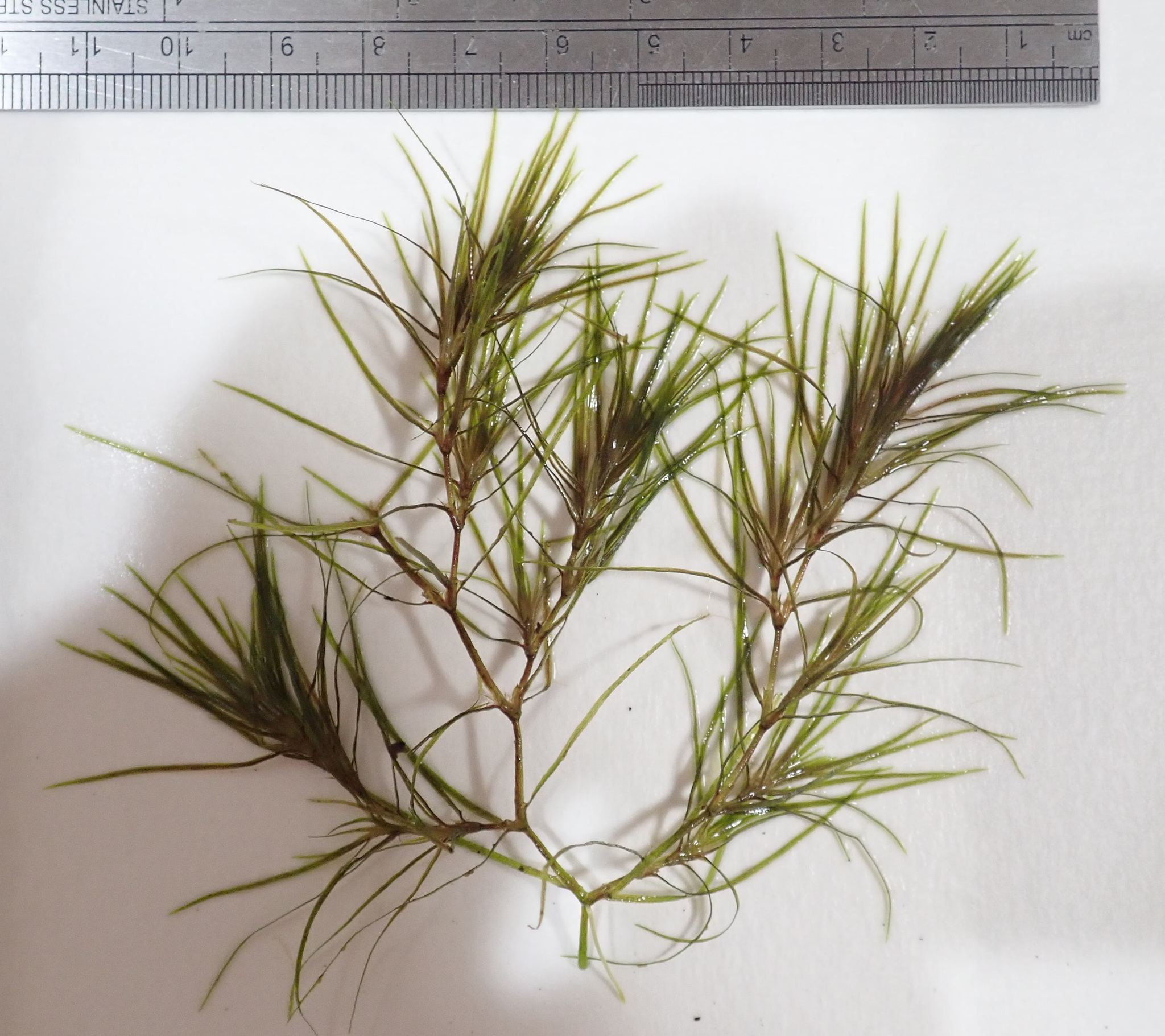
