= Hermann Landois =

German zoologist (1835–1905)

- Born: Hermann Landois; 19 March 1835
- Died: 29 January 1905 (aged 69)

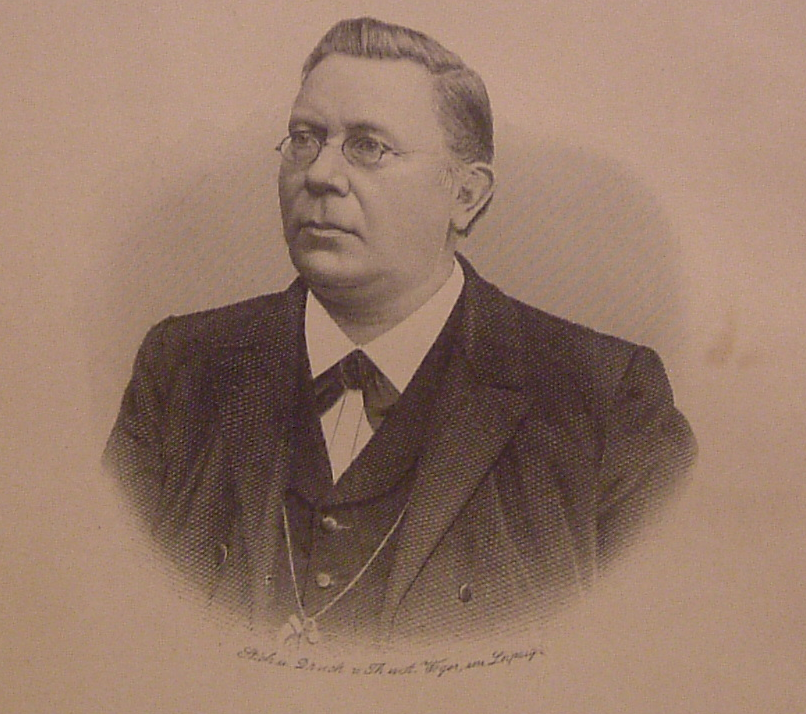
Hermann Landois

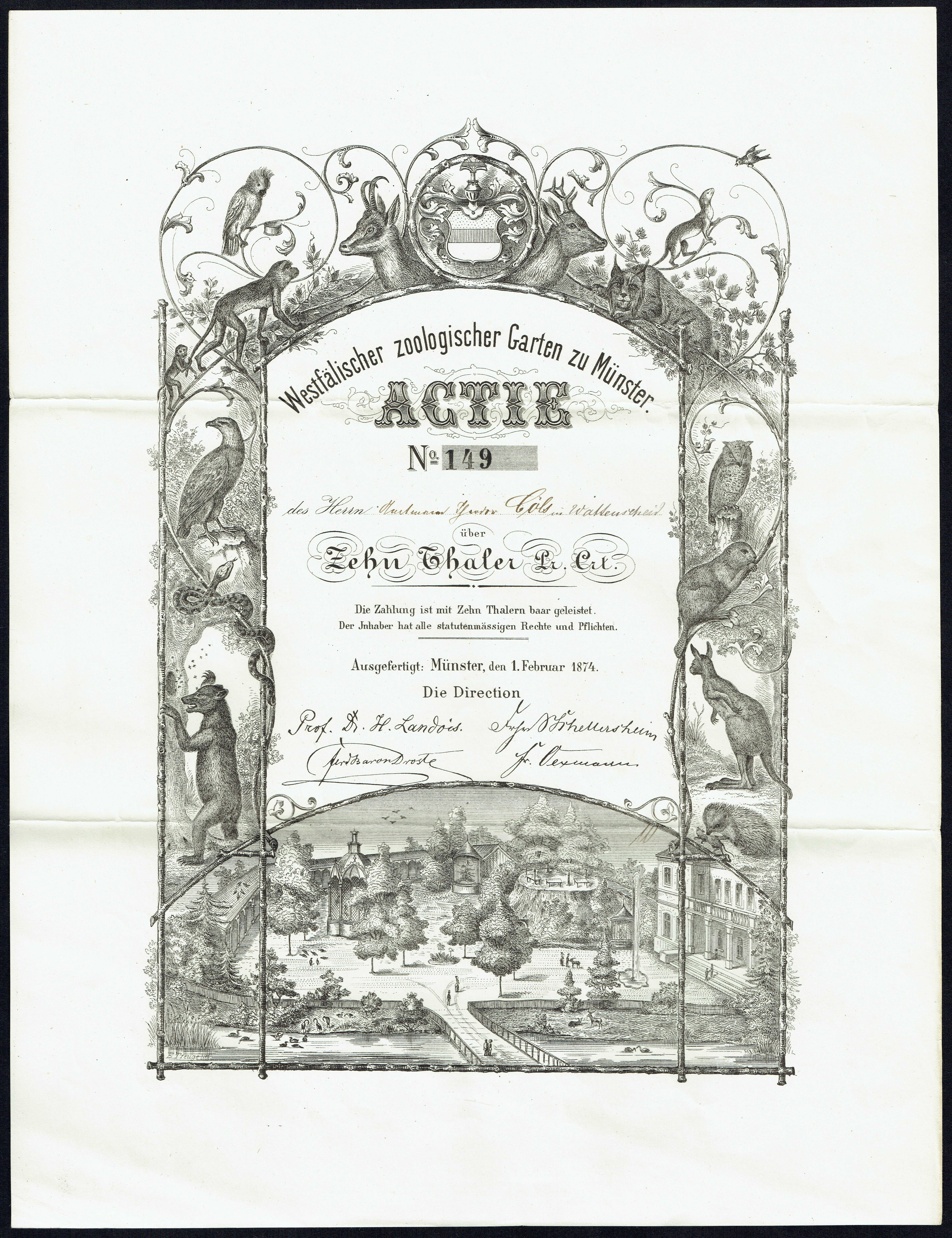
Share of the Westfälischer Zoologischer Garten zu Münster, issued 1. February 1874, signed by Hermann Landois

Hermann Landois (19 April 1835, Münster – 29 January 1905) was a German zoologist. He was the brother of physiologist Leonard Landois (1837–1902). He belonged to the Catholic popularizers of science who gained attraction in late nineteenth-century Germany.

He studied natural sciences and Catholic theology in Münster, where he was ordained as a priest in 1859. In 1863 he obtained his doctorate in zoology at the University of Greifswald, later becoming an associate professor of zoology at the Academy in Münster (1873).

In 1871 he founded the Westfälischen Vereins für Vogelschutz, Geflügel- und Singvögelzucht (Westphalian Association for bird protection, poultry and songbird breeding), and during the following year founded the Zoologischen Sektion für Westfalen und Lippe (Zoological Division of Westphalia and Lippe).

In 1875, he founded the Westphalian Zoo in Münster, a preserve with emphasis on European domestic mammals. It had a building for the display, cultivation and breeding of various fowl as well as aviaries for songbirds. In 1876 a "monkey house" was constructed. Eventually, the zoo expanded to include native fauna in general. By the end of 1882, the site had "niche displays" (dioramas) representing fauna from Australia, the North Sea coast, German forests, the African landscape, as well as a section that contained fossils from prehistoric Westphalia.

Among his students was the popular writer Hermann Löns.

== Selected writings ==
- Lehrbuch der Zoologie (with Bernard Altum), 1868.
- Thierstimmen, 1874.
- Das Studium der Zoologie mit besonderer Rücksicht auf das Zeichnen der Tierformen, 1905.
