= Najas hagerupii =

West African water nymph

Scientific classification
- Kingdom: Plantae
- Clade: Tracheophytes
- Clade: Angiosperms
- Clade: Monocots
- Order: Alismatales
- Family: Hydrocharitaceae
- Genus: Najas
- Species: N. hagerupii

Binomial name
- Najas hagerupii Horn

Species of aquatic plant

Najas hagerupii, called the West African water nymph, is an aquatic plant growing in fresh water rivers and ponds. It is a rare and little-known species known only from the West African nations of Ghana and Mali.
