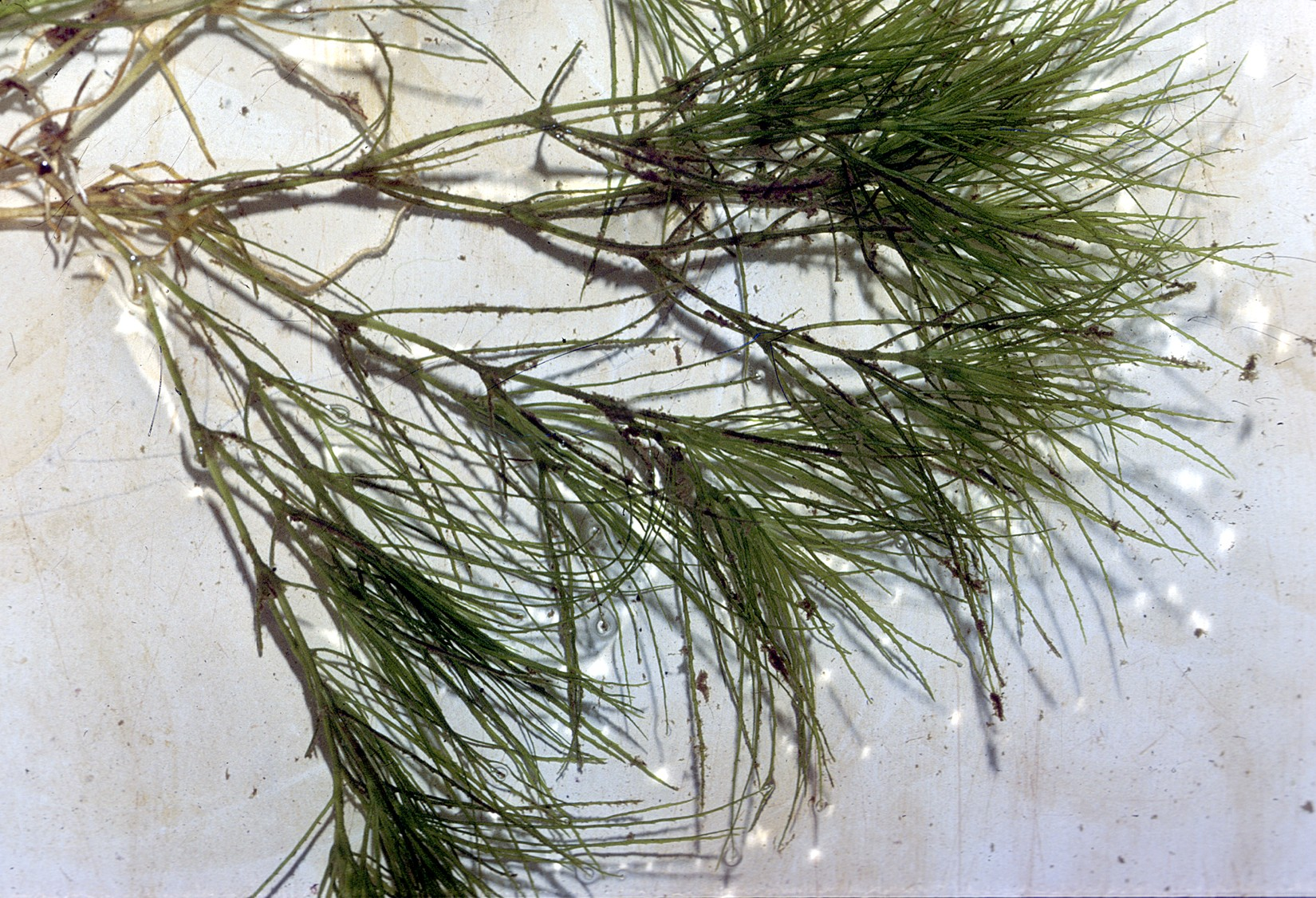
- Brittle naiad; note highly divided terminal heads

Scientific classification
- Kingdom: Plantae
- Clade: Tracheophytes
- Clade: Angiosperms
- Clade: Monocots
- Order: Alismatales
- Family: Hydrocharitaceae
- Genus: Najas
- Species: N. minor

Binomial name
- Najas minor All.

Synonyms
- Caulinia fragilis Willd.; Caulinia minor (All.) Coss. & Germ.; Fluvialis minor (All.) Pers.; Ittnera minor (All.) C.C.Gmel.; Najas dichotoma Roxb.; Najas fragilis (Willd.) Delile; Najas minor var. intermedia Ces.; Najas minor var. longifolia R.Corti; Najas minor var. spinosa Rendle; Najas moshanensis N.Z.Wang; Najas subulata Thuill.; Najas ternata Roxb. ex Griff.

= Najas minor =

Brittle waternymph

Species of aquatic plant

Najas minor, known as brittle naiad or brittle waternymph, is an annual aquatic plant, a submersed herb. It is native to Europe, Asia and North Africa from the Netherlands to Morocco east to Japan and the Philippines, including China, Siberia, Central Asia, Iran, Turkey, Ukraine, Germany, France Italy and a host of other countries. It is now introduced to North America and considered a weedy invasive species in the eastern half of the United States from Florida to Oklahoma to New Hampshire to Ontario to South Dakota. This plant prefers calm waters, such as ponds, reservoirs, and lakes, and is capable of growing in depths up to 4 meters.

== Identification ==
Najas minor grows in dense clusters and has highly branched stems. These stems fragment easily and this plant is capable of propagation from stem fragments or from small seeds which grow along its stem. The small flowers are located in clusters along the leaf axils. The leaves of the plant are opposite, unbranched, strap-shaped, and are around 4.5 centimeters in length. The leaves have serrations which are visible to the naked eye. This plant is similar in morphology to coontail or slender naiad.

== Distribution ==
Najas minor is distributed widely in the Northern Hemisphere, such as Canada, the United States, Japan, China, Europe. This species is also reported from tropical Asia (Thailand), but the report is now recognized as an identification error.

== Invasive spread and control ==
Brittle naiad was introduced to the United States, where it is considered an invasive species or noxious weed, in the 1900s. Brittle naiad in the United States is established in the Mid-Atlantic States. Established populations are found as far west as Oklahoma and Ontario, Canada in the north. The presence of this plant is a problem because its dense growth covers wide areas, inhibiting the growth of native species of aquatic macrophytes. The thick, clustering growths of brittle naiad can make fishing access or the operation of a boat difficult in a pond or lake. Brittle naiad may spread to new areas by stem fragments carried on a boat's hull, deck, propeller, or trailer. Control measures for brittle naiad include the use of aquatic herbicides, but application of chemicals may not destroy the seeds. Grass carp are another widely used control measure and have been known to readily consume brittle naiad plants. Mechanical harvesting of brittle naiad is difficult, as the brittle stems readily break and are easily disbursed throughout the system. As with most invasive species, prevention of an infestation is easier than eradication.
