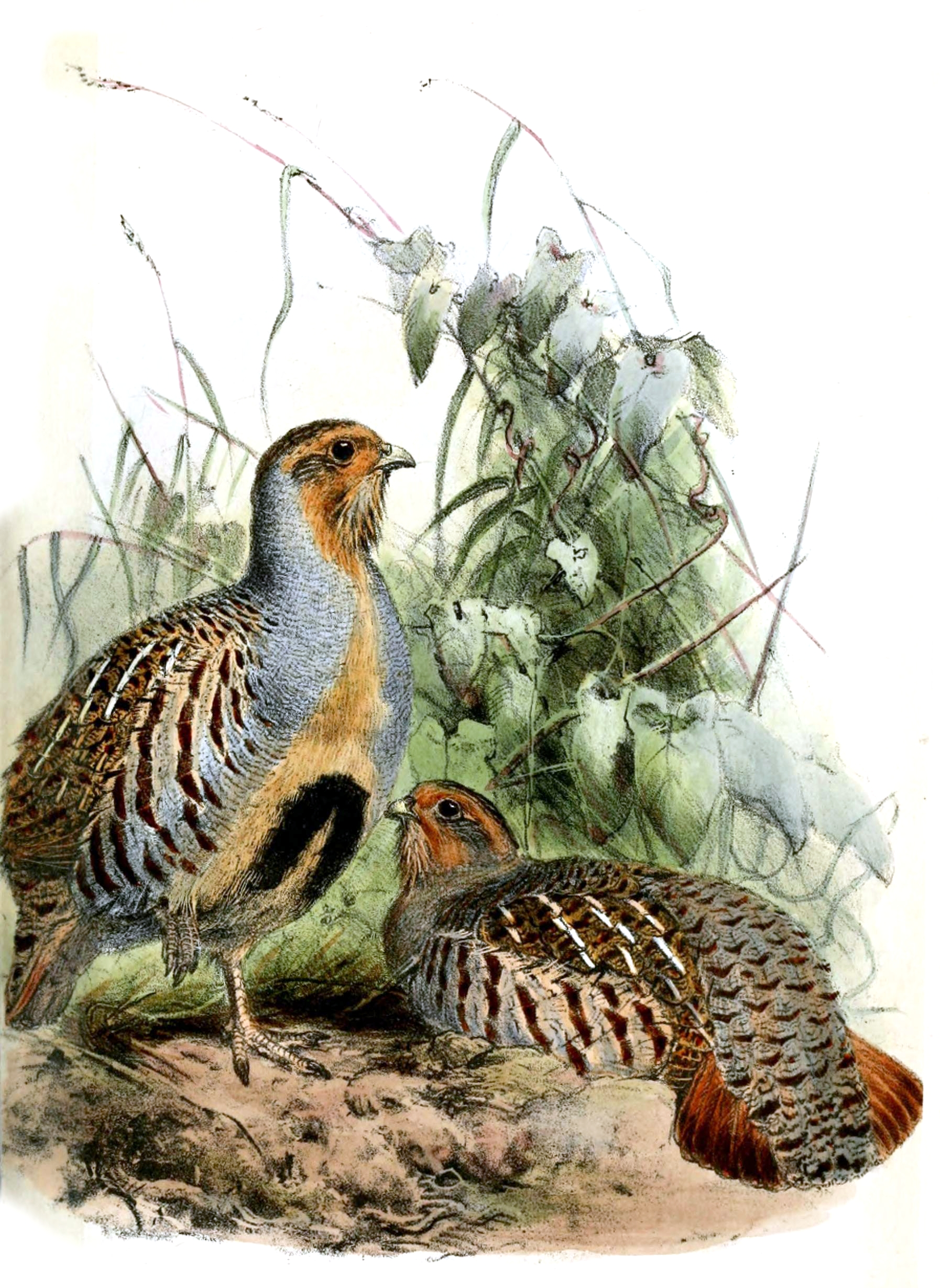

Conservation status
- Least Concern (IUCN 3.1)

Scientific classification
- Kingdom: Animalia
- Phylum: Chordata
- Class: Aves
- Order: Galliformes
- Family: Phasianidae
- Genus: Perdix
- Species: P. dauurica

Binomial name
- Perdix dauurica (Pallas, 1811)

= Daurian partridge =

Species of bird

The Daurian partridge (Perdix dauurica), also known as steppe partridge, Asian grey partridge or bearded partridge, is a gamebird in the pheasant family Phasianidae of the order Galliformes (gallinaceous birds). Its name derives from the Dauria region of Russia, which forms part of their distribution.

== Description ==
It is a rotund bird measuring roughly 28–30 cm (11–12 in) long. In the fall, males weigh about 200–340 grams (7.1–12.0 oz) and 290–330 grams (10–12 oz) for females. Both sexes have a sandy-orange face and long feathers under the beak, forming a 'beard'. The rest of the head and underparts are pale slate-grey with a buff line on the chest and black belly patch. The female has a smaller belly patch and is slightly duller than the male. Their song sounds like a higher-pitched, sped-up version of the grey partridge's; a shrill, grating kieerr-ik!

There are multiple subspecies, differing mainly in the plumage becoming darker and more rufous further east.

== Distribution and habitat ==
This partridge breeds generally on open grassland or steppe including farmland across much of temperate East Asia from Kyrgyzstan and extending eastward to China and Mongolia. It is a non-migratory terrestrial species, which forms flocks outside the breeding season in Autumn and Winter. In parts of its range, it overlaps with the very similar and closely related grey partridge, with which it forms a superspecies. They inhabit open country, ideally with some adjacent bushes or open woodland.

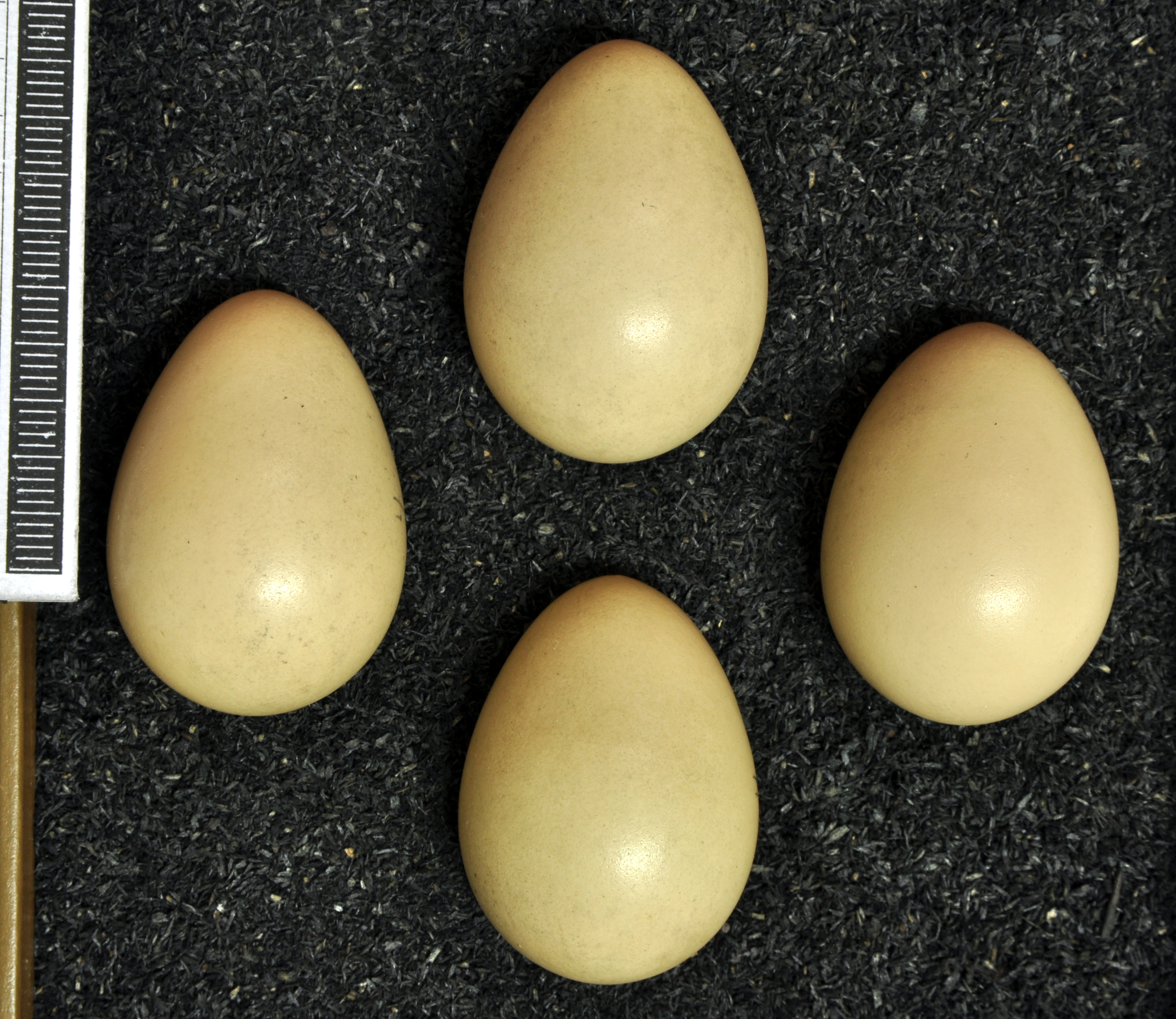
Four eggs, at Museum Wiesbaden

== Behaviour ==
Daurian partridges forage and move most actively during morning/evening hours and rest at mid-day, depending on weather.

Females usually lay around the second to third week of May. The nest is lined with grasses and twigs on the ground under a bush or in tall grass, and the typical clutch size is somewhere around 13–20 olive-brown eggs. Chicks are a pale yellow-brown dappled with shades of dark brown and rufous.

This is a seed-eating species, but the chicks in particular consume insects as an essential protein supply. They are capable of flying short distances around 2 weeks of age. When disturbed, it springs upward with whirring wings in a rapid, explosive manner, then it flies off to nearby cover, all while sounding off an alarmed staccato hek-hek-hek!

== Subspecies ==
The daurian partridge has two recognized subspecies:

- P. d. dauurica (Pallas, 1811)
- P. d. suschkini (Poliakov, 1915)

== Status ==
The Daurian partridge is not globally threatened, but may be over-hunted in parts of its range.

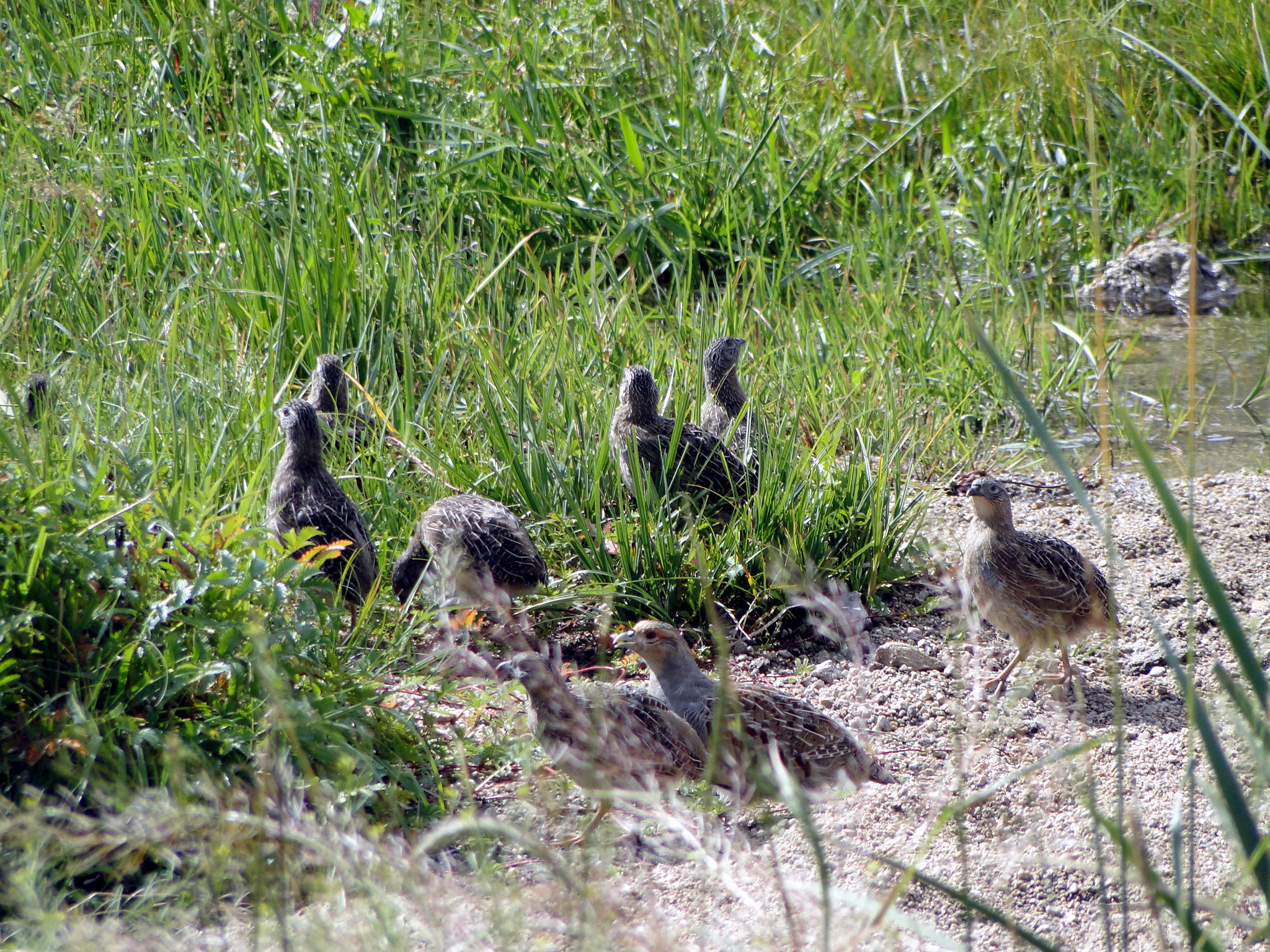
A Daurian partridge family
