= Leonard Landois =

German physiologist

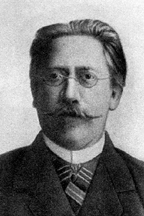
Leonard Landois

Leonard Landois (1 December 1837 – 17 November 1902) was a German physiologist born in Münster.

He studied medicine at the University of Greifswald, and was later a professor and director of the institute of physiology at Greifswald. In 1866 he became a member of the German Academy of Sciences Leopoldina. He was a younger brother to zoologist Hermann Landois (1835–1905) and son-in-law to botanist Theodor Marsson (1816–1892).

His earlier work involved research in the field of parasitology, conducting studies of bed bugs, dog fleas and the parasitic worm Botriocephalus latus. He also conducted studies on the ossification processes that take place in cartilage, tendons and connective tissue. With this instructor, Ludwig Julius Budge (1811–1888), he investigated the phenomena of cardiac arrest during electrical stimulation of the vagus nerve.

Leonard Landois was a pioneer in the study of blood transfusions and the phenomena of agglutination. In 1875, he demonstrated that when red blood cells are taken from one species of animal and are mixed with serum taken from an animal of a different species, the red cells typically clump and sometimes burst (hemolyze).

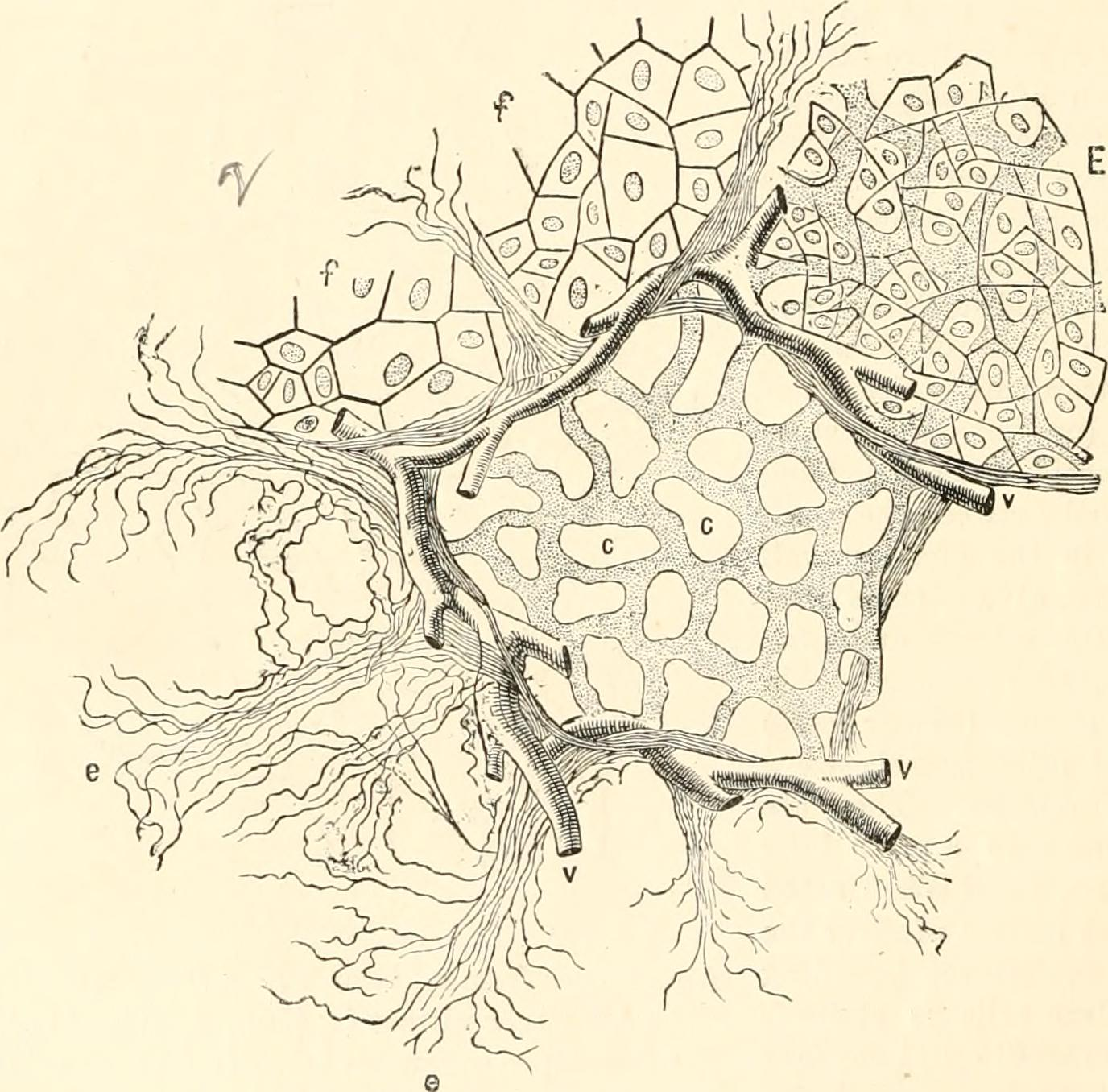
A manual of human physiology

== Selected writings ==
- Über der Haarbalgparasiten des Menschen (treatise on parasites of humans); (1861)
- Anatomische Untersuchungen über den Bau der Araneiden. In: Archiv für Anatomie, Physiologie und wissenschaftliche Medizin, Jg. 1868, S. 240–255; with Reinhold Wilhelm Buchholz. (Anatomical studies on the construction of orb-weaver spiders).
- Die Transfusion des Blutes (On blood transfusion); (1875)
- Lehrbuch der Physiologie des Menschen (Textbook of human physiology); (1880) Digital 4th edition from 1885 by the University and State Library Düsseldorf
- Die Urämie (treatise on uremia); (1890)
