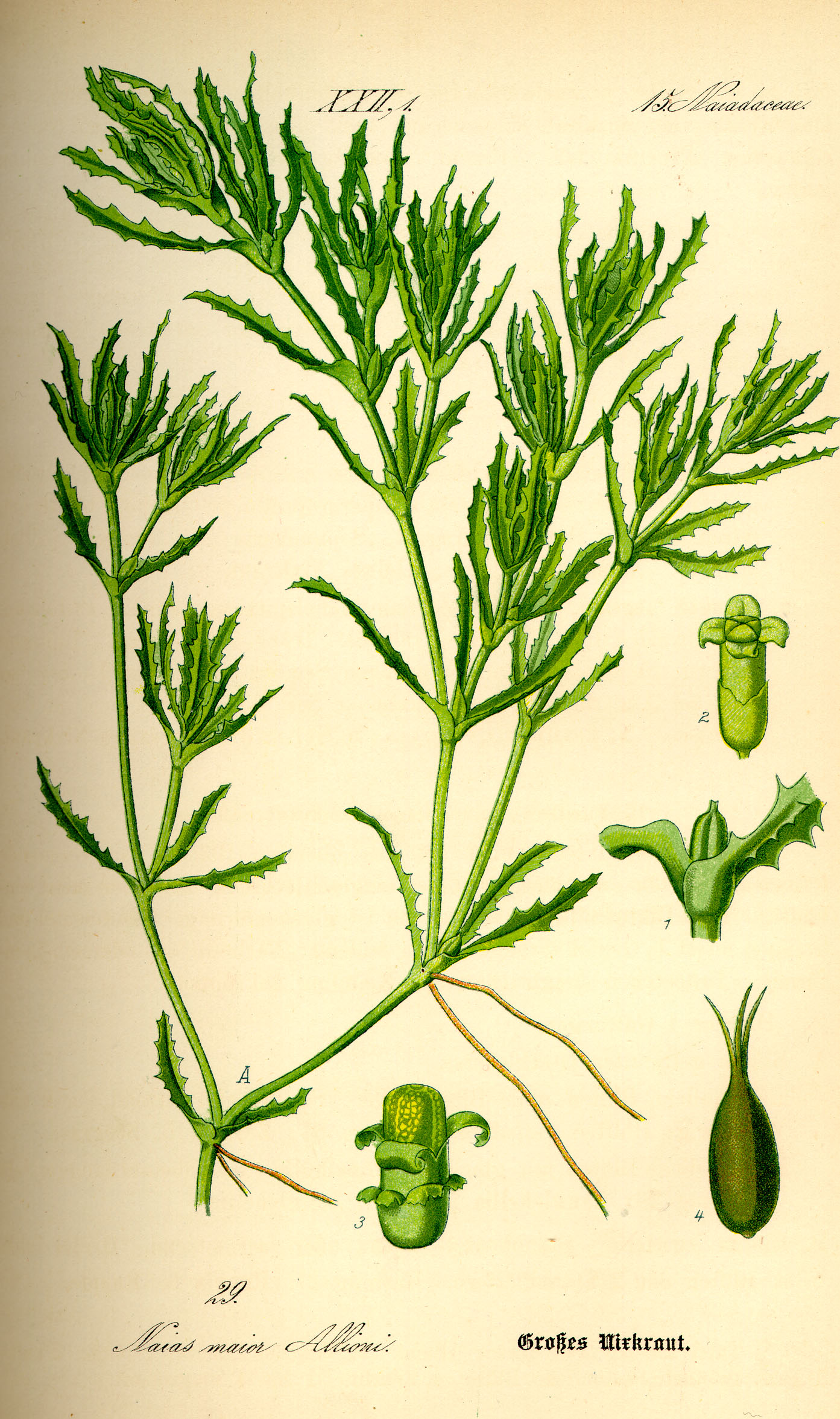
- Najas marina

Scientific classification
- Kingdom: Plantae
- Clade: Embryophytes
- Clade: Tracheophytes
- Clade: Spermatophytes
- Clade: Angiosperms
- Clade: Monocots
- Order: Alismatales
- Family: Hydrocharitaceae
- Subfamily: Hydrilloideae
- Genus: Najas; L.

Synonyms
- Fluvialis Ség; Caulinia Willd.; Ittnera C.C.Gmel.

= Najas =

Genus of aquatic plants

Najas, the water-nymphs or naiads, is a genus of aquatic plants. It is cosmopolitan in distribution, first described for modern science by Linnaeus in 1753. Until 1997, it was rarely placed in the Hydrocharitaceae, and was often taken as constituting (by itself) the family Najadaceae.

The APG II system, of 2003 (unchanged from the APG system, of 1998), places the genus in family Hydrocharitaceae, in the order Alismatales of the monocots.

An infrageneric classification of two sections is proposed: Section Americanae and sect. Caulinia.

Species

- Najas affinis Rendle - South America, Senegal, Guinea-Bissau
- Najas ancistrocarpa A.Braun ex Magnus - China, Japan, Taiwan
- Najas arguta Kunth - Cuba, Costa Rica, Panama, South America
- Najas australis Bory ex Rendle - India, Madagascar, Mauritius, KwaZulu-Natal, Seychelles
- Najas baldwinii Horn - West Africa
- Najas brevistyla Rendle - Assam
- Najas browniana Rendle - southern China, India, Taiwan, Java, Cavern Island in Northern Territory of Australia
- Najas chinensis N.Z.Wang - Primorye, China, Taiwan, Japan
- Najas conferta (A.Braun) A.Braun - Cuba, Hispaniola, Panama, Brazil
- Najas faveolata A. Br. ex Magnus
- Najas filifolia R.R.Haynes - southeastern United States (Georgia, Alabama, Florida)
- Najas flexilis (Willd.) Rostk. & W.L.E. Schmidt - temperate Northern Hemisphere
- Najas gracillima (A.Braun ex Engelm.) Magnus - Asia, North America
- Najas graminea Delile - Africa, Asia, New Guinea, Melanesia, northern Australia; naturalized in California and parts of Europe
- Najas grossareolata L.Triest - Sri Lanka
- Najas guadalupensis (Spreng.) Magnus - North and South America, Caribbean
- Najas hagerupii Horn - Ghana, Mali
- Najas halophila L.Triest - Java, New Guinea, Queensland
- Najas heteromorpha Griff. ex Voigt - eastern India
- Najas horrida A.Braun ex Magnus - Africa, Madagascar, Sinai
- Najas indica (Willd.) Cham. - Indian Subcontinent, China, Southeast Asia, New Guinea
- Najas kurziana Rendle - Bihar, East Timor
- Najas madagascariensis Rendle - Madagascar; naturalized in Mauritius
- Najas malesiana W.J.de Wilde - India, Bangladesh, Indochina, Malaysia, Indonesia, Philippines; naturalized in eastern Brazil
- Najas marina L. - widespread and nearly cosmopolitan
- Najas minor All. - widespread in Europe, Asia, Africa; naturalized in eastern North America
- Najas oguraensis Miki - East Asia, Himalayas (Pakistan, Nepal, northern India)
- Najas pectinata (Parl.) Magnus - Sahara
- Najas pseudogracillima L.Triest - Hong Kong
- Najas rigida Griff. - eastern India
- Najas schweinfurthii Magnus - Senegal, Cameroon, Ethiopia, Sudan, Tanzania
- Najas tenuicaulis Miki - Honshu Island in Japan
- Najas tenuifolia R.Br. - Hong Kong, Southeast Asia, Australia
- Najas tenuis Magnus – India, Sri Lanka, Myanmar
- Najas tenuissima (A.Braun ex Magnus) Magnus - Finland, Russia, Hokkaido
- Najas testui Rendle - western + central Africa
- Najas welwitschii Rendle - tropical Africa, western India
- Najas wrightiana A.Braun - Mexico, Central America, Cuba, Bahamas, Venezuela; naturalized in Florida
