= Bernard Altum =

German priest and zoologist (1824–1900)

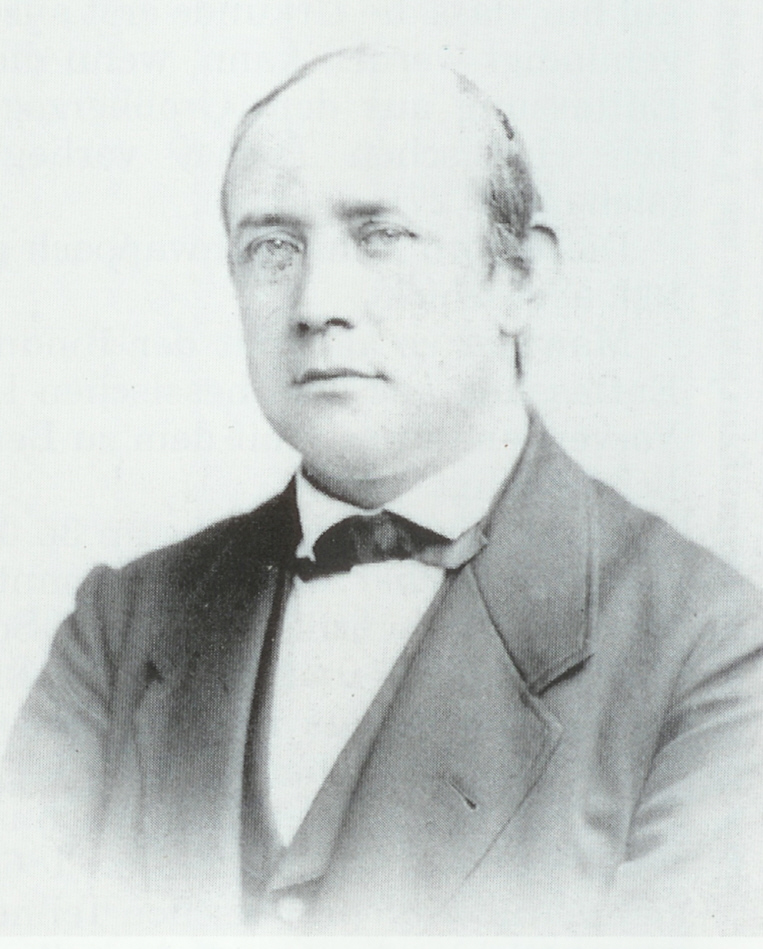

Johann Bernard Theodor Altum (31 January 1824 – 1 February 1900) was a German Catholic priest, zoologist, and forest scientist who also engaged in popularizing his religiously grounded understanding of science.

== Background ==
Altum was born to shoemaker Bernard Theodor Altum and Anna Gertrude Antonette Huder of Münster, Province of Westphalia. After going to local elementary schools, he entered Paulinum Gymnasium (Münster) and graduated in 1845. Altum studied philosophy and theology in Münster, and was ordained as a priest in 1849. Later, his interests turned to zoology, a discipline that he studied under Johannes Peter Müller and Martin Lichtenstein in Berlin, obtaining a doctorate in 1855 with a thesis comparing Homer, Aeschylus, Sophocles and Euripides. From 1859 he was a lecturer at the University of Münster, then relocated in 1869 to the Academy of Forestry in Eberswalde as a successor to Julius Theodor Christian Ratzeburg.

In his earlier work, his research primarily dealt with mammals and birds; after moving to Eberswalde, his studies were largely in the field of forest entomology.

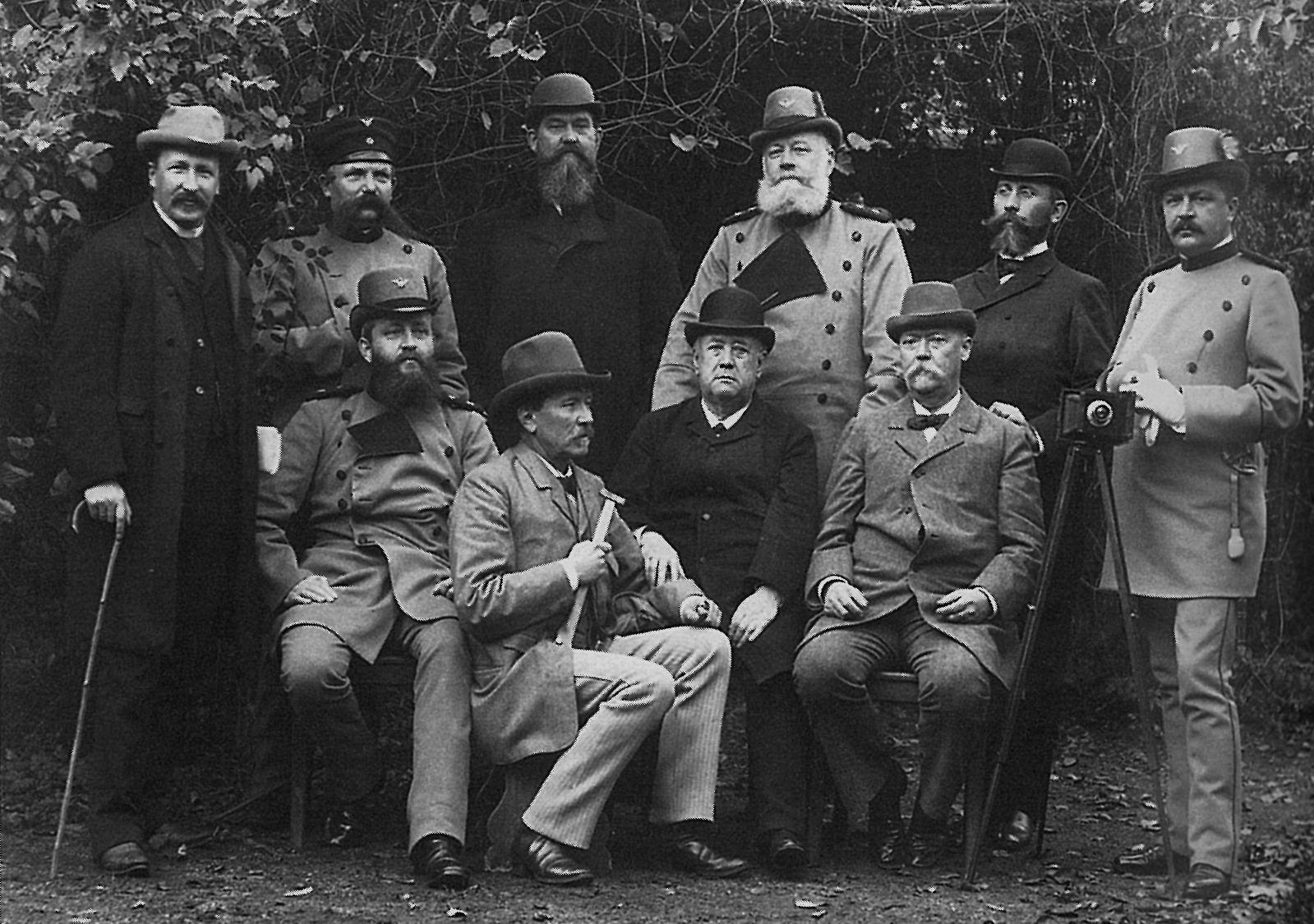
Altum, seated third from left, as part of an examination board under the ministry of agriculture and forests in Berlin, October 1893

From 1893 to 1900 he was president of the German Ornithologists' Society.

Ernst Mayr wrote about Altum's 1868 book Der Vogel und sein Leben which included notes on territoriality in birds in 1935. Mayr noted that many English ornithologists believed that concepts of territory had been established by Eliot Howard only in 1920. Altum noted defence of territory using song, the relationship of territory size to food availability and examined how competition or the lack of it between species decided territorial conflict or overlap between two species. Altum was a creationist, and when the book was printed, it was criticized by many including Alfred Brehm, with whom he particularly clashed. At a meeting of Berlin ornithologists on 6 April 1868, Brehm had commented that Altum's work was theological and teleological and was opposed to a modern understanding of zoology and that he was making birds and animals into (instinct-driven) machines by not crediting them with intelligence, thereby debasing the study of birds.

As an editor of the magazine Natur und Offenbarung ("Nature and Revelation"), Altum belonged to an initially small but growing group of Catholic popularizers of zoology in Germany.

== Works ==
- Homeri cum Aeschyli, Sophoclis, Euripidis comparantur, (dissertation), Berlin 1855.
- Winke zur Hebung des zoologischen Unterrichts (a zoology instruction manual), Münster 1863.
- Die Säugetiere des Münsterlands, Münster (Mammals of "Münster country"), 1867.
- Der Vogel und sein Leben, Münster 1868 (Birds and their lives); published in several editions, 7th edition 1903.
- Forstzoologie (Forest zoology; volume 1: mammals, volume 2: birds, volume 3: insects; general insects and beetles).
  - I. Säugethiere. Second improved and enlarged edition, published by Julius Springer, Berlin 1876.
  - II. Vögel. published by Julius Springer, Berlin 1873.
  - III. Insecten. 1. Abth. Allgemeines und Käfer. Second improved and enlarged edition, published by Julius Springer, Berlin 1881.
