= Paul Wilhelm Magnus =

German botanist and mycologist (1844–1914)

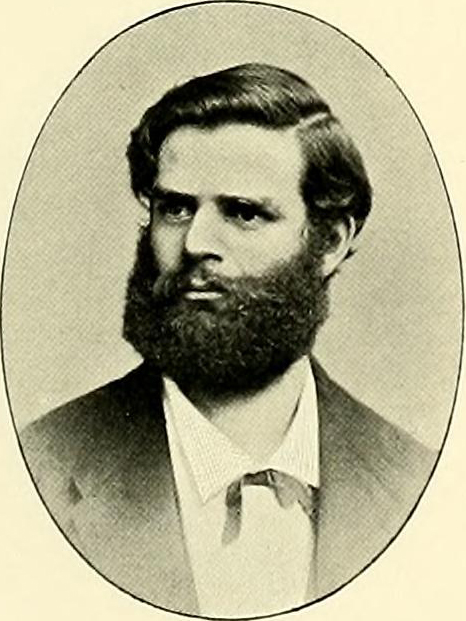
Paul Wilhelm Magnus

Paul Wilhelm Magnus (29 February 1844 – 13 March 1914) was a German botanist and mycologist.

Magnus was born in Berlin. He studied natural sciences at the Universities of Berlin and Freiburg. As a student of Alexander Braun at Berlin, he obtained his PhD in 1870 with a thesis on the aquatic plant genus Najas. In 1875, he became privat-docent at Berlin, where beginning in 1880, he served as an assistant professor of botany.

From 1871 to 1874, as a botanist aboard the vessel Pomerania, he conducted investigations of algae found in the North and Baltic Seas as well as in the Schlei estuary. In 1893 he was instrumental in the founding of the Biologische und Fischereistation Müggelsee (presently serving as a measuring station for the Leibniz-Institut für Gewässerökologie und Binnenfischerei). During his career, he analyzed material collected by other botanists, including specimens collected by Joseph Friedrich Nicolaus Bornmüller (Turkey and Syria), Georg Schweinfurth (Eritrea) and Rudolf Marloth (South Africa). He died in Berlin, aged 70.

Nearly half of his more than 600 works concerned mycological topics, and he is remembered for his investigations of the parasitic fungi families Ustilaginaceae and Uredinaceae. He was responsible for "Die Pilze (Fungi) von Tirol, Vorarlberg und Liechtenstein", an 810-page monograph on fungi that was Volume 3 of Dalla Torre and Sarnthein's series on the flora of Tyrol, Vorarlberg and Liechtenstein.

== Selected writings ==
- Erstes Verzeichniss der ihm aus dem Kanton Graubünden bekannt gewordenen Pilze, 1890.
- Unsere Kenntnis unterirdisch lebender streng parasitischer Pilze und die biologische Bedeutung eines solchen unterirdischen Parasitismus, 1892.
- Vierter Beitrag zur Pilzflora von Franken, 1906.
