= Stone Forest =

Formation of sharp limestone pillars created by calcium carbonate dissolution

Coordinates: 24°49′31″N 103°19′25″E

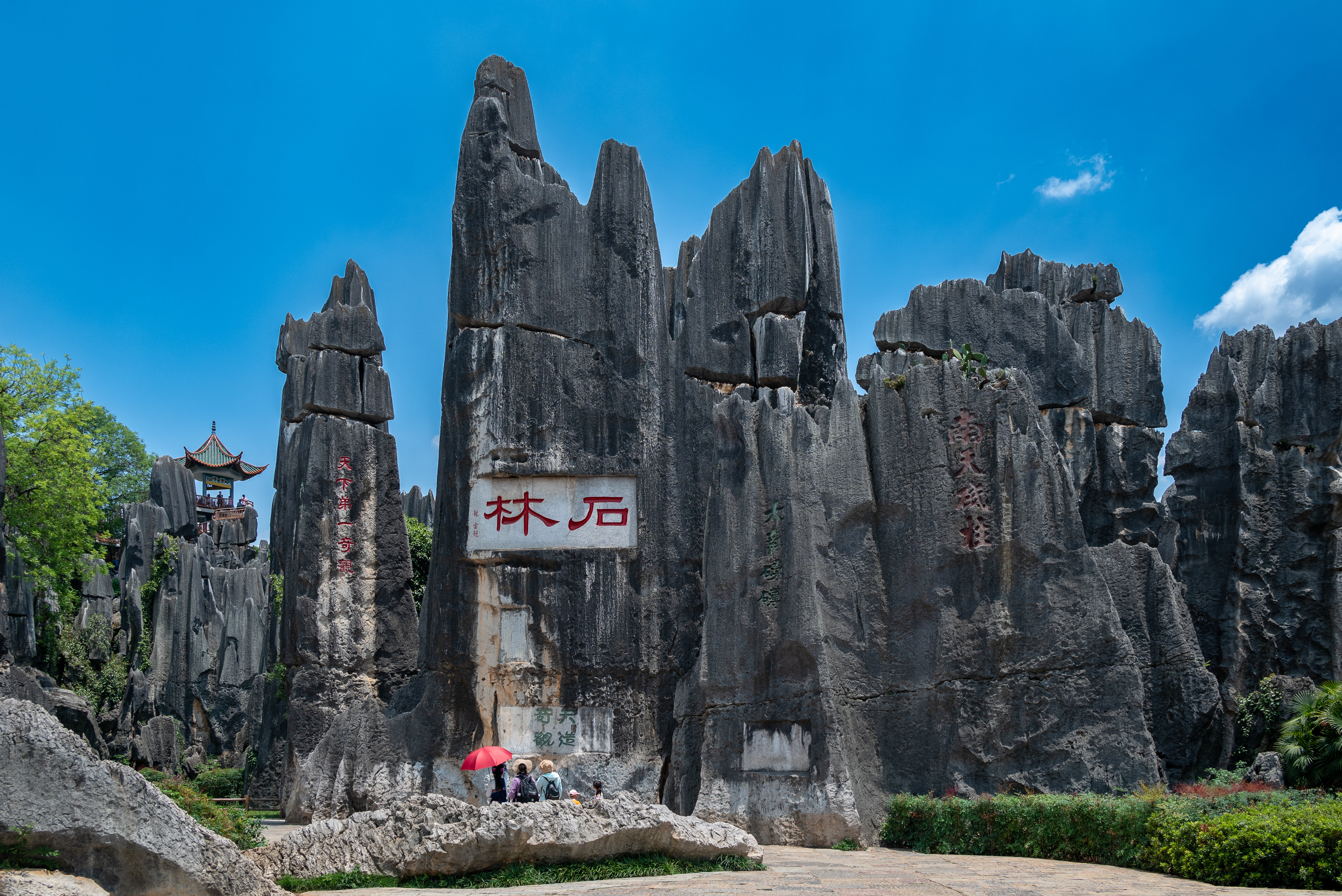
Main entrance to the Shilin Stone Forest

The Stone Forest or Shilin (Chinese: 石林; pinyin: Shílín) is a notable set of limestone formations about 500 km^{2} in area located in Shilin Yi Autonomous County, Yunnan, China. The forest is approximately 90 km (56 mi) east of the provincial capital Kunming.

The tall rocks appear to rise from the ground in a manner somewhat reminiscent of stalagmites, with many looking like petrified trees, thereby creating the illusion of a forest made of stone. Since 2007, two parts of the site, the Naigu Stone Forest (乃古石林) and Suogeyi Village (所各邑村), have been UNESCO World Heritage Sites as part of the South China Karst. The site is classified as a AAAAA-class tourist site.

== Features ==
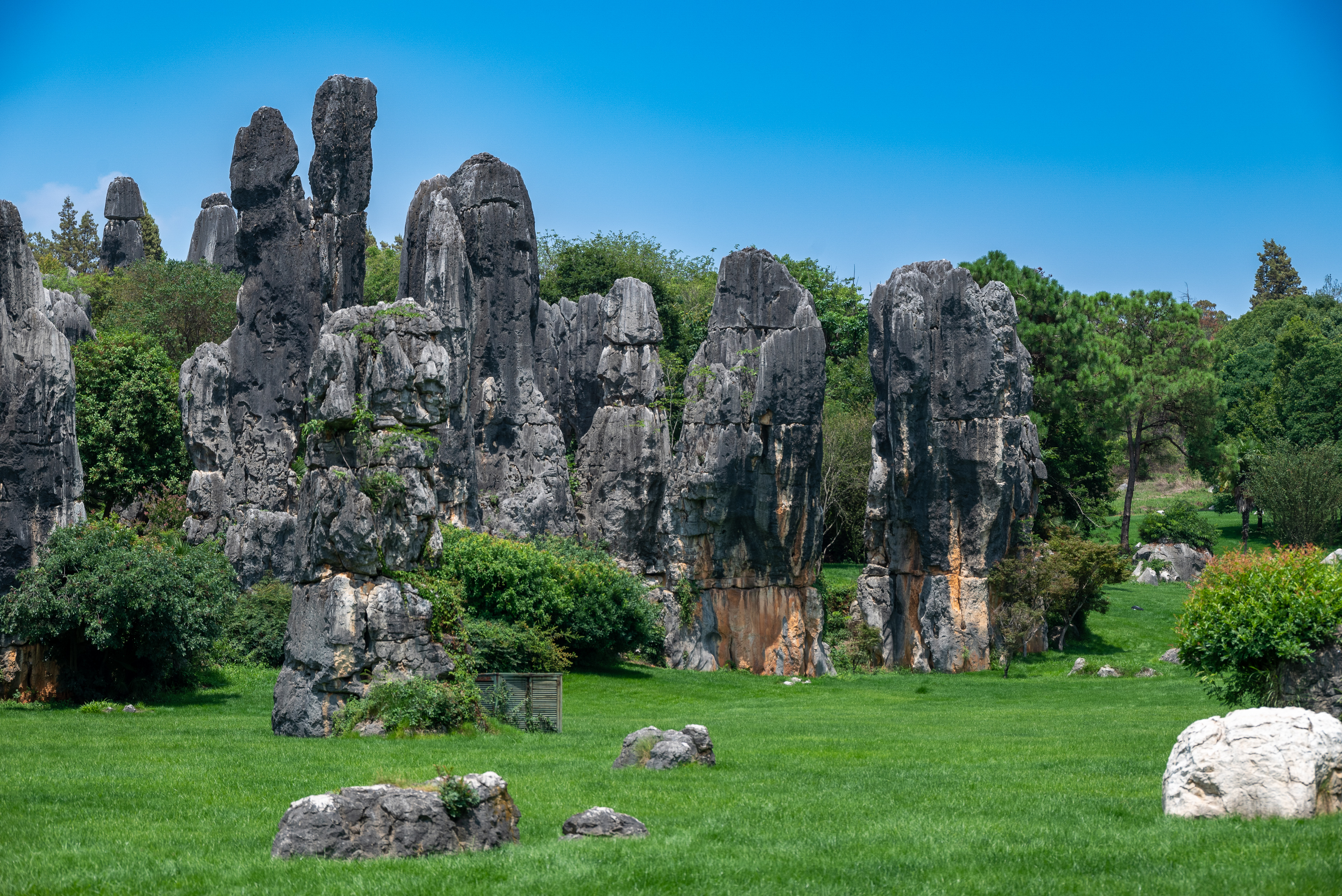
Shilin

Shilin National Scenic Area (昆明市石林风景区) covers an area of 400 km^{2} (150 sq mi) and is divided into seven scenic areas:

- Greater & Lesser Stone Forests (大小石林), also known as the Lizijing Stone Forest (李子菁石林)
- Naigu Stone Forest (乃古石林)
- Zhiyun Cave (芝云洞)
- Lake Chang (长湖 literally Long Lake)
- Lake Yue (月湖 literally Moon Lake)
- Dadieshui Waterfall (大叠水瀑布)
- Qifeng Cave (奇峰洞)

These formations, caused by the weathering of limestone, are believed to be over 270 million years old and are a tourist attraction for both overseas and domestic tourists, with bus tours bringing tourists from Kunming. There are also a number of hotels in the area.

== Geology ==
The Stone Forest area was a shallow sea some 270 million years ago. Extensive deposits of sandstone overlain by limestone accumulated in this basin during the Permian period of geologic time. Uplift of this region occurred subsequent to deposition. Later, exposure to wind and running water shaped these limestone pillars. These formations extend as far as the eye can see, looking like a vast forest of stone, hence the name "The Stone Forest". The Major and Minor Stone Forest are developed in the nearly pure limestone of the Permian Makou Formation. The Naigu Stone Forest, 9 km northeast of the Major Stone Forest, is developed in dolomite and dolomitic limestone of the Permian Qixia Formation. Both formations are of Lower Permian age. They aggregate 505 m in thickness and consist of shallow water (platform) massive limestone and dolomite, bio-clastic limestone, calcarenite and calcilutite. The Maokou Formation at Stone Forest appears to have been heavily altered diagenetically, and macroscopic fossil remains are seldom seen. Under the microscope, single whole or fractured fusulinid foraminifera are seen, commonly in biomicrite, biopelmicrite to biopelmicrosparite limestones. At least one zone of chert nodules occurs in the limestone. Unlike in the dolomitic Qixia Formation, dolomite in the Maokou Formation seldom ranges above 3%.

The strata are part of a gentle (2-6 degree) westward dipping monocline. Conjugate shear joints (NE-SW and NE-SE) are well developed and these fractures provided the main passageways for surface and underground water in the pre-karst development stage. The distribution, density and orientation of the fractures controlled the depth, size and orientation of the karst topography. Sandstones and shales of the Liangshan Formation that lies below the carbonate rock formations serve as a permeability barrier and force the local groundwater to flow from west to east.

== Flora ==
The Shilin Karst area has the following types of forests and plant communities.

- Evergreen broad-leaved forest: Cyclobanopsis glancoides, Cyclobalanopsis delavayi, and Castanopsis delavayi
- Sclerophyllous evergreen broad-leaved forests: Quercus cocciferoides and Quercus franchetii
- Deciduous broad-leaved and subtropical needle-leaved forests: Pinus yunnanensis
- Lake vegetation: Ottelia acuminata

=== Other plant species ===
- Sino-Himalayan subregion species: Colquhounia, Corallodiscus, Docynia, Lysiontus, Physospermopsis, Prinsepia, Sinocrassula, Siphonostegia
- Sino-Japan forest subrealm species: Akebia, Conandron, Sinomenium, Platycladus
- East Asian Realm species: Ainsliaea, Bletilla, Codonopsis, Dendrobenthamia, Eriobotrya, Leptodermis, Lycoris, Ophiopogon, Patrinia, Reineckea

== Culture ==
According to legend, the forest is the birthplace of Ashima (simplified Chinese: 阿诗玛; traditional Chinese: 阿詩瑪), a beautiful girl of the Yi people. After falling in love she was forbidden to marry her chosen suitor and instead turned into a stone in the forest that still bears her name. Each year on the 24th day of the sixth lunar month, many Yi people celebrate the Torch Festival (simplified Chinese: 火把节; traditional Chinese: 火把節; pinyin: Huǒbă Jié), which features folk dances and wrestling competitions.

== Gallery ==
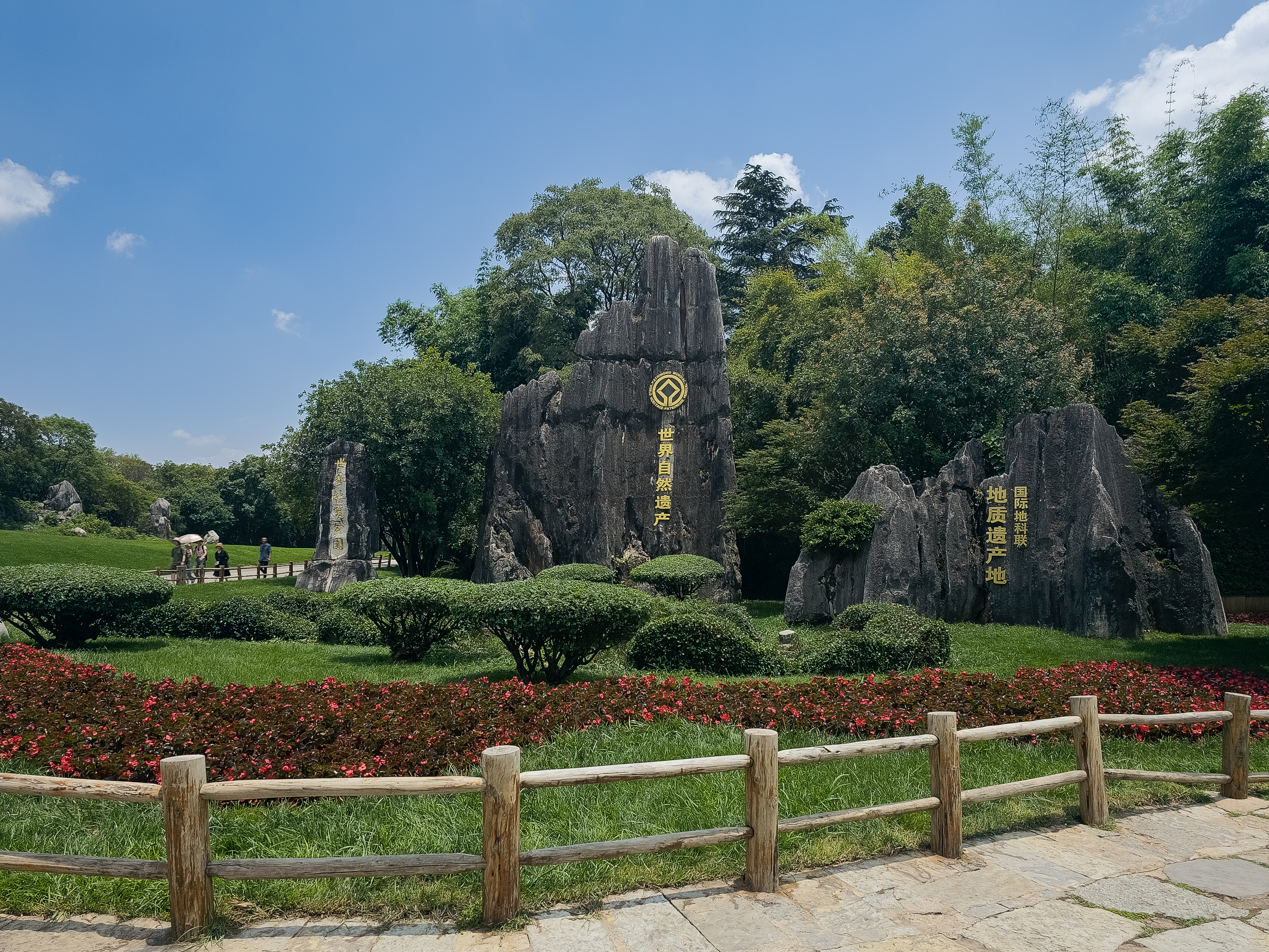

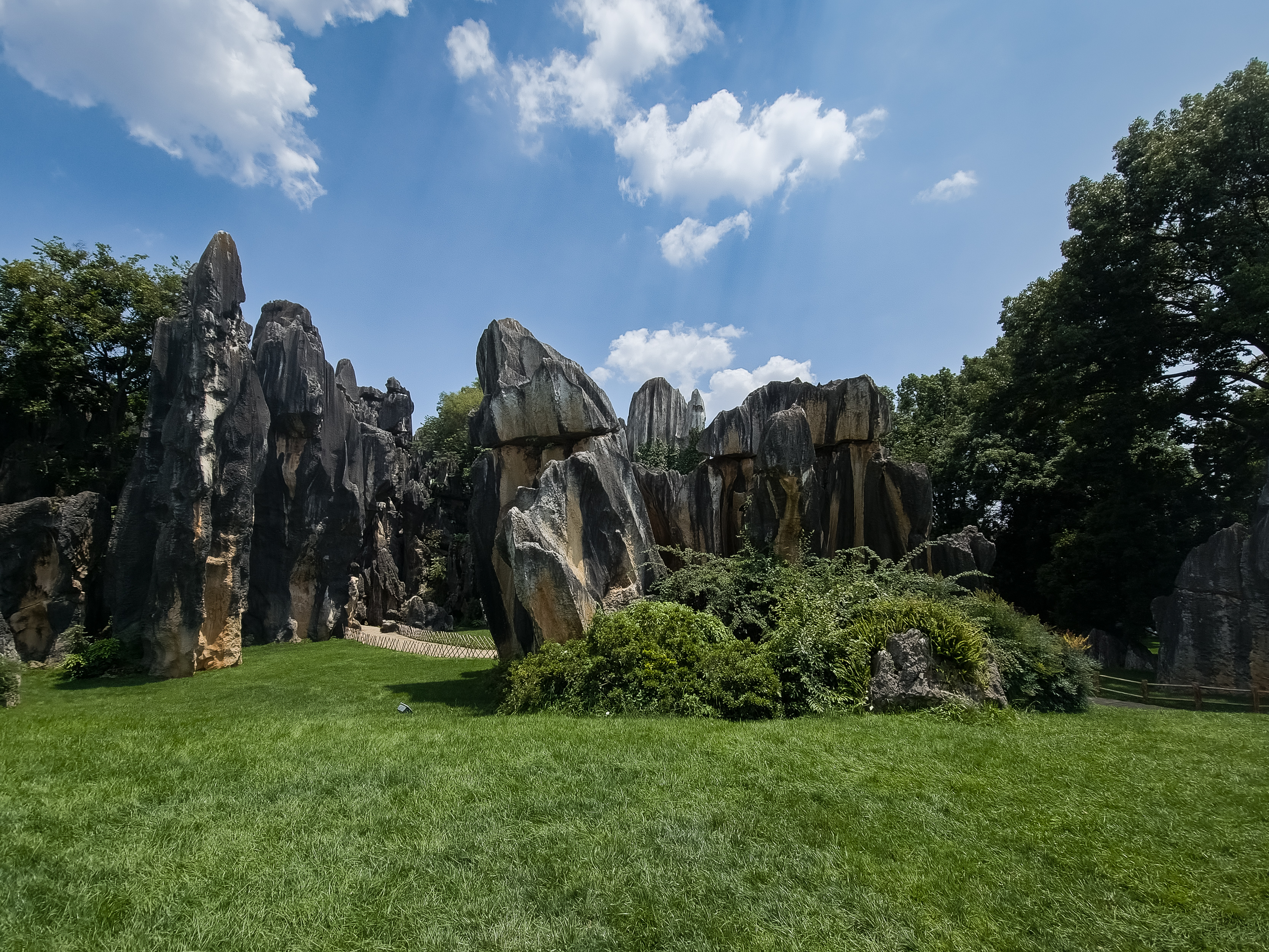

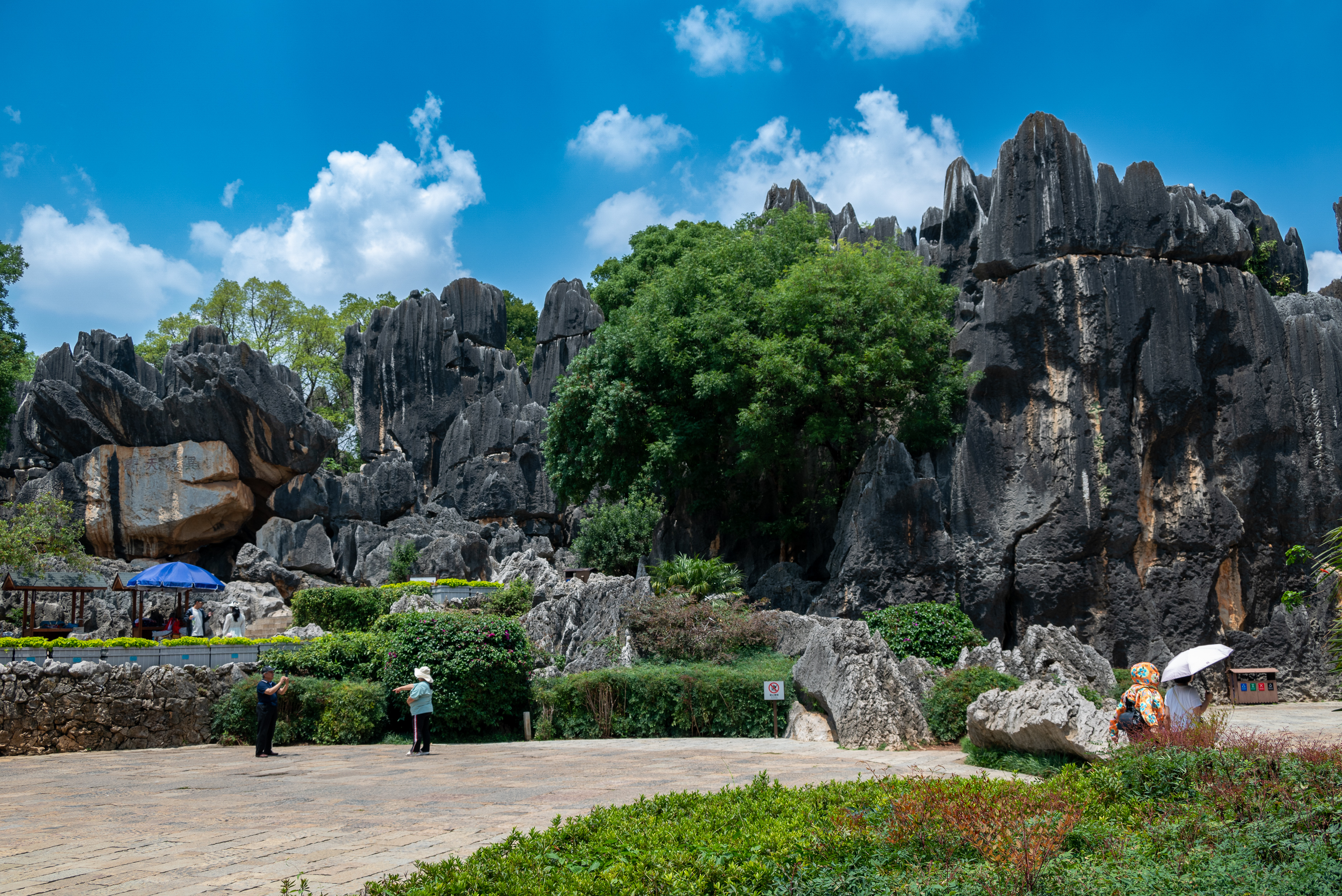

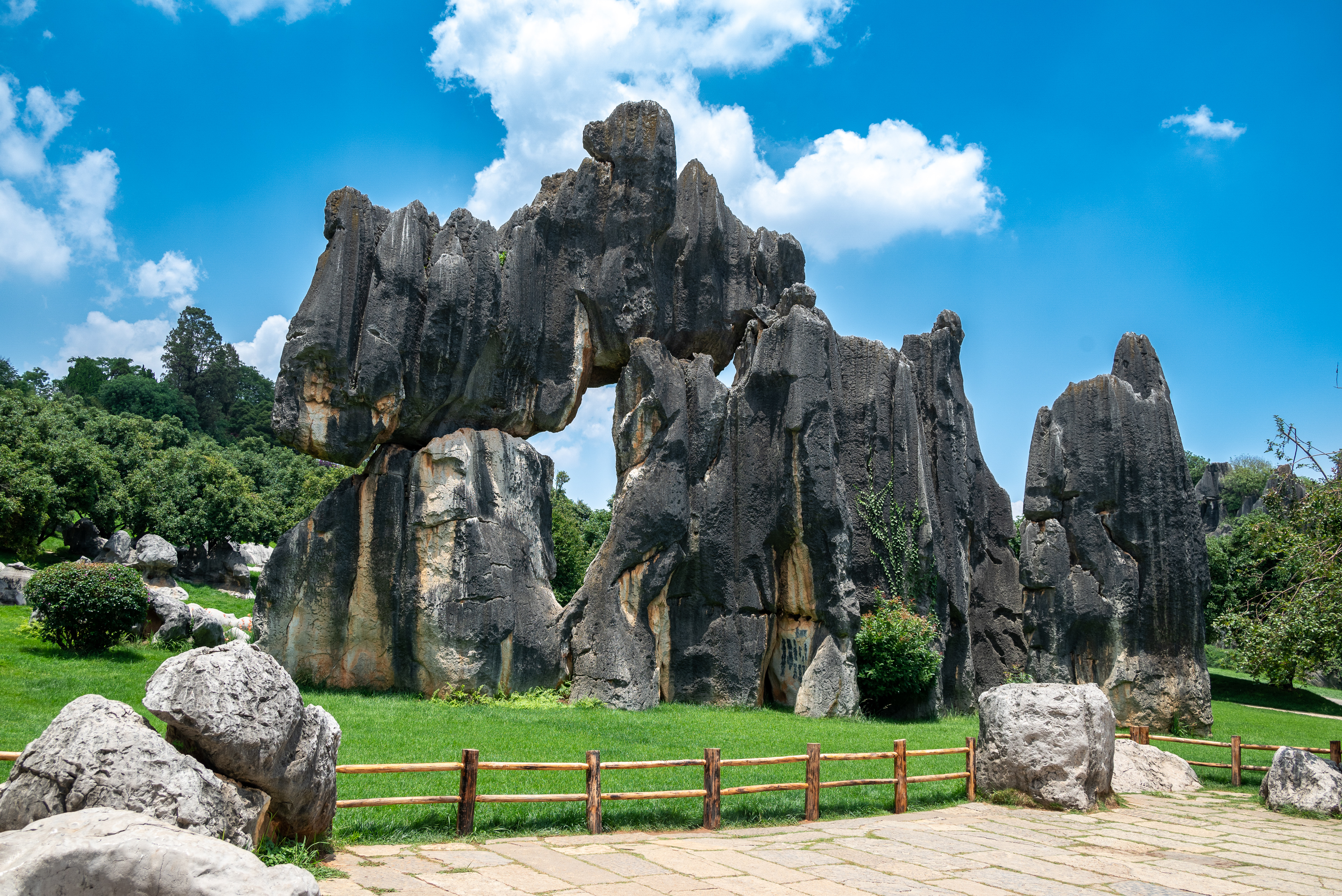

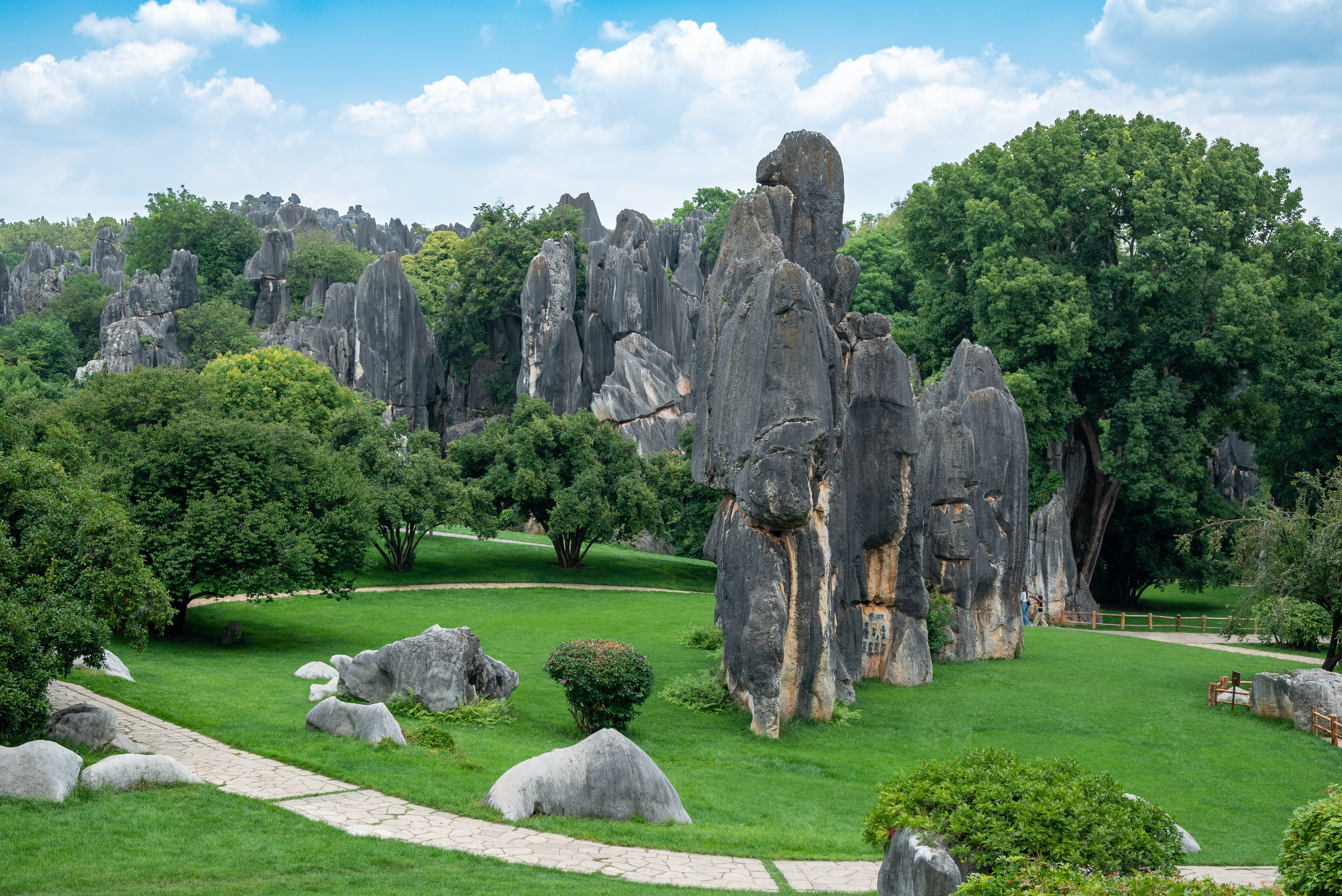

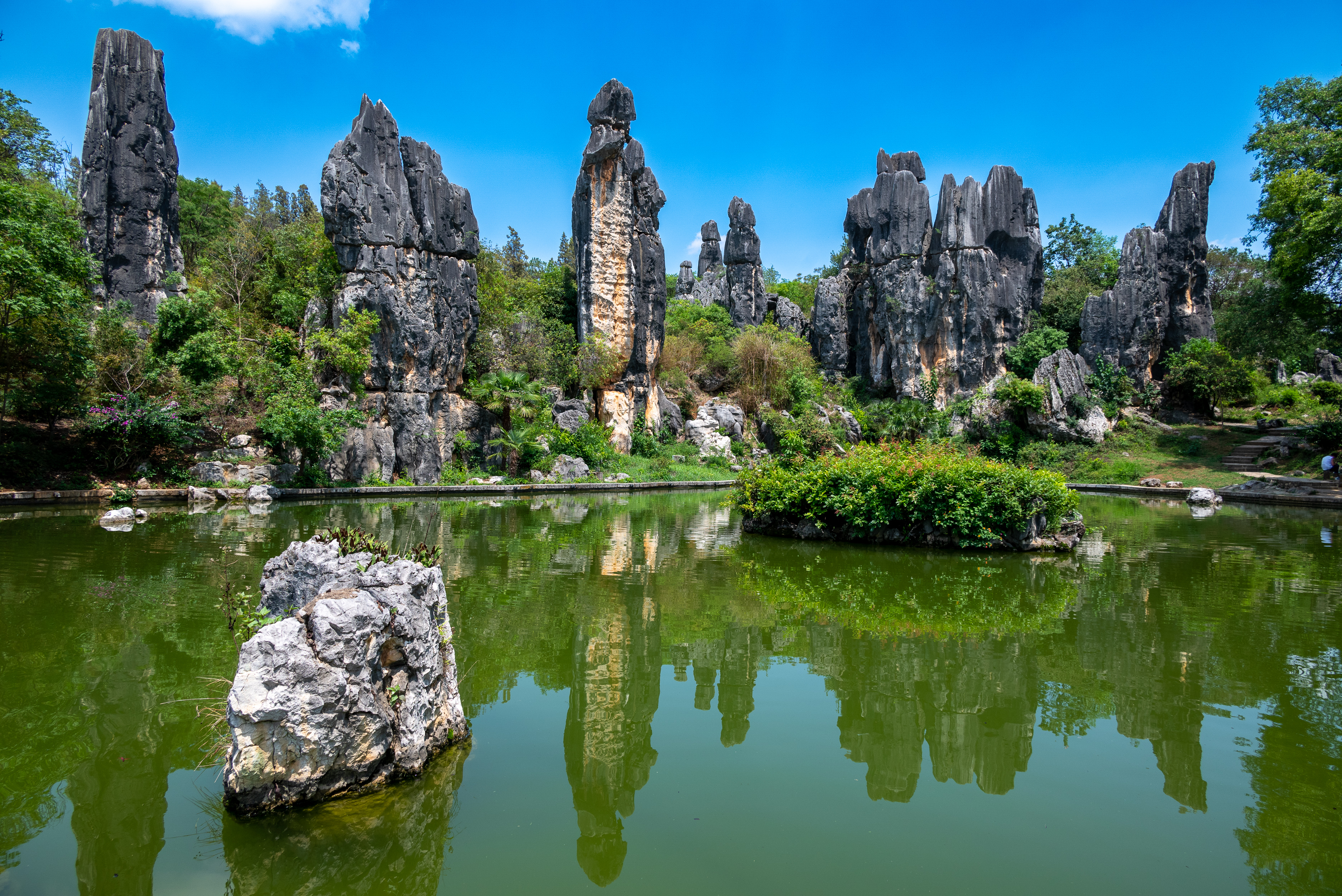

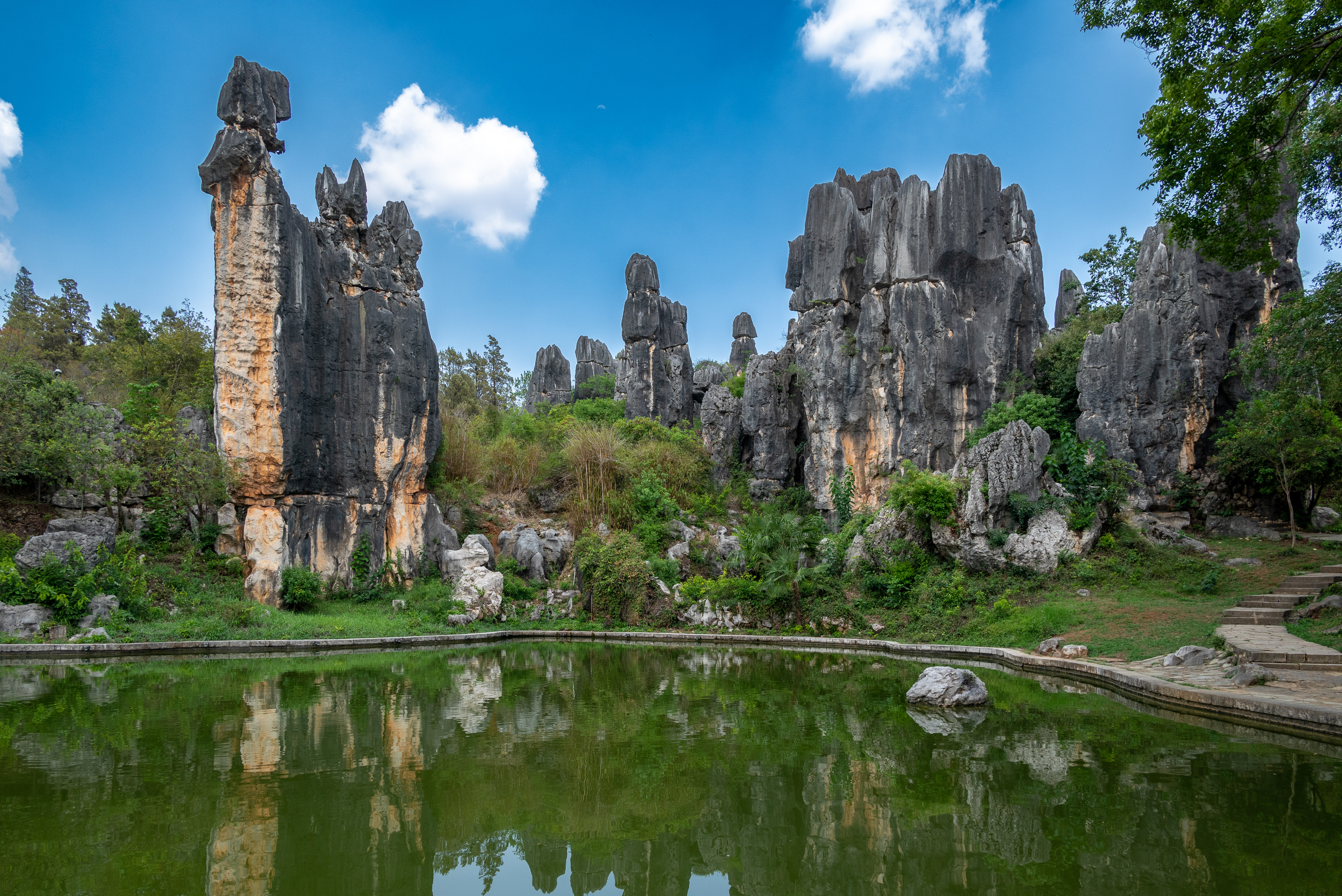

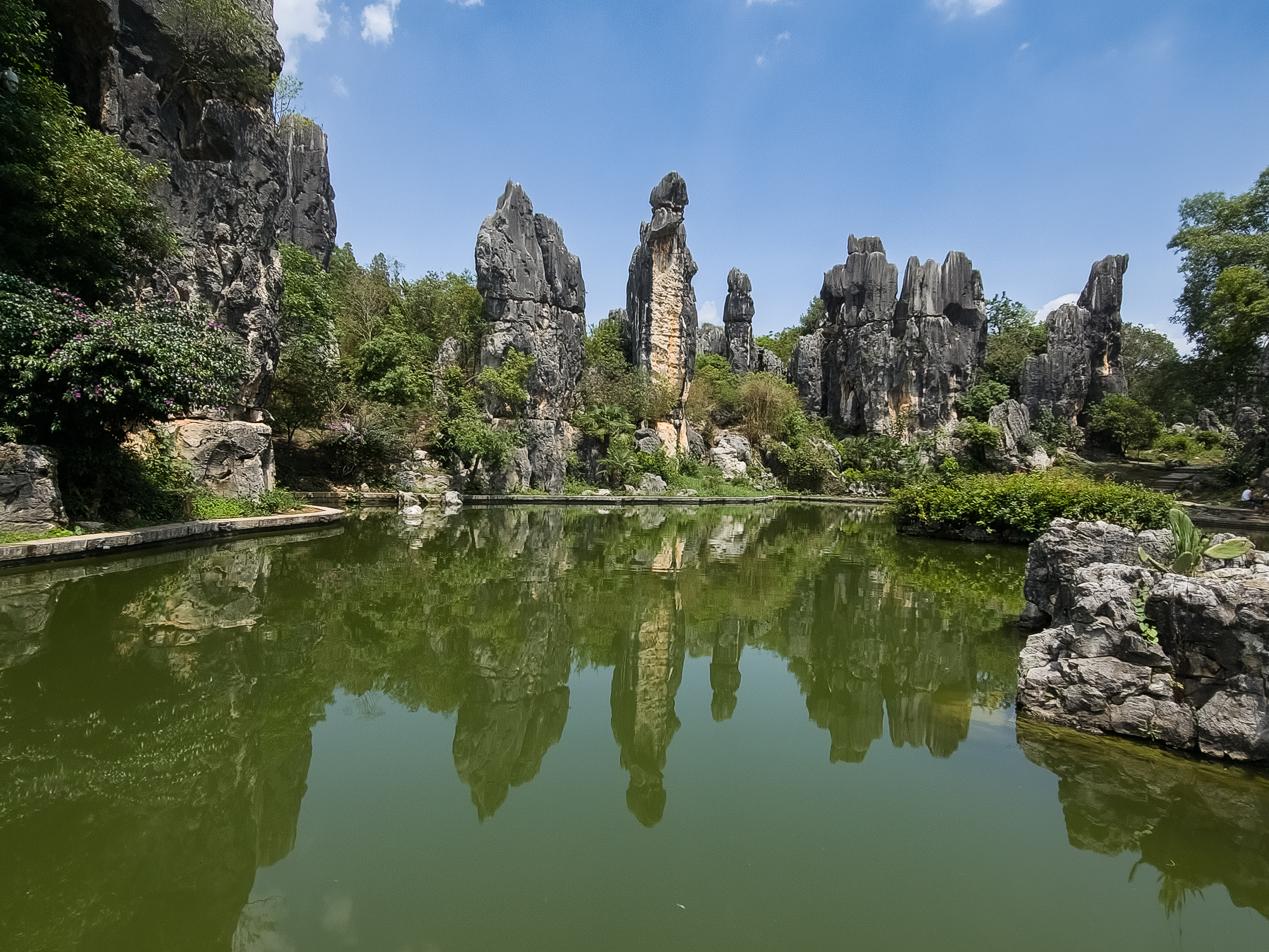

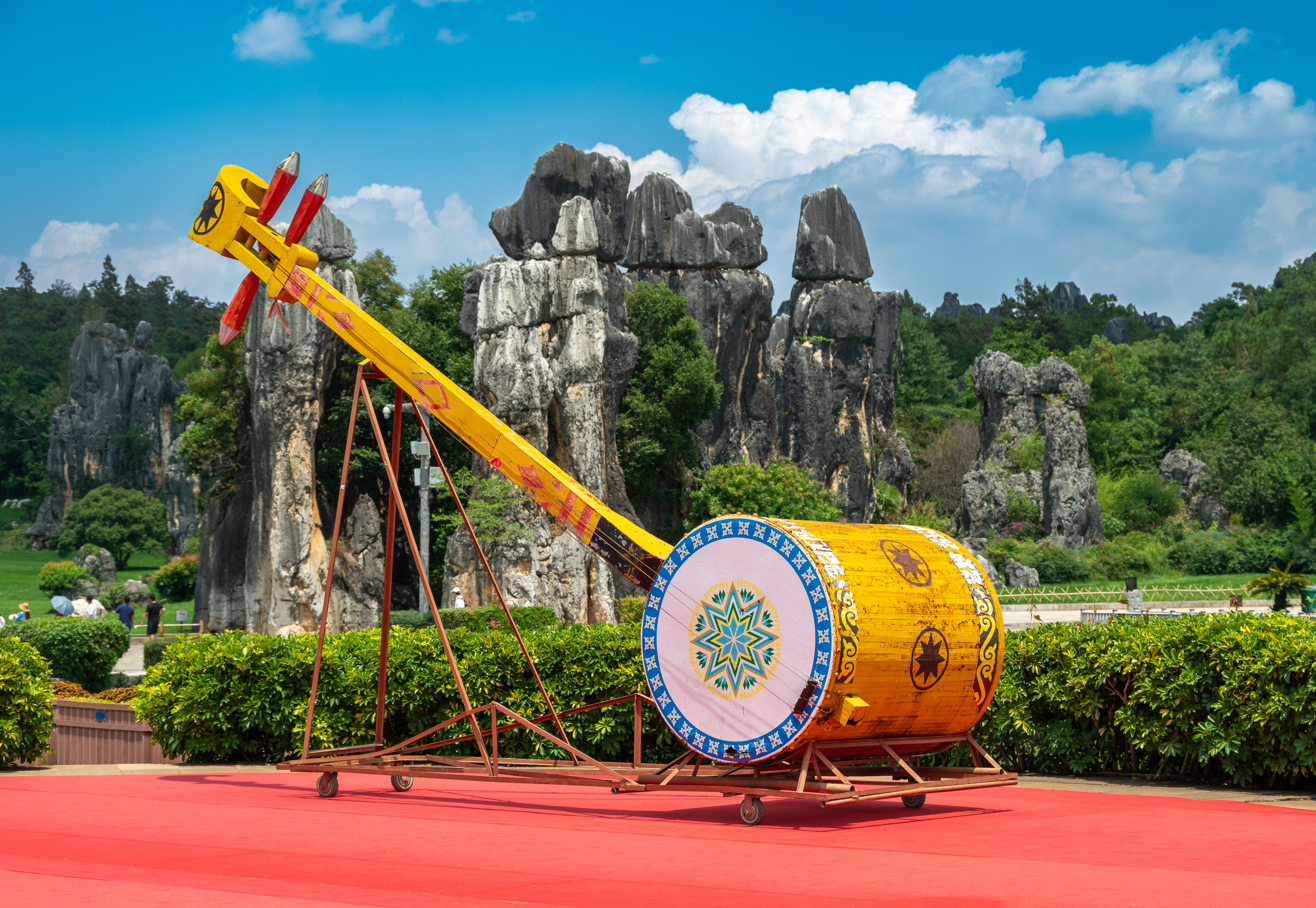

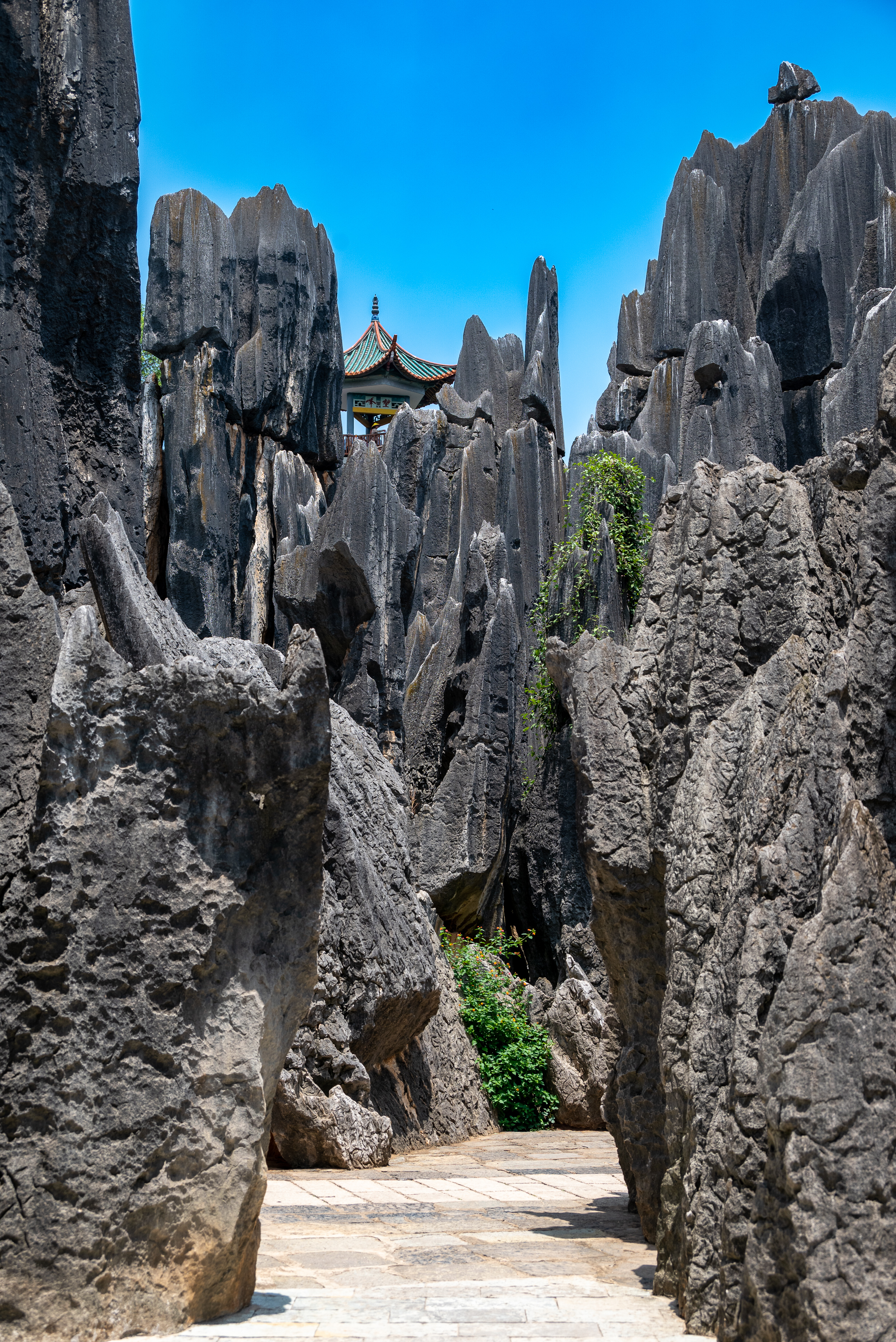

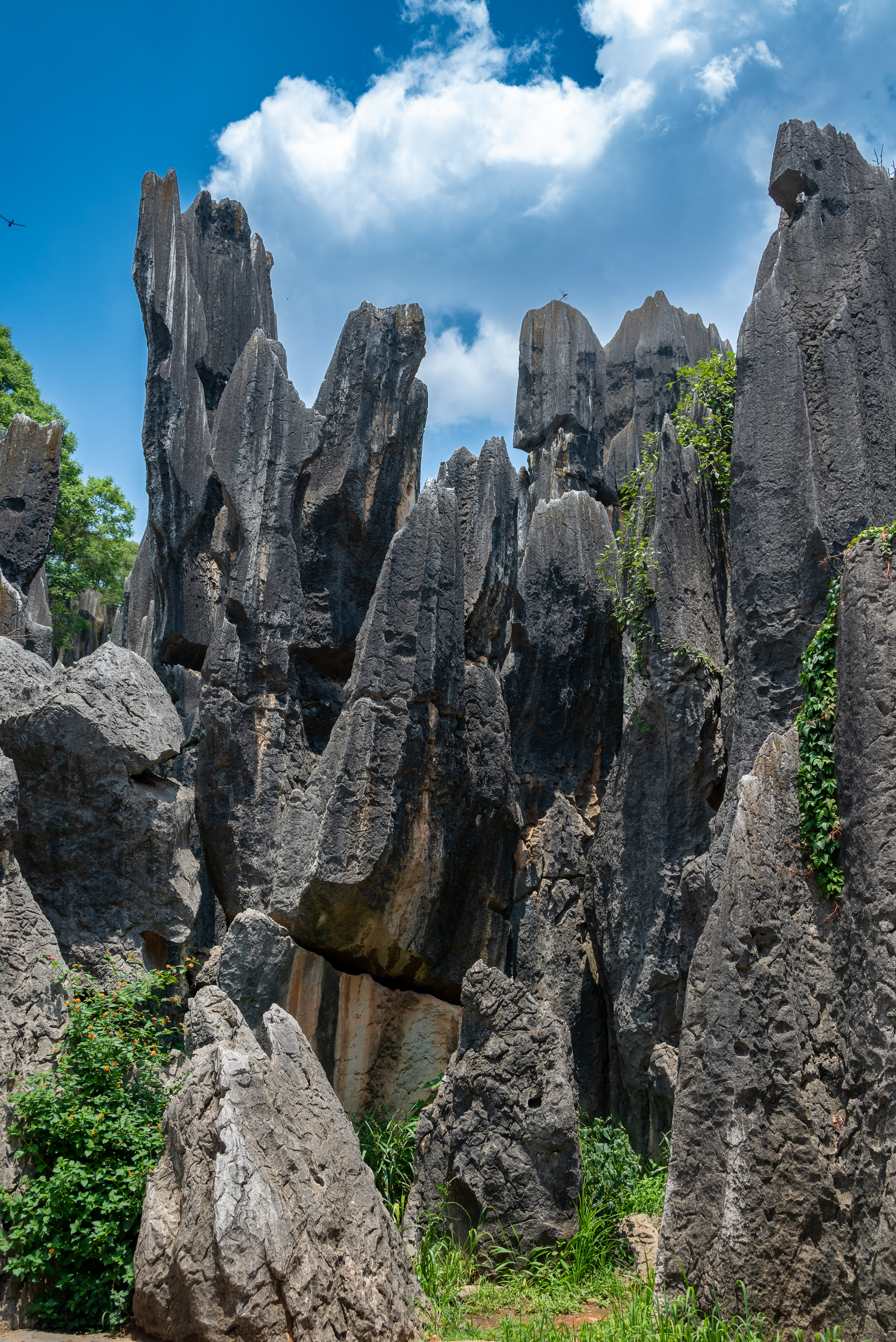

== See also ==
- Karst
- Pobiti Kamani
- Penitente (snow formation)
- South China Karst
- Tsingy de Bemaraha National Park (Madagascar)
- Tsingy de Bemaraha Strict Nature Reserve (Madagascar)
- Tulin (geology)
- Xingwen County
