= F700 =

F700 may refers to:

- Compaq Presario F700, a notebook computer
- Mercedes-Benz F700, a concept car
- Samsung SGH-F700, a mobile phone
- Chery Jetour Zongheng F700
