= Swamp lily =

Swamp lily can refer to plants:

- Some species of Crinum, including:
  - Crinum americanum, Florida swamp-lily
  - Crinum erubescens
  - Crinum pedunculatum
- Lilium superbum
- Ottelia ovalifolia
- Zephyranthes candida, Peruvian swamp lily
