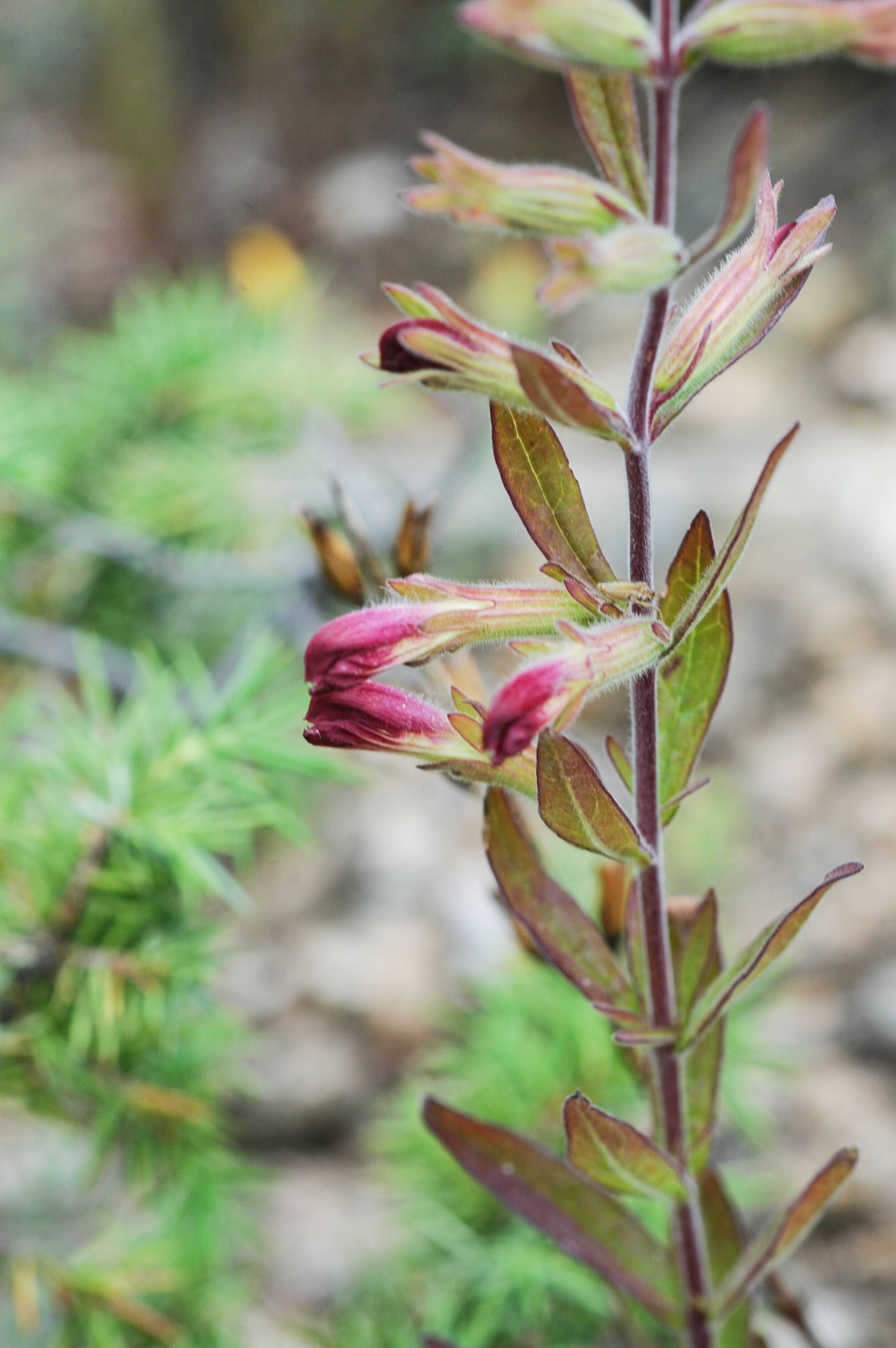

Scientific classification
- Kingdom: Plantae
- Clade: Tracheophytes
- Clade: Angiosperms
- Clade: Eudicots
- Clade: Asterids
- Order: Lamiales
- Family: Orobanchaceae
- Genus: Siphonostegia
- Species: S. syriaca

Binomial name
- Siphonostegia syriaca (Boiss. & Reut.) Boiss.

Synonyms
- Lesquereuxia syriaca Boiss. & Reut.

= Siphonostegia syriaca =

Species of flowering plant

Siphonostegia syriaca, synonym Lesquereuxia syriaca, is a species of flowering plants. It is a hemiparasitic perennial plant, feeding on the roots of other plants using haustoria.

== Taxonomy ==
The species was first described as Lesquereuxia syriaca in 1853 by the Swiss botanist Pierre Edmond Boissier and the French botanist Georges François Reuter, who named it after the Swiss bryologist and paleobotanist, Charles Léo Lesquereux (1806–1889). When placed in the genus Lesquereuxia, it was the only species.

== Distribution ==
It is found in the eastern Mediterranean region, ranging from Greece through southern Turkey to Lebanon and Syria.
