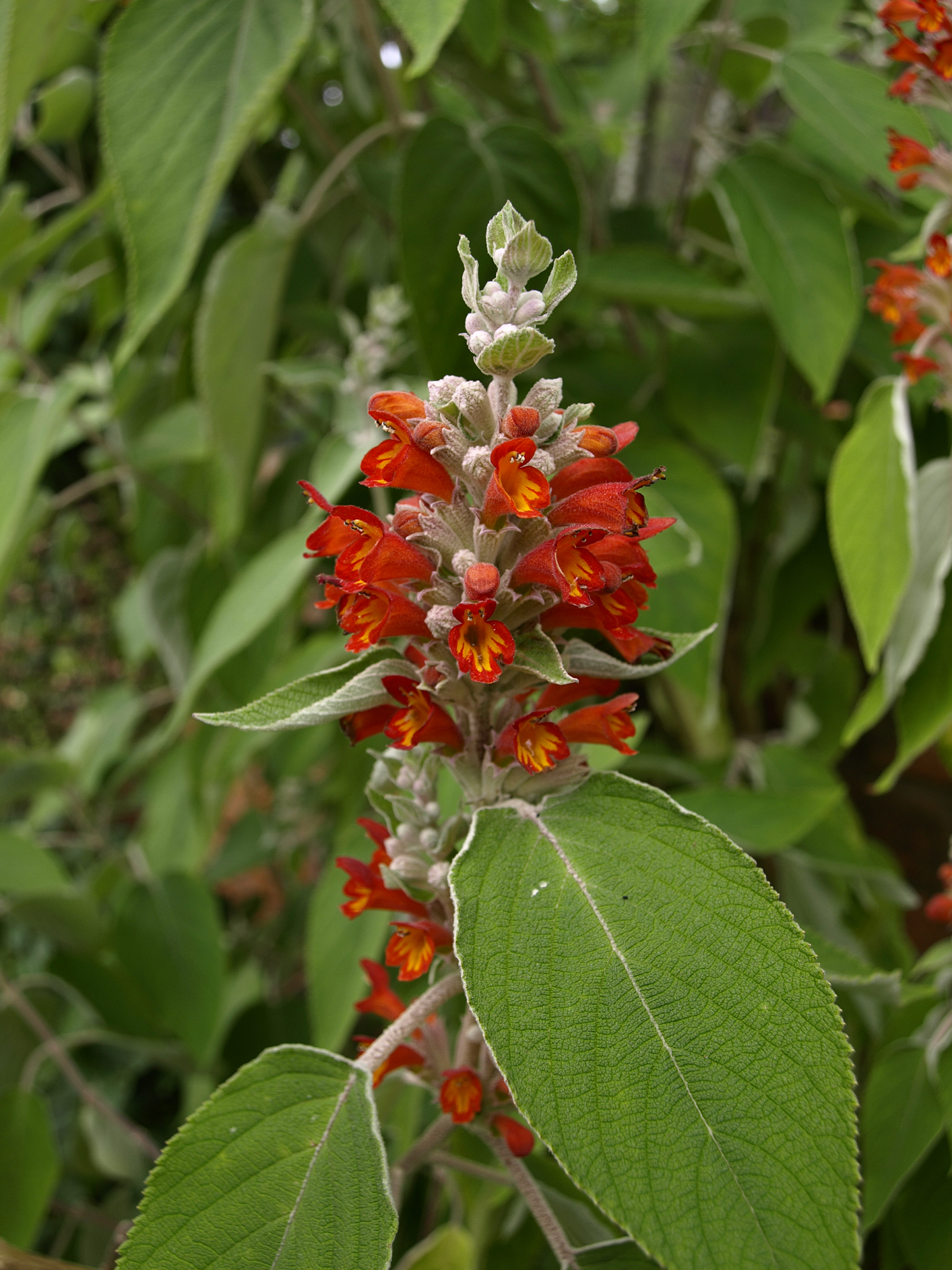

Scientific classification
- Kingdom: Plantae
- Clade: Tracheophytes
- Clade: Angiosperms
- Clade: Eudicots
- Clade: Asterids
- Order: Lamiales
- Family: Lamiaceae
- Genus: Colquhounia
- Species: C. coccinea

Binomial name
- Colquhounia coccinea Wall.

= Colquhounia coccinea =

Species of flowering plant

Colquhounia coccinea is a species of flowering plant in the mint family Lamiaceae. It is commonly known as scarlet-flowered colquhounia or Himalayan mint shrub. It is native to China, Bhutan, Nepal, Myanmar, India and Thailand. It is an evergreen or semi-evergreen shrub growing to 2.5 m (8.2 ft) tall and broad, with aromatic leaves which are felted underneath (tomentose). Spikes of red or deep orange flowers, with yellow interiors, appear in late summer. Its native habitats include slopes, stony grassy hillsides, thickets, and river valleys.

It is not entirely hardy (RHS H4), and requires a sheltered position in full sun, with protection from winter wet.

The Latin specific epithet coccinea refers to the red colour of the flowers.

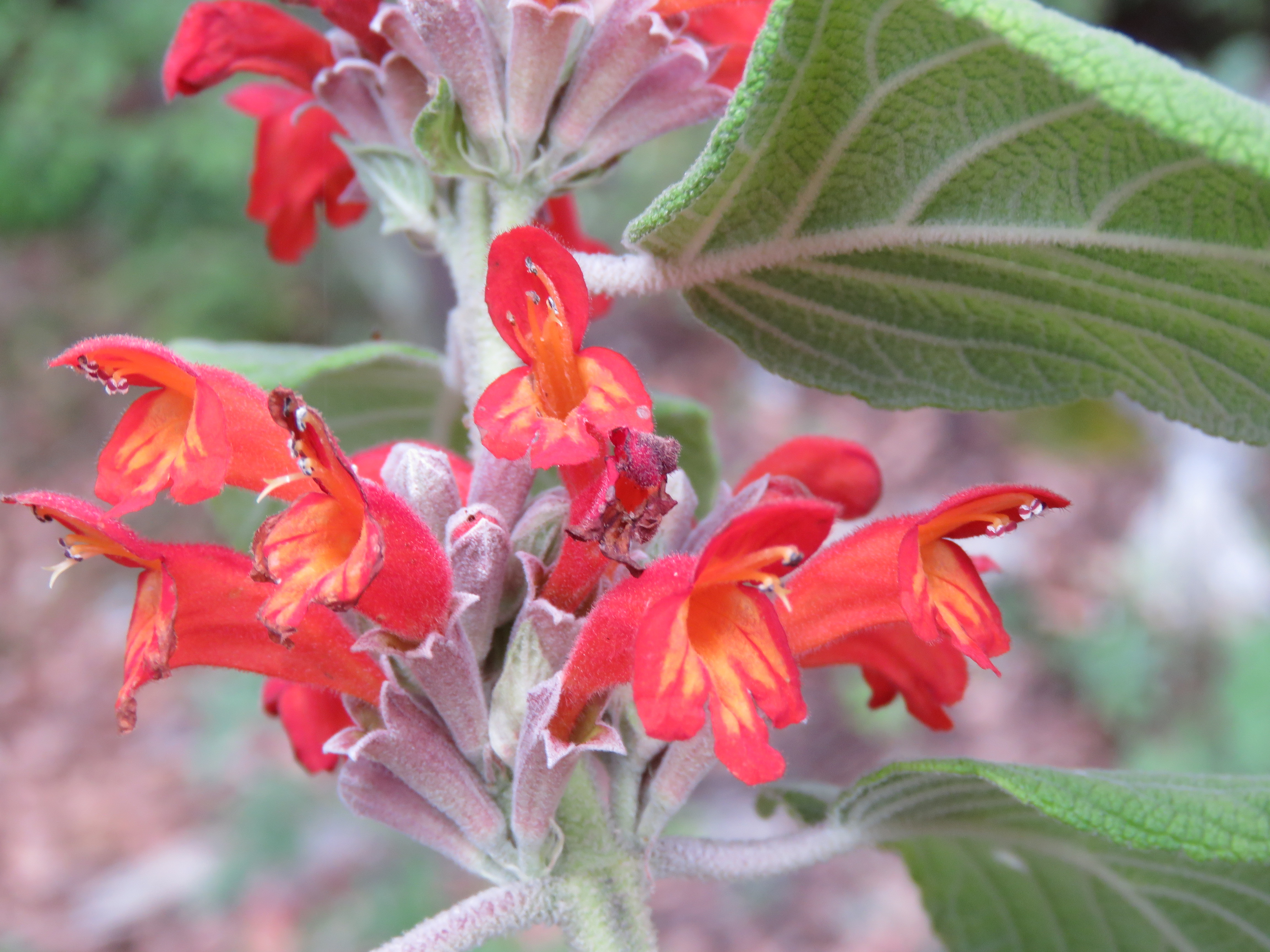
