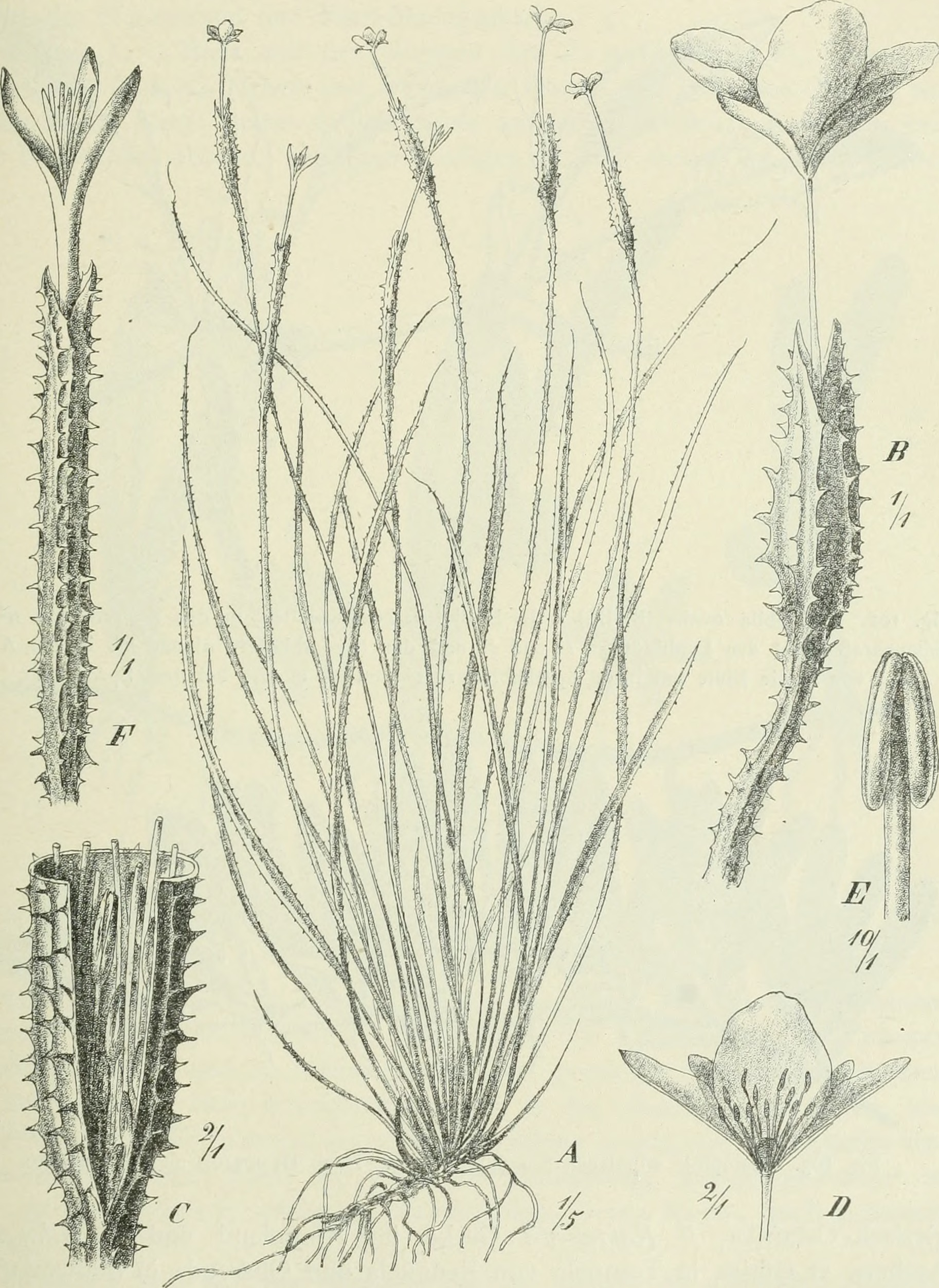

Conservation status
- Least Concern (IUCN 3.1)

Scientific classification
- Kingdom: Plantae
- Clade: Tracheophytes
- Clade: Angiosperms
- Clade: Monocots
- Order: Alismatales
- Family: Hydrocharitaceae
- Genus: Ottelia
- Species: O. muricata

Binomial name
- Ottelia muricata (C.H.Wright) Dandy

Synonyms
- Boottia muricata C.H.Wright

= Ottelia muricata =

Species of flowering plant

Ottelia muricata is a species of aquatic plant native to central and southern Africa.
