= Colquhounia elegans =

Scientific classification
- Kingdom: Plantae
- Clade: Tracheophytes
- Clade: Angiosperms
- Clade: Eudicots
- Clade: Asterids
- Order: Lamiales
- Family: Lamiaceae
- Genus: Colquhounia
- Species: C. elegans

Binomial name
- Colquhounia elegans Wallich ex Bentham

Synonyms
- Colquhounia martabanica Kurz ex Prain; Colquhounia tenuiflora Hook.f.; Stachys siamensis Muschl.

Species of flowering plant

Colquhounia elegans (秀丽火把花; xiùlì huǒbǎ huā) is a shrub species in the genus Colquhounia found in Asia (Yunnan, Cambodia, Laos, Myanmar, Thailand, Vietnam).

Varieties

1. Colquhounia elegans var. elegans - Yunnan, Cambodia, Laos, Myanmar, Thailand, Vietnam
2. Colquhounia elegans var. tenuiflora (Hook.f.) Prain - Yunnan, Cambodia, Laos, Myanmar, Thailand, Vietnam
