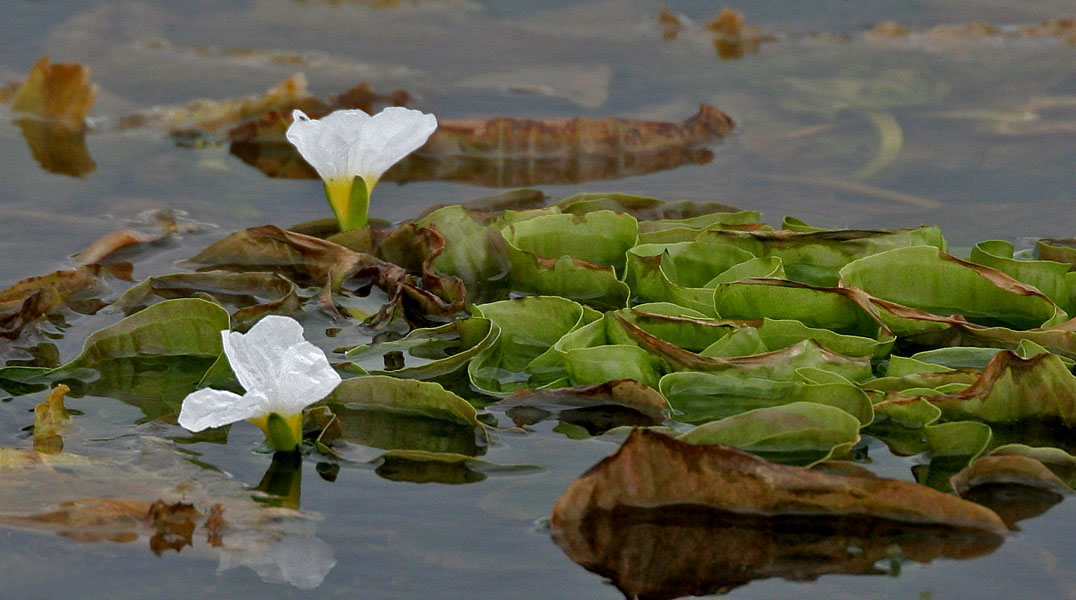
- Ottelia alismoides

Scientific classification
- Kingdom: Plantae
- Clade: Tracheophytes
- Clade: Angiosperms
- Clade: Monocots
- Order: Alismatales
- Family: Hydrocharitaceae
- Subfamily: Anacharioideae
- Genus: Ottelia; Pers. 1805 not R.Hedw. 1806

Synonyms
- Damasonium Schreb. 1789, illegitimate homonym, not Mill. 1754 (Hydrocharitaceae) nor Adans. 1789 (syn of Limnocharis in Alismataceae); Hymenotheca Salisb.; Boottia Wall.; Oligolobos Gagnep.; Xystrolobos Gagnep.; Beneditaea Toledo

= Ottelia =

Genus of flowering plants

Ottelia is a genus of an aquatic plant family Hydrocharitaceae described as a genus in 1805. The genus is native to tropical and subtropical regions of Africa, Asia, South America, and Australia.

== Description ==
The genus is highly variable, with a variety of features. It contains aquatic herbs with crowded leaves. Some of the leaves are held on short stems. Others float on long stems. The rooting stem is long.

The flowers are held in a herbaceous bract that is many nerved and has two to six clear ribs. The tubular spathe is shortly divided into two.

Each flower has two rows of a trimerous perianth held above the beak of the ovary. The rigid outer layer is oblong or linear. The larger inner layer is petal-like with a fleshy appendage at the base. There are six or more stamens, often with flattened filaments. The ovary is oblong and beaked with strongly developed placentas dividing it into six chambers that contain many ovules. There are six linear styles that are partially split in two.

The tapering oblong fruits are included in the floral bract and have three to six wings. They contain numerous small, oblong seeds.

It has been suggested that this genus should be divided into two subgenera and four sections:

- Subgenus Ottelia has bisexual flowers.
  - Section Ottelia: The spathes have a single flower and six to nine carpels in the ovary.
  - Section Oligolobos: The spathes have many flowers and an ovary with three carpels.
- Subgenus Boottia has unisexual flowers. The male spathes have one to many flowers while the female spathes always have many flowers.
  - Section Boottia: The males spathes have one flower and the ovaries of the female flowers have nine to fifteen carpels.
  - Section Xystrolobos: The female spathes have two to many flowers and an ovary with three or nine carpels.

== Distribution ==
This genus is found throughout the Paleotropics, from Africa to Asia to Australia and New Caledonia and to Brazil. The areas with the highest diversity occur in central Africa (about 13 species) and south east Asia (about 8 species). They are mostly found growing in lakes, slow flowing creeks and rivers.

== Phylogenomics and evolution ==
Originating in the mid Miocene, this genus now consists of two major clades that correspond to the two major centers of diversity - Africa and Asia. Morphological evidence suggests that this genus originated in Africa. It then spread to South America and Australasia via the ocean, and then from Australasia to Asia.

Global cooling, the development of the East Asian monsoon climate and tectonic movement likely aided diversification in China. The movement of the Yunnan-Guizhou Plateau Pin the liocenehas been suggested to explain the high endemism of Chinese species of Ottelia.

== Species ==
This genus is the second largest in its family (Hydrocharitaceae). The following species are accepted:

1. Ottelia acuminata (Gagnep.) Dandy - S China
2. Ottelia alismoides (L.) Pers. - Khabarovsk, Primorye, China, Indian Subcontinent, SE Asia, New Guinea, Solomon Is, N Australia
3. Ottelia balansae (Gagnep.) Dandy - S China, Vietnam
4. Ottelia brachyphylla (Gürke) Dandy - Sudan
5. Ottelia brasiliensis (Planch.) Walp. - Brazil, Paraguay, NE Argentina
6. Ottelia cordata (Wall.) Dandy - Hainan, Thailand, Myanmar, Cambodia
7. Ottelia cylindrica (T.C.E.Fr.) Dandy - Zaïre, Zambia, Angola
8. Ottelia emersa Z.C.Zhao & R.L.Luo - Guangxi
9. Ottelia exserta (Ridl.) Dandy - from Somalia to Cape Province
10. Ottelia fengshanensis Z.Z.Li, S.Wu & Q.F.Wang - from southeast China
11. Ottelia fischeri (Gürke) Dandy - from Kenya to Mozambique
12. Ottelia guanyangensis Z.Z.Li, Q.F.Wang & S.Wu - from Southeast China
13. Ottelia kunenensis (Gürke) Dandy - Zambia, Angola, Botswana, Namibia
14. Ottelia lisowskii Symoens - Zaïre, Zambia
15. Ottelia mesenterium (Hallier f.) Hartog - Sulawesi
16. Ottelia muricata (C.H.Wright) Dandy - C + S Africa
17. Ottelia obtusifolia T.C.E.Fr. - from Zambia and Zaïre
18. Ottelia ovalifolia (R.Br.) Rich. - Australia
19. Ottelia profundecordata Symoens - from the Central African Republic and Zaïre
20. Ottelia scabra Baker - South Sudan, Uganda
21. Ottelia ulvifolia (Planch.) Walp. - trop + S Africa, Madagascar
22. Ottelia verdickii Gürke - Tanzania, Zaïre, Zambia, Angola

== Conservation ==
The species belonging to this genus are being increasingly negatively impacted by the use and pollution of their water bodies. They have also been declining as a result of climate change. This will continue to occur as climate change accelerates habitat fragmentation and habitat loss due to changing conditions, including increasing water temperatures.

== Gallery ==
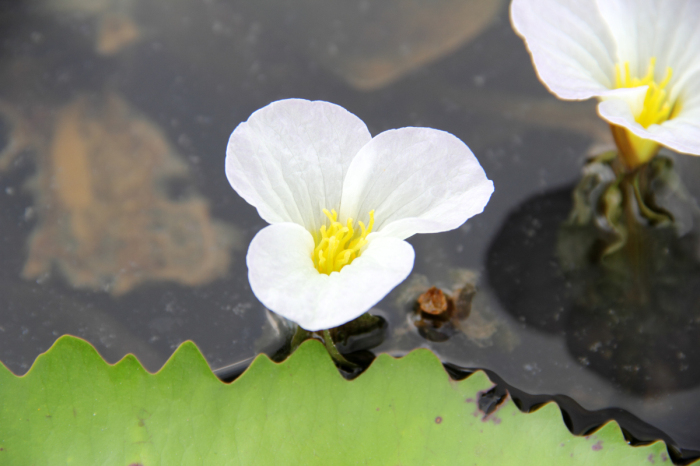
Flower of Ottelia alismoides
