= Jetour Zongheng G700 =

Plug-in hybrid full-size luxury SUV

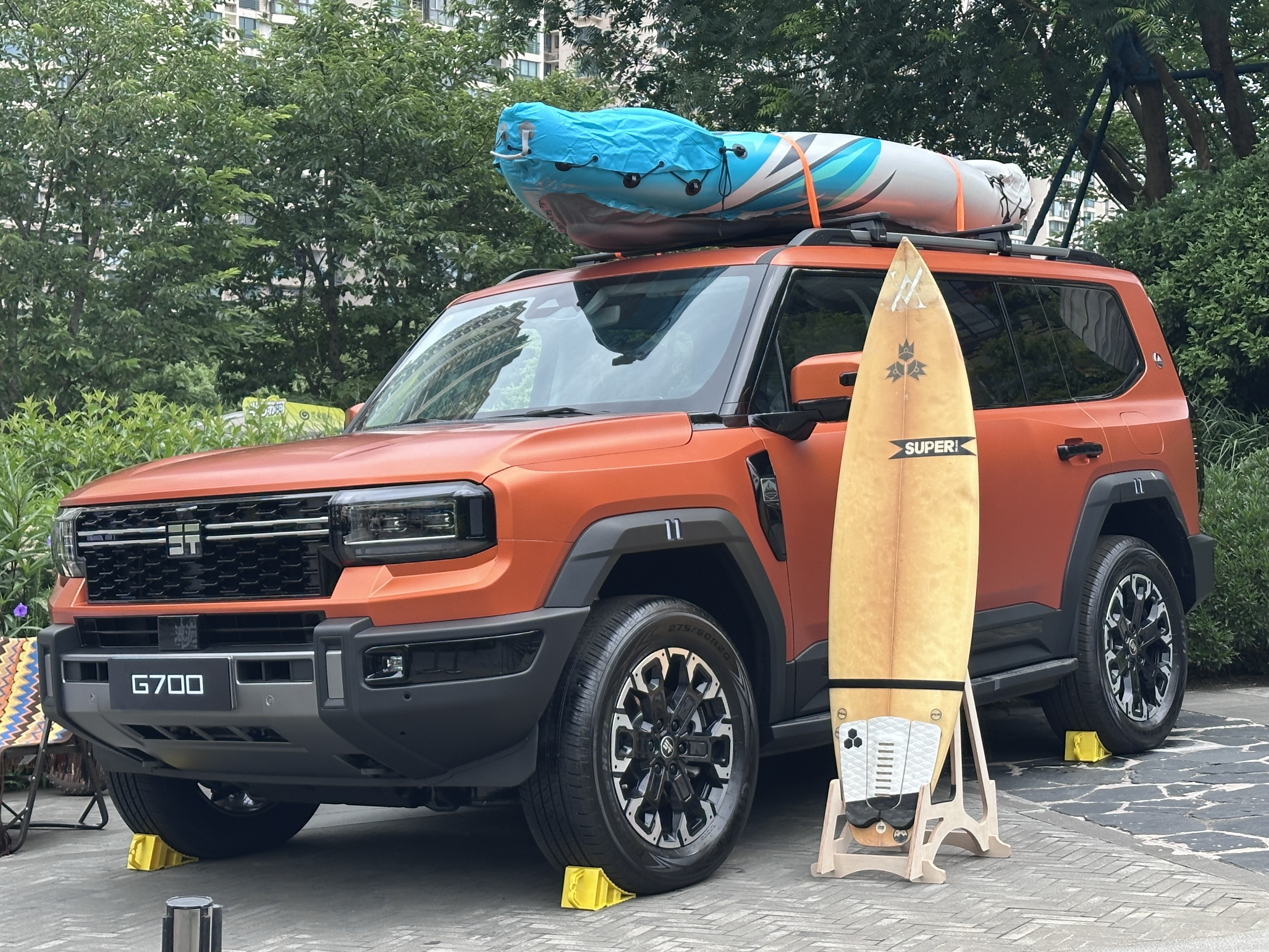

Overview
- Manufacturer: Jetour
- Also called: Jetour G700 (export); Jetour GAIA G700 (Philippines); Tissan G700 (Iran)
- Production: 2025–present
- Assembly: China: Fuzhou, Fujian

Body and chassis
- Class: Full-size luxury SUV
- Body style: 5-door SUV
- Layout: Longitudinal front-engine, dual-motor, all-wheel-drive
- Platform: GAIA platform
- Chassis: Body-on-frame
- Related: Jetour Zongheng F700

Powertrain
- Engine: Gasoline plug-in hybrid: 2.0 L ACTECO SQRH4J20 turbo I4
- Electric motor: PMSM
- Power output: 892 hp (665 kW; 904 PS)
- Transmission: 2-speed Kunpeng DHT
- Hybrid drivetrain: Series-parallel (plug-in hybrid)
- Battery: 34.1 kWh Shenxing LFP CATL; 59.45 kWh Xiaoyao NMC CATL
- Range: 1,400 km (870 mi)
- Electric range: 116–210 km (72–130 mi) (WLTP); 150–260 km (93–162 mi) (CLTC)
- Plug-in charging: DC: 170 kW (34.13 kWh)

Dimensions
- Wheelbase: 2,870 mm (113.0 in)
- Length: 5,198 mm (204.6 in)
- Width: 2,050 mm (80.7 in)
- Height: 1,956 mm (77.0 in)
- Curb weight: 3,063–3,349 kg (6,753–7,383 lb)

The Jetour Zongheng G700 (Chinese: 纵横G700; pinyin: Zònghéng G700) is a plug-in hybrid full-size luxury SUV produced by Chery under the Jetour brand's Zongheng series.

== Overview ==
The Zongheng G700 is a first model under its Zongheng line of body-on-frame, luxury off-road vehicles. It was first unveiled in January 2025.

The Zongheng G700 was previewed as the Jetour Shanhai T5 concept car, which was shown at the 2024 Beijing Auto Show.

The production version of the Zongheng G700 was unveiled at the 2025 Shanghai Auto Show. Pre-sales started during the 2025 Chengdu Auto Show. The Zongheng G700 officially launched on 19 October 2025. On 16 October 2025, three days before the launch of the Zongheng G700, it became the first SUV to cross the Yangtze River.

The Chery CDM-O plug-in hybrid powertrain debuts on the Zongheng G700.

Jetour Zongheng G700 Top Fire

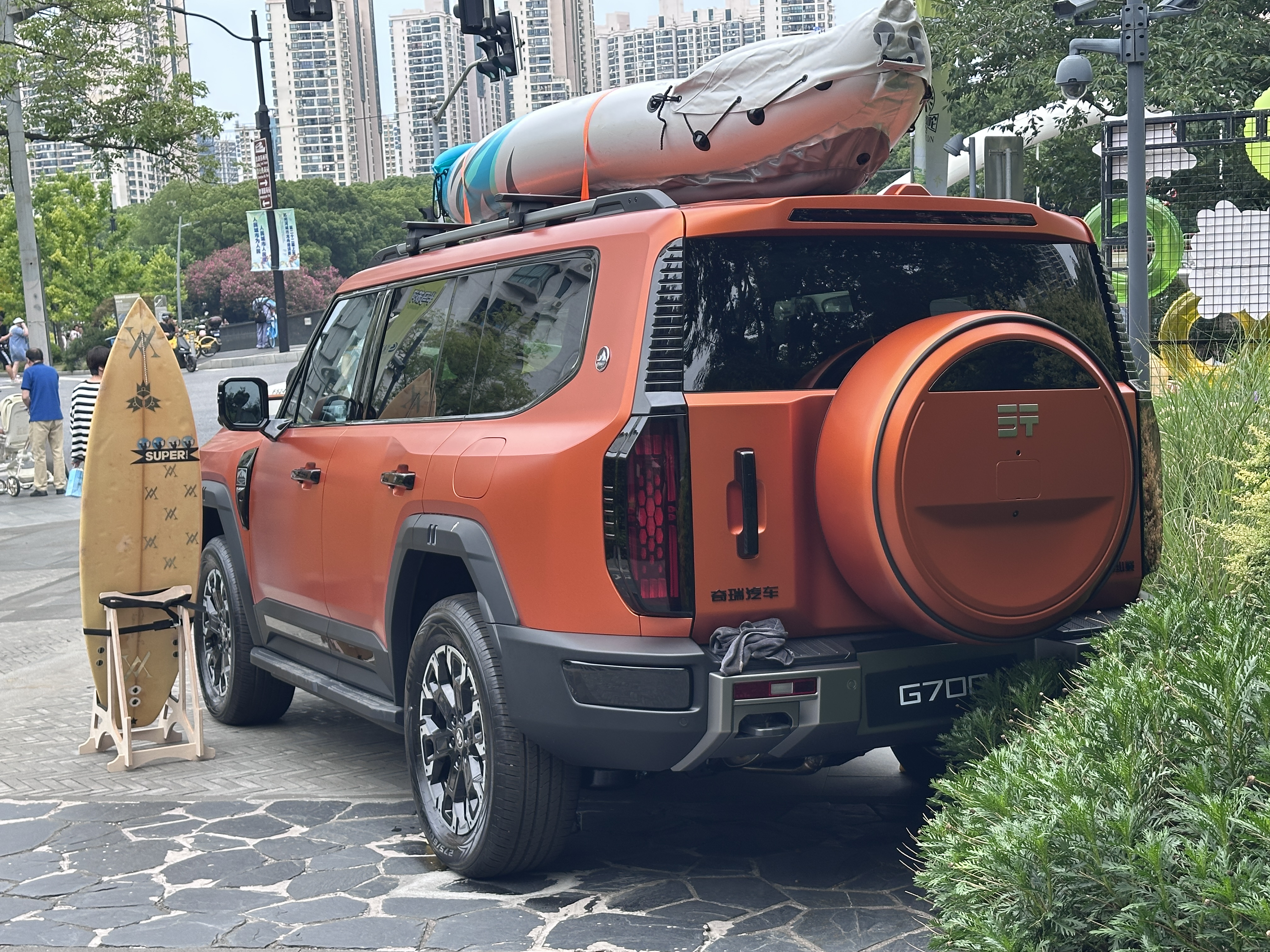
Rear view

Tissan G700 (Iran)

=== Design and features ===
The Zongheng G700 takes on a boxy body design present in other off-roader SUVs from China. As with the Shanhai T5 concept that previewed the Zongheng G700, it features thick bumpers, all-terrain tires, and a spare wheel mounted on the tailgate.

The Zongheng G700 has a body-on-frame chassis with double-wishbone suspension at both front and rear. Jetour says the frame has a torsional rigidity exceeding 10,000 N·m/° while the body has 22,300 N·m/° of torsional stiffness. It is equipped with dual-chamber air suspension with 140 mm (5.5 in) of adjustable ride height.

A 15.6-inch 2.5K-resolution infotainment system and an optional second-row ceiling-mounted 17.3-inch 3K-resolution display are present in the interior. There is also a 35.4-inch pillar-to-pillar screen that replaces the instrument cluster.

Standard variants of the G700 are equipped with a basic Level 2 ADAS system, while intermediate variants are equipped with the Falcon 500 ADAS system, with a sensor suite consisting of 5 mmWave radars, 11 cameras, and 12 ultrasonic sensors, and is powered by a Horizon Robotics J6E chip capable of 80 TOPS and is capable of highway assisted driving. The top variants of the Zongheng G700 are equipped with Huawei's ADS 4, which includes one 192-line roof-mounted LiDAR, 3 millimeter-wave radars, 11 cameras, 12 ultrasonic radars, for a total of 28 sensor elements, providing functions such as highway and off-road NCA and all-scenario parking.

The Zongheng G700 is the second vehicle to include an oxygen generator. (Note: The Leapmotor D19 was the first vehicle to include an oxygen generator.) It can wade in deep water for up to 40 minutes; all versions have a maximum wading depth of at least 900 mm (35.4 in), reaching up to 970 mm (38.2 in) for some variants. While in the water, it has 4,000 newtons (900 lbf; 410 kgf) of thrust and a speed of up to 4.3 knots (8.0 km/h; 4.9 mph).

=== 2026 update ===
An updated version of the Zongheng G700 was revealed on 29 September 2026 and is marketed as the 2027 model year.

The exterior features a redesigned front grille, and the prominent grey plastic bumpers throughout the vehicle have been abandoned for a fully painted body. The interior remains mostly unchanged apart from an updated 1504W 20-speaker sound system, the addition of an optional diamond upholstery stitch pattern and two new interior colors. The Huawei ADAS system has been upgraded to the latest Qiankun ADS 5 system, which uses an 896-line roof-mounted LiDAR and updated software. The powertrain remains unchanged apart from the addition of a new larger battery pack option with up to 210 kilometres (130 mi) of WLTP electric range.

== Markets ==
=== Philippines ===
The Zongheng G700 was introduced in the Philippines on April 13, 2026, as the Jetour GAIA G700, as the first model to be marketed under Jetour's premium sub-brand GAIA. It is available in a single PHEV model.

=== United Arab Emirates ===
The Zongheng G700 was introduced in the United Arab Emirates on 10 September 2025 as the Jetour G700. It offers a single PHEV powertrain option across all trims. The G700 is sold in three trims: Comfort, Luxury, and Flagship.

== Powertrain ==
The Zongheng G700 uses the CDM-O plug-in hybrid system designed for off-road vehicles. It uses a 2.0-litre turbocharged inline-4 codenamed SQRH4J20 producing 195 hp (145 kW; 198 PS) (208 hp (155 kW; 211 PS) gross) and 340 N⋅m (251 lb⋅ft) of torque, paired to a 2-speed series-parallel DHT driving the front wheels. The Zongheng G700's original power output was 751 hp (560 kW; 761 PS). The power figure was revised to 892 hp (665 kW; 904 PS) at launch.

Jetour says the vehicle's XWD-S four-wheel drive system has a maximum wheel torque of 6,314 N⋅m (4,657 lb⋅ft) at the front axle and 10,351 N⋅m (7,635 lb⋅ft) at the rear axle. It is equipped with front and rear locking differentials as standard and has a virtual locking center differential.

It can travel for 870 miles (1,400 km) on the CLTC cycle without having to recharge or refuel.

Specifications
Model	Battery		Power			Torque			Electric range		30–80% charge	0–100 km/h (62 mph)	Top speed
Model	Type	Weight	Front motor	Rear motor	System total	Front motor	Rear motor	System total	WLTP	CLTC	30–80% charge	0–100 km/h (62 mph)	Top speed
Standard range	34.13kWh LFP CATL	303 kg (668 lb)	281 hp (210 kW; 285 PS)	402 hp (300 kW; 408 PS)	892 hp (665 kW; 904 PS)	360 N⋅m (266 lb⋅ft)	435 N⋅m (321 lb⋅ft)	1,135 N⋅m (837 lb⋅ft)	116 km (72 mi)	150 km (93 mi)	10 min	4.6 s	180 km/h (112 mph)
Moab, Topfire	34.13kWh LFP CATL	303 kg (668 lb)	281 hp (210 kW; 285 PS)	402 hp (300 kW; 408 PS)	892 hp (665 kW; 904 PS)	360 N⋅m (266 lb⋅ft)	435 N⋅m (321 lb⋅ft)	1,135 N⋅m (837 lb⋅ft)	100 km (62 mi)	120 km (75 mi)	10 min	5.6 s	180 km/h (112 mph)
Long range	59.45kWh NMC CATL	375 kg (827 lb)	281 hp (210 kW; 285 PS)	402 hp (300 kW; 408 PS)	892 hp (665 kW; 904 PS)	360 N⋅m (266 lb⋅ft)	435 N⋅m (321 lb⋅ft)	1,135 N⋅m (837 lb⋅ft)	210 km (130 mi)	260 km (162 mi)	10 min	4.8 s	180 km/h (112 mph)

== Sales ==
Year	China
2025	1,679
