= Jetour Zongheng F700 =

Plug-in hybrid full-size pickup truck

Overview
- Manufacturer: Jetour
- Also called: Jetour F700 (export); Jetour P5 (South Africa)
- Production: 2026–present
- Assembly: China: Fuzhou, Fujian

Body and chassis
- Class: Full-size pickup truck
- Body style: 4-door pickup truck
- Layout: Longitudinal front-engine, dual-motor, all-wheel-drive
- Platform: GAIA platform
- Related: Jetour Zongheng G700

Powertrain
- Engine: Gasoline plug-in hybrid: 2.0 L ACTECO SQRH4J20 turbocharged I4
- Power output: 892 hp (665 kW; 904 PS) (4x4); 952.13 hp (710 kW; 965 PS) (6x6)
- Transmission: 2-speed Kunpeng DHT
- Hybrid drivetrain: Series-parallel (plug-in hybrid)
- Battery: 34.1 kWh CATL Shenxing LFP

Dimensions
- Wheelbase: 3,350 mm (131.9 in)
- Length: 5,495 mm (216.3 in)
- Width: 2,050 mm (80.7 in)
- Height: 1,985 mm (78.1 in)
- Curb weight: 2,945–3,009 kg (6,493–6,634 lb)

The Jetour Zongheng F700 (Chinese: 捷途纵横F700; pinyin: Jiétú Zònghéng F700) is a plug-in hybrid full-size pickup truck produced by Chery under the Jetour brand's Zongheng series.

== Overview ==
The Zongheng F700 was first announced at a media event in Sandton, South Africa as the Jetour P5 in December 2024, technically making the Zongheng F700 the first of the Zongheng models to be revealed. A silhouette of the Zongheng F700 was also shown at the event.

At the reveal of Jetour Zongheng series on 22 January 2025, the pre-production G700 and the concept versions of the F700 and G900 were shown. It is the 2nd model of the Zongheng series.

It is expected to be sold internationally as the Jetour F700, although it is not yet confirmed for an international release. The Citizen and TopAuto report that the F700 will be sold in South Africa under the afformentioned Jetour P5 name.

Pre-sales began on 20 July 2026, with a starting price of ¥364,900 (~$53,900). The first units arrived at dealerships on July 29, 2026. The Zongheng F700 was officially launched on August 6, 2026.

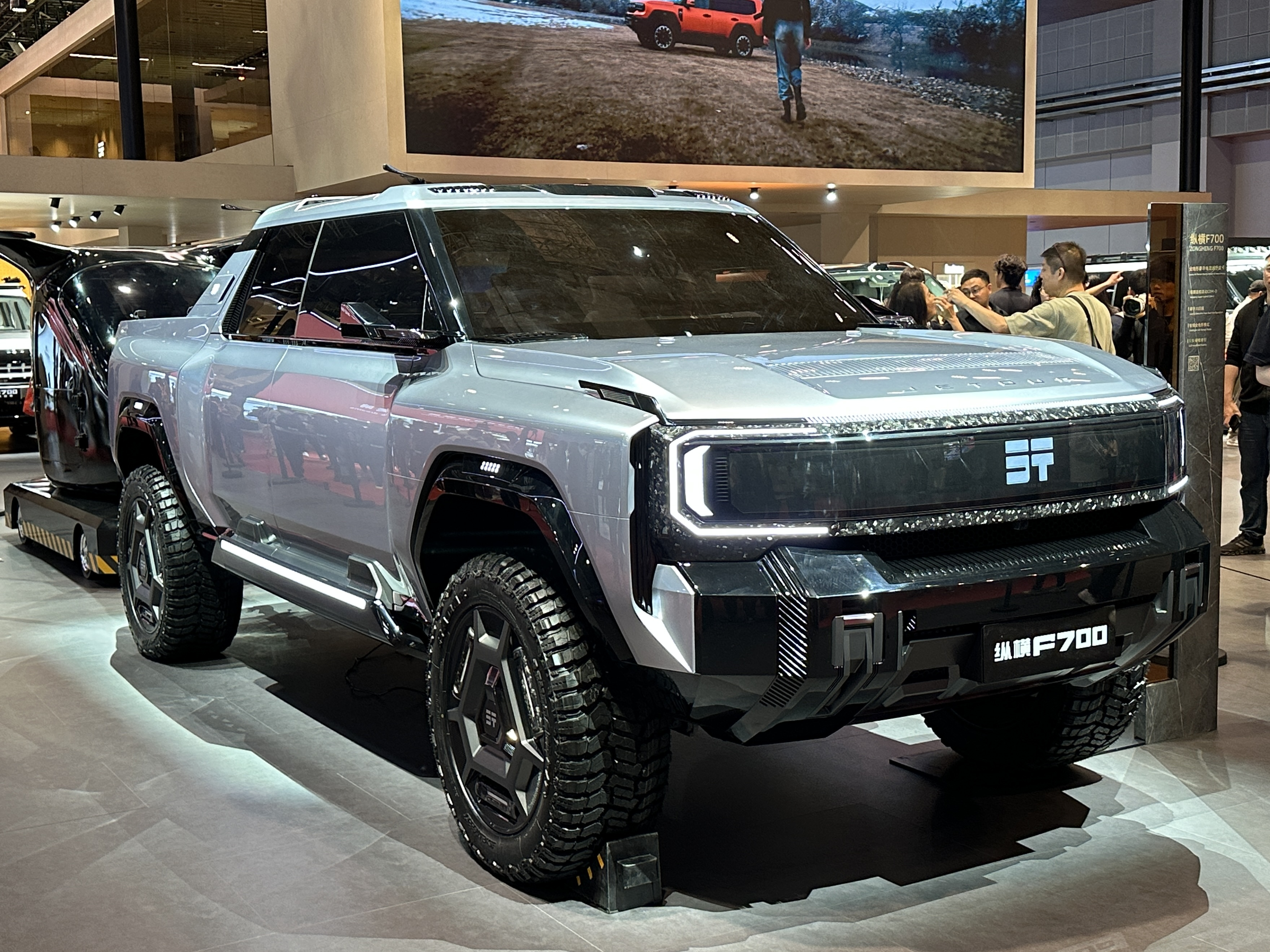
Jetour Zongheng F700 Concept

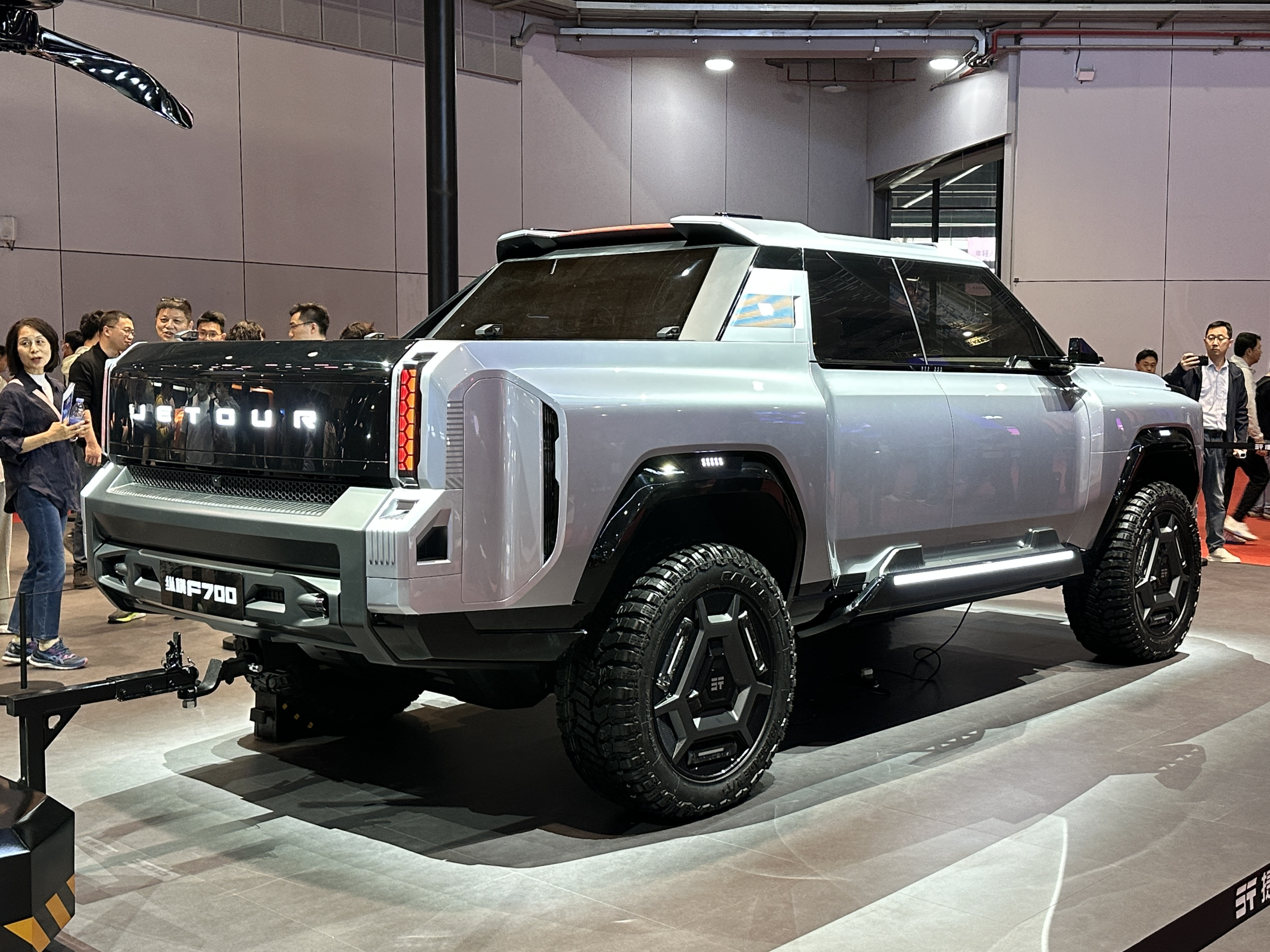
Rear view

=== Design and features ===
The production version of the Zongheng F700 will use the same design language as the Zongheng G700. (Note: Leaked design patents from Argentina were the first to show off the Zongheng F700's design, which confirmed that the design language would be similar to the Zongheng G700.) The concept version had rear-hinged doors, cameras replacing the side mirrors, no B-pillars, all-terrain tires, and wide wheel arches. The exterior colours represent locations, such as Tulin Brown 29.33°N 95.33°E [sic], Kunlun Grey 36°N 84°E, Changtang Silver 33°N 83°E and Medog Black 29.33°N 95.33°E.

Initial spyshots indicated the F700's interior will feature a 13-inch central touchscreen, a 10.25-inch LCD instrument cluster, leather seats, a three-spoke steering wheel, and physical controls for air conditioning.

An undisguised Zongheng F700 was spotted on December 1, 2025, confirming the speculation that the Zongheng F700 would use the same design language as the G700.

The interior of the Zongheng F700 features the Horizon Screen, a 35.4-inch screen placed above the dashboard that goes across it as a result, and a 15.6-inch floating central touchscreen. Both the Horizon Screen and the touchscreen run Zongheng OS and are powered by Qualcomm's Snapdragon 8255 chip. The interior has Cloud Rest seats with massage functions for the front seats, alongside heating and ventilation for both front and rear seats. The Zongheng F700 is also equipped with Chery's Falcon 500 navigation assistance system.

== Markets ==
=== Middle East ===
The F700 was unveiled in the Middle East, with pre-bookings in the United Arab Emirates opening on 28 October 2026. It uses a plug-in hybrid powertrain combining a 2.0-litre turbocharged petrol engine with front and rear electric motors, a two-speed Dedicated Hybrid Transmission (DHT), and electric all-wheel drive; the system produces up to 665 kW (892 hp) and 1,135 N·m of torque. It is equipped with a 34.13 kWh battery on an 800 V platform, supporting up to 175 kW DC fast charging.

== Powertrain and chassis ==
The Zongheng F700 shares the CDM-O plug-in hybrid powertrain with the Zongheng G700.

The Zongheng F700 is powered by a 2.0 liter turbocharged inline-4 gasoline engine. Codenamed SQRH4J20, the engine produces 208 horsepower (155 kW; 211 PS) and is shared with the Zongheng G700. As the Zongehng F700 is a plug-in hybrid, it has electric motors additionally powering the front and rear axles. The Zongheng F700's combined power output is 892 horsepower (665 kW; 904 PS) and 837 pound-feet (1,135 N⋅m) of torque. It uses CATL's 34.1 kWh Shenxing lithium iron phosphate battery, enabling an electric-only range of 93 miles (150 km) and a combined range of 808 miles (1,300 km).

=== Powertrain dispute ===
The exact amount of motors to be used by the CDM-O system in the Zongheng F700 was disputed. Websites such as CarExpert and Formacar said the Zongheng F700 will use a dual-motor layout, while websites such as BitAuto and multiple Chinese sources claimed it would use a quad-motor layout. (Note: The CDM-O plug-in hybrid system shown at the reveal of the Zongheng series, which is the system to be used in the Zongheng F700, uses two motors. The CEM-O system for extended range EVs uses a quad-motor layout.)

=== Suspension ===
Spyshots show of the Zongheng F700 chassis uses 4-wheel independent suspension with double wishbones in the front and a multi-link rear axle in the rear.
