= Quercus cocciferoides =

Conservation status
- Least Concern (IUCN 3.1)

Scientific classification
- Kingdom: Plantae
- Clade: Embryophytes
- Clade: Tracheophytes
- Clade: Spermatophytes
- Clade: Angiosperms
- Clade: Eudicots
- Clade: Rosids
- Order: Fagales
- Family: Fagaceae
- Genus: Quercus
- Subgenus: Quercus subg. Cerris
- Section: Quercus sect. Ilex
- Species: Q. cocciferoides

Binomial name
- Quercus cocciferoides Hand.-Mazz.

Varieties
- Quercus cocciferoides var. cocciferoides; Quercus cocciferoides var. taliensis (A.Camus) Y.C.Hsu & H.Wei Jen

Species of flowering plant

Quercus cocciferoides is a species of oak. It is a tree native to Sichuan and Yunnan provinces of south-central China.

The species was described by Heinrich von Handel-Mazzetti in 1925.

Two varieties are accepted:

- Quercus cocciferoides var. cocciferoides – Sichuan and Yunnan
- Quercus cocciferoides var. taliensis (A.Camus) Y.C.Hsu & H.Wei Jen (synonym Quercus taliensis A.Camus) – Sichuan and Yunnan
