= Quercus delavayi =

Conservation status
- Least Concern (IUCN 3.1)

Scientific classification
- Kingdom: Plantae
- Clade: Embryophytes
- Clade: Tracheophytes
- Clade: Spermatophytes
- Clade: Angiosperms
- Clade: Eudicots
- Clade: Rosids
- Order: Fagales
- Family: Fagaceae
- Genus: Quercus
- Subgenus: Quercus subg. Cerris
- Section: Quercus sect. Cyclobalanopsis
- Species: Q. delavayi

Binomial name
- Quercus delavayi Franch.

Synonyms
- Cyclobalanopsis delavayi (Franch.) Schottky; Synaedrys delavayi (Franch.) Koidz.

Species of tree

Quercus delavayi is a tree species in the beech family, native to southern China. It has been recorded in the provinces of Guizhou, Hubei, Sichuan, Yunnan, and Guangxi. The species is classified under the subgenus Cerris, section Cyclobalanopsis. It grows in montane lauraceous or mixed oak and pine forests from 1,000 to 2,800 metres elevation.

Quercus delavayi is a tree up to 20 metres (66 ft) tall. It has twigs and the undersides of its leaves covered with reddish-brown hairs. The leaves can reach lengths of up to 12 centimeters (4.7 inches).
