= Physospermopsis =

Scientific classification
- Kingdom: Plantae
- Clade: Tracheophytes
- Clade: Angiosperms
- Clade: Eudicots
- Clade: Asterids
- Order: Apiales
- Family: Apiaceae
- Subfamily: Apioideae
- Genus: Physospermopsis; H.Wolff

Genus of plants

Physospermopsis is a genus of flowering plants belonging to the family Apiaceae.

Its native range is Nepal to Southern Central China and Northern Thailand.

Species:

- Physospermopsis alepidioides (H.Wolff & Hand.-Mazz.) R.H.Shan
- Physospermopsis delavayi (Franch.) H.Wolff
- Physospermopsis handelii (H.Wolff) Pimenov & Kljuykov
- Physospermopsis muliensis R.H.Shan & S.L.Liou
- Physospermopsis nana (Franch.) Pimenov & Kljuykov
- Physospermopsis obtusiuscula (DC.) C.Norman
- Physospermopsis shaniana C.Y.Wu & F.T.Pu
- Physospermopsis siamensis Esser & M.F.Watson
