= Tulin (geology) =

Landform caused by earth movement and erosion

Tulin (Chinese: 土林), meaning “earth forest”, is a form of geological clay formation. It takes the form of pillars which from a distance give the impression of a forest.

There are multiple examples of tulins in Yuanmou County in the Yunnan Province of China, in an area of about 50 square kilometers. The tallest formation has a height of 40 meters (130 ft). The features are one to two million years old. The area was opened for tourism as the Yuanmou Earth Forest (Tulin in Chinese) in 1985.

== Tulin formations in Yuanmou ==
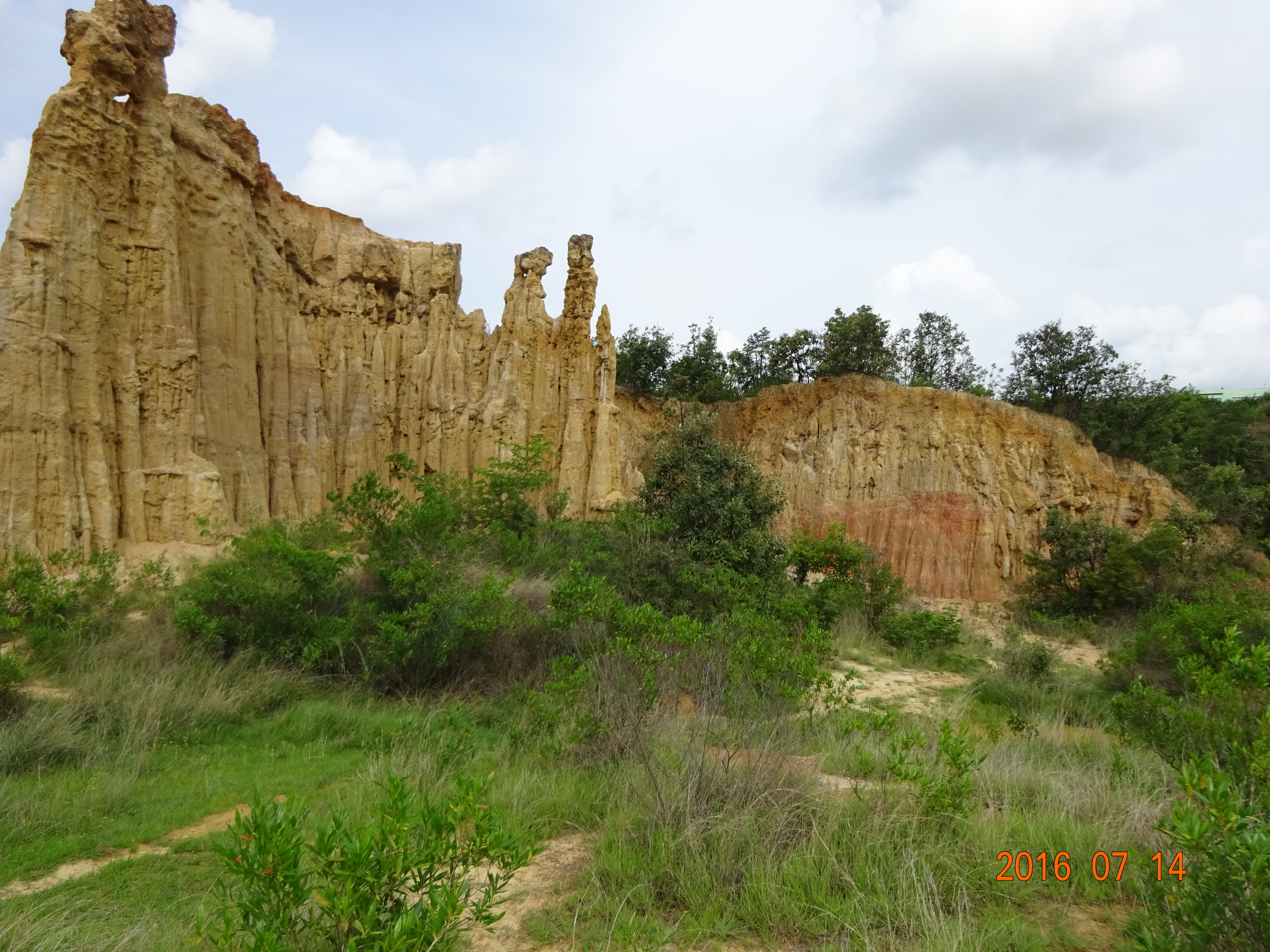

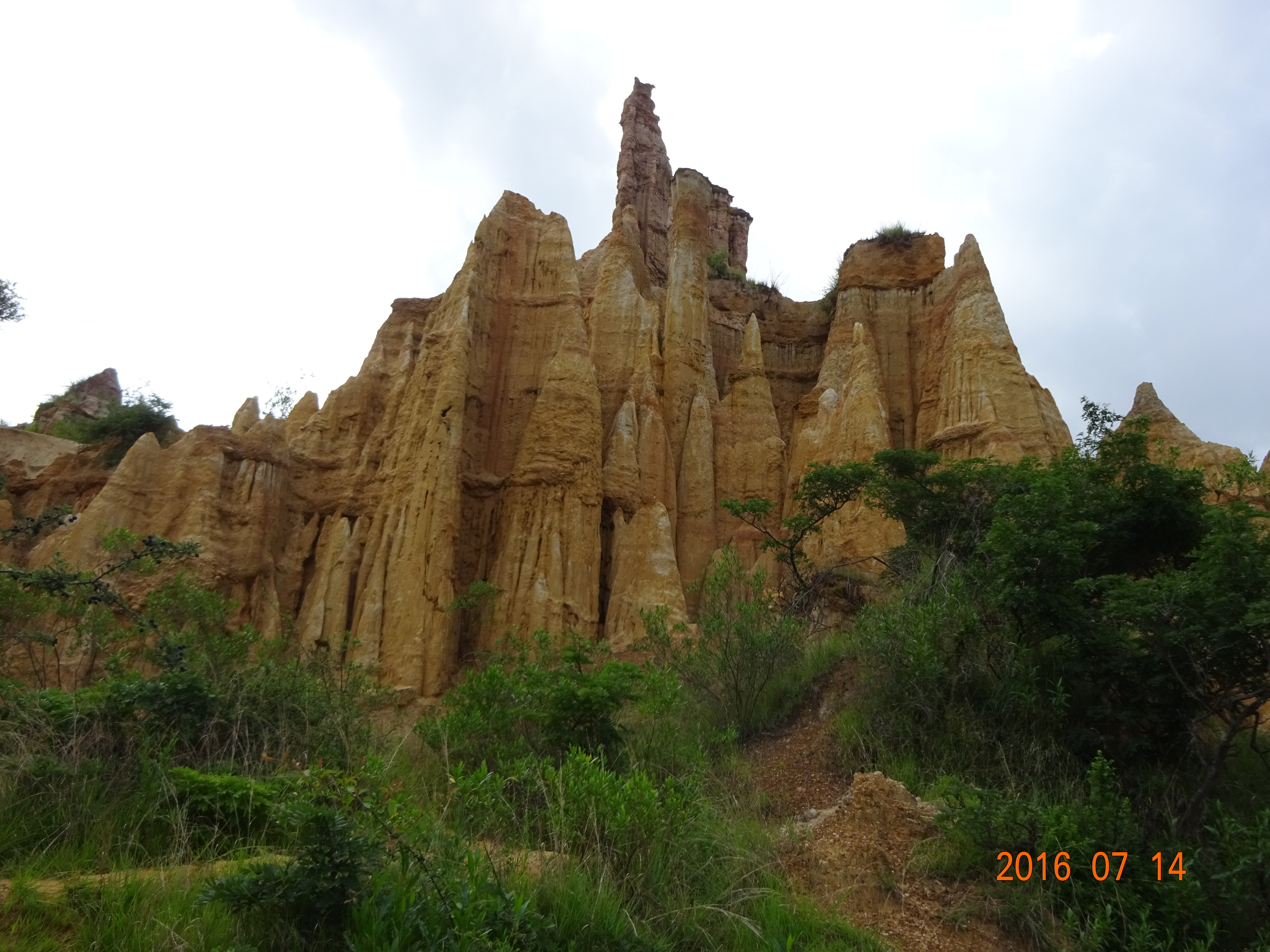

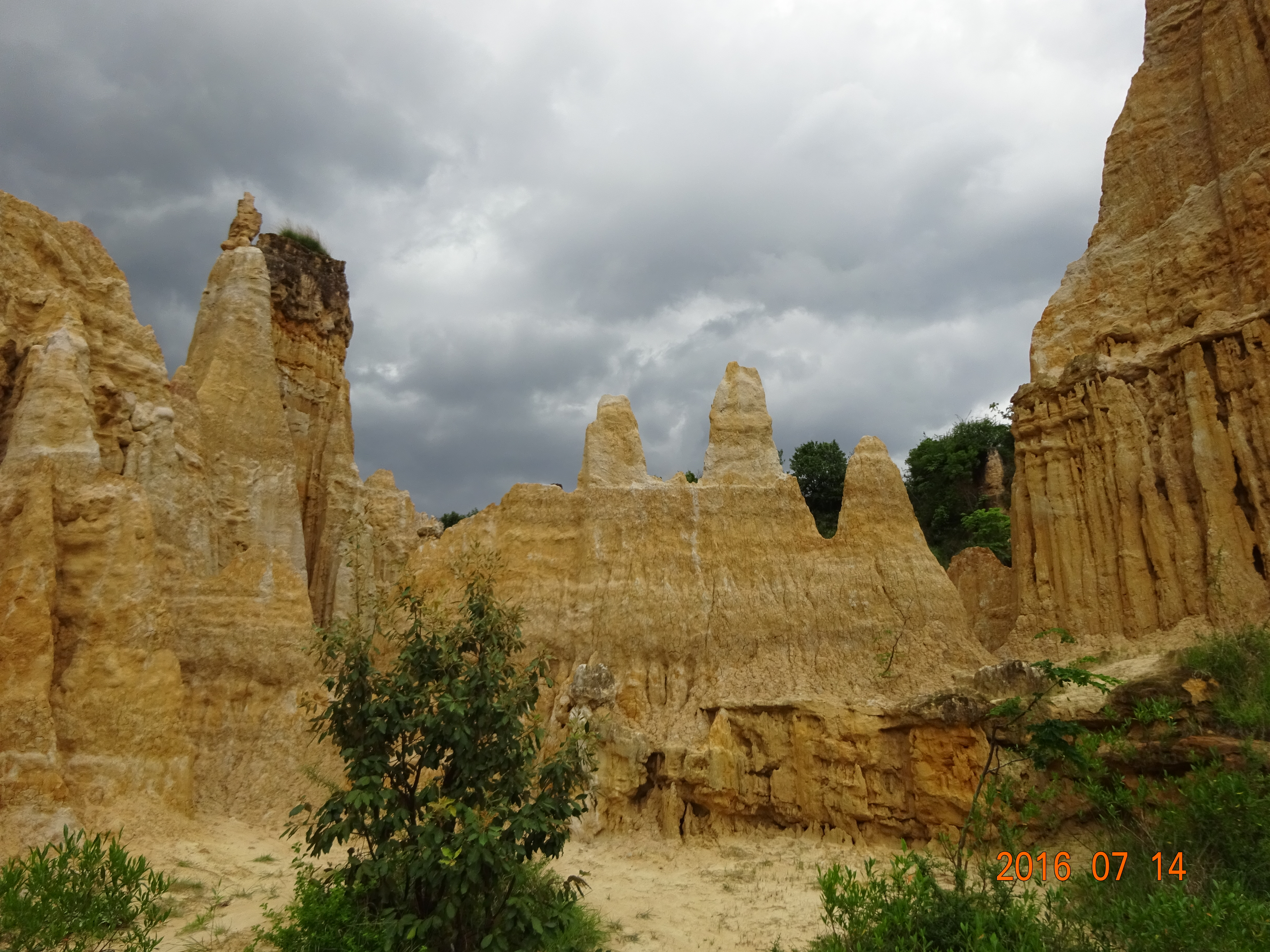

== Other tulins in China ==
- Longyangxia Tulin (龙羊峡土林) in Gonghe County, Hainan Tibetan Autonomous Prefecture, Qinghai.
- Zanda Tulin (札达土林) in Zanda County, Ngari Prefecture, Tibet.
- Nanjian Tulin (南涧土林) in Nanjian Yi Autonomous County, Dali, Yunnan.
- Jingdong Tulin (景东土林) in Jingdong Yi Autonomous County, Pu'er City, Yunnan.
- Yongde Tulin (永德土林) in Yongde County, Lincang, Yunnan.

== See also ==
- Stone Forest
- Hoodoo
- Tsingy de Bemaraha Strict Nature Reserve
