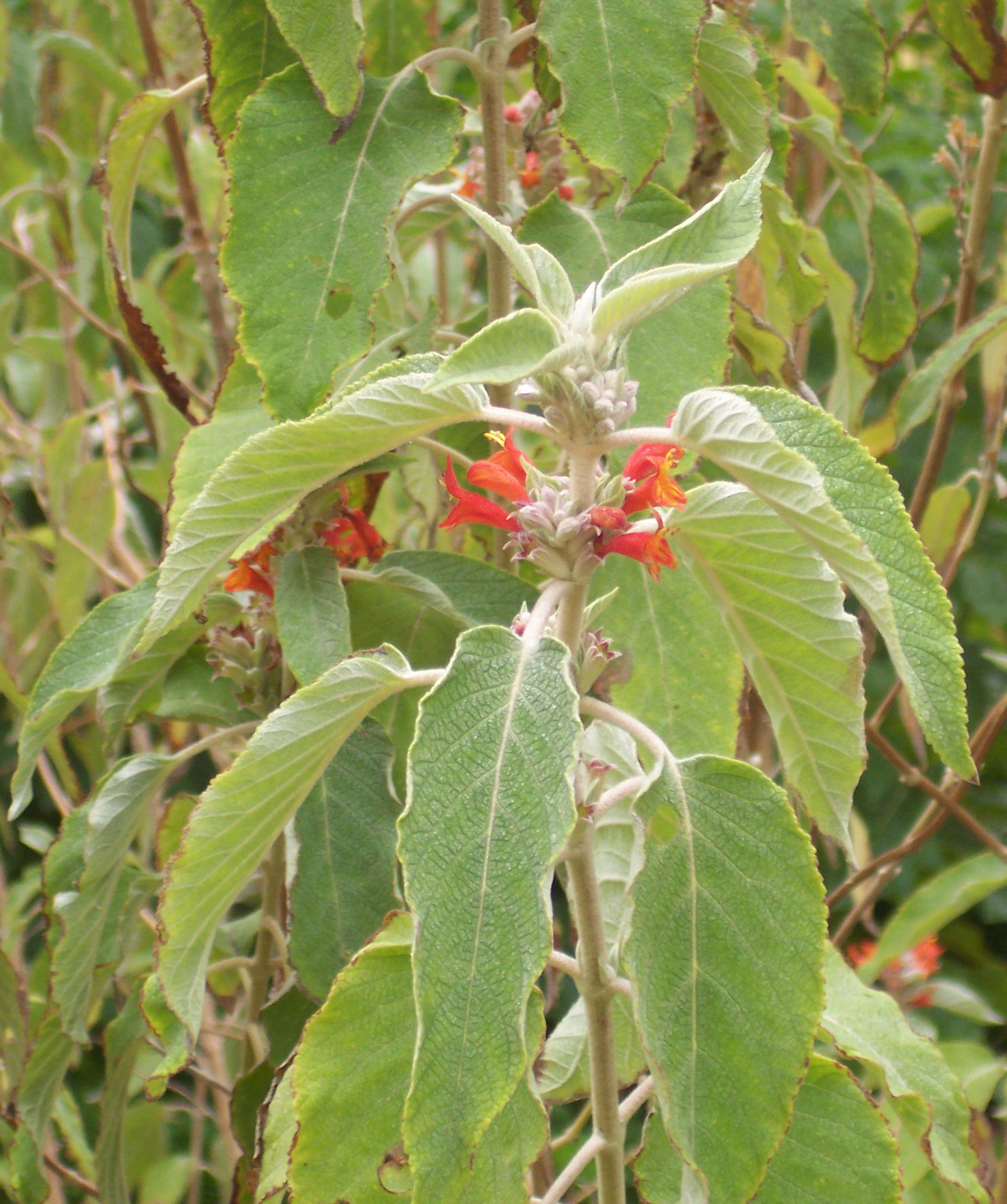
- Colquhounia coccinea

Scientific classification
- Kingdom: Plantae
- Clade: Tracheophytes
- Clade: Angiosperms
- Clade: Eudicots
- Clade: Asterids
- Order: Lamiales
- Family: Lamiaceae
- Subfamily: Lamioideae
- Genus: Colquhounia; Wall.

= Colquhounia =

Genus of flowering plants

Colquhounia is a genus of about six species of evergreen or semi-evergreen shrubs or subshrubs in the family Lamiaceae, first described in 1822. They are native to the Himalaya and southwestern China south to Peninsular Malaysia.

They are shrubs growing to 1 to 3 metres (3 ft 3 in to 9 ft 10 in) tall, rarely to 4 metres (13 ft). The aromatic leaves are to 3 to 12 centimetres (1.2 to 4.7 in) long and 1 to 6 centimetres (0.39 to 2.36 in), finely toothed and borne in opposite pairs on the square stems. The flowers are tubular, two-lipped, and carried on terminal spikes.

Species include:

1. Colquhounia coccinea Wall. - Tibet, Yunnan, Bhutan, Assam, Arunachal Pradesh, Myanmar, Nepal, Thailand
2. Colquhounia compta W.W.Sm. - Sichuan, Yunnan
3. Colquhounia elegans Wall. - Yunnan, Myanmar, Thailand, Vietnam, Laos, Cambodia
4. Colquhounia seguinii Vaniot - Guangxi, Guizhou, Hubei, Sichuan, Yunnan, Myanmar
5. Colquhounia vestita Wall. - Yunnan, Assam, Bhutan, Nepal, Himalayas of northern + eastern India
