= Ottelia acuminata =

- Ottelia acuminata served as food in Dali, China

Scientific classification
- Kingdom: Plantae
- Clade: Tracheophytes
- Clade: Angiosperms
- Clade: Monocots
- Order: Alismatales
- Family: Hydrocharitaceae
- Genus: Ottelia
- Species: O. acuminata

Binomial name
- Ottelia acuminata (Gagnep.) Dandy

Species of flowering plant

Ottelia acuminata, is a plant species endemic to Southern China.

== Description ==
The whole plant is underwater, except for the showy three-petaled flowers with lobes.

Varieties

1. Ottelia acuminata var. acuminata - Guangdong, Guangxi, Guizhou, Hainan, Sichuan, Yunnan.
2. Ottelia acuminata var. crispa (Hand.-Mazz.) H. Li - Yunnan (Lugu Hu).
3. Ottelia acuminata var. jingxiensis H. Q. Wang & S. C. Sun - Guangxi (Jingxi).
4. Ottelia acuminata var. lunanensis H. Li - Yunnan (Lugu Hu).
