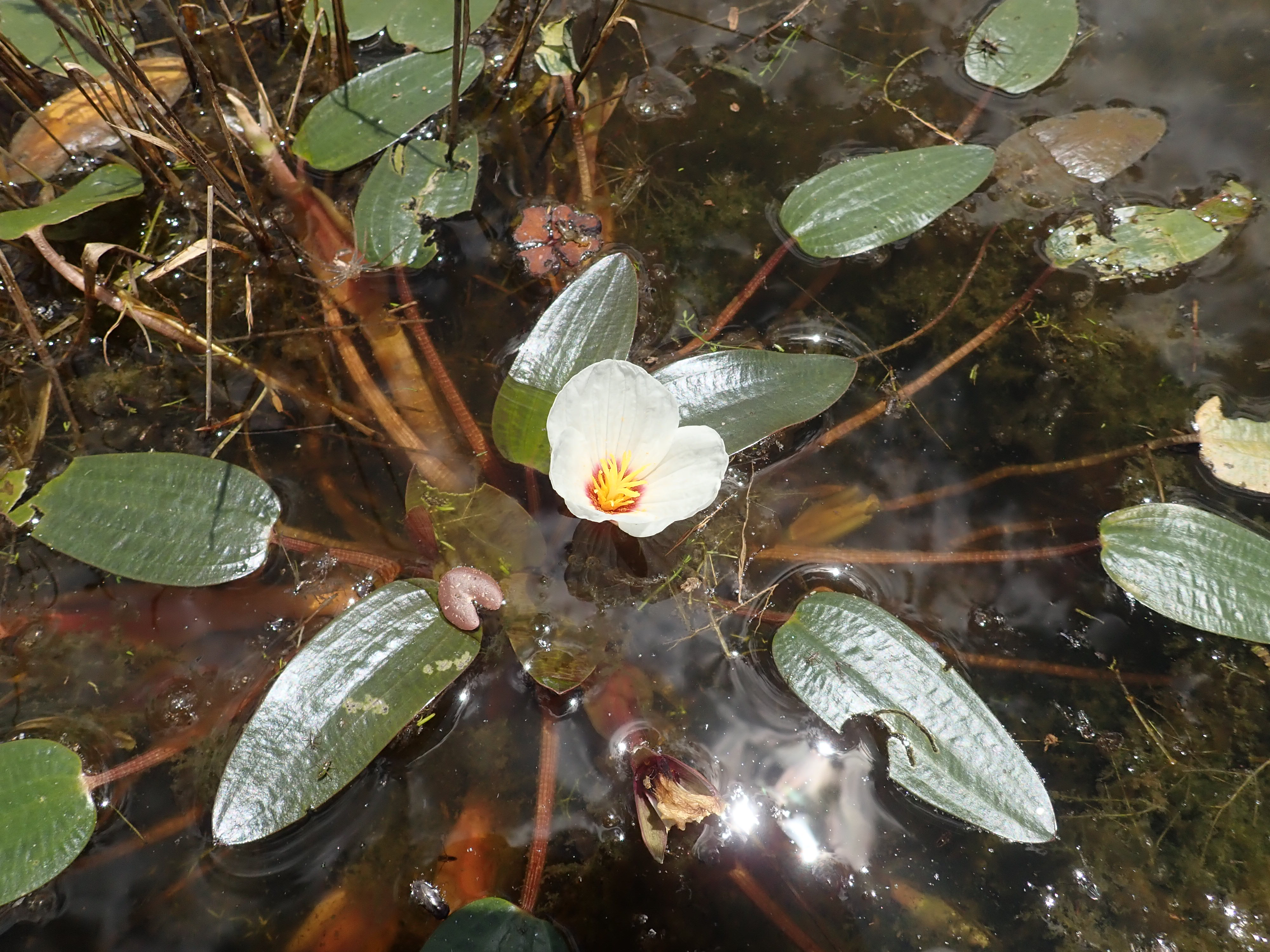

Scientific classification
- Kingdom: Plantae
- Clade: Embryophytes
- Clade: Tracheophytes
- Clade: Spermatophytes
- Clade: Angiosperms
- Clade: Monocots
- Order: Alismatales
- Family: Hydrocharitaceae
- Genus: Ottelia
- Species: O. ovalifolia

Binomial name
- Ottelia ovalifolia (R.Br.) Rich.
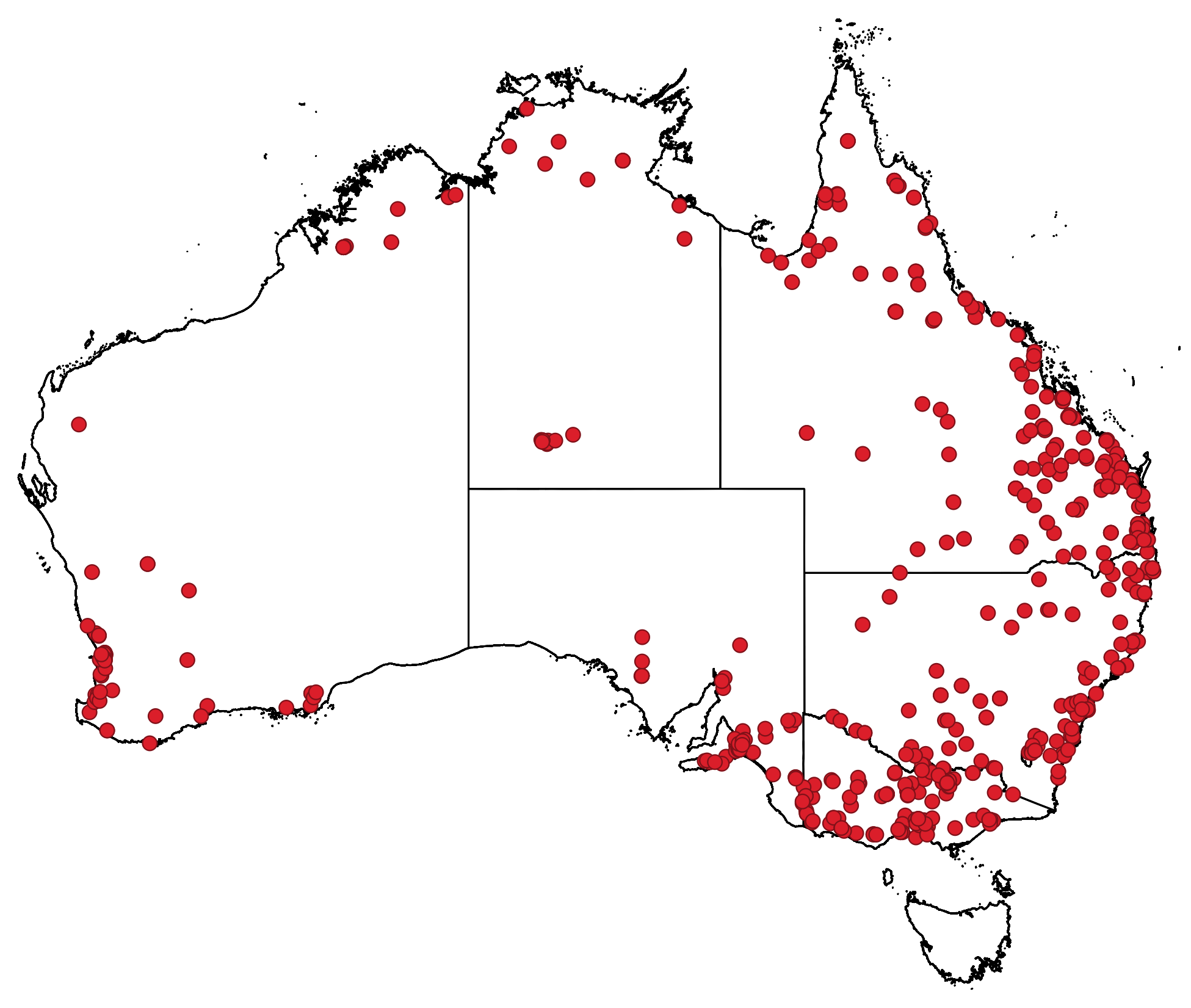
- Occurrence data from AVH

= Ottelia ovalifolia =

Species of flowering plant

Ottelia ovalifolia, commonly known as swamp lily, is a species of aquatic plant belonging to the Hydrocharitaceae family and native to the Australian mainland. Ottelia ovalifolia has been introduced into New Zealand, Vanuatu and the Solomon Islands.
