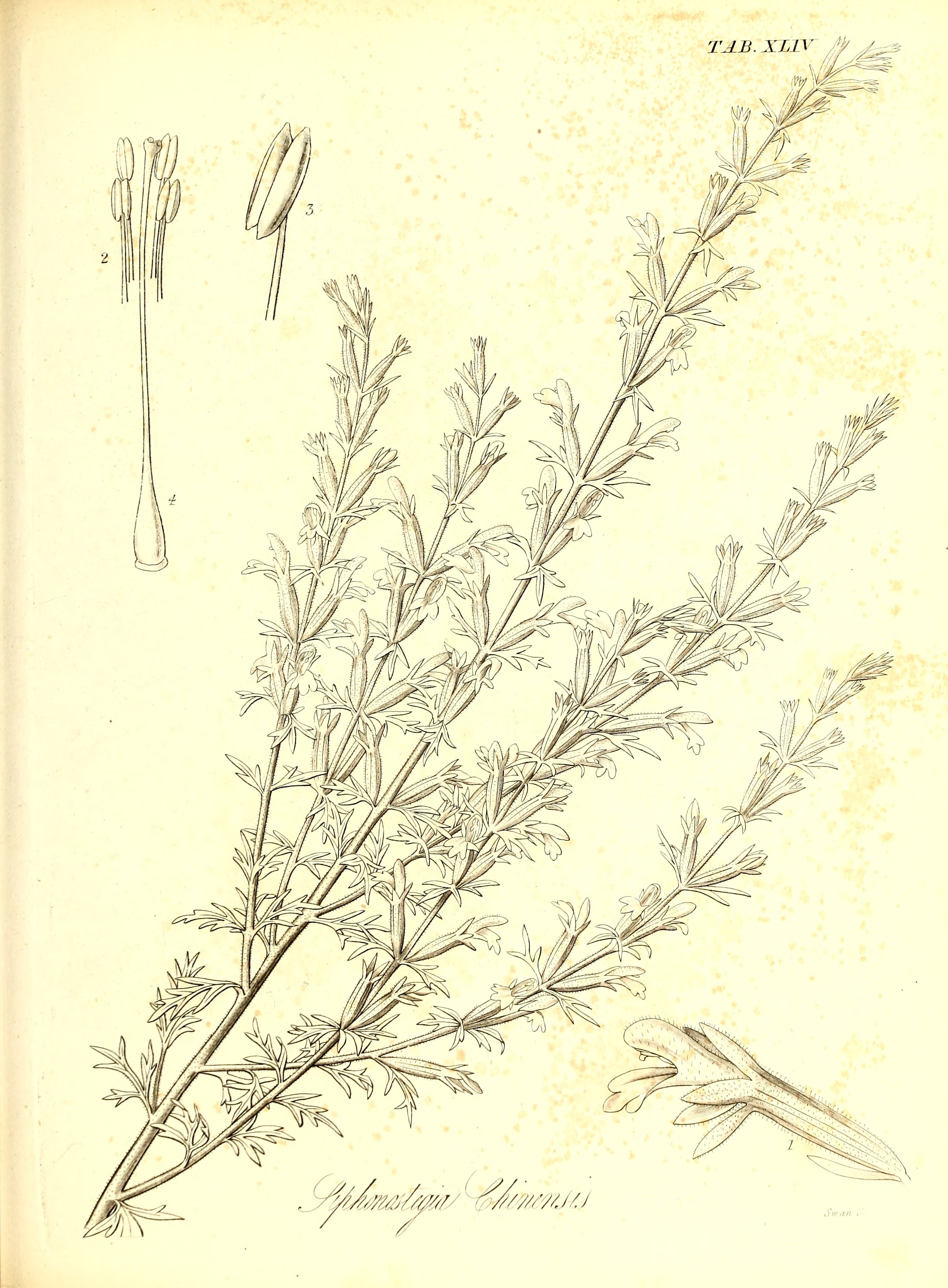
- The botany of Captain Beechey's voyage; comprising an account of the plants collected by Messrs. Lay and Collie, and other officers of the expedition, during the voyage to the Pacific and Behring

Scientific classification
- Kingdom: Plantae
- Clade: Tracheophytes
- Clade: Angiosperms
- Clade: Eudicots
- Clade: Asterids
- Order: Lamiales
- Family: Orobanchaceae
- Genus: Siphonostegia; Benth.

= Siphonostegia =

Genus of flowering plants

Siphonostegia is a genus of flowering plants belonging to the family Orobanchaceae.

Its native range is Eastern Mediterranean, China to Russian Far East and Temperate Eastern Asia.

== Species ==
Species:

- Siphonostegia chinensis Benth.
- Siphonostegia laeta S.Moore
- Siphonostegia syriaca (Boiss. & Reut.) Boiss.
