= Frogbit =

Frogbit or frog's bit is a common name for several plants in the family Hydrocharitaceae and may refer to:

- Hydrocharis morsus-ranae – European frogbit
- Hydrocharis laevigata – Amazon frogbit, South American frogbit
- Hydrocharis spongia – American frogbit

== See also ==
- Ranunculus hydrocharoides, frog's bit buttercup
