= Stratification (vegetation) =

Vertical layering of a habitat

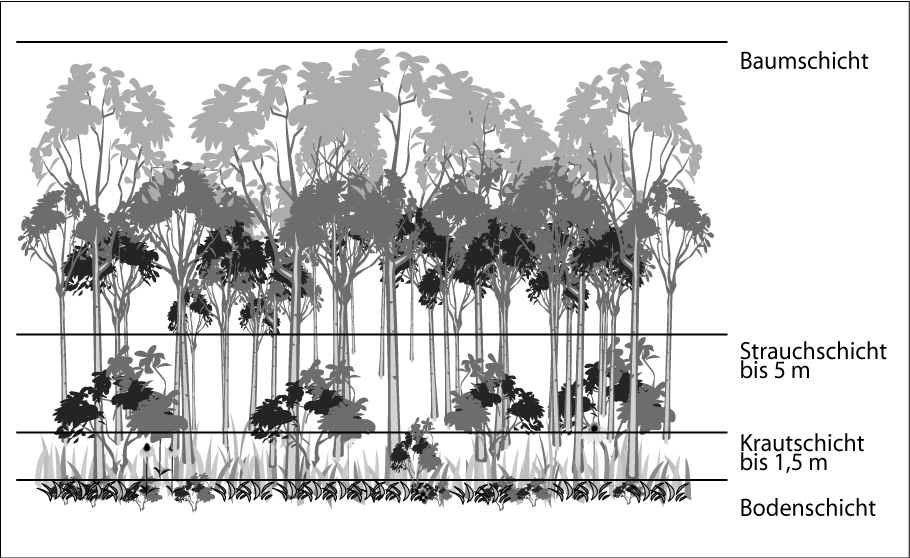
The vertical stratification of a community is determined largely by the life forms of plants their size, branching and leaves which is influenced by the vertical gradient of light. Vertical classification of vegetation in a forest showing the tree, shrub and herb layers and the forest floor. This can be seen from the different heights different plants grow to reach and the stratazones they form in their respective niches.

In ecology, stratification refers to the vertical layering of a habitat; the arrangement of vegetation in layers. It classifies the layers (sing. stratum, pl. strata) of vegetation largely according to the different heights to which their plants grow. The individual layers are inhabited by different animal and plant communities (stratozones).

== Vertical structure in terrestrial plant habitats ==
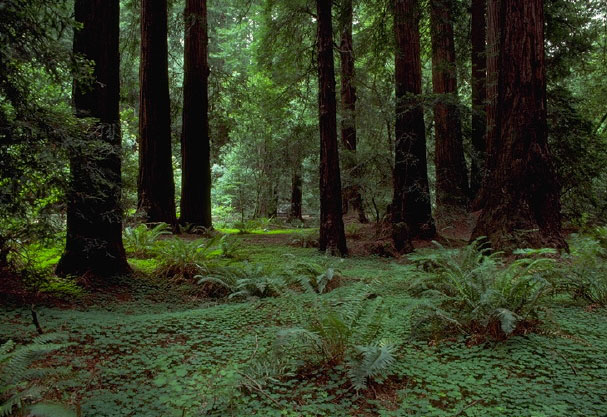
Forest with canopy, shrub and herb layers of vegetation

The following layers are generally distinguished: forest floor (root and moss layers), herb, shrub, understory and canopy layers. These vegetation layers are primarily determined by the height of their individual plants, the different elements may however have a range of heights. The actual layer is characterised by the height range in which the vast majority of photosynthetic organs (predominantly leaves) are found. Taller species will have part of their shoot system in the underlying layers. In addition to the above-ground stratification there is also a "root layer". In the broadest sense, the layering of diaspores in the soil may be counted as part of the vertical structure. The plants of a layer, especially with regard to their way of life and correspondingly similar root distribution interact closely and compete strongly for space, light, water and nutrients. The stratification of a plant community is the result of long selection and adaptation processes. Through the formation of different layers a given habitat is better utilized. Strongly vertically stratified habitats are very stable ecosystems. The opposite is not true, because several less stratified vegetation types, such as reed beds, can be very stable. The layers of a habitat are closely interrelated and at least partly interdependent. This is often the case as a result of the changes in microclimate of the top layers, the light factor being of particular importance.

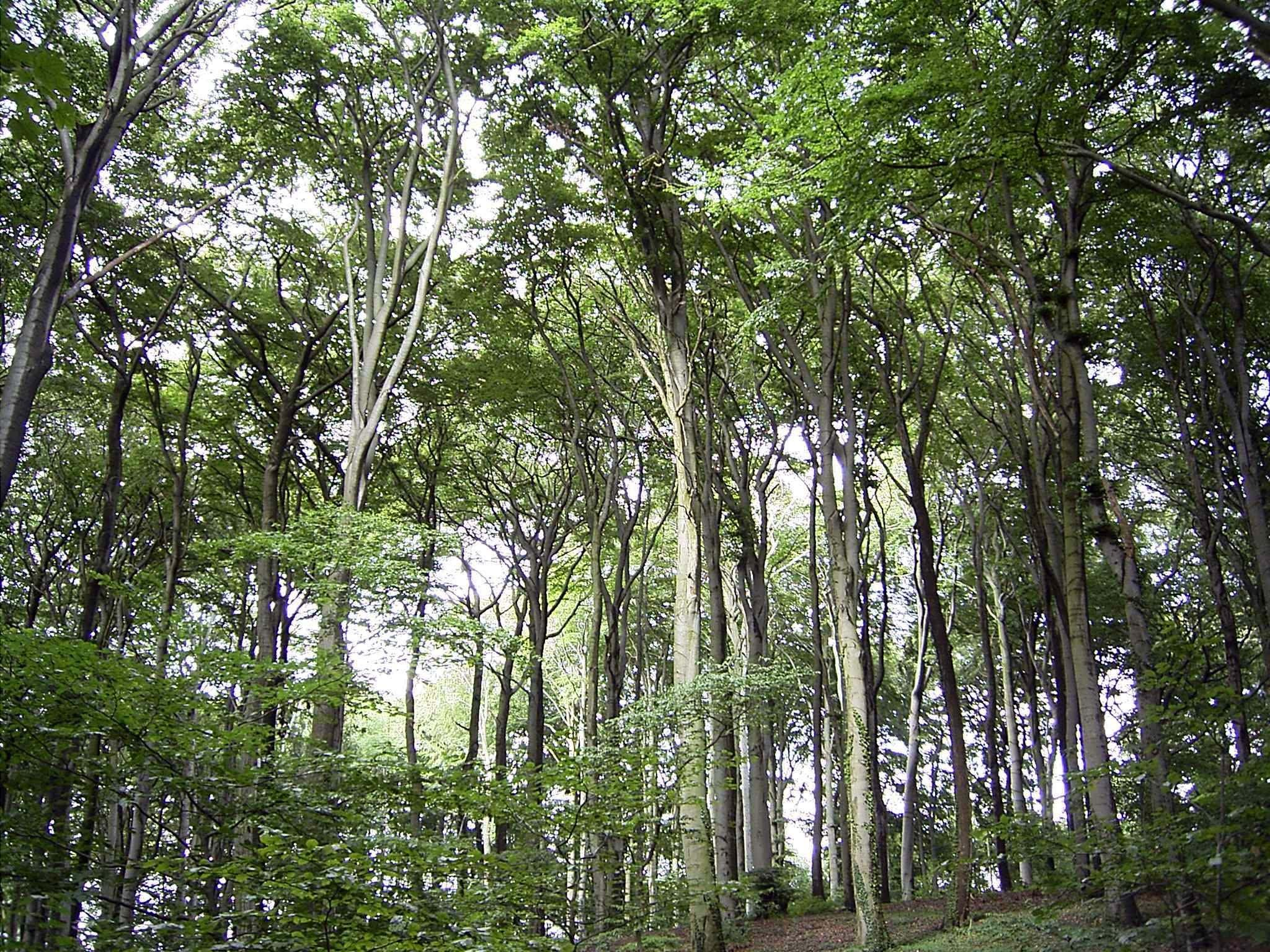
View of the canopy and understory beneath

Besides the superposition of different plants growing on the same soil, there is a lateral impact of the higher layers on adjacent plant communities, for example, at the edges of forests and bushes. This particular vegetation structure results in the growth of certain vegetation types such as forest mantle and margin communities.

=== Tree layer ===
This layer of vegetation starts from a height of about 5 metres and comprises the top stratum, which consists of phanerophytes. They can be about 45 metres high. The trees (and sometimes shrubs) are of various heights. One tree has its crown at the height of another's trunk. At the top the crowns of the different species of trees form a more or less closed canopy. This layer creates special ecological conditions in the underlying layers of forests. The density of the trees determines the amount of light inside the forest. The force of heavy rainfall is reduced by the canopy and the passage of rainwater is fed more slowly downwards. The tree layer can be further subdivided into the upper tree layer or canopy and the lower tree layer or understory.

==== Canopy ====
The canopy usually refers to the highest layer of vegetation in a forest or woodland, made up of the crowns of its tallest trees. However, individual trees growing above the general layer of the canopy may form an emergent layer.

==== Understory ====
The understory can refer to those trees above the shrub layer and below the canopy, but is often defined more broadly, including the shrub layer.

=== Shrub layer ===
The shrub layer is the stratum of vegetation within a habitat with heights of about 1.5 to 5 metres. This layer consists mostly of young trees and bushes, and it may be divided into the first and second shrub layers (low and high bushes). The shrub layer needs sun and little moisture, unlike the moss layer which requires a lot of water. The shrub layer only receives light filtered by the canopy, i.e. it is preferred by semi-shade or shade-loving plants that would not tolerate bright sunlight. Small to medium sized birds sometimes known as bush nesters are often found in the shrub layer where their nests are protected by foliage. European examples include blackbird, song thrush, robin or blackcap. In addition to shrubs, such as elder, hazel, hawthorn, raspberry and blackberry, clematis may also occur while, in other parts of the world, vines and lianas may form part of this stratum. At the edge of a woodland the shrub layer acts as a windbreak close to the trees and protects the soil from drying out.

=== Herb layer ===
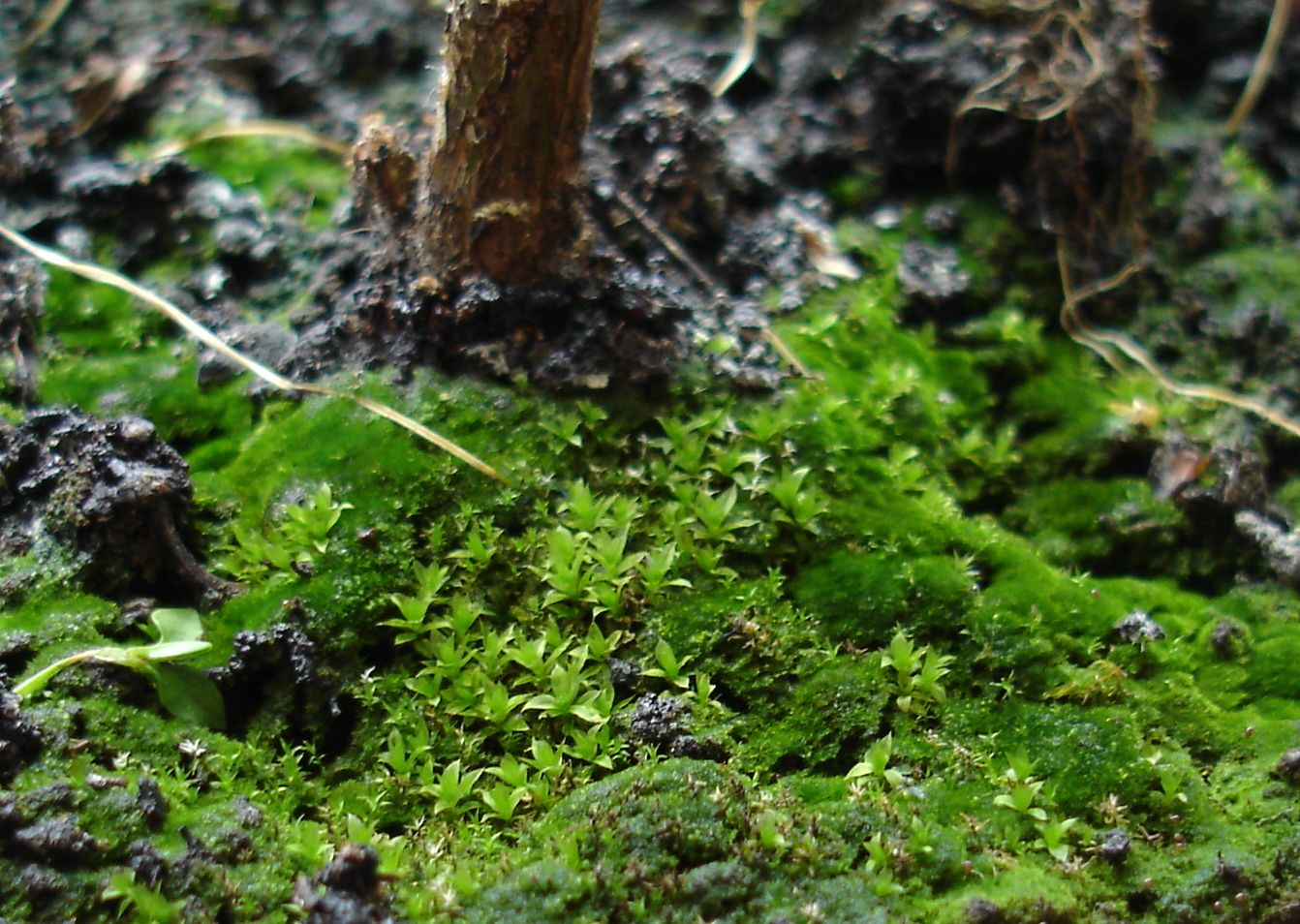
Moss layer on the forest floor

This layer contains mostly non-woody vegetation, or ground cover, growing in the forest with heights of up to about one and a half metres. The herb layer consists of various herbaceous plants (therophytes, geophytes, cryptophytes, hemicryptophytes), dwarf shrubs (chamaephytes) as well as young shrubs or tree seedlings. In forests, early flowering plants appear first before the canopy fills out. Thereafter, the amount of light available to plants is significantly reduced and only those that are suited to such conditions can thrive there. By contrast, grassland consists of only moss and herb layers. Sometimes, a shrub layer builds up in grasslands as part of a process of spontaneous reforestation (ecological succession).

=== Forest floor ===
The term forest floor can refer to the moss and root layers (see below), but often is defined more broadly, including also dead trees, herbaceous plants, mushrooms, and tree seedlings.

==== Moss layer ====
Growing on the surface of the forest floor is vegetation of up to about 0.15 metres in height in what is variously described as a moss, soil or cryptogam layer. The ground itself is covered by a layer of dead plant and animal material. In this layer and the underlying few centimetres of the topsoil live innumerable small soil organisms such as bacteria, fungi, algae and microorganisms, which break down the dead organic substances and work them into the soil. In places the ground is covered by lichens and mosses.

==== Root layer ====
Also known as the rhizosphere, the underground area of a plant habitat is the root layer. It consists of the plants' roots and related elements such as rhizomes, bulbs and tubers.

== See also ==
- Rainforest
- Agroforestry

== Bibliography ==
- Dierschke, Hartmut (1994). Pflanzensoziologie Grundlagen und Methoden; 55 Tabellen (in German). Stuttgart. ISBN 3-8252-8078-0. OCLC 231620702.
- C. S. Elton: Animal Ecology. Sidgwick & Jackson, London, 1927.
- M. Schaefer: Wörterbuch of the Ökologie. Spektrum, Jena, 1992. ISBN 3-8252-0430-8
