= Plant community =

Collection of native photosynthetic organisms

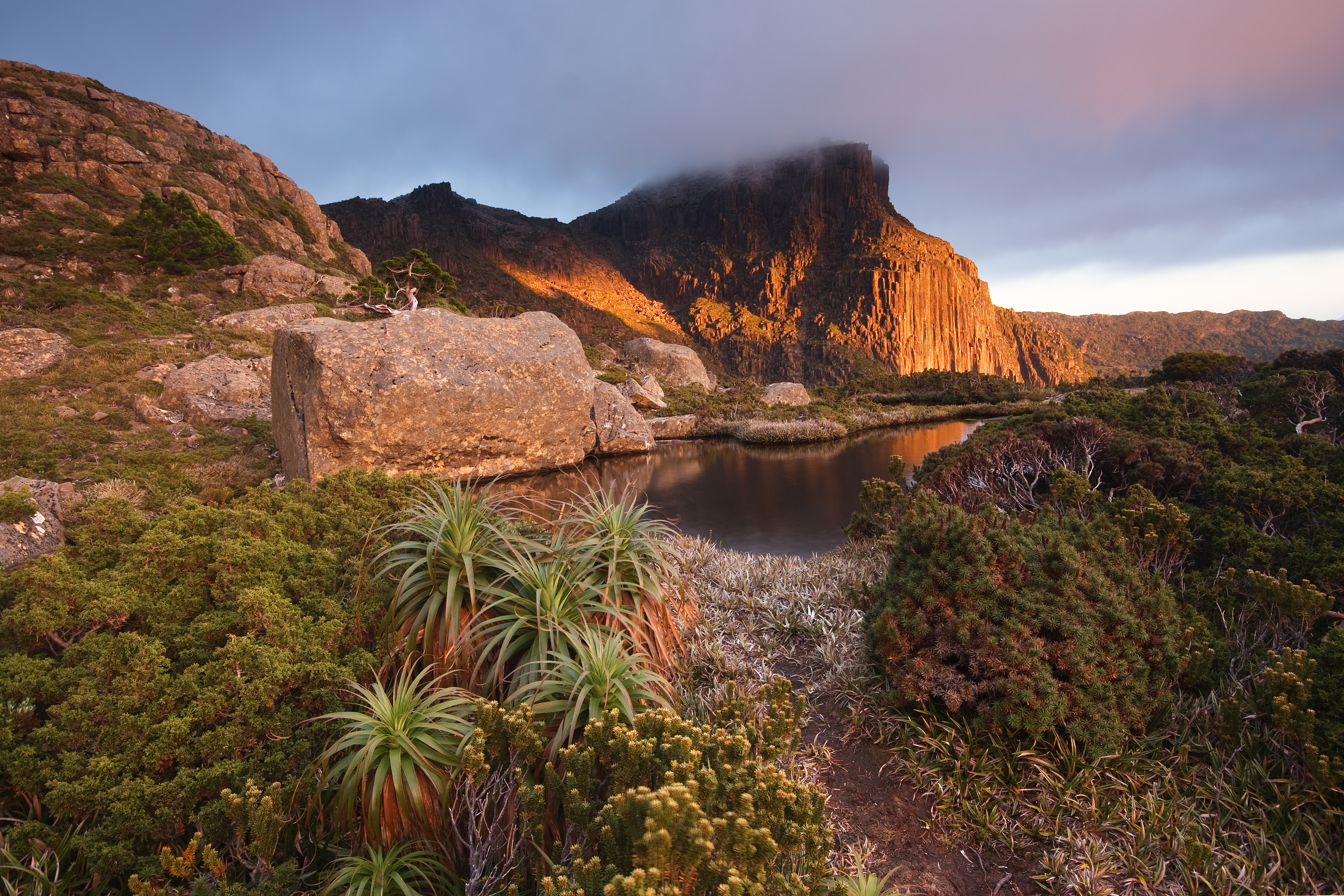
Alpine Heathland plant community at High Shelf Camp near Mount Anne, Tasmania, Australia

A plant community is a collection or association of plant species within a designated geographical unit, which forms a relatively uniform patch, distinguishable from neighboring patches of different vegetation types. The components of each plant community are influenced by soil type, topography, climate and disturbances. In many cases there are several soil types present within a given plant community. This is because the soil type within an area is influenced by two factors, the rate at which water infiltrates or exits (via evapotranspiration) the soil, as well as the rate at which organic matter (any carbon-based compound within the environment, such as decaying plant matter) enters or decays from the soil. Plant communities are studied substantially by ecologists, due to providing information on the effects of dispersal, tolerance to environmental conditions, and response to disturbance of a variety of plant species, information valuable to the comprehension of various plant community dynamics.

Plant communities having a stable composition after a relatively long period free of disturbance represent the potential natural vegetation, or “climax” plant community and are often called "Plant Associations." A Plant Association can be conceptual, and gives an indication of the direction of succession. In the United States, the Federal Geographic Data Committee (FGDC) reviews and approves a National Vegetation Classification Standard. Standards were developed by the Ecological Society of America’s Vegetation Classification Panel.

The USDA Forest Service collects field data, performs spatial statistics, and maps potential plant associations to assist in planting and restoration efforts. The US Bureau of Land Management also establishes plant communities using "Ecological Sites," which are roughly equivalent to plant associations.

== Definition ==
A plant community can be described floristically (the species of flowers or flora the plant community contains) and/or phytophysiognomically (the physical structure or appearance of the plant community). For example, a forest (a community of trees) includes the overstory, or upper tree layer of the canopy, as well as the understory, a layer consisting of trees and shrubs located beneath the canopy but above the forest floor. The understory can be further subdivided into the shrub layer, composed of vegetation and trees between a height of approximately one to five meters, the herbaceous layer, composed of vascular plants at a height of one meter or less, and sometimes also the moss layer, a layer of non-vascular bryophytes typically present at ground level (approximately 0.15 meters in height or less). In some cases of complex forests there is also a well-defined lower tree layer. A plant community is similar in concept to a vegetation type, with the former having more of an emphasis on the ecological association of species within it, and the latter on overall appearance by which it is readily recognized by a layperson.

A plant community can be rare even if none of the major species defining it are rare. This is because it is the association of species and relationship to their environment that may be rare. An example is the sycamore alluvial woodland in California dominated by the California sycamore Platanus racemosa. The community is rare, being localized to a small area of California and existing nowhere else, yet the California sycamore is not a rare tree in California.

== Examples ==
An example is a grassland on the northern Caucasus steppes, where common grass species found are Festuca rupicola and Poa bulbosa. The most common species defining this grassland phytocoenosis is Carex schreberi. Other representative forbs occurring in these steppe grasslands are Artemisia austriaca and Polygonum aviculare.

Other examples of different plant communities include the forests located on the granite peaks of the Huangshan Mountains in Eastern China. The deciduous broad-leaved forest, present from a height of 1,100 metres, is populated by trees such as Pinus hwangshanensis, also known as the Huangshan pine. The Huangshan mountain also possesses an evergreen broad-leaved forest community, home to a variety of shrubs and small trees. Some examples of species present in the evergreen broad-leaved forest community include Castanopsis eyrei, Eurya nitida, Rhododendron ovatum, Pinus massoniana, as well as Loropetalum chinense.

An example of a three tiered plant community is in central Westland in the South Island, New Zealand. These forests are the most extensive continuous reaches of podocarp/broadleaf forests in that country. The canopy includes miro, rimu and mountain tōtara. The mid-story includes tree ferns such as Alsophila smithii and Dicksonia squarrosa, whilst the lowest tier and epiphytic associates include Asplenium polyodon, Tmesipteris tannensis, Astelia solandri and Lomaria discolor.

== See also ==
- Community (ecology)
- Size-asymmetric competition
- Ecosystem
- Habitat
- Phytosociology
- Stand level modelling
- Vegetation classification
- Climax vegetation
- Potential natural vegetation
