= Sycamore Alluvial Woodland =

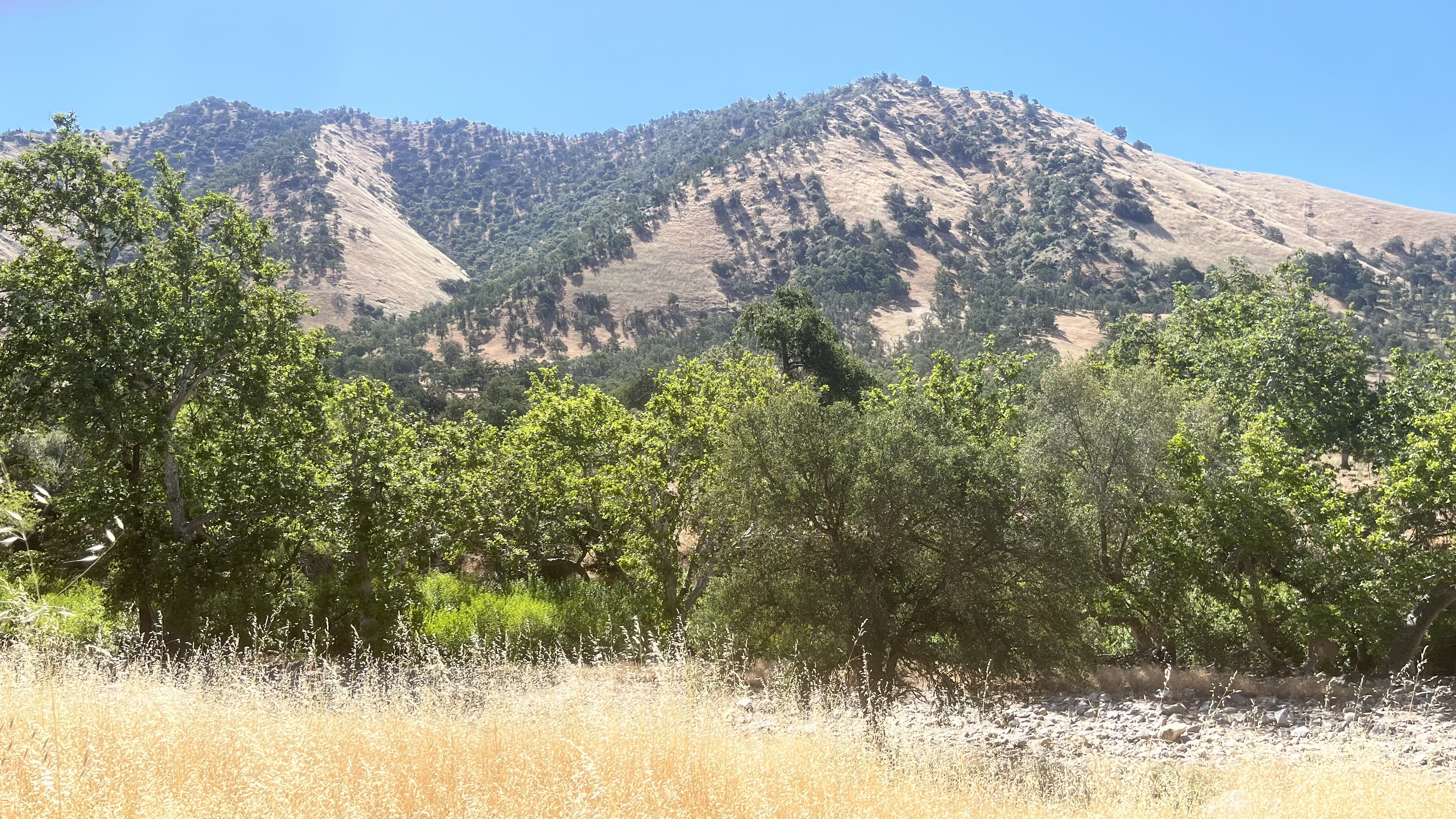
Sycamore Alluvial Woodland along Dry Creek in Tulare County, California. The Sycamores take advantage of the deep gravels and consistent, snow-fed flow from Dry Creek (May 27th, 2024)

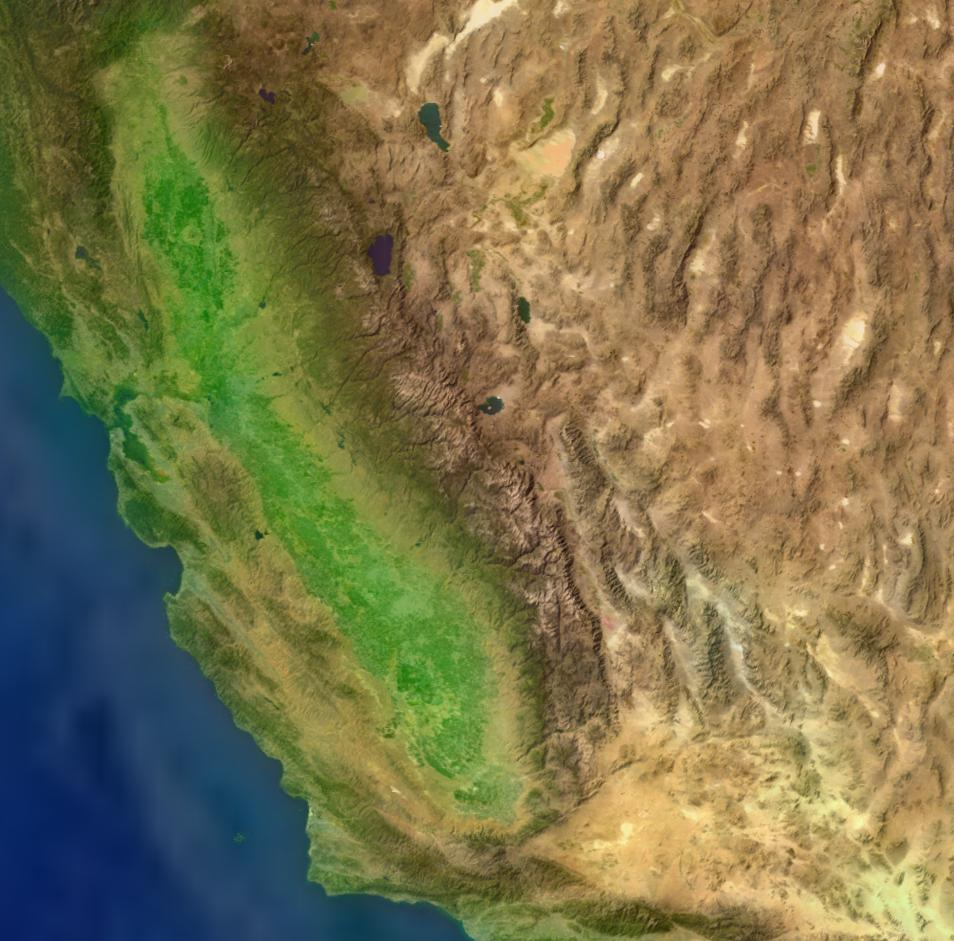
Sierra Nevada Region

Sycamore Alluvial Woodland is a rare open woodland plant community, or vegetation type, dominated by California sycamore Platanus racemosa, existing only in small parts of California. It exists only in small areas of California in the foothills of the southern Sierra Nevada range and the California Coastal Range. It is rare as a plant community, even though California sycamore is a common component of other vegetation types where it is not dominant. It exists at the base of flat valleys having deep alluvial gravel, where water from the hills hit the flat valley floor having an intermittent stream and large seasonal fluctuations in the water table. It is a habitat type defined by broad-leafed woodland and stable levels of groundwater. Sycamore Alluvial Woodland is identifiable through open savanna riparian structures, with wide floodplains.

== Geography ==
Loss of habitat over the past two centuries has greatly limited the ability of sycamore alluvial woodlands to distribute and regenerate. Changes in sediment and flow levels due to dams have likely caused its diminishing presence. Only 17 habitats have been mapped along streams in California with a total recorded area of 2000 acres. Due to its rarity and its susceptibility to influence by human modifications, Sycamore Alluvial Woodland is a priority for many conservationists.

== Ecology ==
=== Fauna ===
Sycamore Alluvial Woodlands are home to a variety of vulnerable wildlife species, such as Actinemys marmorata (Western Pond Turtles) and Oncorhynchus mykiss (Rainbow Trout). These habitats provide adequate nesting and roosting conditions for a plethora of bird species and additionally providing large quantities of insect and seed due to significant amounts of dead wood that make it a preferred habitat for bird diets.
