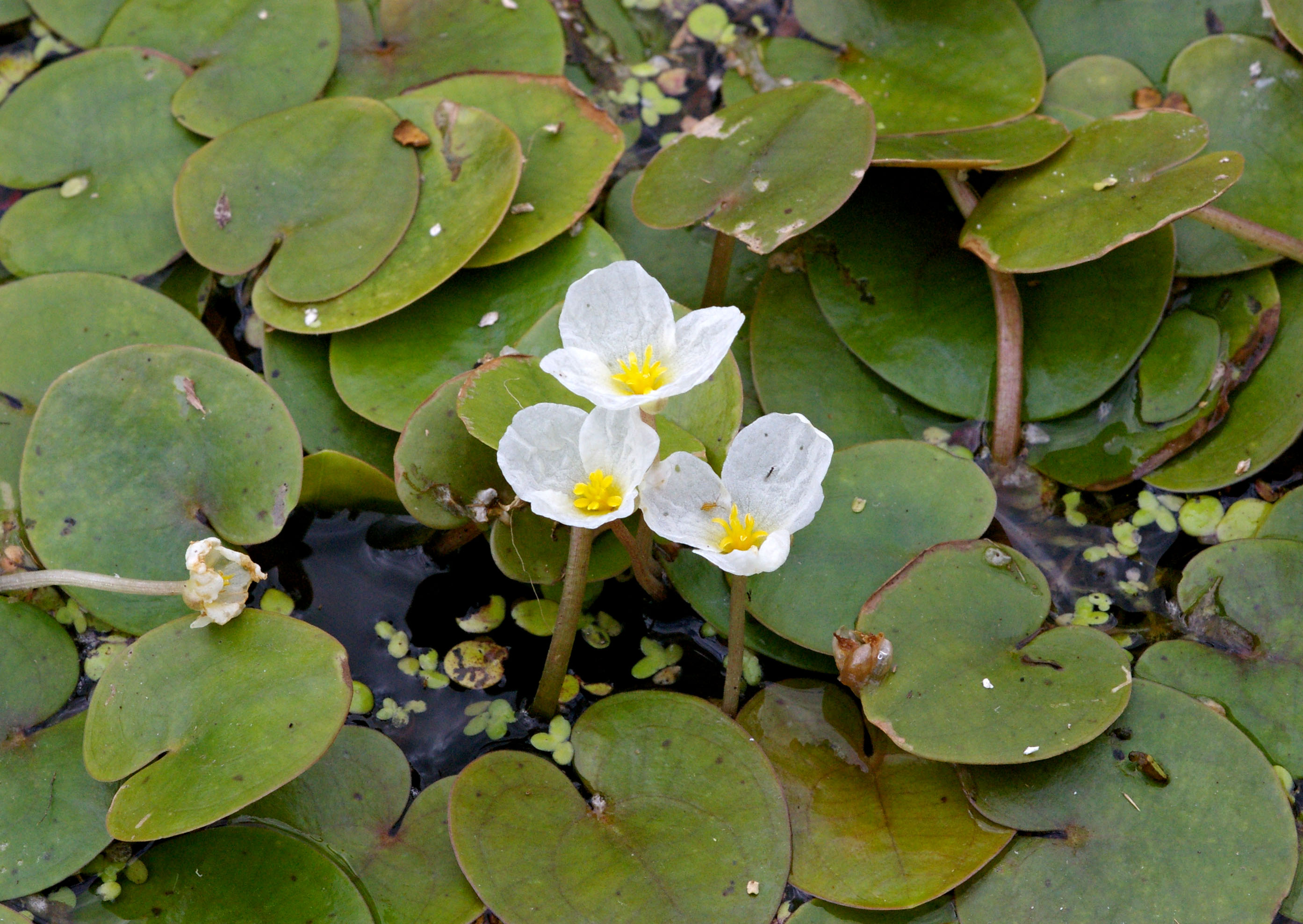
- Hydrocharis morsus-ranae

Scientific classification
- Kingdom: Plantae
- Clade: Tracheophytes
- Clade: Angiosperms
- Clade: Monocots
- Order: Alismatales
- Family: Hydrocharitaceae
- Subfamily: Hydrocharitoideae
- Genus: Hydrocharis; L.

Type species
- Hydrocharis morsus-ranae L.

Synonyms
- Hydrocharella Spruce ex Benth. & Hook.f.; Hydromystria G.Mey.; Jalambicea (Cerv.) Cerv.; Limnobium Rich.; Rhizakenia Raf.; Trianea H.Karst.

= Hydrocharis =

Frogbit

Genus of aquatic plants

Hydrocharis is a genus of aquatic plants in the family Hydrocharitaceae described as a genus by Carl Linnaeus in 1753. Species range across much of Europe and Asia, northwestern and central Africa, New Guinea, and the Americas from the eastern and central United States to Argentina and Chile. Species are naturalized in parts of California, northeastern North America, southern tropical Africa, and Australia.

The best known species is Hydrocharis morsus-ranae, commonly called common frogbit or European frog's-bit, and occasionally water-poppy.

== Species ==
Five species are accepted.

- Hydrocharis chevalieri (De Wild.) Dandy – Benin, Cameroon, Gabon, Central African Republic, Republic of the Congo, Democratic Republic of the Congo
- Hydrocharis dubia (Blume) Backer – Primorsky Krai, China, Japan, Korea, Indian subcontinent, SE Asia, New Guinea
- Hydrocharis laevigata (Humb. & Bonpl. ex Willd.) Byng & Christenh. – smooth or South American frogbit; Mexico through Central and South America to Argentina and Chile
- Hydrocharis morsus-ranae L. – common or European frogbit; Europe, Siberia, North Africa, Turkey, Caucasus, Kazakhstan
- Hydrocharis spongia Bosc – American frogbit; central and eastern United States
