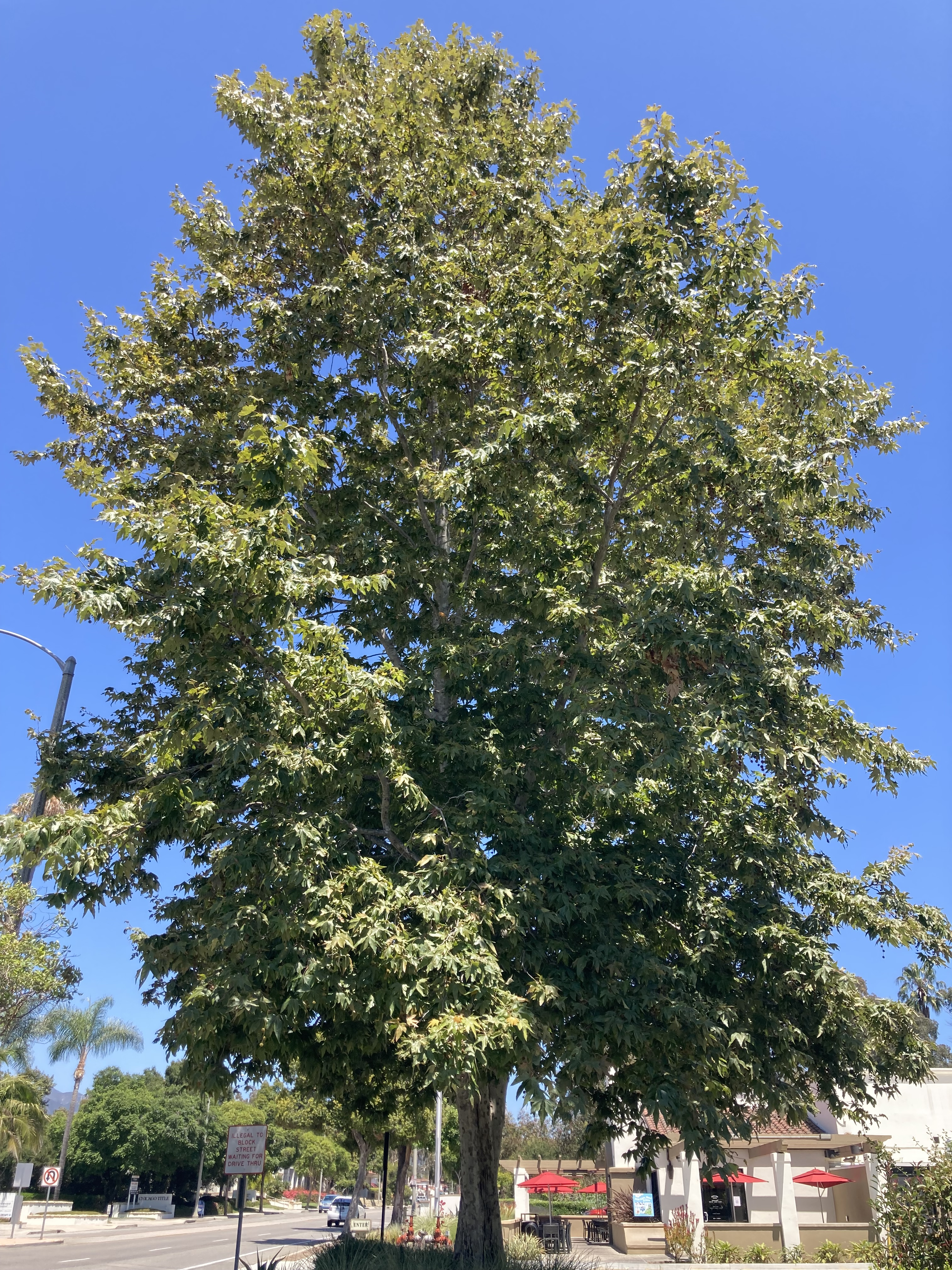
- California Sycamore

Scientific classification
- Kingdom: Plantae
- Clade: Embryophytes
- Clade: Tracheophytes
- Clade: Spermatophytes
- Clade: Angiosperms
- Clade: Eudicots
- Order: Proteales
- Family: Platanaceae
- Genus: Platanus
- Species: P. racemosa

Binomial name
- Platanus racemosa Nutt.
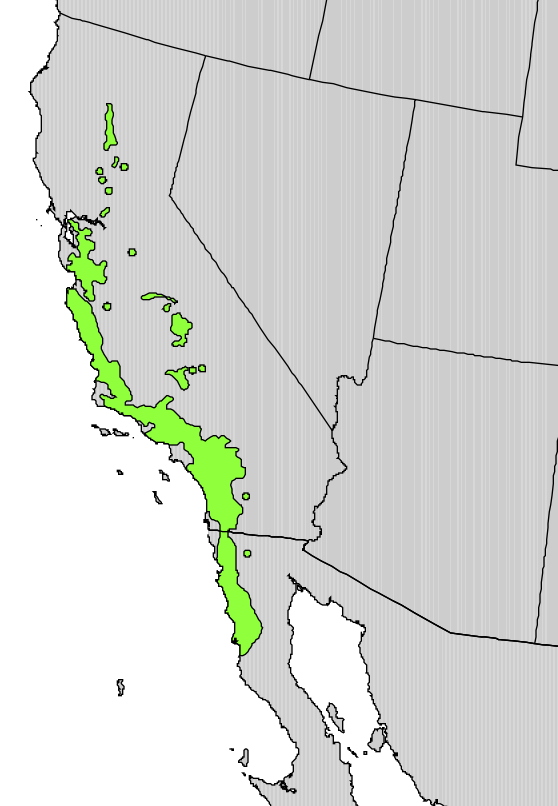
- Natural range

= Platanus racemosa =

Species of tree

Platanus racemosa is a species of plane tree known by several common names, including California sycamore, western sycamore, California plane tree, and in North American Spanish aliso. Platanus racemosa is native to California and Baja California, where it grows in riparian areas, canyons, floodplains, at springs and seeps, and along streams and rivers in several types of habitats. It can be found as far north as Tehama and Humboldt counties.

== Description ==
This large tree grows to 35 meters (110 ft) in height with a trunk diameter of up to one meter (three feet). The height of these trees ranges from 10 to 35 meters (33 to 115 ft). A specimen on the campus of Stanford University has a trunk girth (circumference) of 10.5 feet (3.20 m). The trunk generally divides into two or more large trunks splitting into many branches. The bark is an attractive patchwork of white, tawny beige, pinkish gray, and pale brown. Both older bark and twigs on this plane sycamore become darker with time. The twigs and bark range from a light brownish gray to a shade resembling the color sepia.

Platanus racemosa is the dominant species in the globally and state endangered sycamore-alluvial woodland habitat.

The large palmately lobed leaves may be up to 25 centimetres (9.8 in) centimeters wide and have three or five pointed lobes. New leaves are a bright translucent green and somewhat woolly. The deciduous tree drops copious amounts of dry golden to orangish red leaves in the fall. The inflorescence is made up of a few spherical flower heads each around a centimeter wide. The female flower heads develop into spherical fruit clusters each made up of many hairy, maroon-red-woolly achenes. Depending on the sex, the inflorescence can either be red, if female, or chartreuse, if male. After the female clusters fertilize, the achenes bear a fruit that breaks apart and scatters just as the tree's pollen does.

The tough and coarse-grained wood is difficult to split and work. It has various uses, including acting as a meat preparation block for butchers. Many small birds feed on its fruit, and several mammals eat its twigs and bark. The pollen resulting from the hairs on the leaves and flowers of Western sycamores can be allergens for some people. New leaves are susceptible to anthracnose canker, which, when it causes a side bud to become the new leader, can create picturesque angling trunks and branches on older specimens.

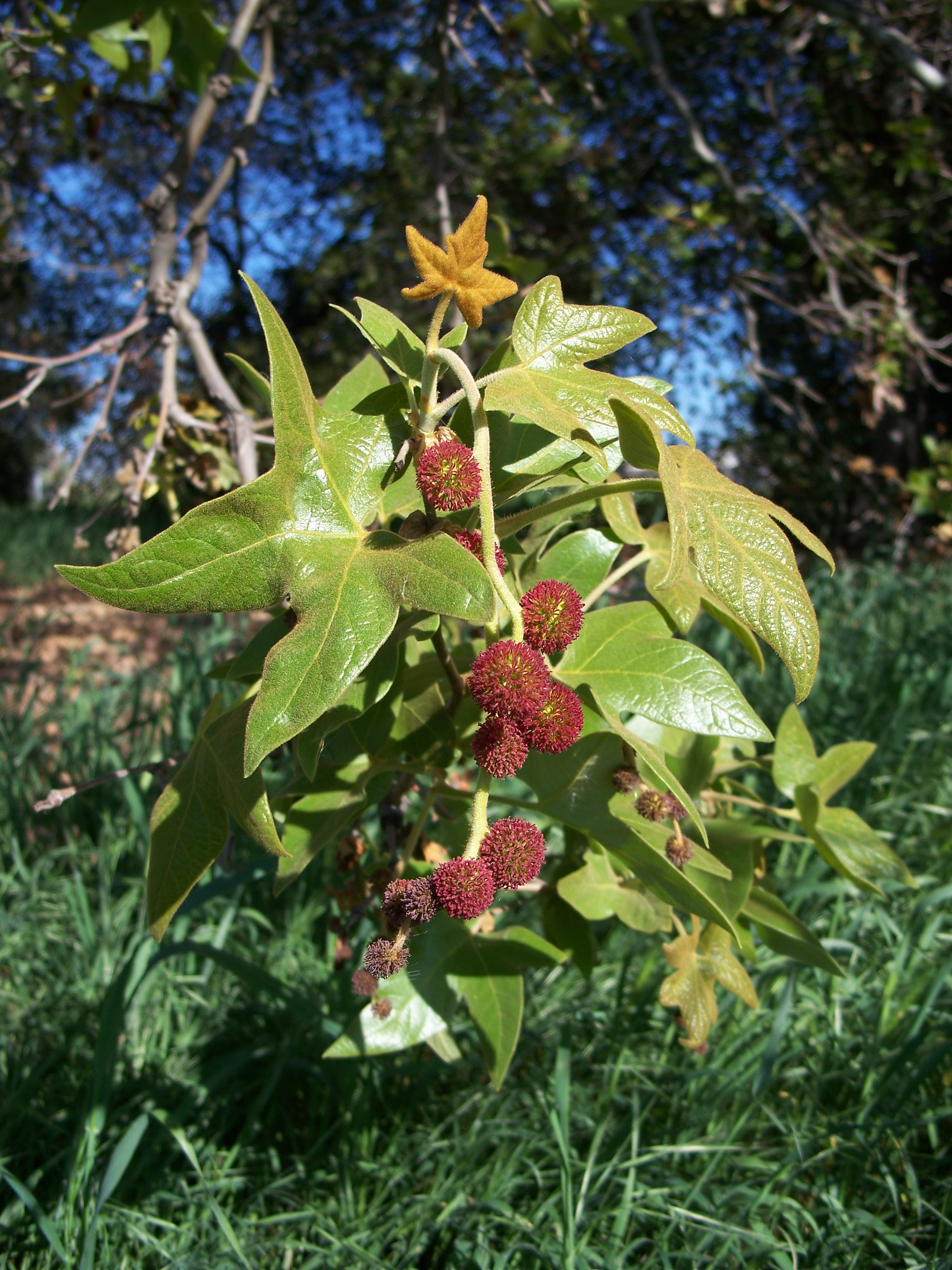
Flower heads and newly emerging leaves

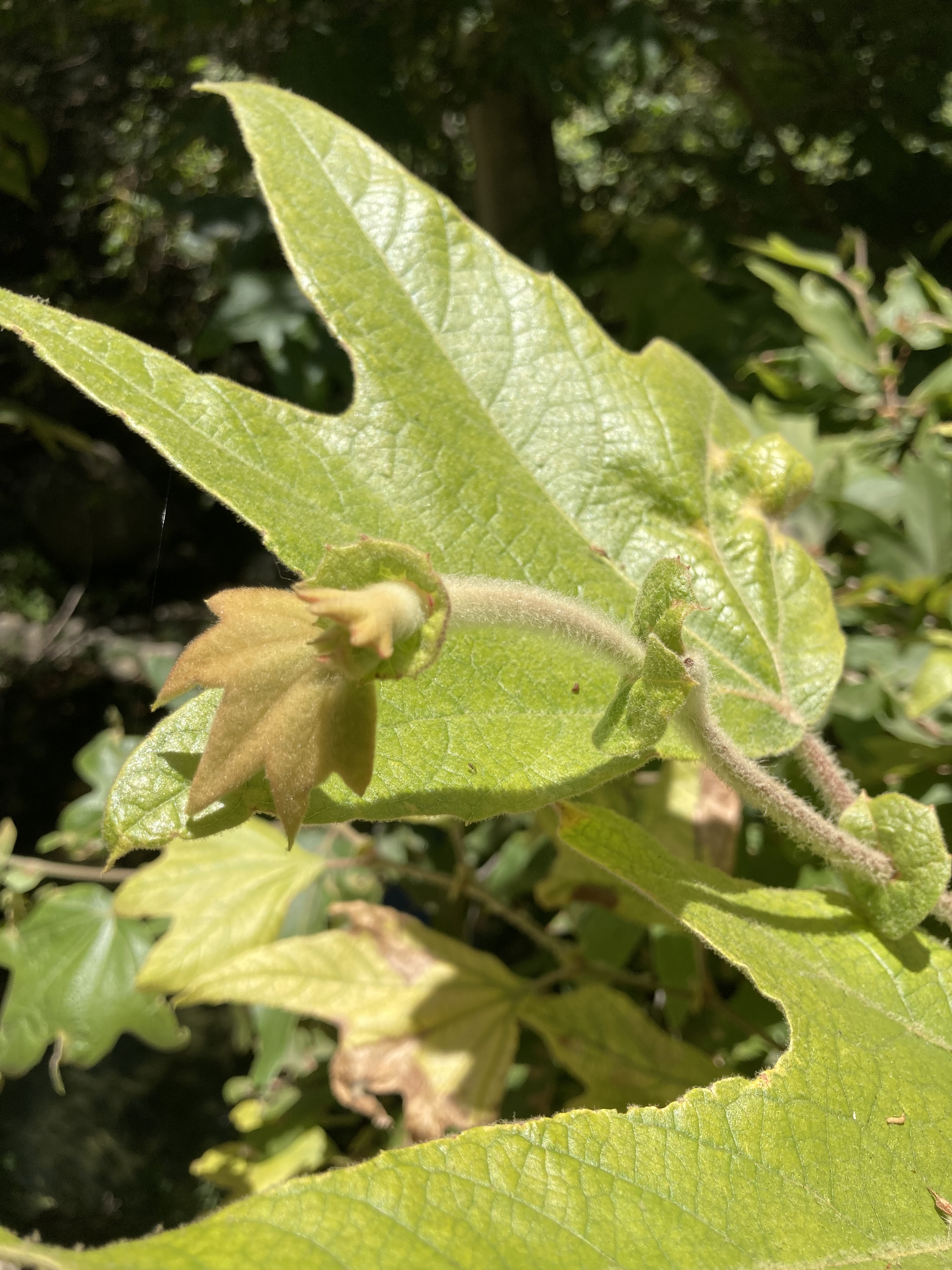
Densely pubescent new leaves and petioles

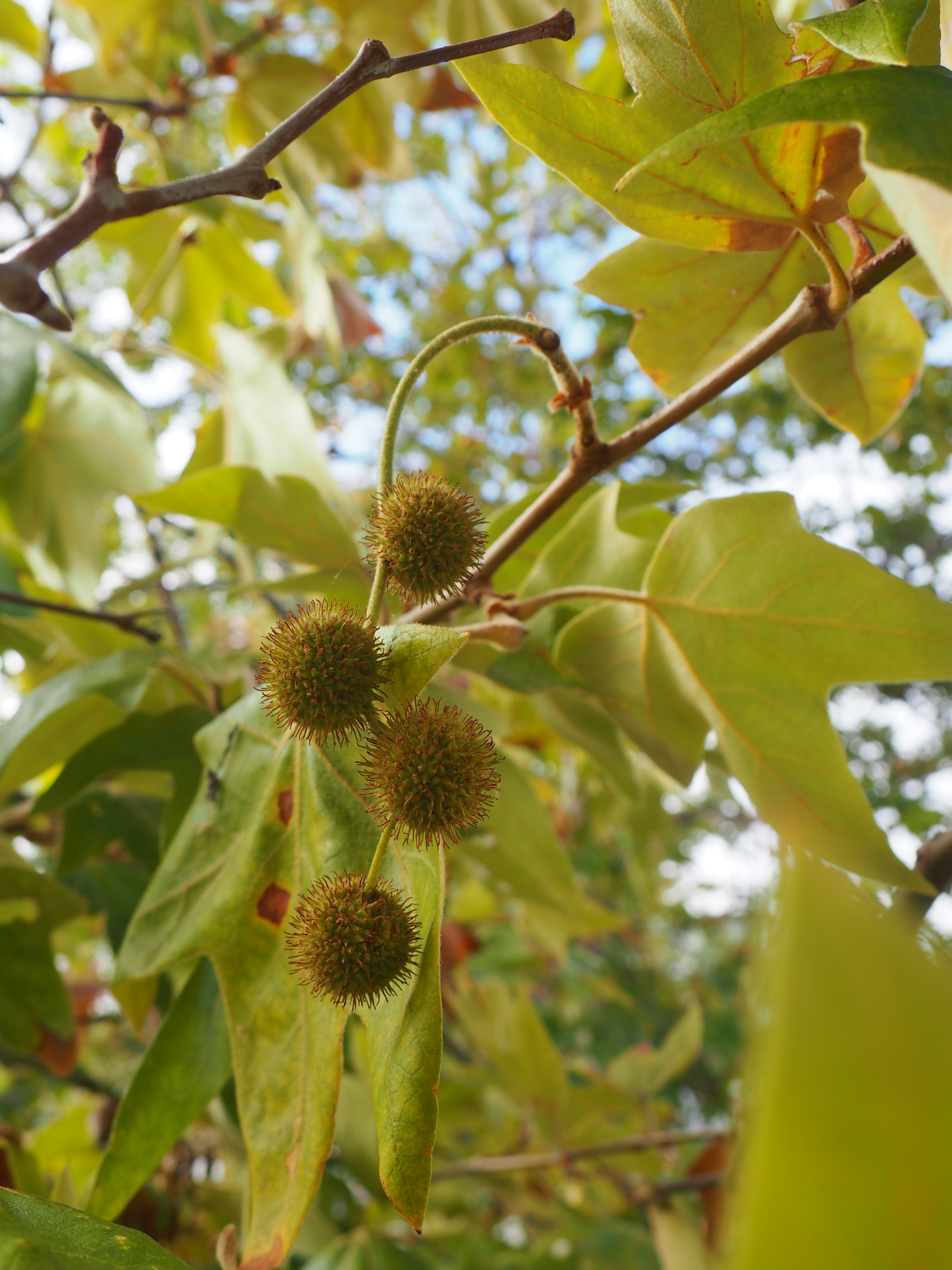
Developing infructescence of Platanus racemosa

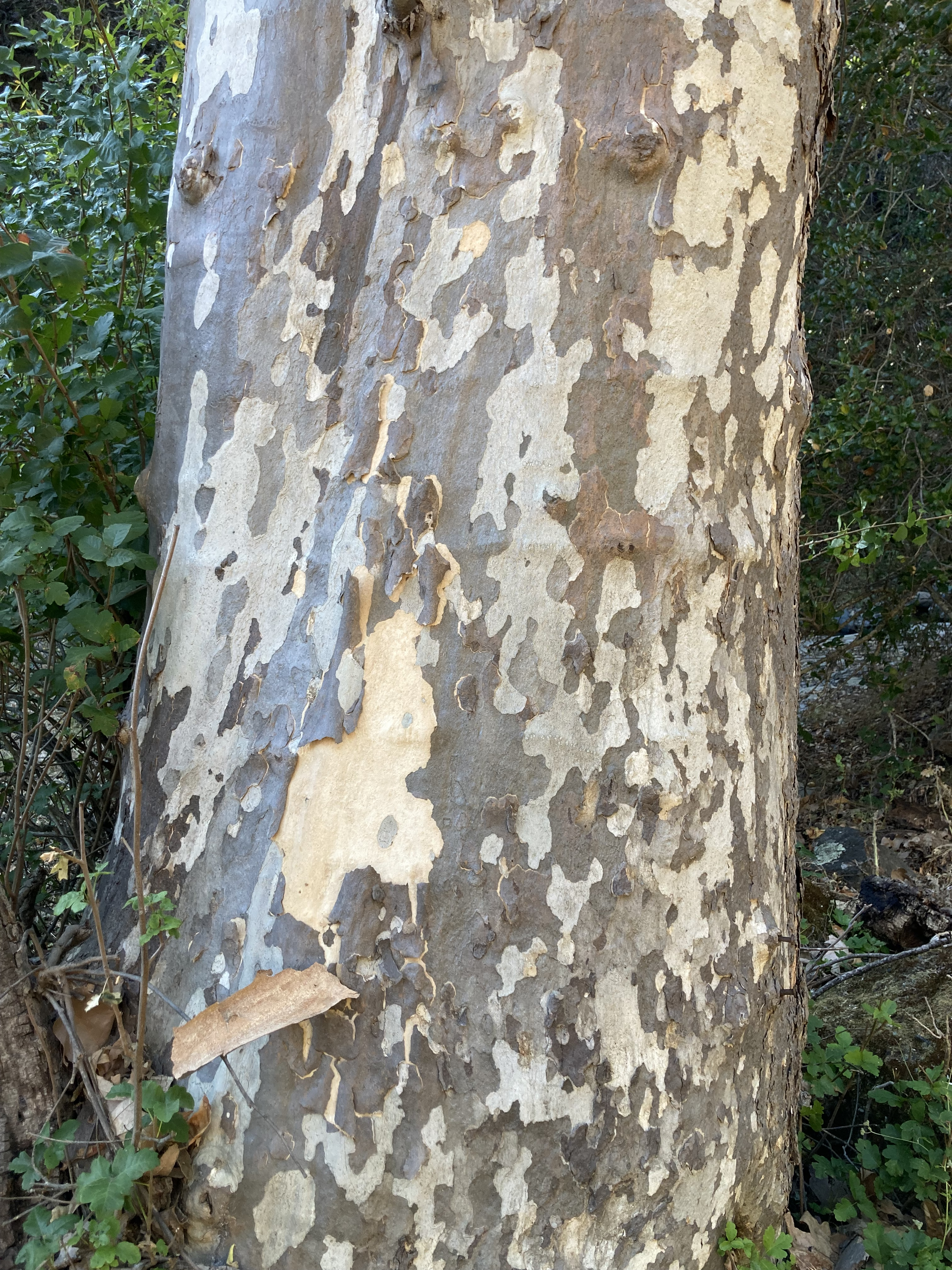
Mottled, exfoliating bark of a mature tree

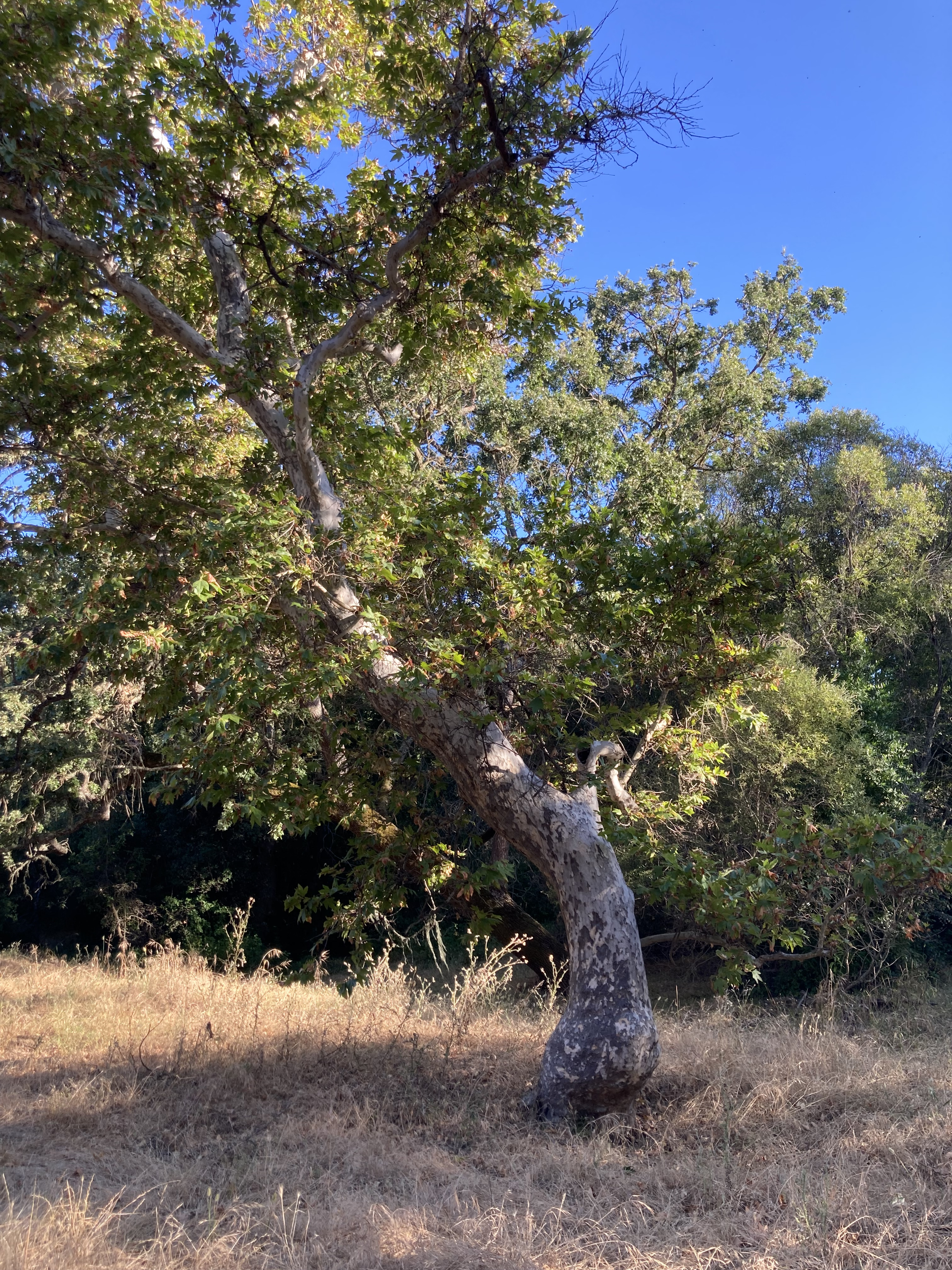
Contorted trunk and leaning habit of a mature specimen

== Cultivation ==
It is also widely planted horticulturally as a landscape tree in public landscapes and private gardens. While it requires some water, and can be grown in lawns, once established it is drought tolerant. New appreciation for how it shades sun in summer and lets sun through in winter has led to its use in green architecture and sustainable design.

== Uses ==
California sycamore wood is extremely hard and difficult to work, but can still be employed to create a variety of items such as buttons, tobacco boxes, furniture, wooden utensils, and barrels. The form and wide canopy of the species make it an effective shade tree. This western sycamore's shade cools the surrounding bodies of water while simultaneously offering a home for some animals in the humid environment in which it flourishes. The Native Tongva people call the tree Shavar, and teas prepared from its bark were traditionally used as a blood tonic, a remedy for asthma, and an aid during childbirth.

== Ecology ==
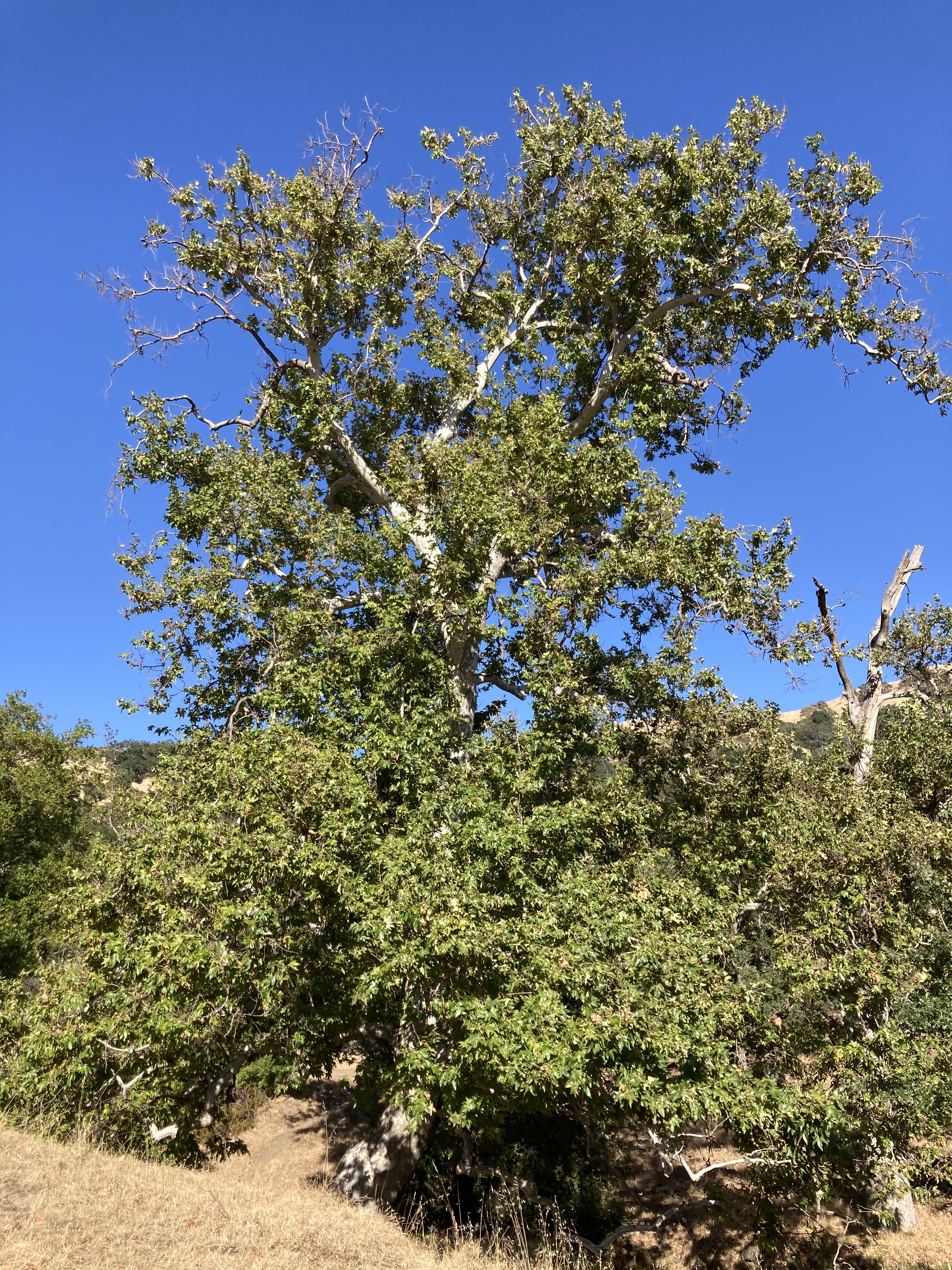
Wild California sycamore at Sunol Regional Wilderness

Increased human interference has made P. racemosa more susceptible to cross-breeding with other Platanus species. This hybridization with other species like P. x hispanica offers P. racemosa the advantage of resisting fungal diseases, namely sycamore anthracnose. Interbred California sycamores are less vulnerable to this disease than the original P. racemosa as it harms their wood. However, sycamore anthracnose produces deadwood which creates a habitat for animals like wood ducks. The lack of non-hybridized P. racemosa thus harms the riparian woodlands in which they thrive.

Another disease that P. racemosa is particularly receptive to is Fusarium dieback which is carried and passed on through two kinds of invasive ambrosia beetles. Removing the tree itself is one way to prevent the significant harms of Fusarium dieback from spreading but a mixture of fungicides such as metconazole combined with an insecticide can additionally reduce the number of ambrosia beetles that transmit this disease. Close monitoring is required in order to prevent a substantial beetle infestation from occurring as that would damage the tree to the point of needing removal.

Further hybridization between P. racemosa and P. x hispanica are a threat to the genetic diversity and identity of the former. The disease combatant advantage that the hybrid provides can bring about a decline in the native tree. The ensuing decline and genetic disintegration could not only harm the tree itself, but nesting birds, monarch butterflies, and numerous other small animals that reside or find shelter within the California sycamore's shade. D. Whitlock's study on the RNA of the Platanus trees near the Sacramento River reveals that P. racemosa contains genes from P. x hispanica, which consequently demonstrates the increased erasure of the former.

== See also ==
- Big Sycamore Canyon - a place in Ventura County, California with a population of California sycamore trees
