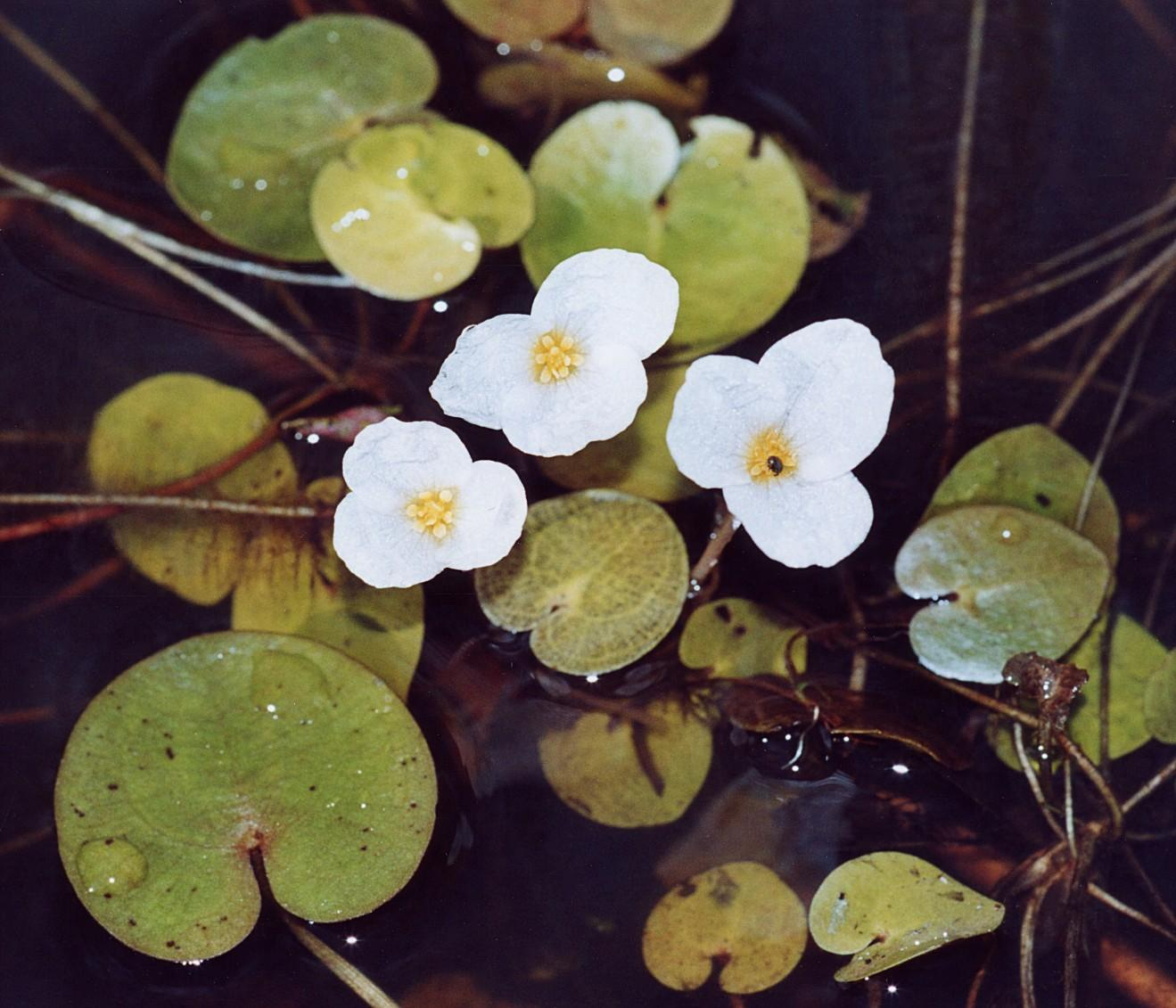

Conservation status
- Least Concern (IUCN 3.1)

Scientific classification
- Kingdom: Plantae
- Clade: Tracheophytes
- Clade: Angiosperms
- Clade: Monocots
- Order: Alismatales
- Family: Hydrocharitaceae
- Genus: Hydrocharis
- Species: H. morsus-ranae

Binomial name
- Hydrocharis morsus-ranae L.

= Hydrocharis morsus-ranae =

Species of flowering plant

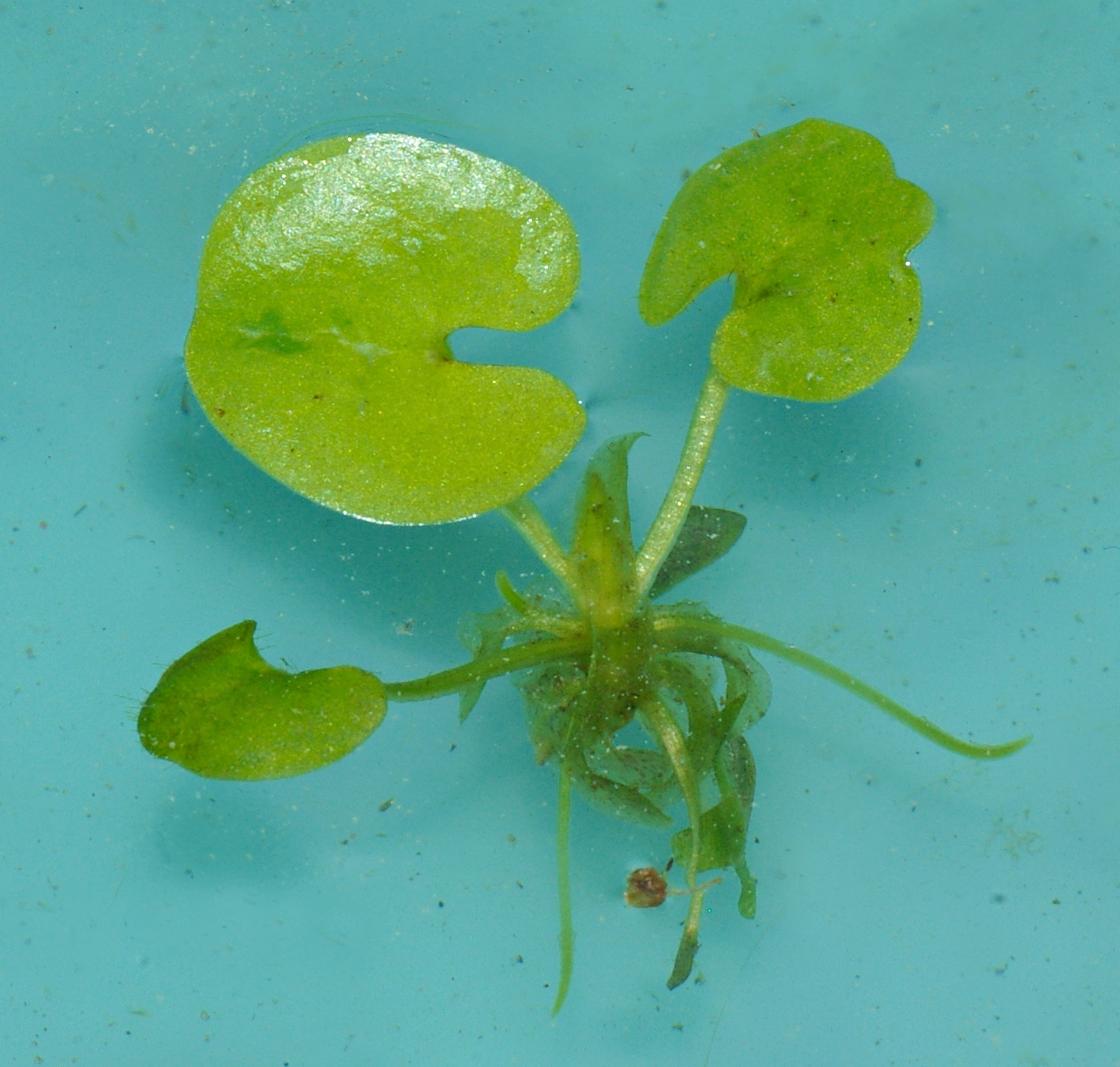
Young Hydrocharis morsus-ranae plant

Hydrocharis morsus-ranae L. is a species of the genus Hydrocharis known by the common name European frog-bit. It is a free-floating flowering plant that bears small white flowers. "Morsus-ranae" means "frog bite" in Latin, and it is part of this species's scientific name because frogs might have been seen as biting on the leaves. European frog-bit is often mistaken for an American frog-bit (Limnobium spongia) due to their similar looks and floating freely. It usually displays invasive behavior in Canada and North America, having a major impact on native ecosystems. However, European frog-bit is efficient in accumulating high concentrations of heavy metals and chemicals, removing waste from water.

== Description ==
Hydrocharis morsus-ranae is a perennial plant with a stoloniferous growth, reaching a diameter of 0.1 to 1.5 meters. It forms individual rosettes ranging from 1 to 30cm. While mainly having separate male and female plants, it sometimes shows both sexes on different shoots within a group of plants (genet) rather than within the same rosette. The plant has unbranched white roots that extend up to 50cm and have numerous extended root hairs. The circular floating leaves display visible aerenchyma on the undersurface. The slender petioles, 6–14cm, have two free lateral stipules at the base.

=== Flower ===
The flowers of Hydrocharis morsus-ranae have unique features. They are either male or female, and both types are symmetrical and attract insects for pollination. The male flowers are grouped in a certain way, with 2-5 buds covered by two protective leaves. These leaves support the first two blooming flowers. In contrast, female flowers always grow alone and are surrounded by a single tubular structure. Both male and female flowers have three greenish-red sepals and white petals. Importantly, all other reproductive parts in these flowers are bright yellow.

== Habitat and Distribution ==
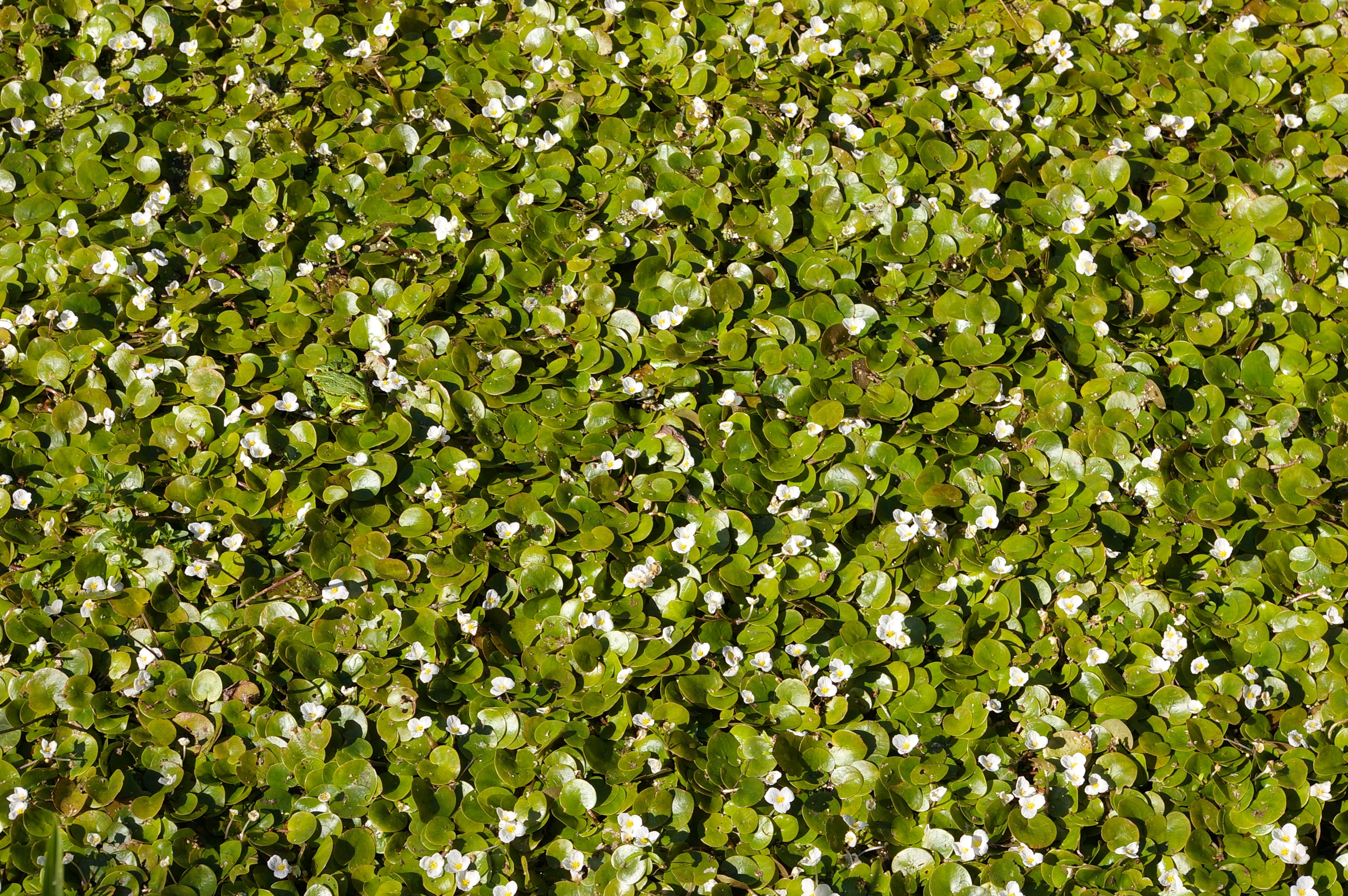
Mass development of European frog-bit

Hydrocharis morsus-ranae is native to Europe and Asia and found in slow-flowing rivers, stagnant waters, aquatic ditches, and oxbow lakes. It was initially introduced to Canada and North America in 1932 and has become invasive in eastern Canada and some northern states of the United States. European frog-bit is considered a pest in these regions as it colonizes waterways and forms dense masses of vegetation on the surface, threatening native biodiversity. Thus, it is prohibited to trade or transport this plant in states such as Washington and Minnesota.

== Environmental Benefit ==
Hydrocharis morsus-ranae tends to accumulate more metals in its organ when it grows near factories compared to farms or recreational areas. The plant naturally has high amounts of certain metals like potassium, cobalt, iron, and nitrogen, regardless of where it grows. The researchers discovered that the plant is good at absorbing and storing specific metals, making it a potential candidate for cleaning up water pollution. However, more research is needed to find the best conditions for its growth and make sure too many metals won't harm the plant.
