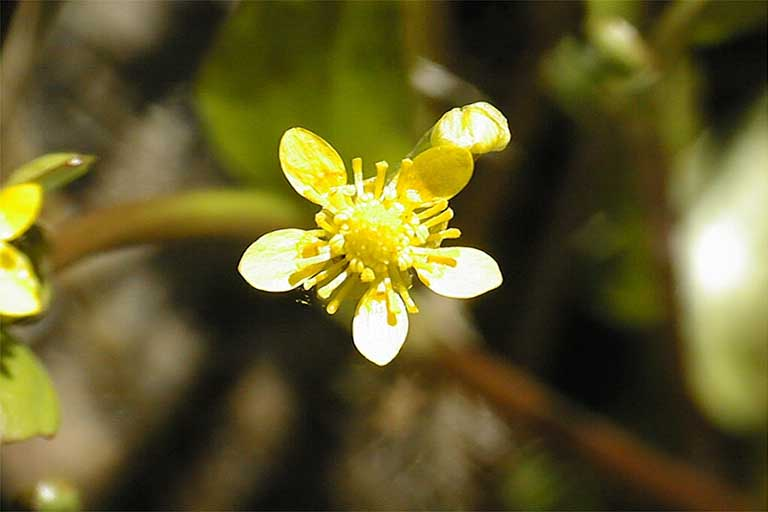

Scientific classification
- Kingdom: Plantae
- Clade: Tracheophytes
- Clade: Angiosperms
- Clade: Eudicots
- Order: Ranunculales
- Family: Ranunculaceae
- Genus: Ranunculus
- Species: R. hydrocharoides

Binomial name
- Ranunculus hydrocharoides A.Gray

= Ranunculus hydrocharoides =

Species of buttercup

Ranunculus hydrocharoides is a species of buttercup known by the common names frogbit buttercup, or frog's-bit buttercup. It is native to western North America, including the southwestern United States and Mexico. It is also known from Guatemala. It is aquatic or semi-aquatic, growing floating in water or in wet land near water. Typical habitat includes marshes, streams, and lakes. Stems are up to 25 centimeters long, prostrate on the ground when terrestrial, or floating when aquatic. The shiny green leaves have heart-shaped or oval blades up to 3 centimeters long which are borne on petioles which may be 15 centimeters in length. Flowers have 5 to 8 shiny yellow petals a few millimeters long with many stamens and pistils at the center. The fruit is an achene borne in a spherical cluster of 9 or more.
