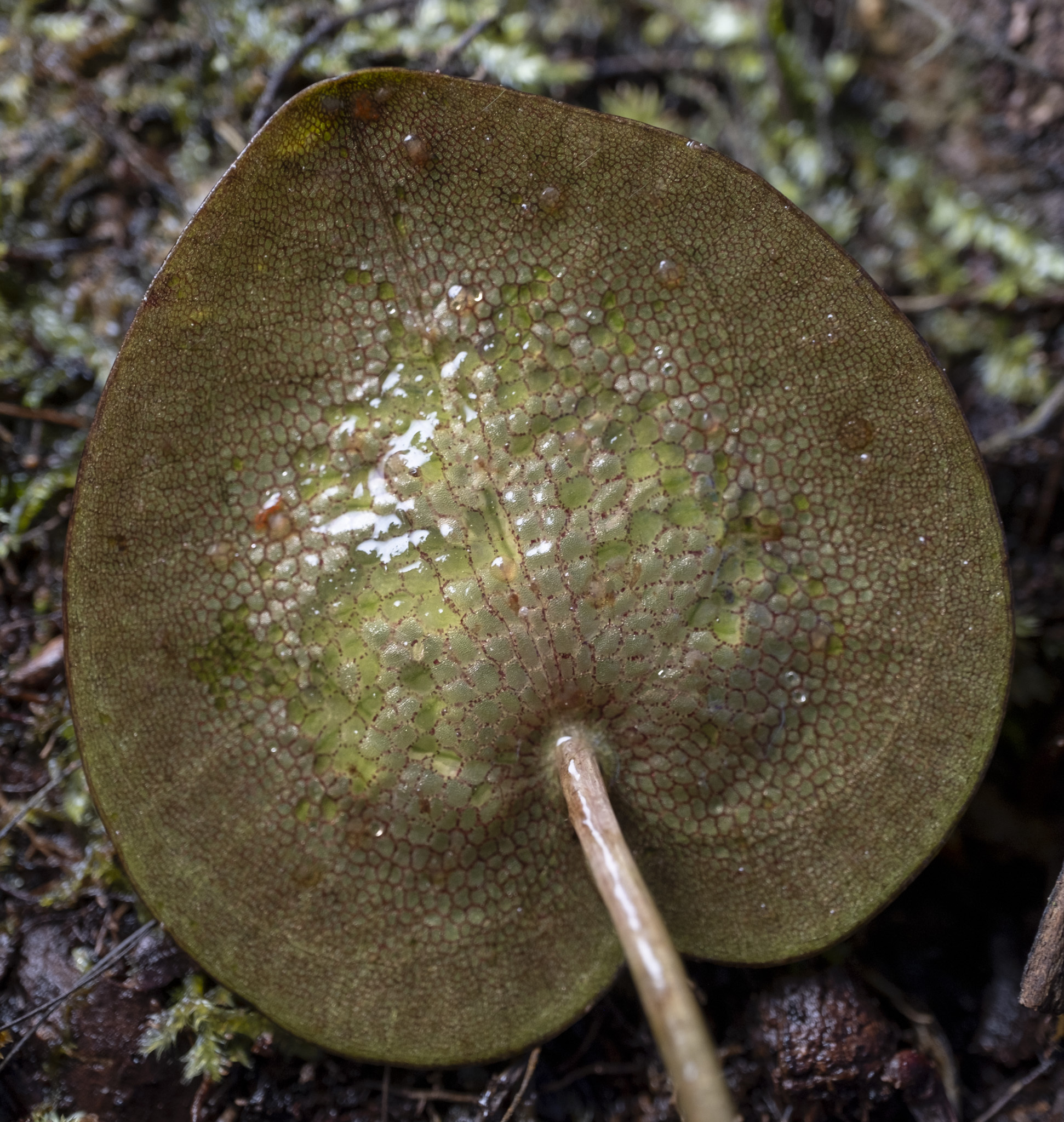
- Spongy aerenchyma tissue

Scientific classification
- Kingdom: Plantae
- Clade: Tracheophytes
- Clade: Angiosperms
- Clade: Monocots
- Order: Alismatales
- Family: Hydrocharitaceae
- Genus: Hydrocharis
- Species: H. spongia

Binomial name
- Hydrocharis spongia Bosc

Synonyms
- Hydrocharis cordifolia Nutt., nom. superfl.; Limnobium boscii Rich., nom. superfl.; Limnobium spongia (Bosc) Steud.; Rhizakenia ovata Raf.

= Hydrocharis spongia =

Species of flowering plant

Hydrocharis spongia, also known as Limnobium spongia, and commonly known as the American frogbit or the American spongeplant, is a species of flowering plant in the family Hydrocharitaceae. It is native to the central and southeastern United States, where it grows in the Lower Mississippi Valley as far north as Illinois, and on the Southern Coastal Plain from Texas to Delaware. It is occasionally found elsewhere as a waif. It grows in the slow-moving water of streams, bayous, and lakes from sea level up to 100 meters elevation.

== Description ==
The plants are herbaceous, growing up to 50 cm long. Heart-shaped or nearly rounded leaves are floating or emersed, 1–3 in (2–7 cm) in diameter. The leaves have two forms, often on the same plant. Floating leaves have a thick layer of spongy aerenchyma on the underside, while the emerged leaves lack the aerenchyma. Plants are mostly dioecious and sometimes monoecious and flower in summer and fall, mostly on plants with emersed leaves. Fruits are 4 to 12 mm diameter form from pistillate flowers, and once pollinated the peduncle becomes recurved to push the developing fruit below the water surface.

== Distribution ==
The native range of Hydrocharis spongia is predominantly the southeastern United States, with it specifically being present in: Texas, Louisiana, Oklahoma, Arkansas, Missouri, Illinois, Indiana, Kentucky, Tennessee, Mississippi, Alabama, Georgia, Florida, North Carolina, South Carolina, Virginia, Delaware, Maryland, New Jersey, New York, and Connecticut. It is sometimes rare in the northeastern areas of its native range, such as Illinois. Its preferred habitat include sloughs, ditches, swampy forests, in slow-moving or stagnant water with muddy substrate.

== Identification ==
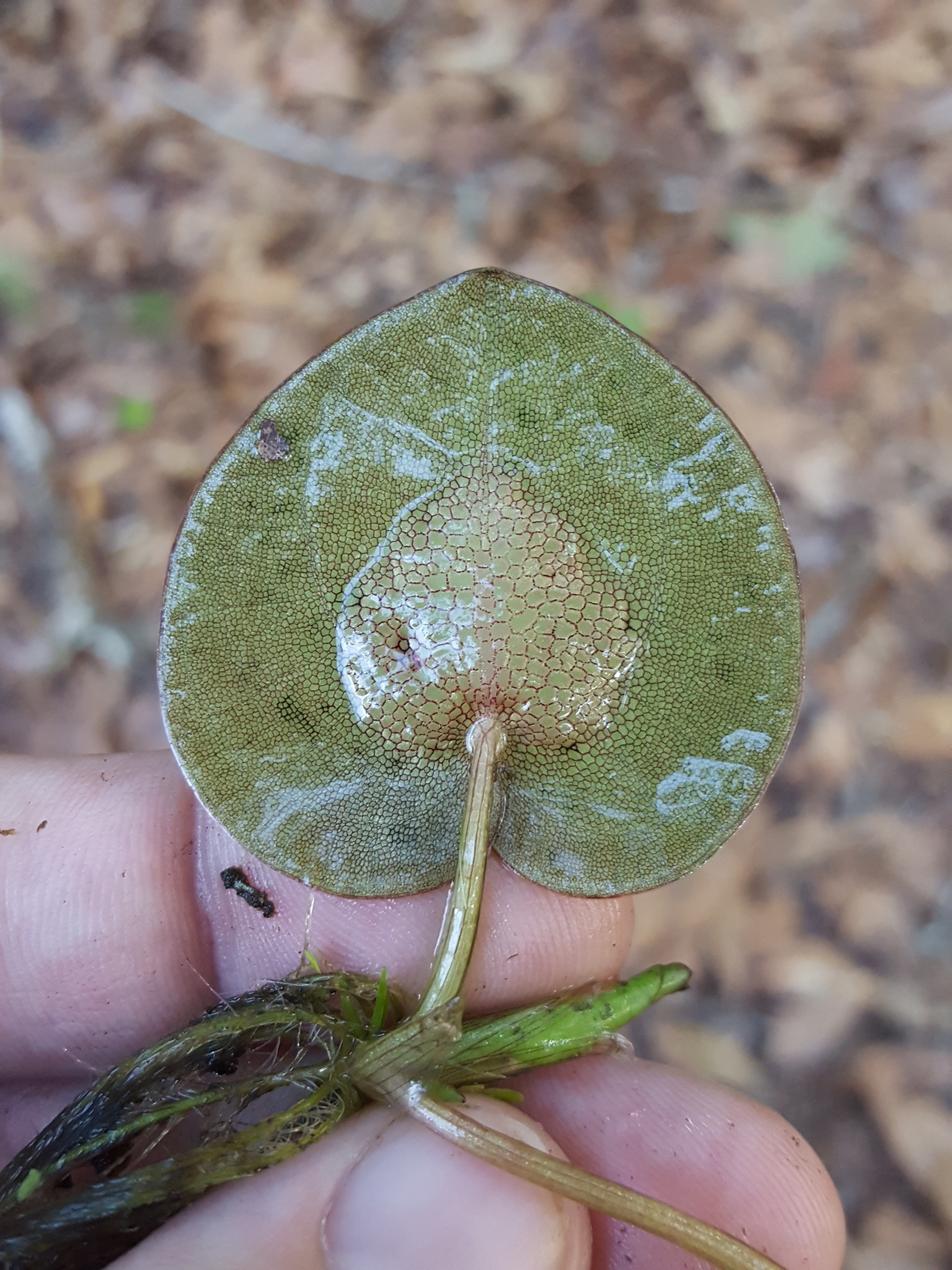
Image showing signature whitish stems

Hydrocharis spongia can be confused with Pontederia crassipes (formerly Eichhornia crassipes), commonly known as the Common Water Hyacinth. They key feature to look out when determining the difference between the two is the root color. American Frogbit will have whitish roots and stems, whereas Common Water Hyacinth with have darkly colored roots and stems. Some other key features are that American Frogbit has ridged leaf stalks, and the undersides of young leaves have a central disk of red spongy cells, which helps to distinguish it from European Frogbit.

== Ecology ==
The roots of Hydrocharis spongia are known habitats for various zooplankton species to use in order to disperse their resting stages. American Frogbit is also important habitat for various mosquito species, especially those in the genus Mansonia. One particularly infamous mosquito species is Anopheles quadrimaculatus, also known as the Common Malaria Mosquito. The sugar in American Frog-bit is a known food source of the Common Malaria Mosquito, so a test was undertaken to determine if sugar traps with boric acid could be used with these plants along with two others that these mosquitoes also feed on the sugar of. The test ultimately concluded that American Frog-bit had performed the worst out of the three.

== Environmental concerns ==
While Hydrocharis spongia is native to some parts of America, climate change can cause it and other members of its genus to spread beyond their native range, causing them to threaten the native aquatic plants in these new areas. Additionally, American Frog-bit can cause negative ecological, social, and economic impacts that can harm aquatic fauna (i.e., dissolved oxygen depletion) and restrict human uses of water when it is allowed to grow extensively. This is because American Frog-bit can form large, extensive mats, which can grow out of control if they aren’t kept in check, encouraging the use of herbicides in areas where it is spreading. This is rather concerning, since climate change in the American southeast has been increasing temperatures in the region by about 2°F since 1970.

== Cultivation and usage ==
The primary use for cultivating Hydrocharis spongia is to provide shade for fish or other aquatic fauna in domestic tanks, ponds, or pools. American Frog-bit prefers full sun, and blooms during the summer. Stagnant or slow-moving water is preferred, and it can spread aggressively in areas with warm climates. A fungal disease, known as Cercospora limnobii, can cause brown lesions to develop on the leaf blades.

== Gallery ==
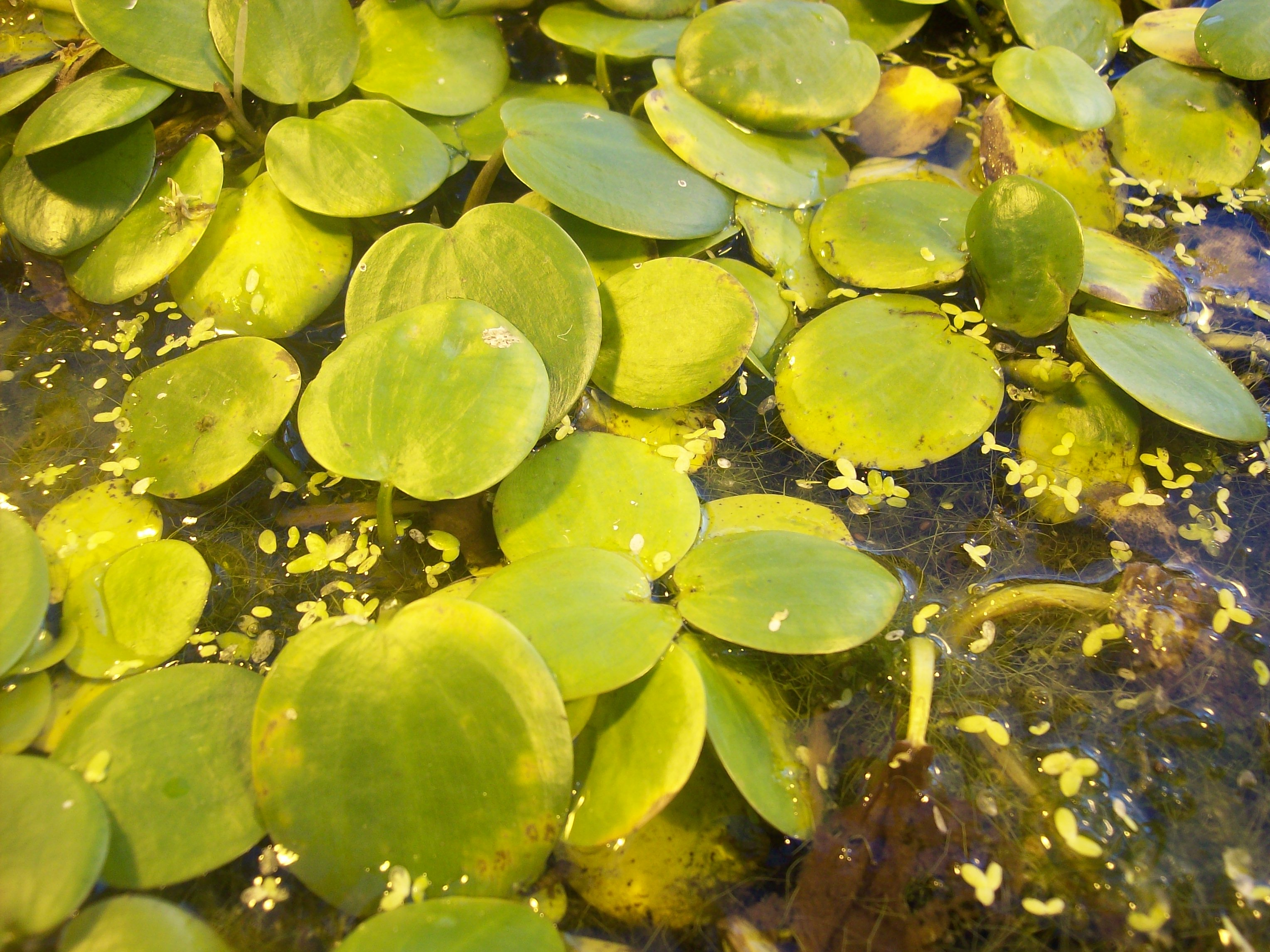
Leaves on water surface

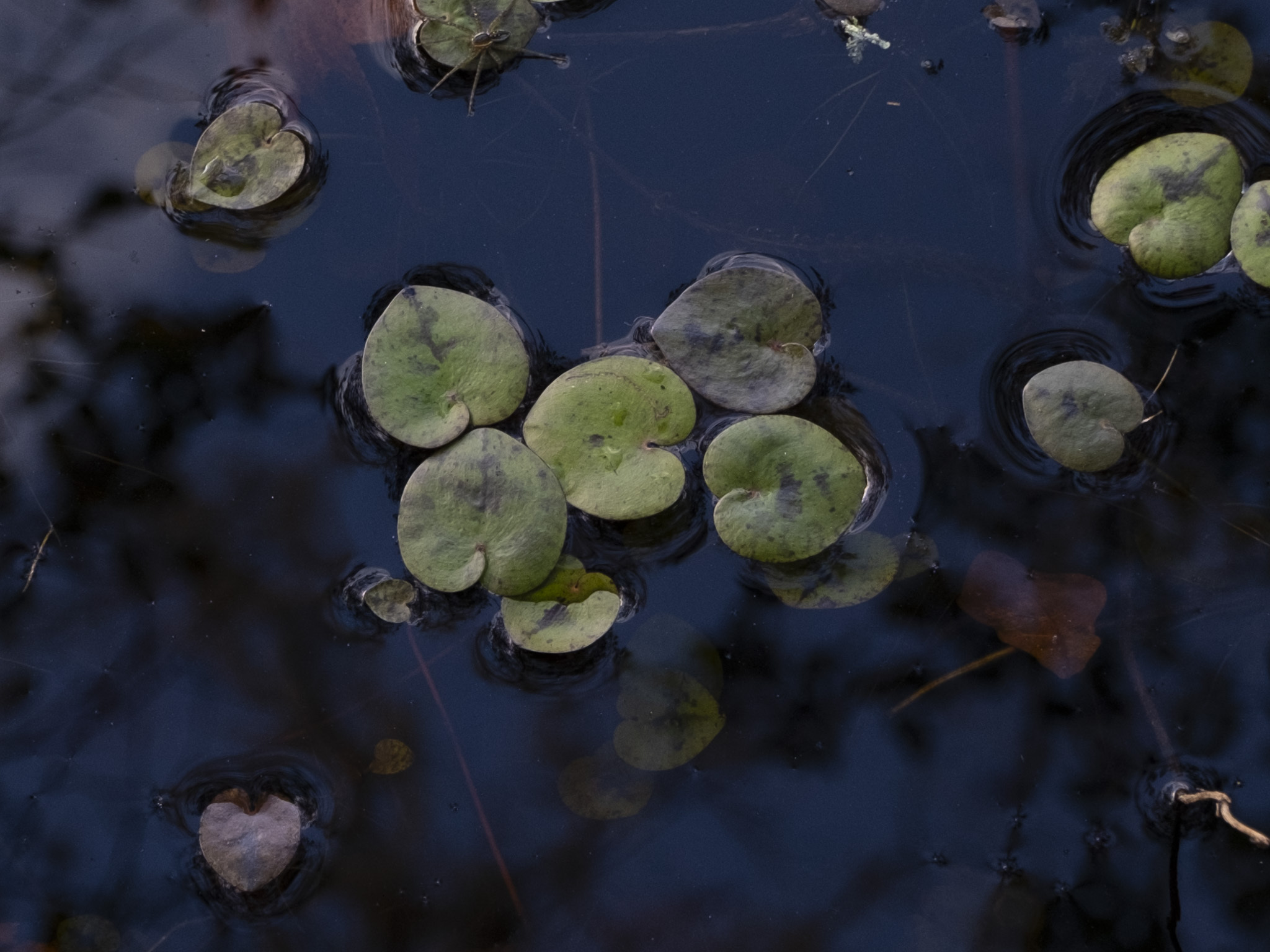
Floating plants

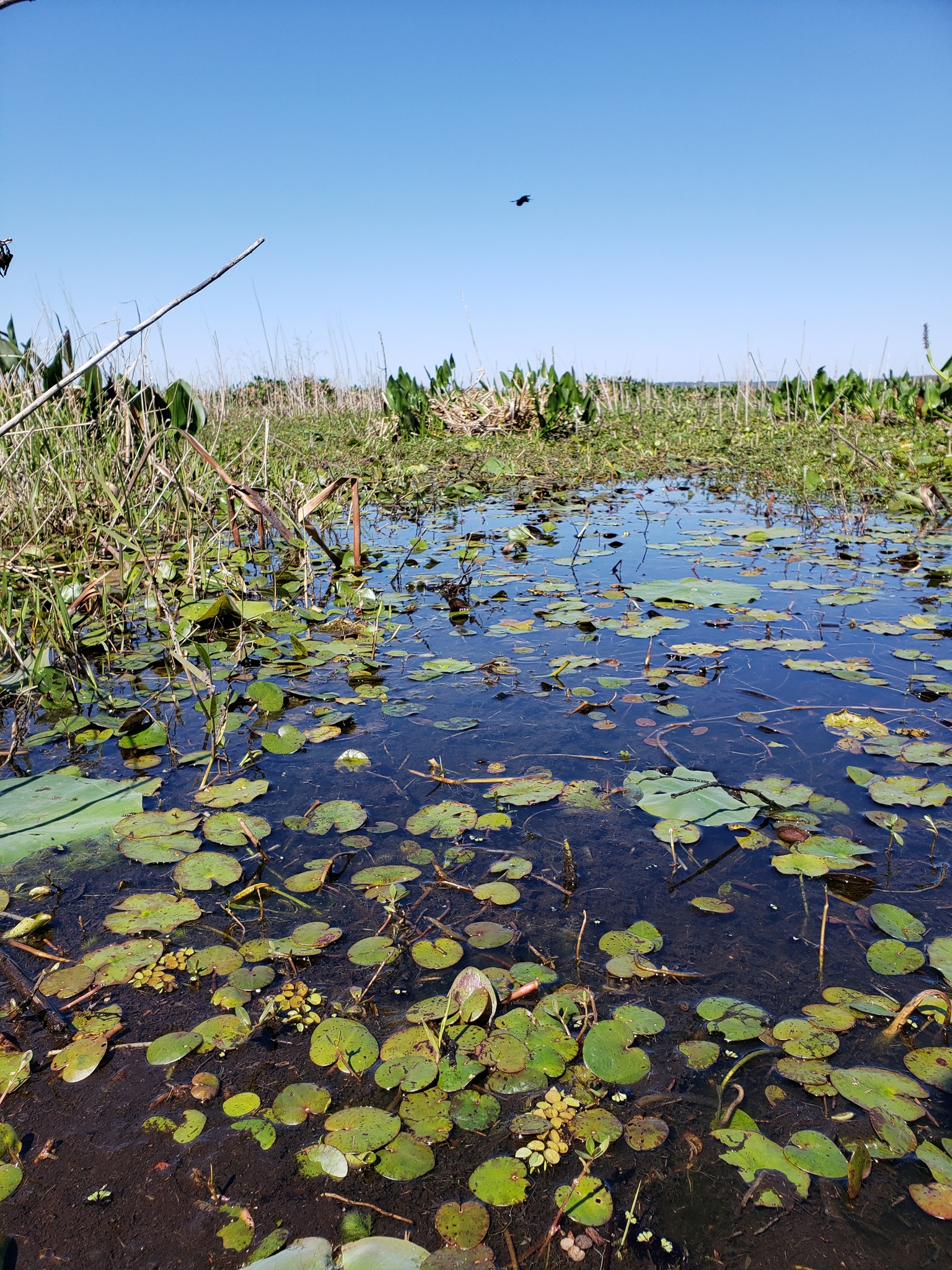
Hydrocharis spongia in wetland habitat
