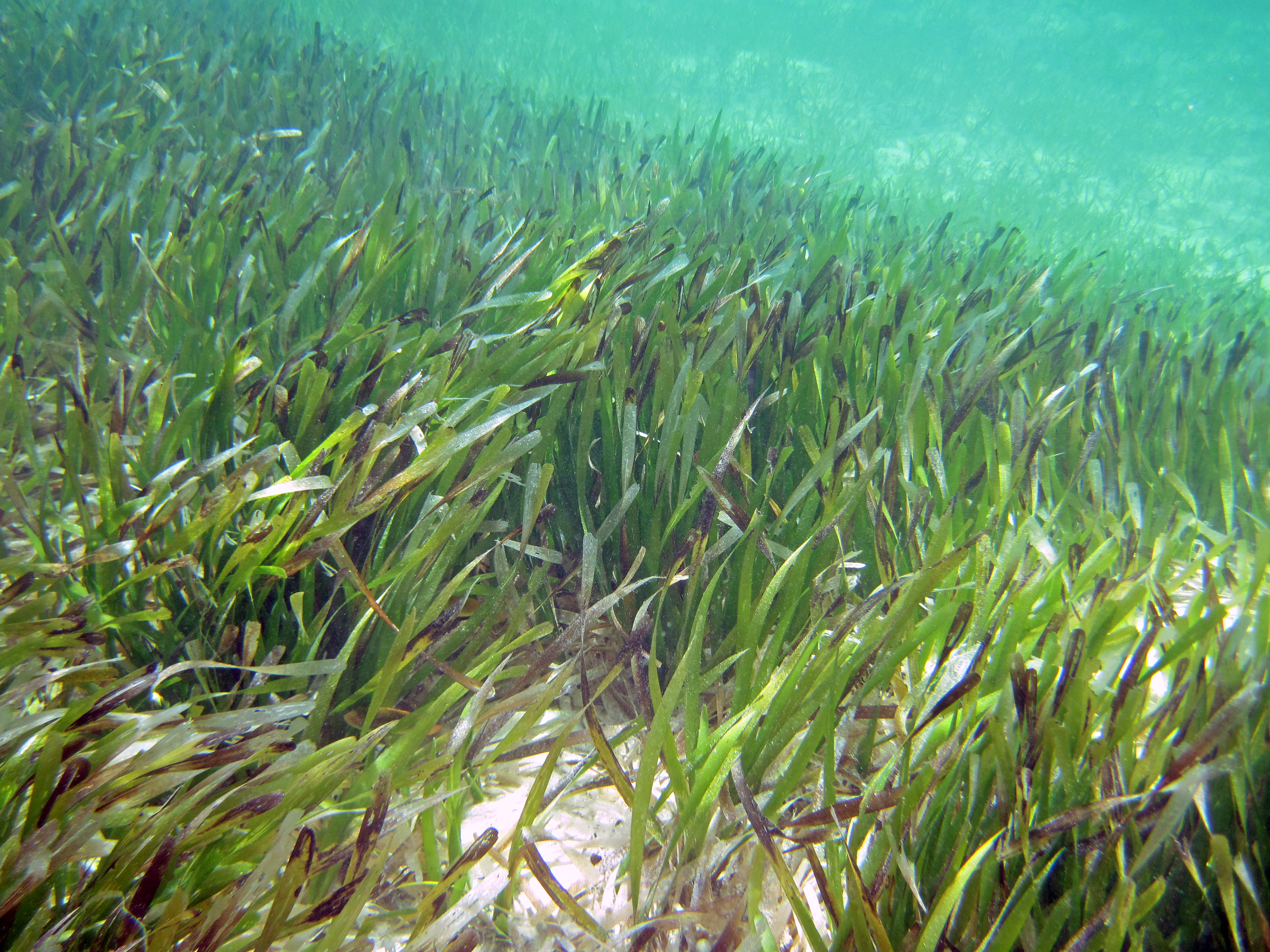
- Turtle grass meadow in San Salvador Island

Conservation status
- Least Concern (IUCN 3.1)

- Apparently Secure (NatureServe)

Scientific classification
- Kingdom: Plantae
- Clade: Embryophytes
- Clade: Tracheophytes
- Clade: Angiosperms
- Clade: Monocots
- Order: Alismatales
- Family: Hydrocharitaceae
- Genus: Thalassia
- Species: T. testudinum

Binomial name
- Thalassia testudinum Banks & Sol. ex König

Synonyms
- Thalassia vitrariorum Pers.

= Thalassia testudinum =

Thalassia testudinum Temporal range: Middle Eocene–Present

Species of aquatic plant

Thalassia testudinum, commonly known as turtlegrass, is a species of marine seagrass in the family Hydrocharitaceae. It forms meadows in shallow, sandy water in locations in the Caribbean Sea and the Gulf of Mexico. Turtle grass and other seagrasses form meadows which are important habitats and feeding grounds. The grass is eaten by turtles and herbivorous fish, supports many epiphytes, and provides habitat for juvenile fish and many invertebrate taxa.

== Description ==
Thalassia testudinum is a perennial grass growing from a long, jointed rhizome. The rhizome is buried in the substrate 5 to 10 cm (2 to 4 in) deep, exceptionally down to 25 centimetres (9.8 in). Some nodes are leafless but others bear a tuft of several erect, linear leaf blades. These are up to 30 centimetres (12 in) long and 2 cm (0.8 in) wide and have rounded tips. The flowers grow on short stalks in the axils of the leaves and are greenish-white, sometimes tinged pink, and are followed by seed pods.

== Distribution and habitat ==
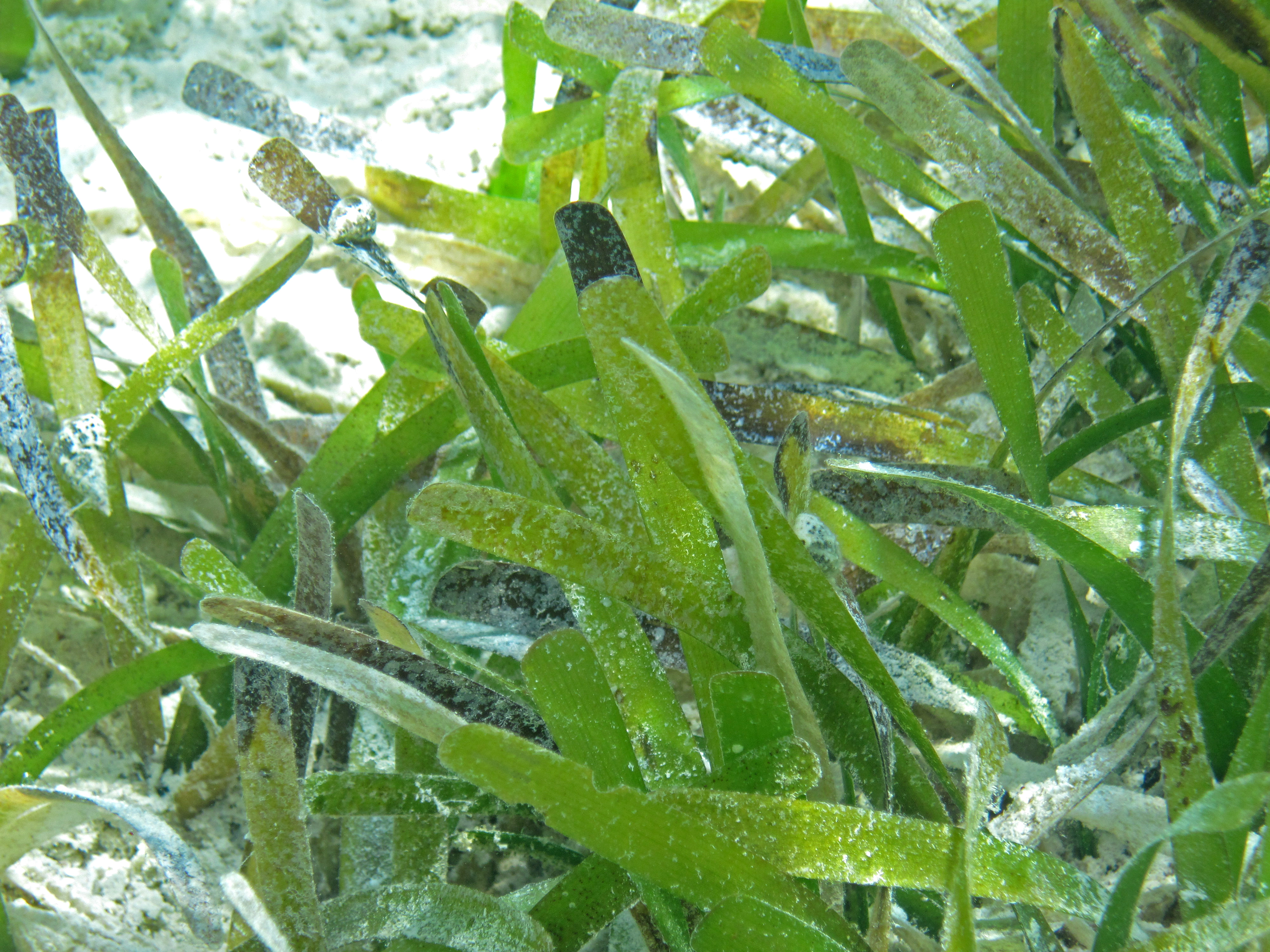
Thalassia testudinum up close

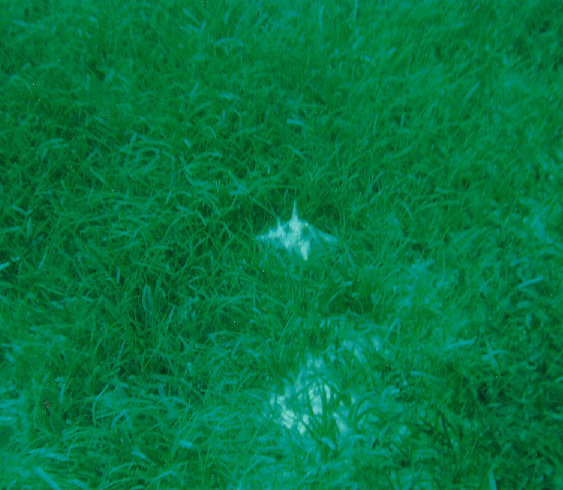
Seagrass bed with dense Thalassia testudinum (and immature queen conch)

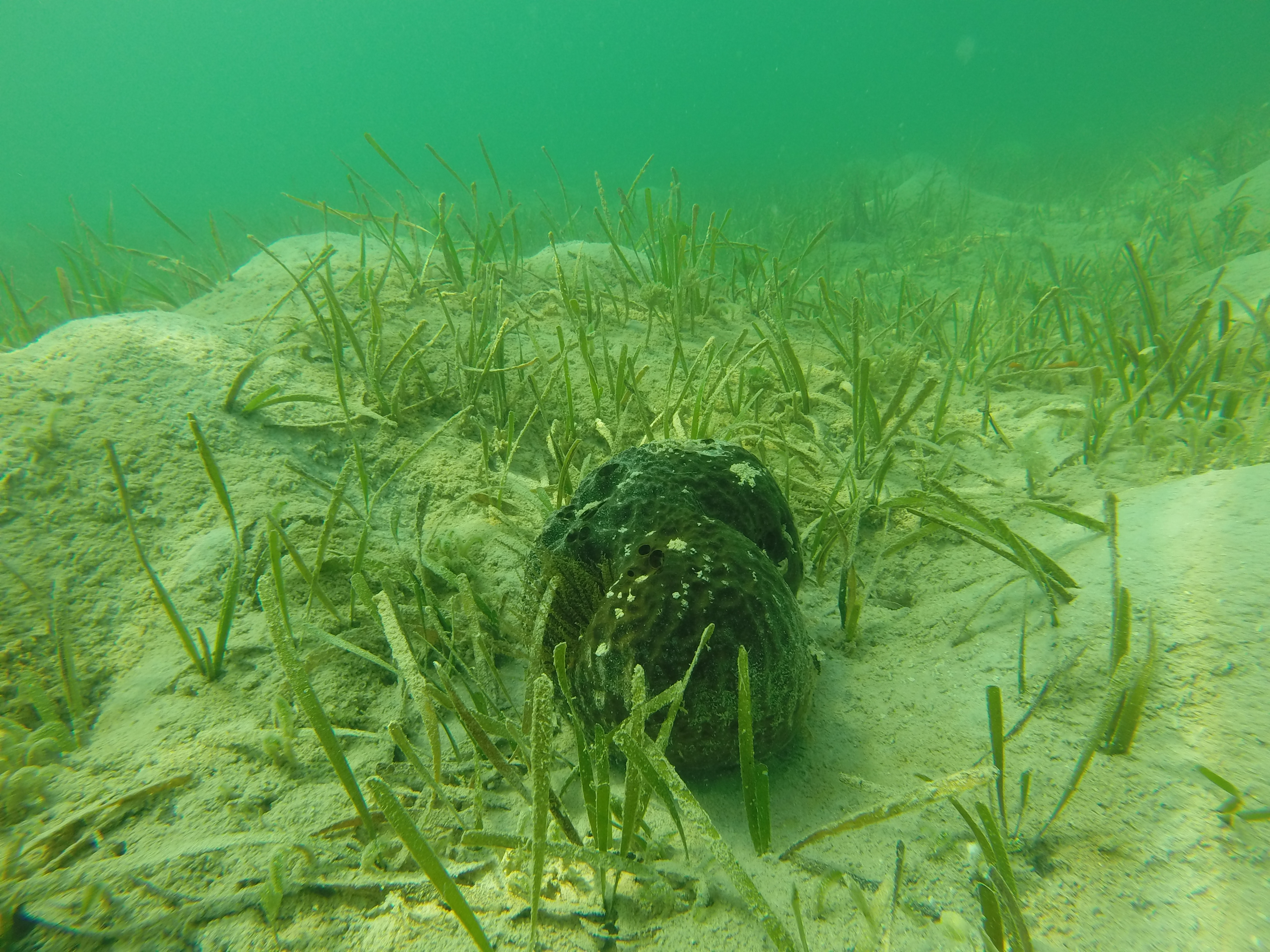
Thalassia testudinum with sponge and anemone

Thalassia testudinum nearby Archer Key, FL

Turtle grass grows in meadows in calm shallow waters throughout the Caribbean Sea and the Gulf of Mexico, and as far north as Cape Canaveral in Florida. Extensive meadows can be formed on muddy sand, and coarse sandy and clayey seabeds, especially those with a calcareous content. This grass favours high-salinity waters with low turbidity, such as calm lagoons. It cannot grow in fresh water but some growth is possible at a salinity of 10 parts per thousand. The plant's preferred salinity range is 25 to 38.5 parts per thousand with a temperature range of 20 to 30 °C (68 to 86 °F). It is found from the low-tide mark down to depths of 30 metres (98 ft), depending on water clarity. It often grows in meadows with other seagrasses where it is the climax species.

Its temporal range spans from the Middle Eocene to present.

== Reproduction ==
Turtle grass can reproduce both through vegetative and sexual reproduction. The main propagation method is by extension of the underground rhizome, or stem. This increase in rhizome length results in asexual ramets, or clonal colonies which are genetic replicates of the parent plant. Although asexual propagation results in an increase in the size of the turtle grass bed, extensive asexual reproduction limits genetic diversity and can put the meadow at severe risk if there is a disease outbreak. It has been found that where plants have been damaged mechanically, such as by the propellers of boats, the cut ends of rhizomes are unable to grow and holes may develop in the turtle grass meadow.

Turtle grass can also sexually reproduce through the production of underwater flowers and hydrophily. Turtle grass is dioecious, which means that there are separate male and female plants, each which produce an imperfect flower containing only one sex. Sexual reproduction takes place from April to July depending on location, though flowering has been observed during warm winters in Tampa Bay, Florida. The small flowers are each borne by a peduncle. Female plants typically grow one green flower, while males often produce three to five pink or white flowers. At night when male flowers are fully mature, they release mucilaginous pollen into the water column. The following morning, female flowers open.

There are two methods of pollination: hydrophily and biotic pollination. In hydrophilic pollination, the pollen grains are carried through the water column by tides or currents and deposited upon an open pistillate flower. Underwater video cameras have more recently revealed crustaceans, polychaetes, and amphipods swimming towards open male flowers. These creatures were attracted to the seagrass's nutritious mucilage—a carbohydrate-rich substance that houses pollen. As the invertebrates feed on the mucilage, excess pollen grains stick to their bodies. They move from flower to flower, feeding and spreading the pollen from male to female.

Seeds begin to develop in about 2–4 weeks if fertilization occurred. Female turtle grass fruits develop into green capsule about 20–25 mm in diameter and can include 1–6 small seeds. After about 8 weeks of growth, the fruit undergoes dehiscence (botany), which releases neutrally buoyant seeds into the water column. If an event occurs producing significant water turbulence, an immature fruit may break off from the peduncle. This buoyant fruit acts as a transportation vessel as it continues to develop. The fruit will be moved around by wind, currents, and tides until it eventually splits open to release the negatively buoyant seedlings into a new area. If the new location has favorable environmental conditions, the seedling will begin to grow. This is one way viviparous seedlings can start new patches of seagrass.

== Ecology ==
Turtle grass and other seagrasses form meadows which are important habitats and feeding grounds. Associated seagrass species include Halophila engelmannii and Syringodium filiforme. Many epiphytes grow on the grasses, and algae, diatoms and bacterial films cover the surface of the leaf blades. The grass is eaten by turtles, herbivorous parrotfish, surgeonfish, and sea urchins, while the leaf surface films are a food source for many small invertebrates. Decaying turtle grass leaves are responsible for the majority of detritus in meadow areas. This grass is subject to periodic dieback episodes in the Florida Bay area. One such episode in 1987 killed off a large proportion of the plants and the resulting increased sedimentation and greater growth of epiphytes on the remaining plants caused a secondary dieback event. The areas affected have since been reseeded and planted with rhizomes and have recovered. In general, the population of this grass is stable.

Rhizomatous green algae in the genus Caulerpa often live among the grasses and many animal make seagrass meadows their home. These include bivalves and other molluscs, polychaete worms, amphipods, juvenile fish (which hide among the leaf blades), sea urchin, crabs, and caridean shrimps.

== Relationship to humans ==
Along with Thalassia hemprichii (which shares its common name with Thalassia testudinum), turtle grass makes its way into the aquarium trade and it may be cropped at 12 in/30 cm.
