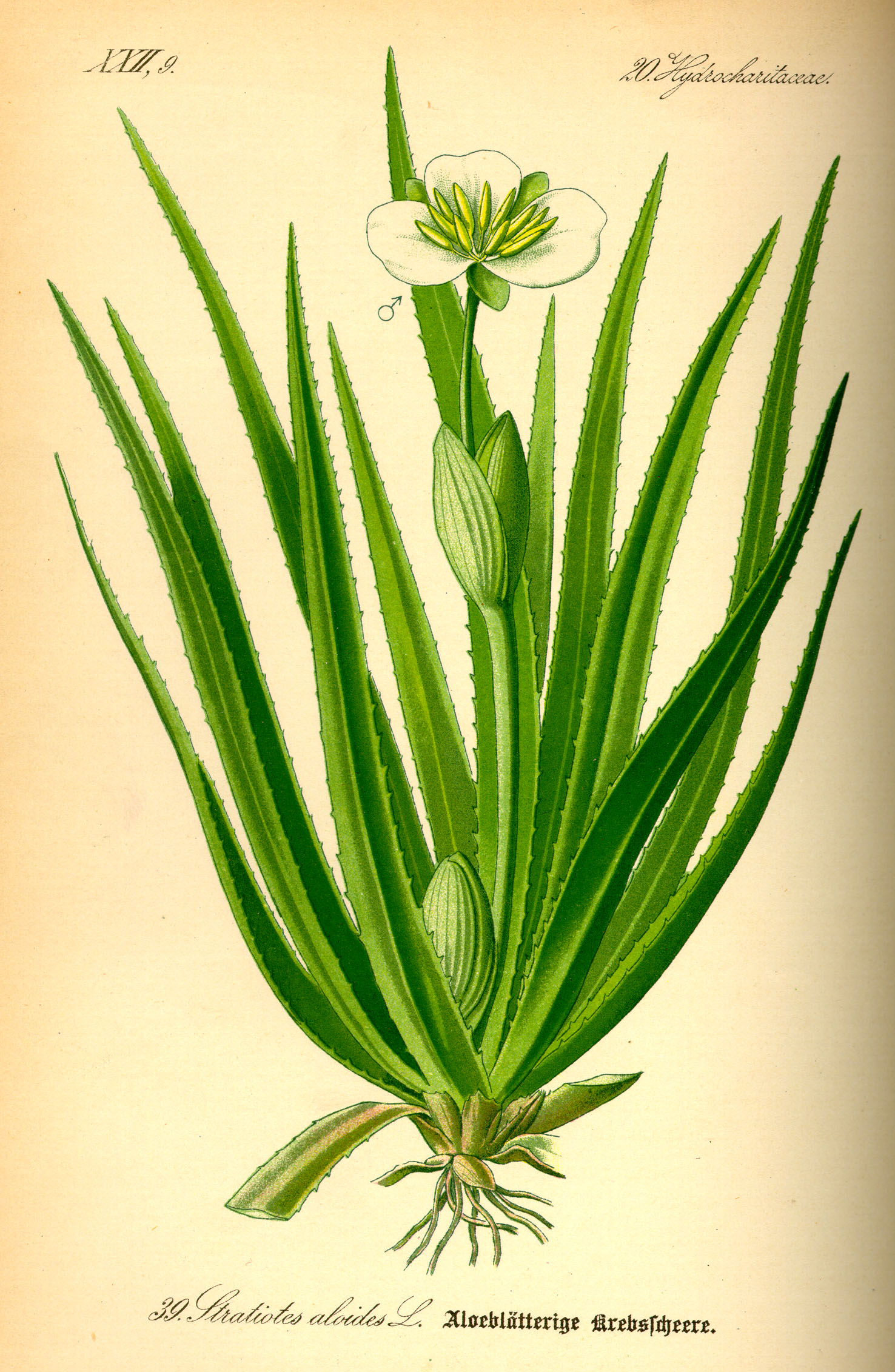
- Stratiotes aloides

Scientific classification
- Kingdom: Plantae
- Clade: Tracheophytes
- Clade: Angiosperms
- Clade: Monocots
- Order: Alismatales
- Family: Hydrocharitaceae
- Subfamily: Stratiotoideae; Luersson
- Genus: Stratiotes; L.
- Species: S. aloides

Binomial name
- Stratiotes aloides L.

Synonyms
- Stratiotes aculeatus Stokes; Stratiotes aloides f. submersa Glück; Stratiotes aquaticus Pall.; Stratiotes ensiformis Gilib.; Stratiotes generalis E.H.L.Krause

= Stratiotes =

Water soldier

Genus of flowering plants in the family Hydrocharitaceae

Stratiotes is a genus of aquatic plants in the family Hydrocharitaceae, described as a genus by Carl Linnaeus in 1753. It contains only one species, Stratiotes aloides, commonly known as water soldiers, which is native to Europe and Central Asia.

== Description ==
The leaves are serrate and very brittle, breaking easily when handled. Reproduction is generally by offsets, which may number five or more per plant. In the UK, male plants have rarely if ever been recorded, although some hermaphrodite flowers have been recorded from more southerly locations. Sexual reproduction is not known to occur. A characteristic of the genus is the habit of the plants rising to the surface at flowering time.

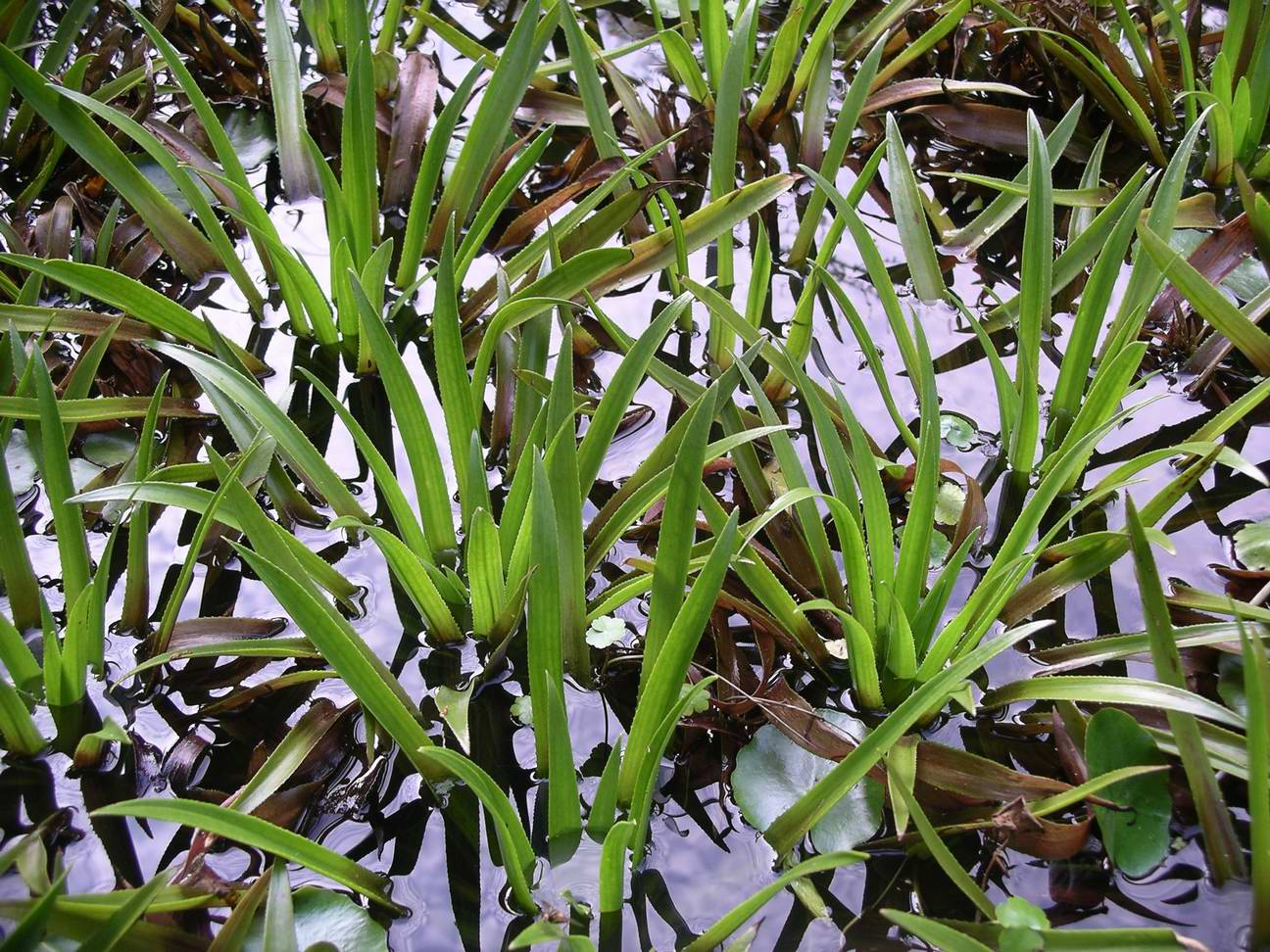
Habit

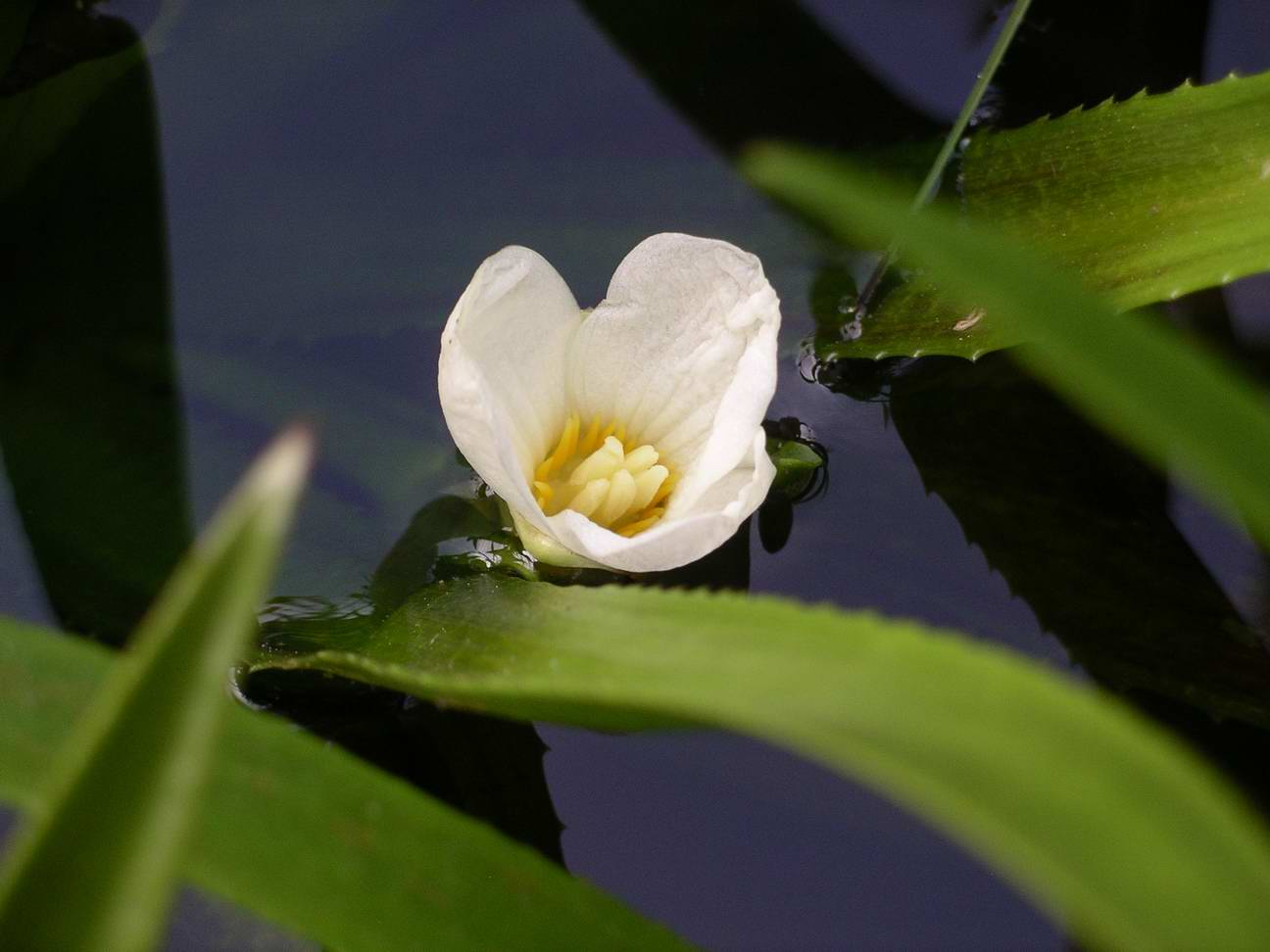
Flower

== Distribution ==
It is native to the following regions as defined in the World Geographical Scheme for Recording Plant Distributions:

- Northern Europe – Denmark, Finland, Great Britain, Sweden
- Middle Europe – Austria, Belgium, Czechoslovakia, Germany, Hungary, Netherlands, Poland
- Southwestern Europe – Spain
- Southeastern Europe – Bulgaria, Greece, Italy, Romania, Turkey-in-Europe, Yugoslavia
- Eastern Europe – Baltic States, Belarus, Central European Russia, East European Russia, North European Russia, Northwest European Russia, South European Russia, Ukraine
- Siberia – Altay, Krasnoyarsk, West Siberia
- Middle Asia – Kazakhstan
- Caucasus – North Caucasus
- Western Asia – Turkey

== Taxonomy ==
Stratiotes is one of 14 genera in the family Hydrocharitaceae. It was erected by Carl Linnaeus to accommodate the species Stratiotes alismoides (now moved to the genus Ottelia).

=== Incuded species ===
- Stratiotes aloides

=== Formerly included taxa ===
- Stratiotes acoroides – now Enhalus acoroides
- Stratiotes alismoides – now Ottelia alismoides
- Stratiotes nymphoides – now Hydrocleys nymphoides
- Stratiotes quinquealatus – now Ottelia alismoides

== Ecology ==
The plant appears to be associated with calcareous waters and there is a suggestion that changing levels of calcium carbonate on the leaves may explain the floating and submerging behaviour.

The rare dragonfly, the Norfolk hawker (Aeshna isosceles), relies on the presence of Stratiotes aloides as a food source for the smaller insects on which it feeds. The plant is very winter hardy.

== Fossil record ==
Several fossil seeds of †Stratiotes kaltennordheimensis have been extracted from borehole samples of the Middle Miocene fresh water deposits in Nowy Sącz Basin, Poland.

== Uses ==
Stratiotes aloides is commonly used in cool water ponds and aquariums in Europe.
