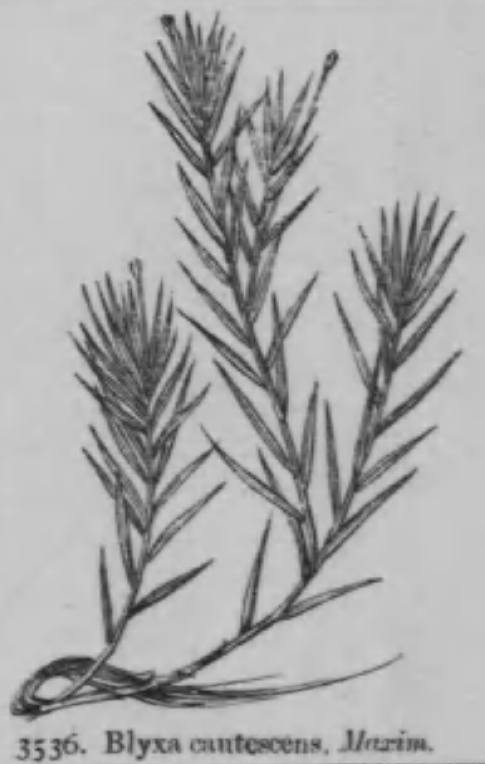
- As drawn by Michio Murakoshi, 1925

Conservation status
- Least Concern (IUCN 3.1)

Scientific classification
- Kingdom: Plantae
- Clade: Tracheophytes
- Clade: Angiosperms
- Clade: Monocots
- Order: Alismatales
- Family: Hydrocharitaceae
- Genus: Blyxa
- Species: B. japonica

Binomial name
- Blyxa japonica (Miq.) Maxim. ex Asch. & Gürke

Varieties
- Blyxa japonica var. alternifolia (Miq.) C.D.K.Cook & Luond; Blyxa japonica var. japonica

Synonyms
- Hydrilla japonica Miq.; var. alternifolia: Hydrilla alternifolia Miq.; Enhydrias angustipetala Ridl.; Blyxa angustipetala (Ridl.) Masam.; Blyxa alternifolia (Miq.) Hartog; var. japonica: Blyxa caulescens Maxim. ex Matsum.; Blyxa leiocarpa Maxim. ex Matsum.; Diplosiphon caulescens Maxim. ex Matsum.; Diplosiphon leiocarpa Maxim. ex Matsum.; Blyxa laevissima Hayata; Enhydrias angustipetala var. latifolia Ridl.; Blyxa angustipetala var. laevissima (Hayata) Masam.

= Blyxa japonica =

Species of plant

Blyixa japonica is a species of plant in the family Hydrocharitaceae. It is known as Japanese blyxa or dwarf Asian grass.

== Description ==
The flowers are bisexual, actinomorphic and have numerous ovules. It has whorled leaves. It can be told from the genus Limnobium by its pollen, which has spine-like projections.

== Distribution ==
The species is native to China, Taiwan, Japan, and Papua New Guinea. It has naturalized in Italy. In the wild, the species is found in shallow, stagnant water such as rice paddies.

== Cultivation ==
The species, along with other members of the genus such as Blyxa aubertii, are common in the aquarium trade. B. japonica is difficult and demanding to grow.

B. japonica var. japonica, B. j. var. alternifolia, and B. j. var. recurvifolia are all found in cultivation.
