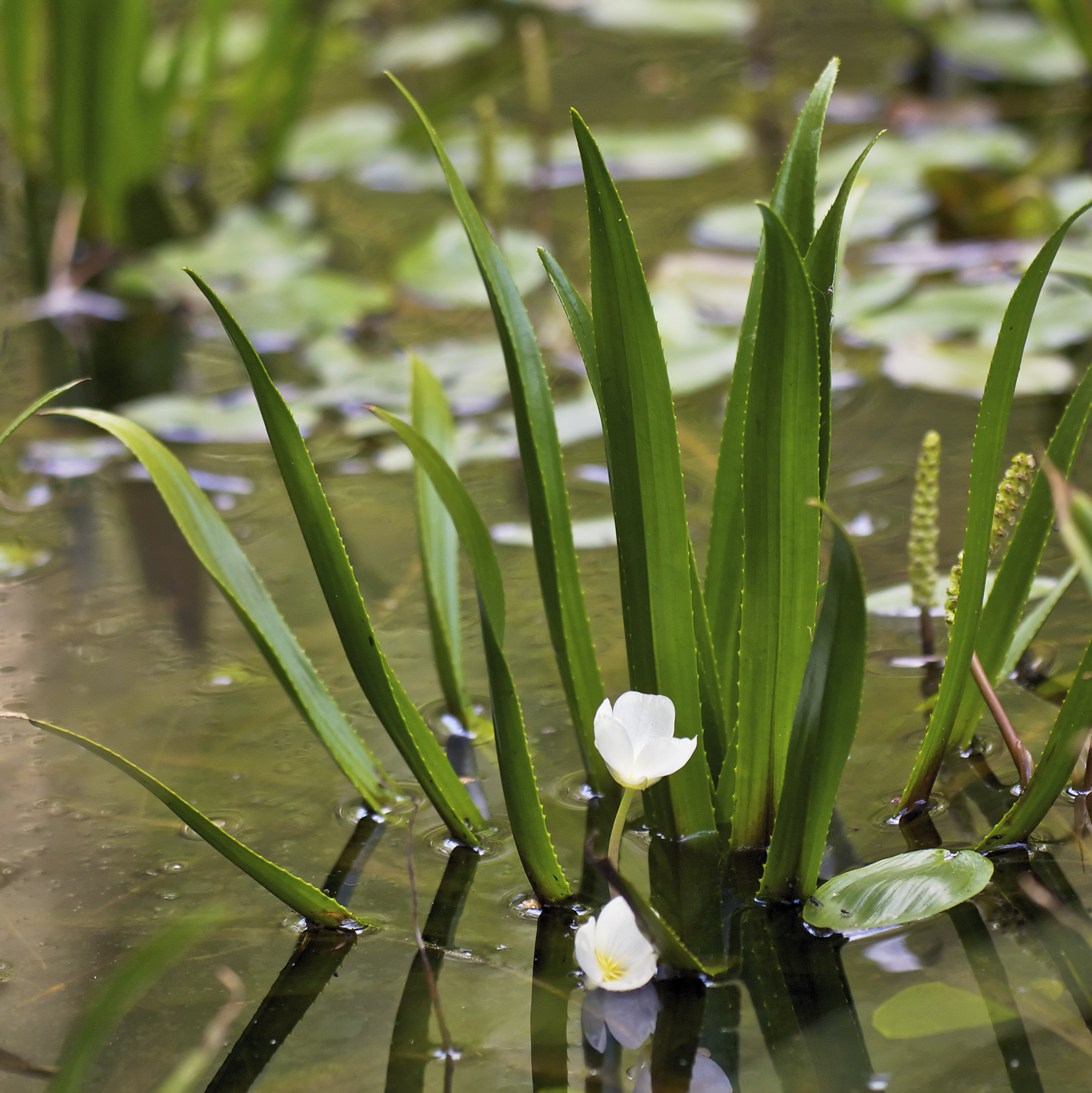

Conservation status
- Least Concern (IUCN 3.1)

Scientific classification
- Kingdom: Plantae
- Clade: Tracheophytes
- Clade: Angiosperms
- Clade: Monocots
- Order: Alismatales
- Family: Hydrocharitaceae
- Genus: Stratiotes
- Species: S. aloides

Binomial name
- Stratiotes aloides L.

Synonyms
- Stratiotes aquaticus Pall.; Stratiotes ensiformis Gilib.; Stratiotes aculeatus Stokes; Stratiotes generalis E.H.L.Krause

= Stratiotes aloides =

Species of aquatic plant

Stratiotes aloides, commonly known as water-soldier or water pineapple, is a submerged aquatic plant native to Europe and northwestern Asia. In Britain it was once common in East Anglia and still is in many places, particularly wet ditches and healthy ponds. It is the only species in the genus Stratiotes.

== Description ==
Stratiotes aloides has a rosette of serrated leaves, lanceolate, up to 30 cm long in tufts. White flowers up to 45 mm across, with many stamens in the male plants, are produced in the summer.

== Ecological aspects ==
In the summer this plant floats on the water surface with the leaves just above the surface. In the autumn they become covered with a slimy secretion (calcium carbonate) and the whole plant sinks to the bottom to rise again in the spring. Fossils have been found of this plant.

Plants are dioecious. Male and female plants must be grown if seed is required. Only the female plant occurs naturally in Britain, though plants with hermaphrodite flowers are also found occasionally. Seed is never set in Britain, the plants increasing mainly by offsets.

== Distribution ==
In Ireland, it is found in shallow waters where it was introduced. Apparently now extinct in the north-east of Ireland. Rare in east England.

=== Invasive species ===
Stratiotes aloides has been found in the Trent River in eastern Ontario, Canada.

== Cultivation ==
Most suitable for the cool aquarium or pond.

Propagation from runners which form from the centre of the rosette of leaves.

The herb has had a high reputation for treating wounds, especially when these are made by an iron implement. It is applied externally. The plant is also said to be of use in the treatment of ergotism and also of bruised kidneys.
