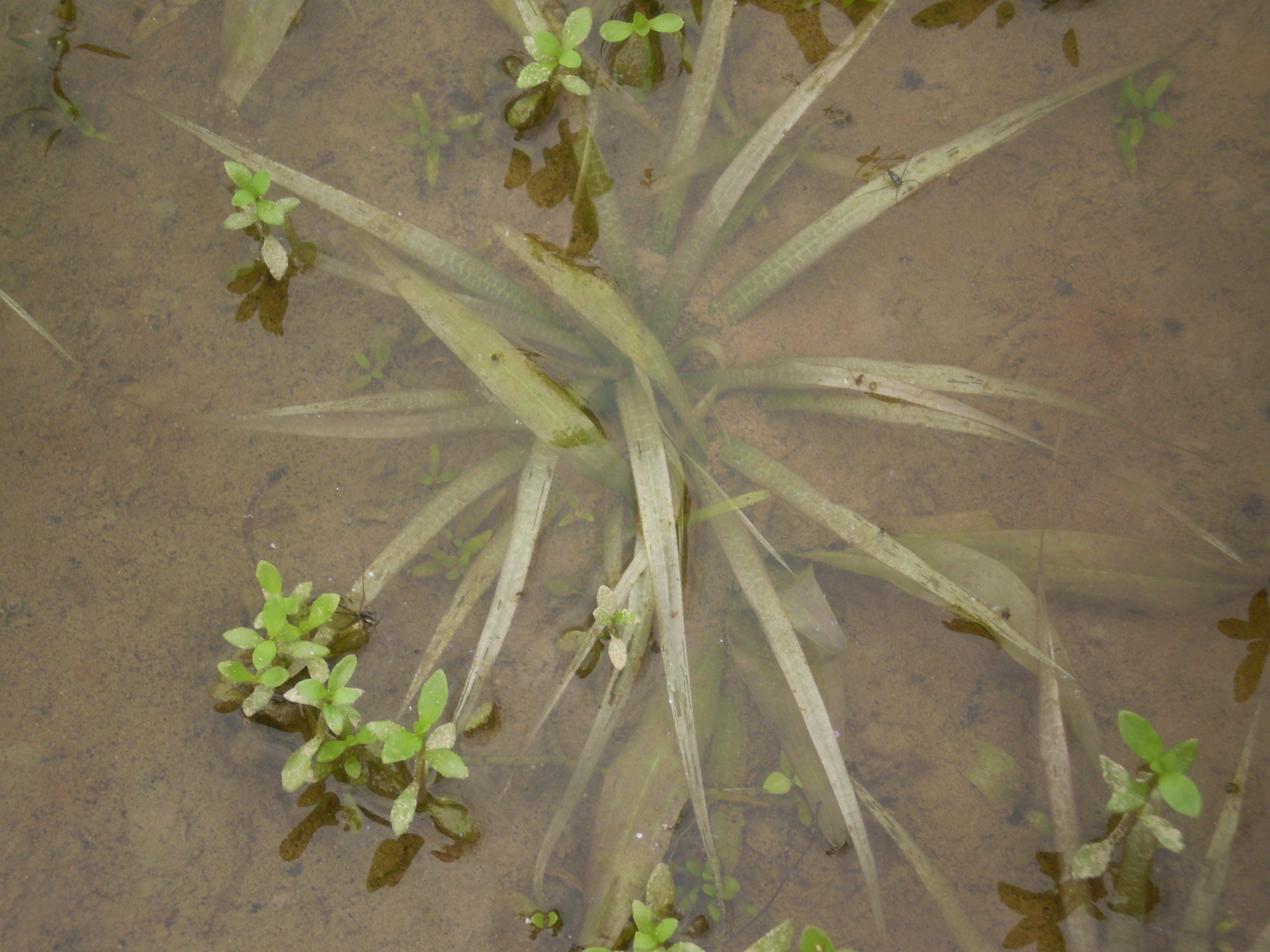
- Blyxa echinosperma

Scientific classification
- Kingdom: Plantae
- Clade: Tracheophytes
- Clade: Angiosperms
- Clade: Monocots
- Order: Alismatales
- Family: Hydrocharitaceae
- Subfamily: Anacharioideae
- Genus: Blyxa; Thouars ex Rich

Synonyms
- Diplosiphon Decne.; Hydrotrophus C.B.Clarke; Enhydrias Ridl.; Blyxopsis Kuntze

= Blyxa =

Genus of aquatic plants

Blyxa is a genus of an aquatic plant of the family Hydrocharitaceae described as a genus in 1806.

It is native to tropical and subtropical regions of Africa, Asia, Madagascar, and Australia.

Species

1. Blyxa aubertii A. Rich. - China, Japan, Korea, Indian Subcontinent, SE Asia, New Guinea, N Australia, Caroline Islands, Madagascar, Tanzania, Mozambique
2. Blyxa echinosperma (C.B.Clarke) Hook.f. - China, Japan, Korea, Indian Subcontinent, SE Asia, New Guinea, N Australia
3. Blyxa hexandra C.D.K.Cook & Luond - central Africa
4. Blyxa japonica (Miq.) Maxim. ex Asch. & Gürke - China, Japan, Korea, Indian Subcontinent, SE Asia, New Guinea
5. Blyxa javanica Hassk. - Java
6. Blyxa leiosperma Koidz. - Japan, Anhui, Fujian, Guangdong, Hainan, Jiangxi, Zhejiang
7. Blyxa novoguineensis Hartog - Papua New Guinea
8. Blyxa octandra (Roxb.) Planch. ex Thwaites - China, Indian Subcontinent, Myanmar, Thailand, New Guinea
9. Blyxa quadricostata Hartog - Myanmar, Thailand
10. Blyxa radicans Ridl. - central Africa
11. Blyxa senegalensis Dandy - West Africa
12. Blyxa vietii C.D.K.Cook & Luond - Vietnam
