= Blyxa octandra =

Scientific classification
- Kingdom: Plantae
- Clade: Tracheophytes
- Clade: Angiosperms
- Clade: Monocots
- Order: Alismatales
- Family: Hydrocharitaceae
- Genus: Blyxa
- Species: B. octandra

Binomial name
- Blyxa octandra (Roxb.) Planch. ex Thwaites

Aquatic plant

Blyxa octandra is an aquatic plant in the genus Blyxa.

== Distribution ==
Blyxa octandra is native to Southeast Asia and Australia. It is not known from Indonesia.

== Description ==
Blyxa octandra is dioecious, with male plants having pollen on the adaxial surface of the petals, and females having stigmas like petals.
