= Hydrophily =

Type of cross pollination

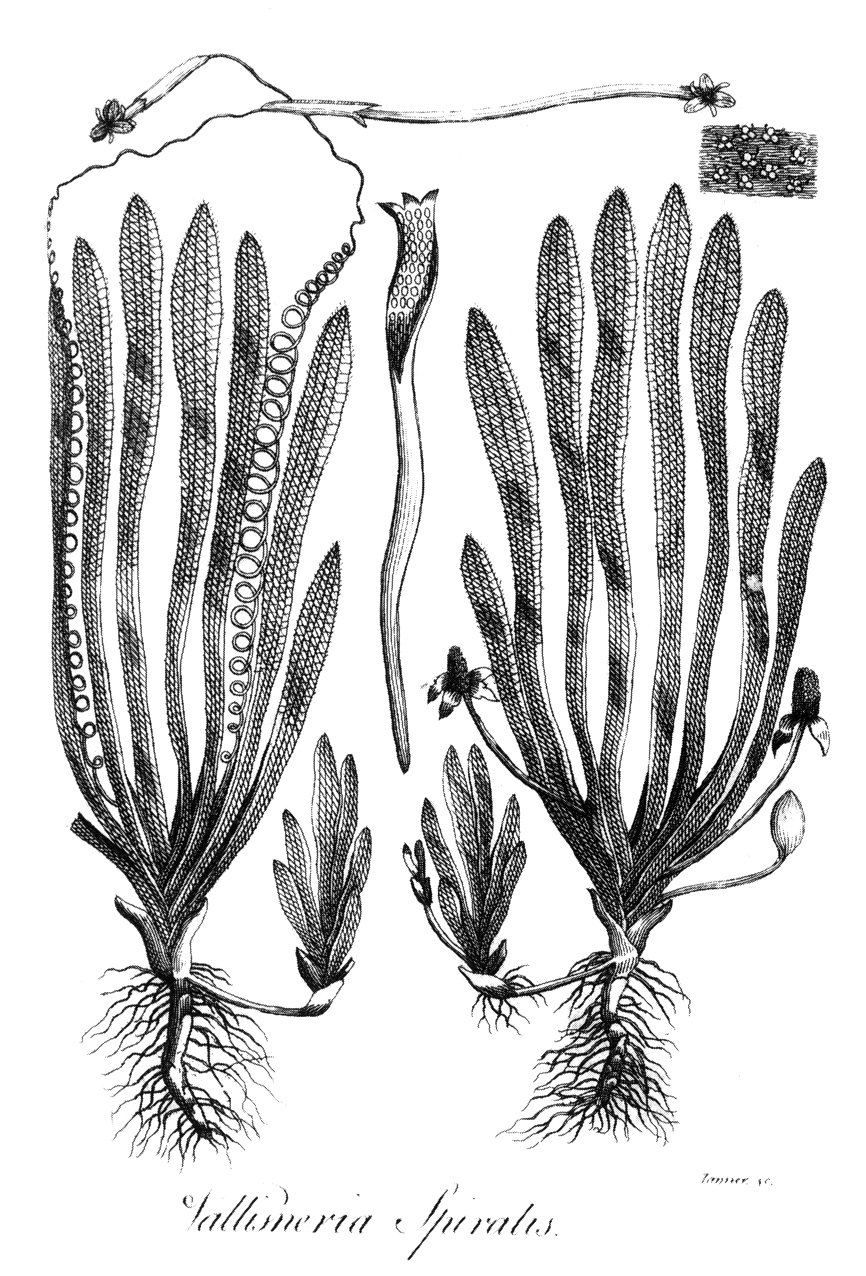
Vallisneria spiralis is an example of hydrophily. Female flowers reach the water's surface temporarily to ensure pollination.

Hydrophily is a fairly uncommon form of pollination whereby pollen is distributed by the flow of waters, particularly in rivers and streams. Hydrophilous species fall into two categories: (i) Those that distribute their pollen to the surface of water. e.g. Vallisneria's male flower or pollen grain are released on the surface of water, which are passively carried away by water currents; some of them eventually reach the female flower (ii) Those that distribute it beneath the surface. e.g. seagrasses in which female flower remain submerged in water and pollen grains are released inside the water.

== Surface pollination ==
Surface pollination is more frequent, and appears to be a transitional phase between wind pollination and true hydrophily. In these the pollen floats on the surface and reaches the stigmas of the female flowers as in Hydrilla, Callitriche, Ruppia, Zostera, Elodea. In Vallisneria the male flowers become detached and float on the surface of the water; the anthers are thus brought in contact with the stigmas of the female flowers. Surface hydrophily has been observed in several species of Potamogeton as well as some marine species.

== Submerged pollination ==
Species exhibiting true submerged hydrophily include Najas, where the pollen grains are heavier than water, and sinking down are caught by the stigmas of the extremely simple female flowers, Posidonia australis or Zostera marina and Hydrilla.

== Evolution ==
Hydrophily is unique to obligate submersed aquatic angiosperms with sexually reproductive parts completely submerged below the water surface. Hydrophily is the adaptive evolution of completely submersed angiosperms to aquatic habitats. True hydrophily occurs in 18 submersed angiosperm genera, which is associated with an unusually high incidence of unisexual flowers.

== Sources ==
- Cox, P.A. (1988). "Hydrophilous pollination". Annual Review of Ecology and Systematics. 19 (1): 261–279. Bibcode:1988AnRES..19..261C. doi:10.1146/annurev.es.19.110188.001401.
