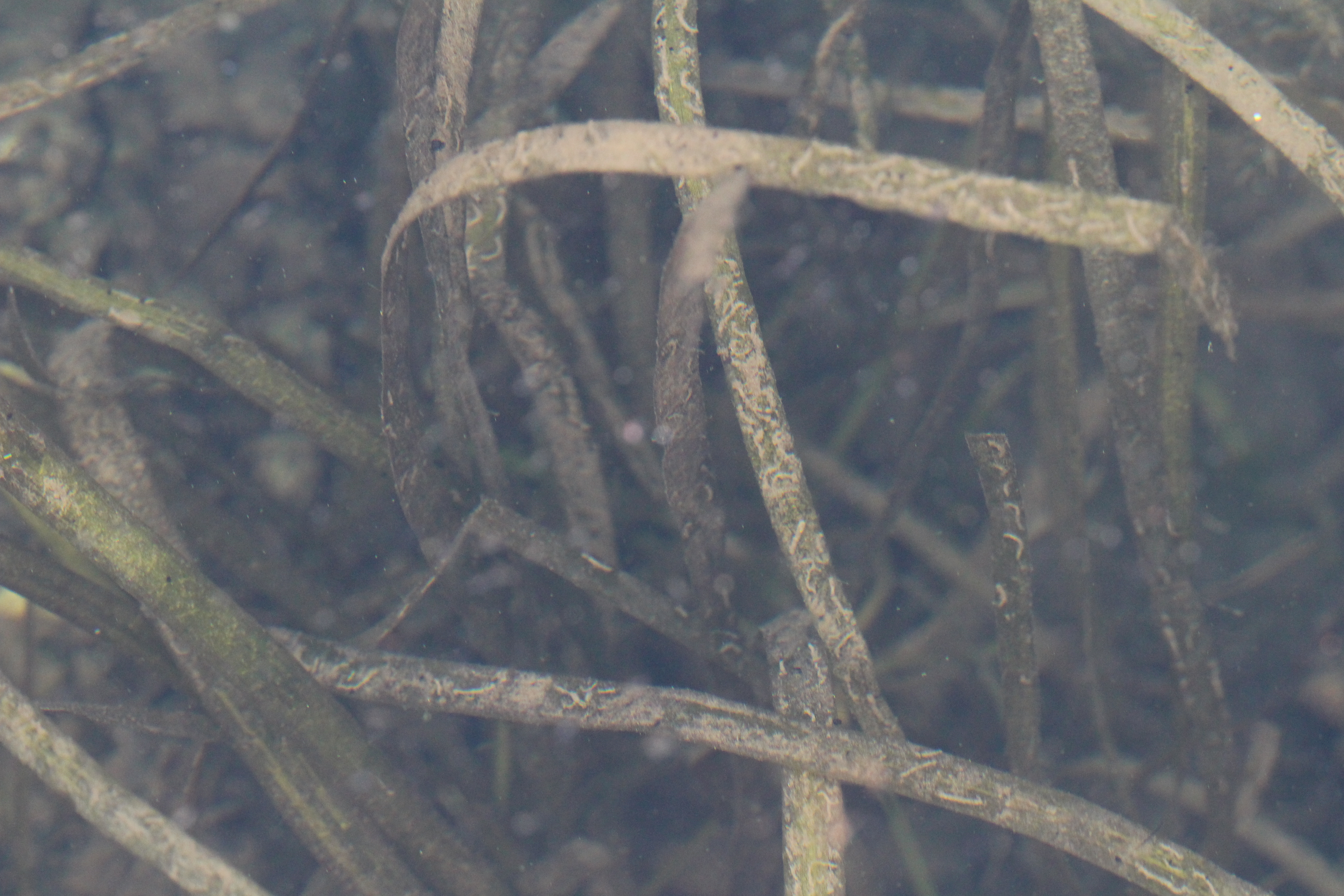

Conservation status
- Least Concern (IUCN 3.1)

- Secure (NatureServe)

Scientific classification
- Kingdom: Plantae
- Clade: Tracheophytes
- Clade: Angiosperms
- Clade: Monocots
- Order: Alismatales
- Family: Hydrocharitaceae
- Genus: Vallisneria
- Species: V. americana

Binomial name
- Vallisneria americana Michx.

= Vallisneria americana =

Species of aquatic plant

Vallisneria americana, commonly called wild celery, water-celery, tape grass, or eelgrass, is a plant in the family Hydrocharitaceae, the "tape-grasses". It is native to the Americas, especially eastern North America.

V. americana is a fresh water species that can tolerate salt, living in salinities varying from fresh water (0 parts per thousand) to 18 parts per thousand, although the limit to the salt tolerance is unclear and is generally dependent on the duration and intensity of the plants' exposure to the saline water. V. americana grows under water and is consumed by various animals, including the canvasback.

== Description ==
The plants are long, limp, flat, and have a green mid-ridge.

V. americana generally maintains its population by clonal reproduction through the use of runners, but they are also capable of reproducing through the use of seeds. Salinity seems to affect the germination process in the same way it does the growth of the plant. The female flowers are solitary and at the end of an incredibly long and thin pedicel; up to 3 m (10 ft) in length, while less than 1 mm thick.

== Distribution and habitat ==
It is native to Canada, the United States, Mexico, Guatemala, Honduras, Cuba, the Dominican Republic, Haiti and Venezuela. It is found primarily in eastern North America, occurring west from Nova Scotia to South Dakota and South to the Gulf of Mexico. It has also been reported in the western states of Washington, Nebraska, New Mexico and Arizona. It has also recently been reported in Oregon.

The salinity tolerance of V. americana has been up to debate, and has been topic of many scientific research and experiments. It has been suggested that the difference between the collected data sets is due to the varying duration of the experiments and the different methodology used in each experiment. The highest tolerance range is generally noted to be anywhere from ten parts per thousand to twenty parts per thousand. Many experiments have shown that the general trend of growth is that as the salinity of the water goes up, the growth of the plant decreases, but the roots of the plants are known to show greater tolerance to salinity than the shoots do.

== Ecology ==
Like many seagrass ecosystems, V. americana beds provide a rich abundance of prey as food for other species, and is a refuge for many species, including commercial, recreational, endangered and invasive organisms, and also acts as a nursery for fishery species. Beds of V. americana, especially in Louisiana, have been known to be homes to many crustaceans, gastropods, other invertebrates and fish, and have been known to be grazed on by West Indian manatees. The beds of V. americana are great at stabilizing sediment and shorelines, facilitating detrital food webs, and improving water quality by filtering the surrounding water.

== Uses ==
V. americana is cultivated for the aquarium trade, where it is a sold as a background plant.
