= Oxygen weed =

Oxygen weed is a common name for several plants and may refer to:

- Egeria densa, a species of aquatic plant native to South America
- Lagarosiphon major, a species of aquatic plant native to Southern Africa
