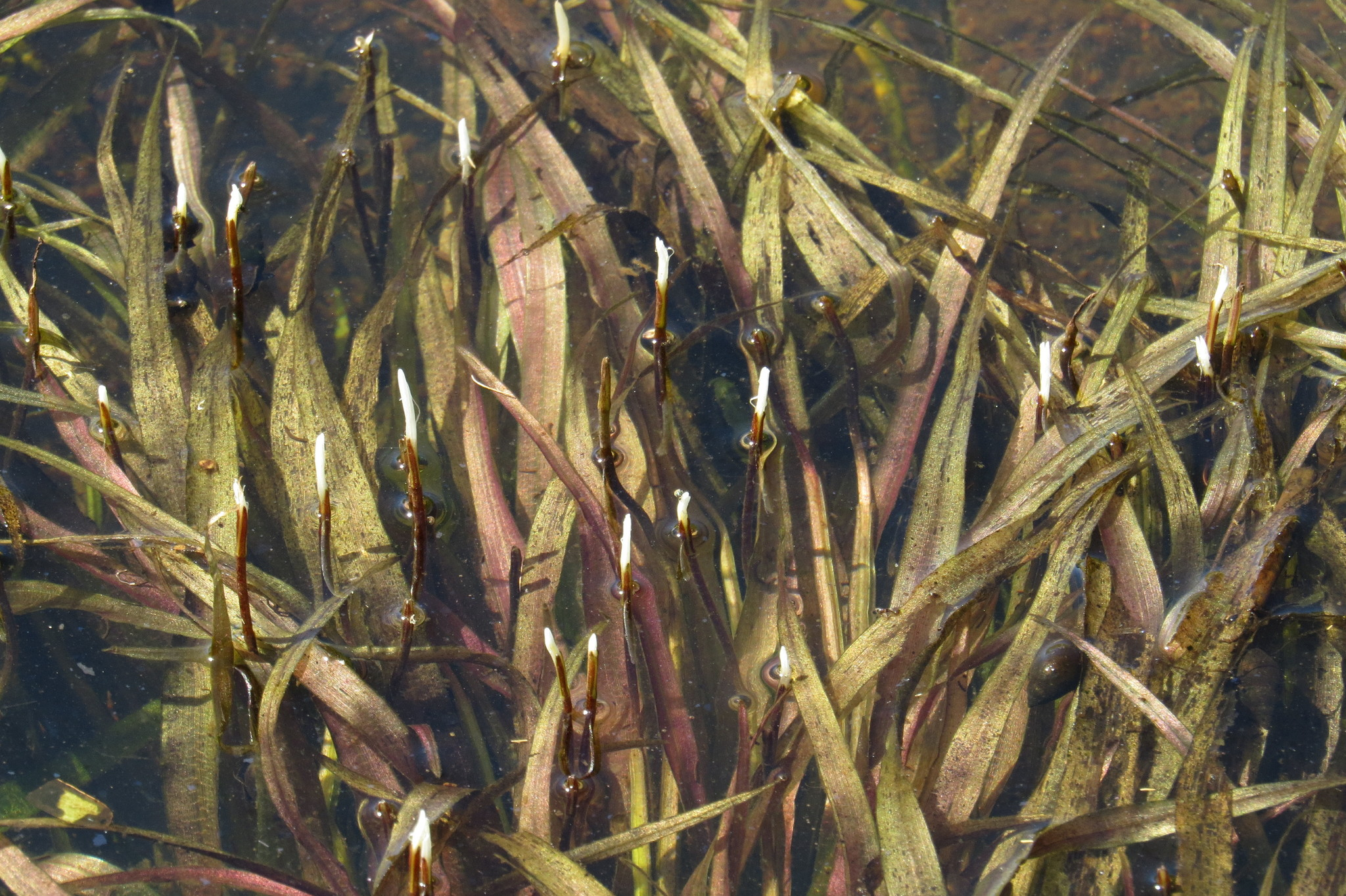

Scientific classification
- Kingdom: Plantae
- Clade: Tracheophytes
- Clade: Angiosperms
- Clade: Monocots
- Order: Alismatales
- Family: Hydrocharitaceae
- Genus: Blyxa
- Species: B. aubertii

Binomial name
- Blyxa aubertii Rich.

Synonyms
- Blyxa ceylanica Hook. f.; Blyxa corana (Lév.) Nakai; Blyxa ecaudata Hayata; Blyxa graminea Steud.; Blyxa griffithii Planch. ex Hook. f.; Blyxa malayana Ridl.; Blyxa muricata Koidz.; Blyxa octandra (Roxb.) Planch. ex Thwaites; Blyxa oryzetorum (Decne.) Hook. f.; Blyxa roxburghii Rich.; Blyxa zeylanica Hook. f.; Diplosiphon oryzetorum Decne.; Hydrolirion coreanum Lév.; Valisneria octandra Roxb.

= Blyxa aubertii =

Species of flowering plant

Blyxa aubertii, common name bamboo plant, is a plant species widespread across Asia, Europe, Africa and Australia, but known from the Western Hemisphere only from a few collections in the southwestern part of the US State of Louisiana. This is an aquatic plant growing in shallow lakes and ponds.

== Description ==
Blyxa aubertii has short stems rarely more than 3 cm (1 in) long. Leaves form a rosette, each leaf long and narrow, up to 60 cm (23.5 in) long but usually less than 10 mm wide. Flowers are greenish-purple, with sepals 5–7 mm (0.20–0.28 in) long and petals up to 17 mm (0.67 in) long.

== Cultivation ==
This and other species in the genus, such as Blyxa japonica, are sold commercially as greenery to grow alongside fish in aquaria. They require moderate or bright light. Blyxa aubertii has been in the aquarium trade for a long time but has never been very popular.
