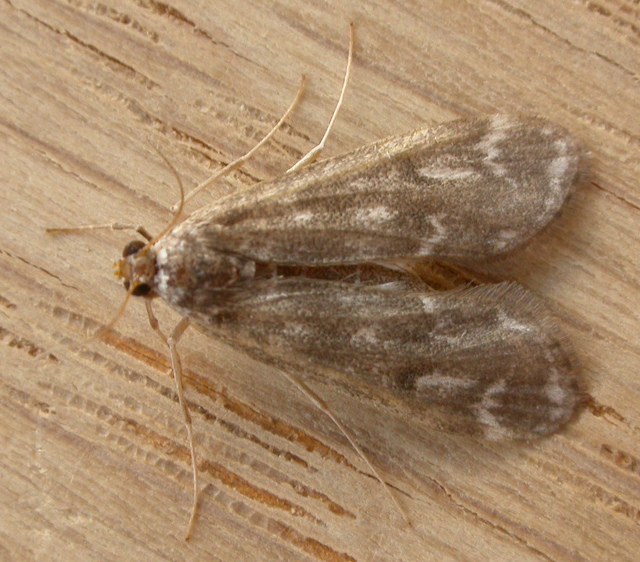
- Hygraula nitens photographed in Aranda, Australia

Scientific classification
- Kingdom: Animalia
- Phylum: Arthropoda
- Class: Insecta
- Order: Lepidoptera
- Family: Crambidae
- Genus: Hygraula
- Species: H. nitens

Binomial name
- Hygraula nitens (Butler, 1880)

Synonyms
- Paraponyx nitens Butler, 1880; Nymphula nitens(Butler, 1880)

= Hygraula nitens =

Species of moth

Hygraula nitens, the pond moth or Australian water moth, is a species of moth in the family Crambidae. It was described by Arthur Gardiner Butler in 1880. It is found in New Zealand and most of Australia, including Tasmania.

The wingspan is about 25 mm.

The caterpillars of this species live underwater. The larvae feed on Potamogeton crispus and Zostera species. They also feed on other alien macrophytes such as Hydrilla verticillata, Lagarosiphon major, and Ceratophyllum demersum.
