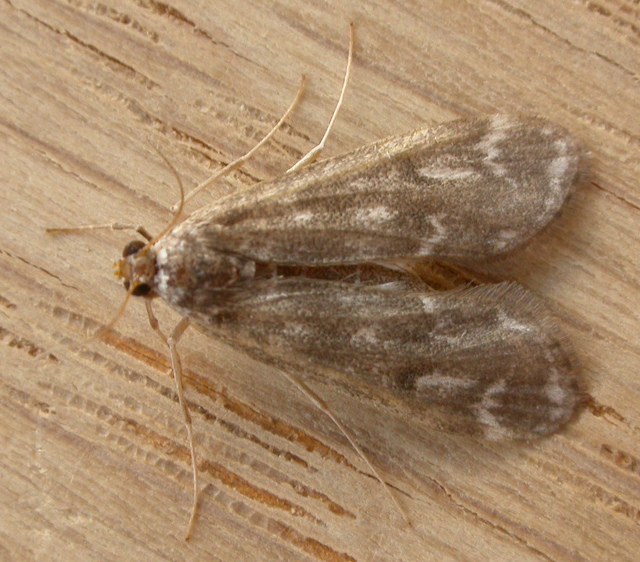
- Hygraula nitens

Scientific classification
- Domain: Eukaryota
- Kingdom: Animalia
- Phylum: Arthropoda
- Class: Insecta
- Order: Lepidoptera
- Family: Crambidae
- Subfamily: Acentropinae
- Genus: Hygraula; Meyrick, 1885

Synonyms
- Blechroglossa Turner, 1937; Blechroglosso Neave, 1950

= Hygraula =

Genus of moths

Hygraula is a genus of moths of the family Crambidae.

== Species ==
- Hygraula nitens (Butler, 1880)
- Hygraula pelochyta (Turner, 1937)
