= Appertiella =

Scientific classification
- Kingdom: Plantae
- Clade: Tracheophytes
- Clade: Angiosperms
- Clade: Monocots
- Order: Alismatales
- Family: Hydrocharitaceae
- Subfamily: Anacharidoideae
- Genus: Appertiella; C.D.K. Cook & Triest
- Species: A. hexandra

Binomial name
- Appertiella hexandra C.D.K. Cook & Triest

Genus of aquatic plants

Appertiella is a genus of an aquatic plant of the family Hydrocharitaceae described as a genus in 1982. There is only one known species, Appertiella hexandra, endemic to Madagascar.
