= Hygraula pelochyta =

Scientific classification
- Kingdom: Animalia
- Phylum: Arthropoda
- Class: Insecta
- Order: Lepidoptera
- Family: Crambidae
- Genus: Hygraula
- Species: H. pelochyta

Binomial name
- Hygraula pelochyta (Turner, 1937)

Synonyms
- Blechroglossa pelochyta Turner, 1937

Species of moth

Hygraula pelochyta is a species of moth in the family Crambidae. It was described by Turner in 1937. It is found in Australia, where it has been recorded from New South Wales.
