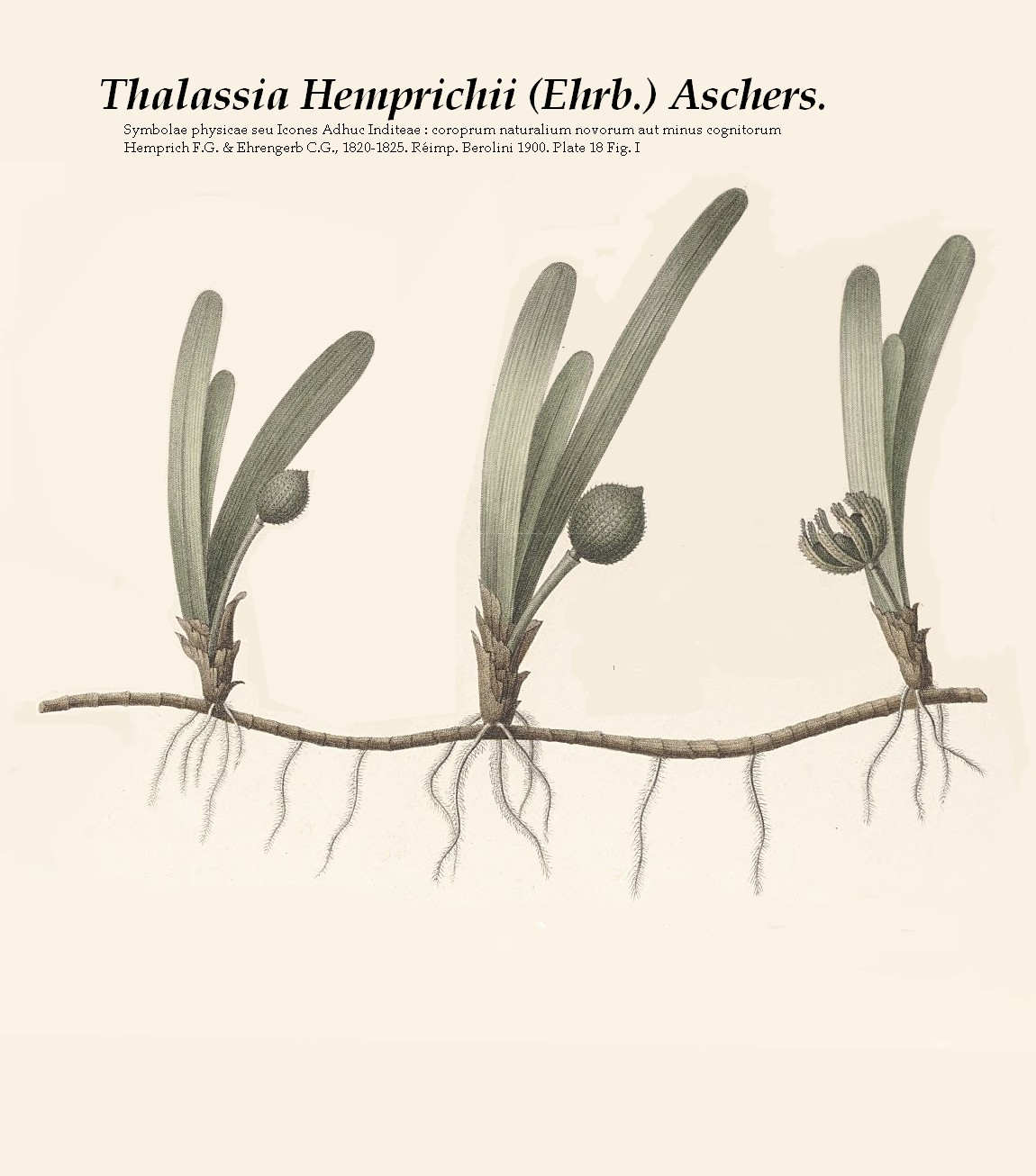
- Botanical illustration
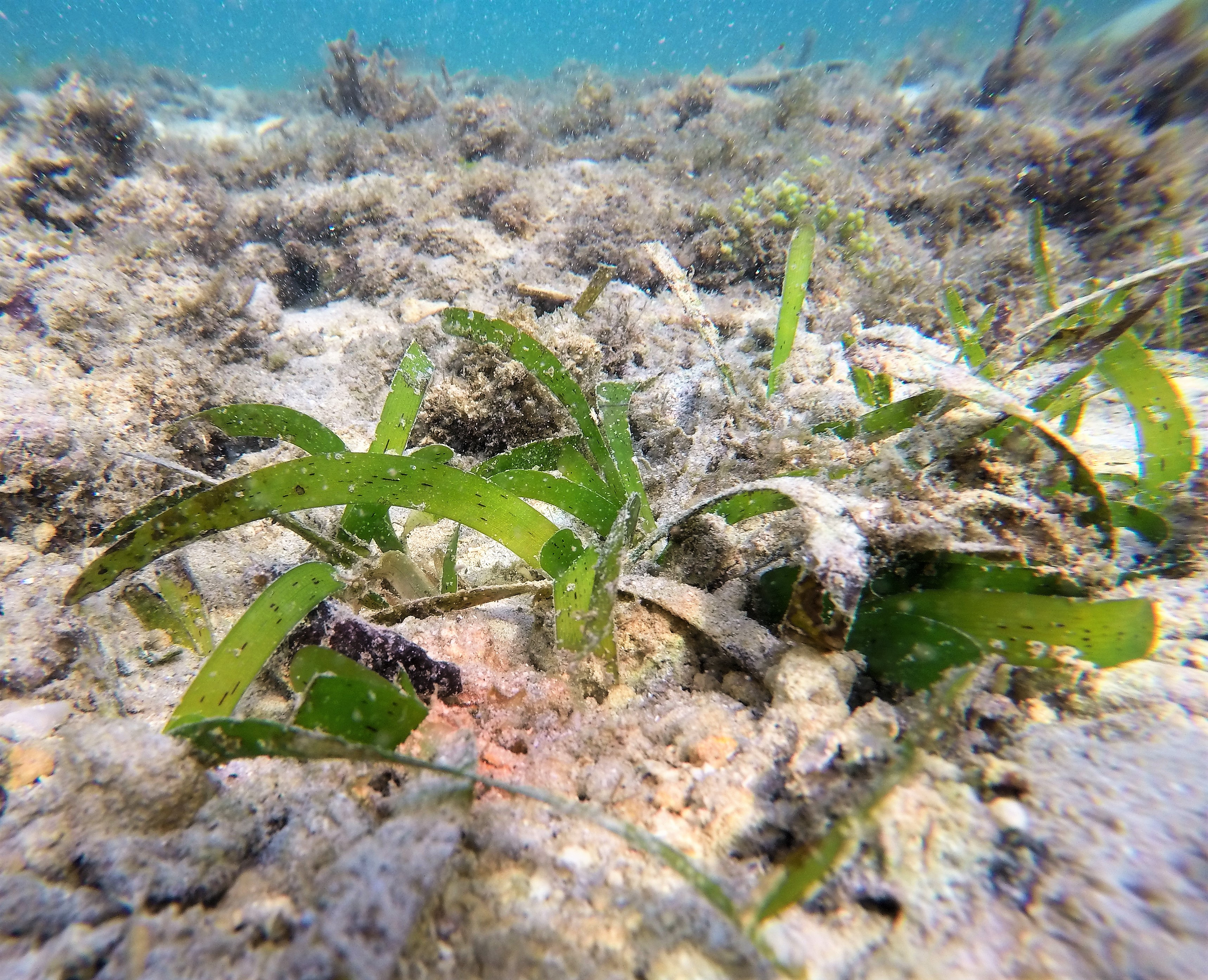
- Leaves

Conservation status
- Least Concern (IUCN 3.1)

Scientific classification
- Kingdom: Plantae
- Clade: Embryophytes
- Clade: Tracheophytes
- Clade: Spermatophytes
- Clade: Angiosperms
- Clade: Monocots
- Order: Alismatales
- Family: Hydrocharitaceae
- Genus: Thalassia
- Species: T. hemprichii

Binomial name
- Thalassia hemprichii (Ehrenb. ex Solms) Asch.

= Thalassia hemprichii =

Species of plant in the genus Thalassia

Thalassia hemprichii, called Pacific turtlegrass, is a widespread species of seagrass in the family Hydrocharitaceae, native to the shores of the Indian Ocean, the Red Sea, and the western Pacific Ocean. Its growth rate increases with CO_{2} enrichment, and it can tolerate lowered light conditions caused by algal blooms, allowing for it to respond positively to ocean acidification and other disturbances.
