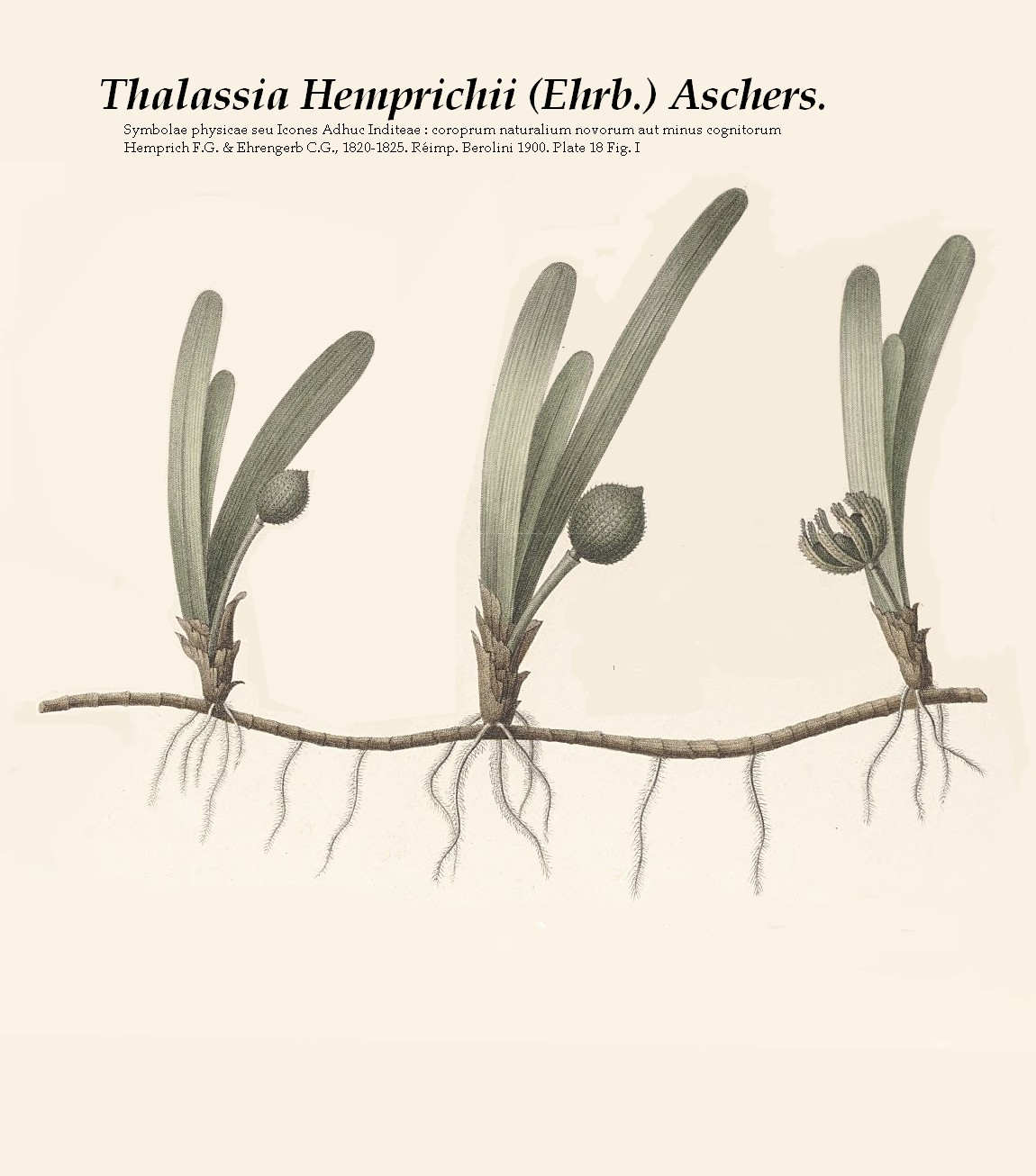
- Thalassia hemprichii

Scientific classification
- Kingdom: Plantae
- Clade: Tracheophytes
- Clade: Angiosperms
- Clade: Monocots
- Order: Alismatales
- Family: Hydrocharitaceae
- Subfamily: Hydrilloideae
- Genus: Thalassia; Banks ex K.D.König

Type species
- Thalassia testudinum Banks ex K.D.König

Synonyms
- Schizotheca Ehrenb.

= Thalassia (plant) =

Genus of aquatic plants

Thalassia is a marine seagrass genus comprising two known species.

== Species ==
- Thalassia hemprichii (Ehrenb.) Asch. - Pacific Turtlegrass (shores of the Western and Central Indo-Pacific)
- Thalassia testudinum (Banks ex K.D.König) - Caribbean Turtlegrass (Gulf of Mexico, Caribbean Sea, and Bermuda)
