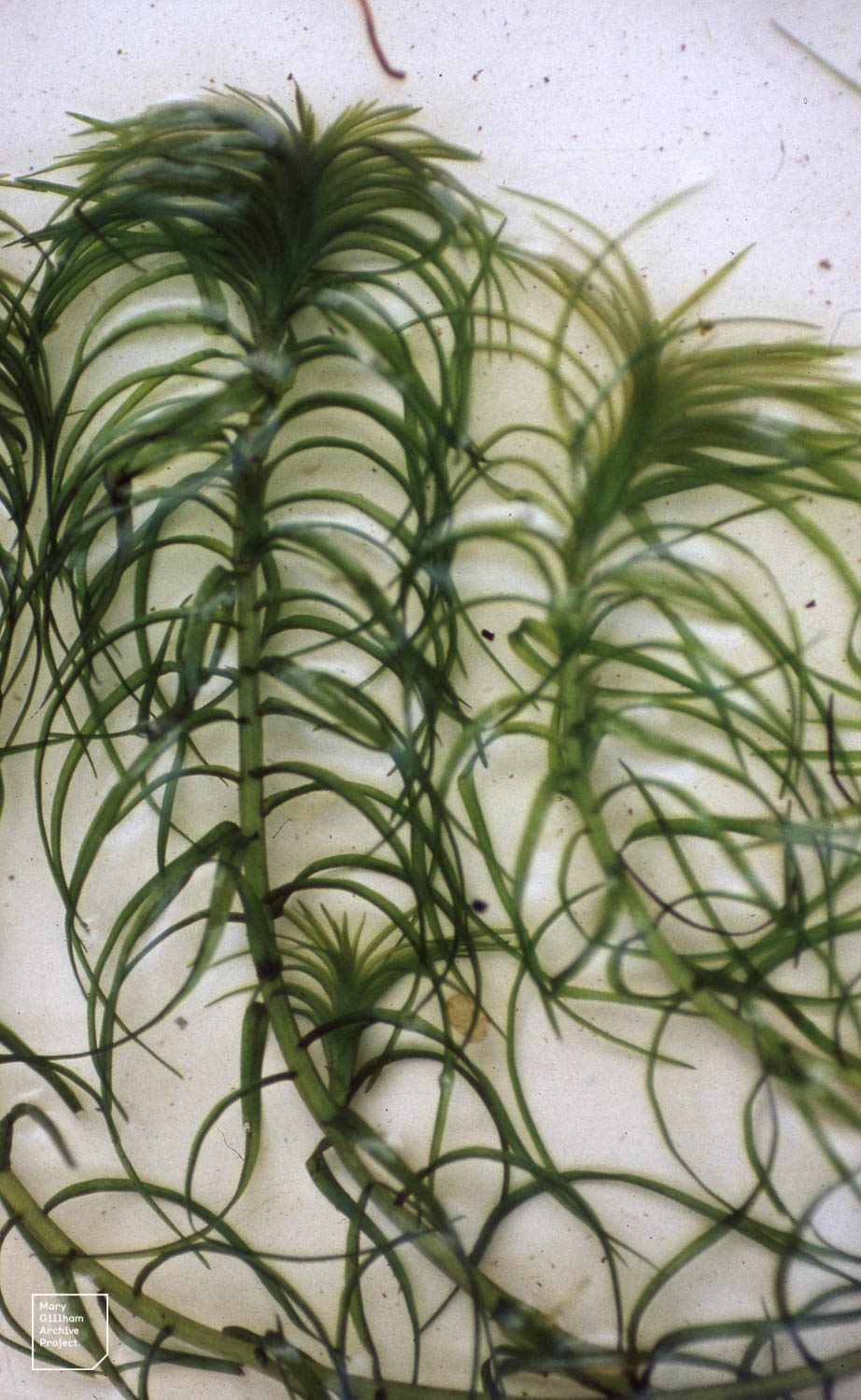
- Lagarosiphon major

Scientific classification
- Kingdom: Plantae
- Clade: Tracheophytes
- Clade: Angiosperms
- Clade: Monocots
- Order: Alismatales
- Family: Hydrocharitaceae
- Subfamily: Anacharioideae
- Genus: Lagarosiphon; Harv.

Species
- See text

= Lagarosiphon =

Genus of plants

Lagarosiphon is a genus of aquatic plants described as a genus in 1841. It is native to Africa and Madagascar. It is dioecious, with male and female flowers produced on separate plants.

== Description ==
These branched, aquatic herbs are covered in leaves. They may have an alternate, sub-opposite or whorled arrangement.

The unisexual flowers are surrounded by auxiliary bracts. The male flowers have a six lobed perianth arranged in two rows. The outer lobes are slightly larger. They have three stamens and two to three staminodes. There are multiple flowers per bract.

The female perianths are also made up of six lobes, with those making up the outer layer also being larger than those of the inner layer. The one chambered ovary has three partial placentas. The style is as long as the perianth tube. There are three stigmas, which may be forked. There is one flower per bract.

== Distribution ==
This genus is most common in tropical Africa.

== Species ==
The following species are accepted:

1. Lagarosiphon cordofanus (Hochst.) Casp. – Cameroon + Ethiopia to Namibia + Mpumalanga
2. Lagarosiphon hydrilloides Rendle – Ghana, Kenya, Uganda
3. Lagarosiphon ilicifolius Oberm. – Uganda to Namibia
4. Lagarosiphon madagascariensis Casp. – Madagascar
5. Lagarosiphon major (Ridl.) Moss – Zimbabwe, Botswana, Lesotho, South Africa
6. Lagarosiphon muscoides Harv. – Mali to Sudan to KwaZulu-Natal
7. Lagarosiphon rubellus Ridl. – Angola
8. Lagarosiphon steudneri Casp. – Ethiopia
9. Lagarosiphon verticillifolius Oberm. – Mozambique, Zimbabwe, KwaZulu-Natal, Eswatini, Mpumalanga, Limpopo
