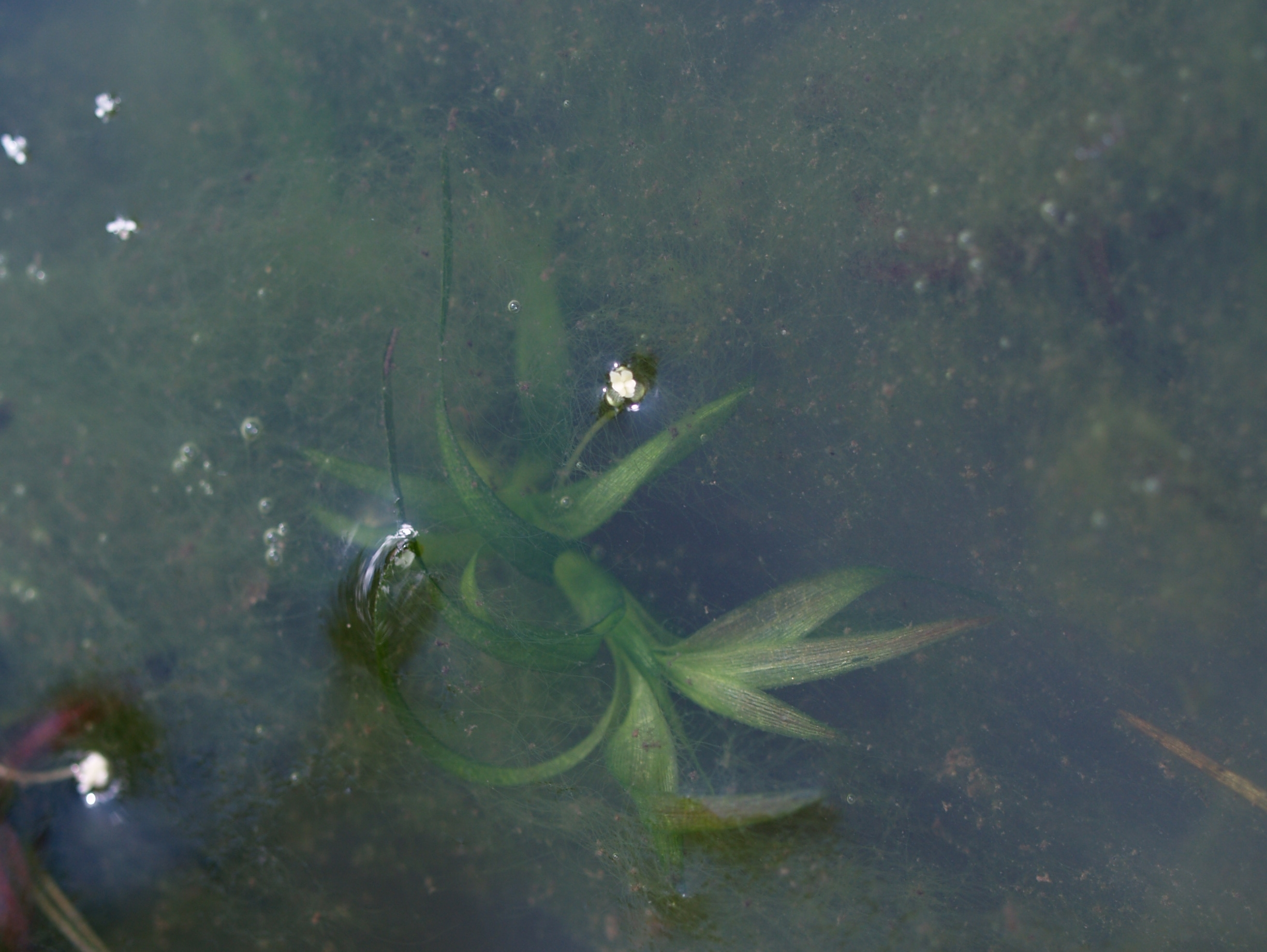

Conservation status
- Least Concern (IUCN 3.1)

Scientific classification
- Kingdom: Plantae
- Clade: Tracheophytes
- Clade: Angiosperms
- Clade: Monocots
- Order: Alismatales
- Family: Hydrocharitaceae
- Subfamily: Hydrilloideae
- Genus: Nechamandra; Planch.
- Species: N. alternifolia

Binomial name
- Nechamandra alternifolia (Roxb. ex Wight) Thwaites

Synonyms
- Vallisneria alternifolia Roxb. ex Wight; Lagarosiphon alternifolia (Roxb. ex Wight) Druce; Nechamandra roxburghii Planch.; Lagarosiphon roxburghii (Planch.) Benth.

= Nechamandra =

Genus of flowering plants

Nechamandra is a monotypic genus of an aquatic plant family Hydrocharitaceae. The sole species is Nechamandra alternifolia. It is found in slow moving fresh water.

== Distribution and habitat ==
This is a rare plant in lakes and ponds. It is known from Asian fresh waters of Sudan, Socotra, Sri Lanka, India, Nepal, Bangladesh, China, Myanmar, Thailand, and Vietnam.

== Chromosome number ==
Chromosome numbers of 2n = 14 is reported from India and Myanmar.
