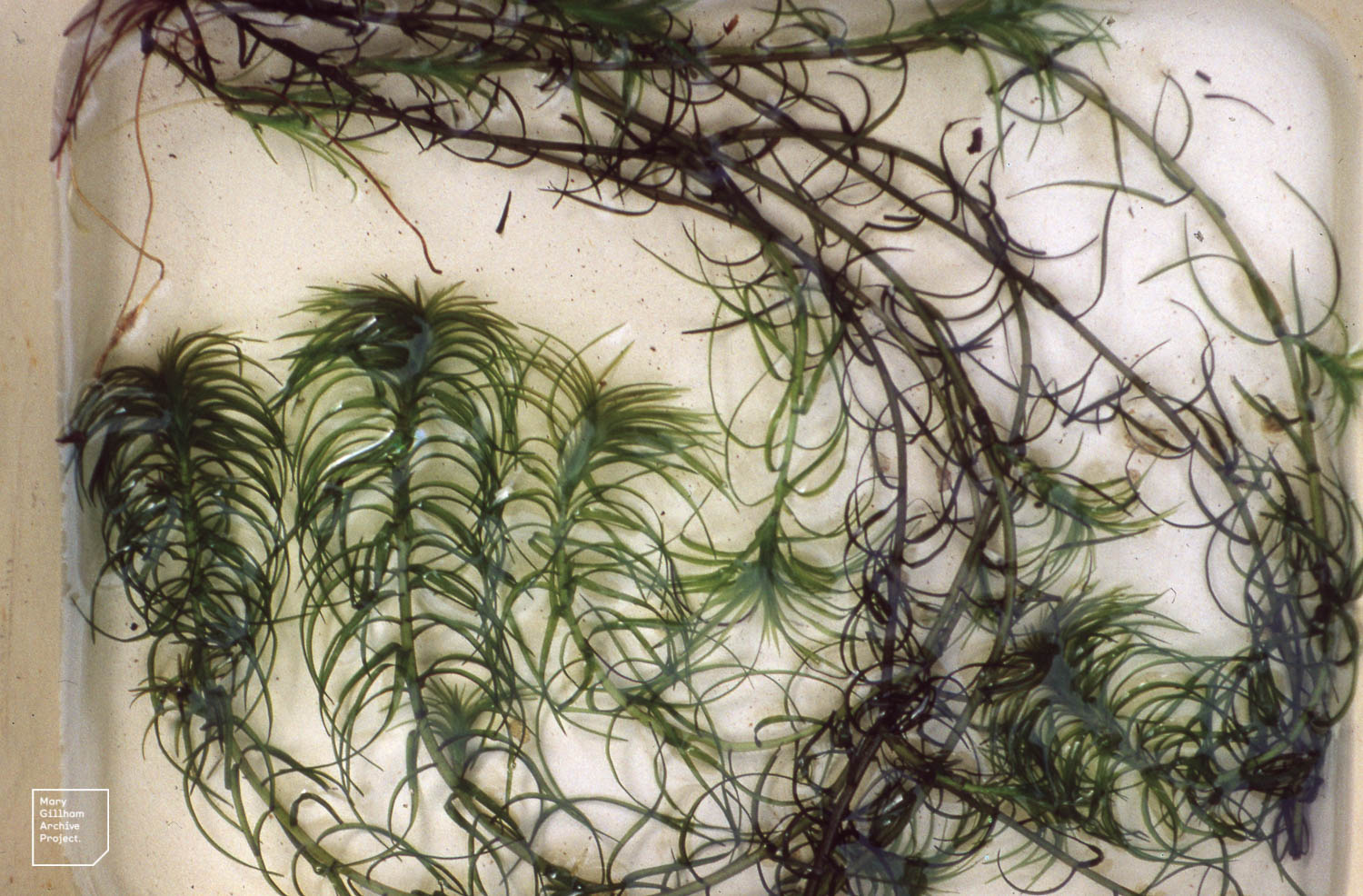

Scientific classification
- Kingdom: Plantae
- Clade: Tracheophytes
- Clade: Angiosperms
- Clade: Monocots
- Order: Alismatales
- Family: Hydrocharitaceae
- Genus: Lagarosiphon
- Species: L. major

Binomial name
- Lagarosiphon major Ridl. Moss ex Wager

Synonyms
- Elodea crispa

= Lagarosiphon major =

Species of aquatic plant

Lagarosiphon major is a monocotic aquatic plant native to Southern Africa. Common names include African elodea, curly waterweed, oxygen weed and South African oxygen weed. It is used as freshwater aquarium plant.

It is an invasive plant in some countries. It is classed as a noxious weed in the United States. It was first reported in New Zealand in 1950 and it is listed on the National Pest Plant Accord. Lagarosiphon major was added to the European Union's List of Invasive Alien Species of Union concern on 3 August 2016, meaning that – amongst other things – it is illegal to sell it anywhere in the European Union or to dump it in the environment.

== Distribution ==
In Ireland, it is found in County Galway in parts of upper Lough Corrib. In New Zealand, it has naturalised across waterways in the North Island and it is locally abundant and spreading in parts of the South Island.
