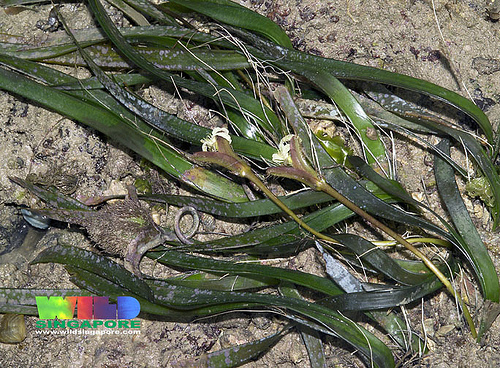

Conservation status
- Least Concern (IUCN 3.1)

Scientific classification
- Kingdom: Plantae
- Clade: Tracheophytes
- Clade: Angiosperms
- Clade: Monocots
- Order: Alismatales
- Family: Hydrocharitaceae
- Genus: Enhalus; Rich.
- Species: E. acoroides

Binomial name
- Enhalus acoroides (L.f.) Royle

Synonyms
- Stratiotes acoroides L.f.; Enhalus koenigii Rich.; Vallisneria sphaerocarpa Blanco; Enhalus marinus Griff.

= Enhalus =

Genus of aquatic plants

Enhalus is a monotypic genus of marine flowering plants. The sole species is Enhalus acoroides. Enhalus is a large seagrass native to coastal waters of the tropical Indian and Western Pacific Oceans. It is the only species of seagrass that does aerial surface pollination in which the pollen and the styles remain dry. Enhalus is surface pollinated with male flowers that detach from the plant to float on the surface until they reach a female flower where pollination can occur. Enhalus acoroides is considered a slow-growing, "climax" species.

== Description ==
Enhalus acoroides has massive rhizomes (1.5 cm in diameter) that help it stay anchored in soft mud substrates, withstanding wave action and tidal currents. Its long strap-like leaves (30–150 cm) make up a significant volume of total plant biomass of shallow water seagrass beds. Due to the large structure of the leaves and their placement in the water column, they provide greater surfaces for Epibiont organisms to inhabit. Fruit are round and large (4–6 cm in diameter) with dark, ribbed skin and 6-7 white seeds. The male plant bears a single pedunculate inflorescence or stem containing clusters of flowers, each is highly reduced in form to a small free floating device. Female Enhalus acoroides bear only a single inflorescence, but the peduncle of a female flower is much longer.

== Distribution and habitat ==
Enhalus acoroides is a littoral species living on coral substrates or in shallow soft substrates like mud and sand, depending on region. It can be found as far east as Papua New Guinea and can range from the Red Sea south to northern Mozambique in the Indian Ocean. It grows in single-species meadows and in mixed meadows of seagrasses mainly with Thallassia hemprichii, where it comprises 90% of the meadow biomass. Enhalus acoroides grows best just above the level of mean low water springs and grows to generally 4 meters deep.

== Reproduction ==
Enhalus acoroides is dioecious and able to reproduce sexually and asexually. Enhalus acoroides create small isolated patches containing 25 to 200 shoots through lateral rhizome spreading. It can also produce pollen like other seagrasses but it is unique in that it is the only species of seagrasses that surface pollinates. During this process, the male flower will break off from the spathe and rise to the surface where it has numerous flowers inside its hydrophobic inflorescences. Once at the surface it will release its pollen to a female inflorescence where it has reached the surface of the water by means of an elongated stalk surface. The developing fruit is drawn under the water to finish ripening. Flowering is a year round phenomenon and the amount of flowers being produced are strongly related to variations in mean water temperatures.
