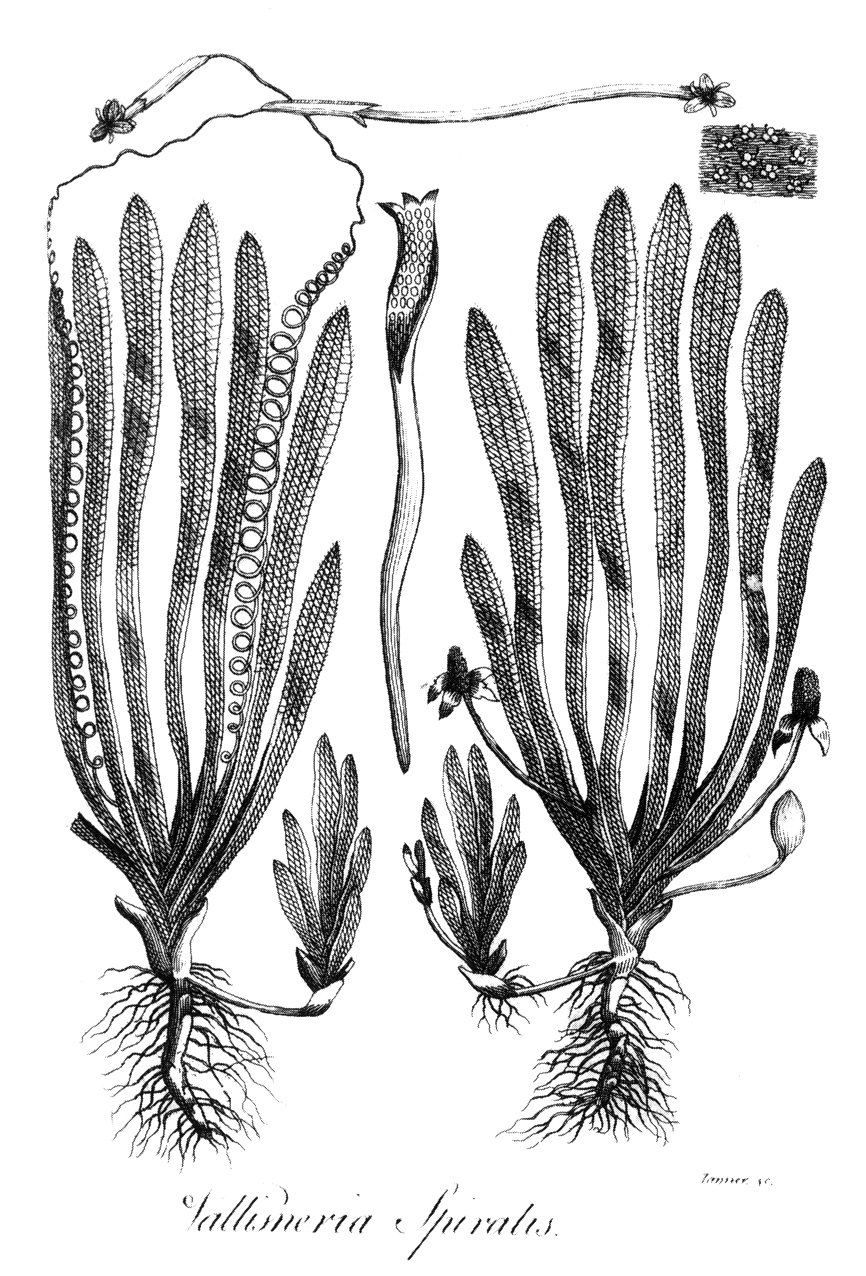
- Vallisneria spiralis

Scientific classification
- Kingdom: Plantae
- Clade: Tracheophytes
- Clade: Angiosperms
- Clade: Monocots
- Order: Alismatales
- Family: Hydrocharitaceae
- Subfamily: Hydrilloideae
- Genus: Vallisneria; L.

Synonyms
- Physkium Lour.; Maidenia Rendle

= Vallisneria =

eelgrass or tape grass

Genus of aquatic plants

Vallisneria (named in honor of Antonio Vallisneri) is a genus of freshwater aquatic plant, commonly called eelgrass, tape grass or vallis. The genus is widely distributed in tropical and subtropical regions of Asia, Africa, Australia, Europe, and North America.

Vallisneria is a submerged plant that spreads by runners and sometimes forms tall underwater meadows. Leaves arise in clusters from their roots. The leaves have rounded tips, and definite raised veins. Single white female flowers grow to the water surface on very long stalks. Male flowers grow on short stalks, become detached, and float to the surface. It is dioecious, with male and female flowers on separate plants. The fruit is a banana-like capsule having many tiny seeds.

Sometimes it is confused with the superficially similar Sagittaria when grown submerged.

This plant should not be confused with Zostera species, marine seagrasses that are usually also given the common name "eelgrass". Vallisneria has arched stems which cross over small obstacles and develop small planters at their nodes.

== Use in aquaria ==
Various strains of Vallisneria are commonly kept in tropical and subtropical aquaria. These include dwarf forms such as Vallisneria tortifolia, a variety with leaves around 15 to 20 cm in length and characterised by having thin, tightly coiled leaves. A medium-sized variety, Vallisneria spiralis is also very popular, typically having leaves 30 to 60 cm in length. The largest varieties are often called Vallisneria gigantea regardless of their actual taxonomic designation; most of the plants sold as Vallisneria gigantea are actually Vallisneria americana. Similarly, some Vallisneria gigantea are sold as Vallisneria spiralis and these giant varieties are only suitable for very large tanks, having leaves that frequently exceed 1 m in length, but are quite hardy and will do well in tanks with big fish that might uproot more delicate aquarium plants.

With few exceptions, the commonly traded Vallisneria are tolerant and adaptable. While they do best under bright illumination they will do well under moderate lighting as well, albeit with slower growth rates. They are not picky about substrate, and will accept plain gravel provided an iron-rich fertiliser is added to the water periodically. Once settled in, they multiply readily through the production of daughter plants at the end of runners (as mentioned above). Once they have established their own roots, these daughter plants can be cut away and transplanted if necessary. Vallisneria will accept neutral to alkaline water conditions (they do not like very acidic conditions) and do not require carbon dioxide fertilization. They are also among the few commonly traded aquarium plants that tolerate brackish water, provided the specific gravity does not exceed 1.003 (around 10 percent the salinity of normal sea water).

== Literature and culture ==
In L'Intelligence des fleurs (The Intelligence of the Flowers), Nobel laureate Maurice Maeterlinck draws conclusions about vegetal intelligence from the reproductive strategy of Vallisneria, which he describes at length:

"The Vallisneria is a rather insignificant herb, possessing none of the strange grace of the Water-lily or of certain submersed comas . But it seems as though nature had delighted in giving it a beautiful idea. The whole existence of the little plant is spent at the bottom of the water, in a sort of half-slumber, until the moment of the wedding hour in which it aspires to a new life. Then the female flower slowly uncoils the long spiral of its peduncle, rises, emerges and floats and blossoms on the surface of the pond. From a neighbouring stem, the male flowers, which see it through the sunlit water, soar in their turn, full of hope, towards the one that rocks, that awaits them, that calls them to a magic world. But, when they have come half-way, they feel themselves suddenly held back: their stalk, the very source of their life, is too short; they will never reach the abode of light, the only spot in which the union of the stamens and the pistil can be achieved ! . . Is there any more cruel inadvertence or ordeal in nature? Picture the tragedy of that longing, the inaccessible so nearly attained, the transparent fatality, the impossible with not a visible obstacle ! ... It would be insoluble, like our own tragedy upon this earth, were it not that an unexpected element is mingled with it. Did the males foresee the disillusion to which they would be subjected? One thing is certain, that they have locked up in their hearts a bubble of air, even as we lock up in our souls a thought of desperate deliverance. It is as though they hesitated for a moment; then, with a magnificent effort, the finest, the most supernatural that I know of in the annals of the insects and the flowers, in order to rise to happiness they deliberately break the bond that attaches them to life. They tear themselves from their peduncle and, with an incomparable flight, amid pearly beads of gladness, their petals dart up and break the surface of the water. Wounded to death, but radiant and free, they float for a moment beside their heedless brides and the union is accomplished, whereupon the victims drift away to perish, while the wife, already a mother, closes her corolla, in which lives their last breath, rolls up her spiral and descends to the depths, there to ripen the fruit of the heroic kiss."

== Species ==
Accepted species

- Vallisneria americana – North America incl West Indies, Colombia
- Vallisneria anhuiensis – Anhui
- Vallisneria annua – Australia
- Vallisneria australis – Australia
- Vallisneria caulescens – Australia
- Vallisneria densiserrulata – China, Japan
- Vallisneria erecta – Queensland
- Vallisneria longipedunculata – Anhui
- Vallisneria nana – Philippines, New Guinea, N Australia, New Caledonia
- Vallisneria natans – China, Japan, Korea, Primorye, Vietnam, India, Nepal, Iraq
- Vallisneria neotropicalis – North America incl West Indies
- Vallisneria rubra – northern Western Australia
- Vallisneria spinulosa – China
- Vallisneria spiralis – S + E Europe, W + S + SW Asia, Africa
- Vallisneria triptera – N Australia

== Gallery ==
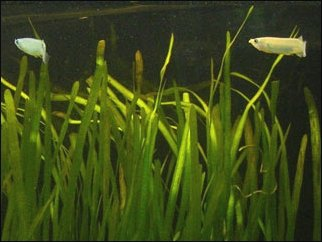
Vallisneria gigantea in a tropical fish tank (with freshwater Nomorhamphus liemi halfbeaks)

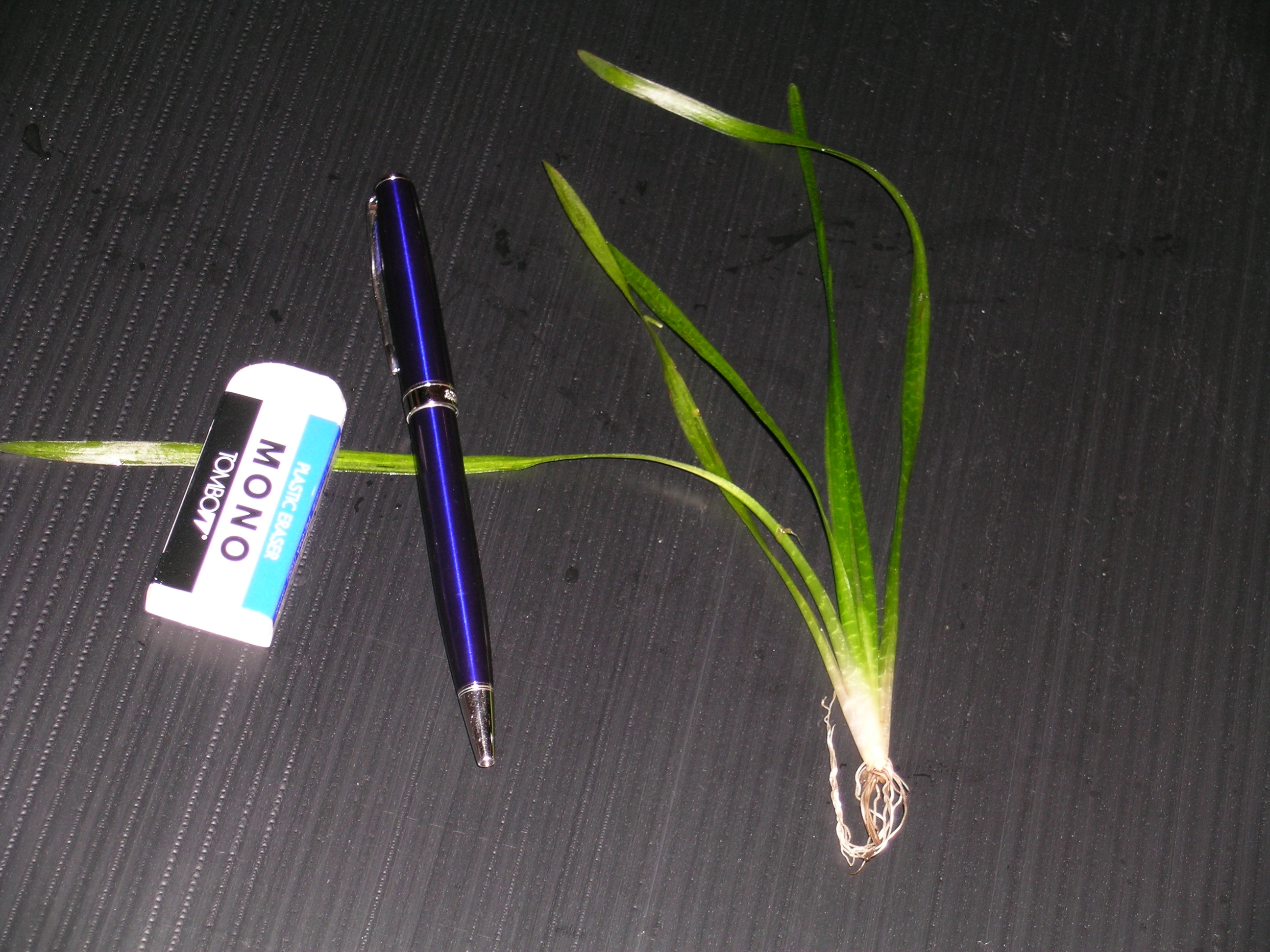
"Corkscrew vallis". Originally in Lake Biwa, Japan.
Also cultivated by farm in Southeast Asia.
