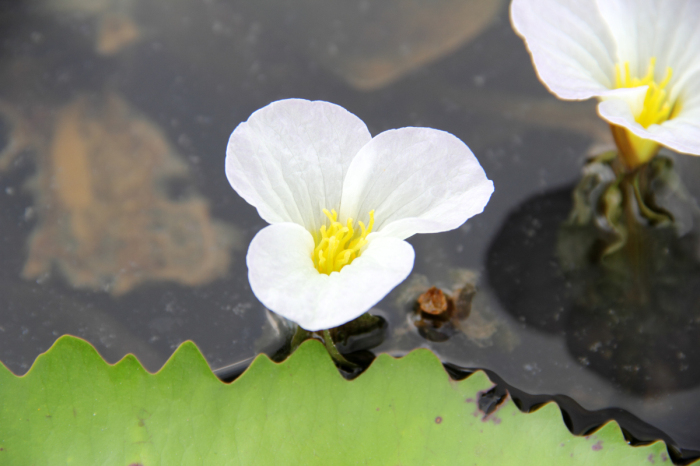

Conservation status
- Least Concern (IUCN 3.1)

Scientific classification
- Kingdom: Plantae
- Clade: Embryophytes
- Clade: Tracheophytes
- Clade: Spermatophytes
- Clade: Angiosperms
- Clade: Monocots
- Order: Alismatales
- Family: Hydrocharitaceae
- Genus: Ottelia
- Species: O. alismoides

Binomial name
- Ottelia alismoides (L.) Pers.

Synonyms
- Damasonium alismoides (L.) R.Br.; Stratiotes alismoides L.

= Ottelia alismoides =

Species of flowering plant

Ottelia alismoides, commonly known as duck lettuce, is a species of aquatic plant native to Asia and northern Australia. Due to habitat loss and deterioration, it is endangered in China and Japan, although it is an invasive weed in America. Its genome has also been sequenced, resulting in a 6.45 Gb assembly to help study its unusual carbon metabolism mechanisms and aid in genetic conservation.
