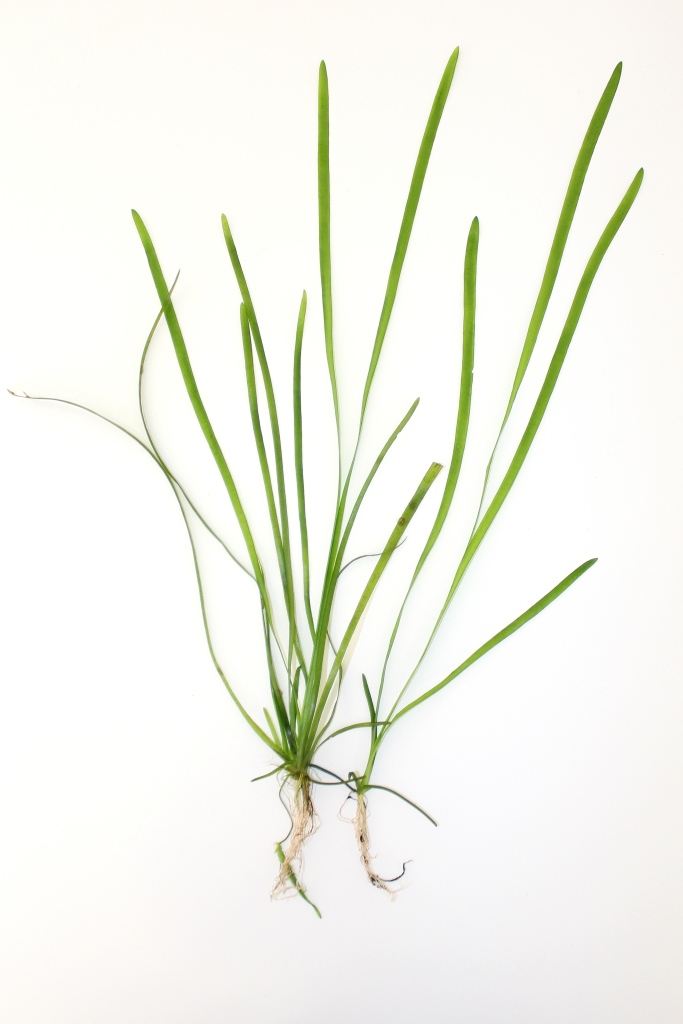

Conservation status
- Least Concern (IUCN 3.1)

Scientific classification
- Kingdom: Plantae
- Clade: Tracheophytes
- Clade: Angiosperms
- Clade: Monocots
- Order: Alismatales
- Family: Hydrocharitaceae
- Genus: Vallisneria
- Species: V. spiralis

Binomial name
- Vallisneria spiralis L.

Synonyms
- Vallisneria gracilis; Vallisneria physicum; Vallisneria caulescens

= Vallisneria spiralis =

Species of aquatic plant

Vallisneria spiralis, also known as straight vallisneria, tape grass, or eel grass is a common aquarium plant that prefers good light and a nutrient rich substrate. In the wild, it can be found in tropical and sub-tropical regions worldwide.

== Overview ==
It has narrow, linear leaves that range in colour from a pale-green to reddish up to 3 feet (1 m) long and up to 0.75 inches broad. V. spiralis is monoecious with male flowers carried on long spiral stalks that break away from the plant and float on the water's surface. In the variety V. s. gigantea the female flowers are on stalks (pedicels) up to six feet (1.85 meters) in length. After the female flowers have been pollinated, the pedicel curls up like a tendril, drawing the young fruit closer to the bed of the stream or pond; thus the name "spiralis". Seeds have not been observed germinating in aquaria. Instead, it most often propagates by runners which can lead to dense stands..

It can be eaten when steamed or boiled.

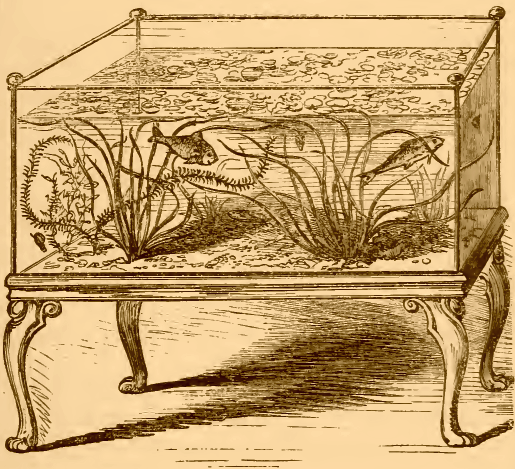
Vallisneria spiralis was already being used as an aquarium plant in 1856, as shown in this illustration from that time.

One form of this plant has been described: V. spiralis f. tortifolia, which has also been elevated to the species level by some taxonomists under the name V. tortissima. The form has tightly twisted leaves. Along with this form, many other trade names have been developed for small variations on the species. Their taxonomic status is uncertain.

== Invasive species ==
The species is an effective invader due to its efficient dispersal, vegetative reproduction, high biomass production, and popularity in the aquarium trade. V. spiralis is an "unwanted organism" in New Zealand. It is listed on the National Pest Plant Accord prohibiting it from sale and commercial propagation and distribution. Since 2013 V. spiralis has been listed as a naturalized alien in Iceland, where it was recorded in geothermal ponds.
