= Christopher David Kentish Cook =

British botanist (born 1933)

- Born: 1933
- Known for: Taxonomy and biology of aquatic plants
- Awards: David Fairchild Medal for Plant Exploration (2001)
- Scientific career
- Fields: Botany, Aquatic ecology
- Author abbrev. (botany): C.D.K.Cook

Christopher David Kentish Cook (born 1933) was a British botanist.

Publications included work in aquatic plants. He worked in Italy, in general aquatic ecology, and India. He was awarded the David Fairchild Medal for Plant Exploration in 2001, recognising his "research on biology and classification of aquatic plants".
