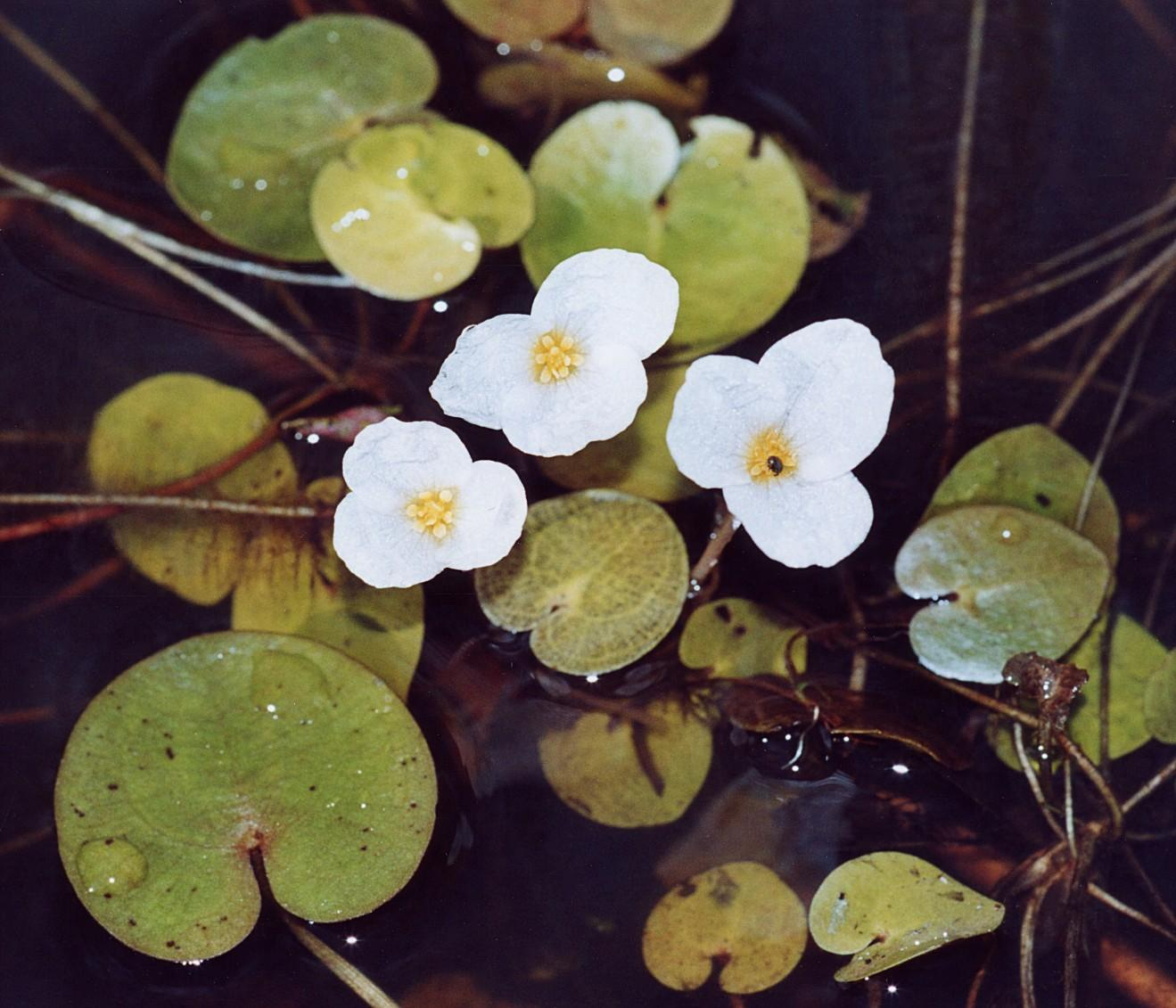
- Common frogbit, Hydrocharis morsus-ranae

Scientific classification
- Kingdom: Plantae
- Clade: Tracheophytes
- Clade: Angiosperms
- Clade: Monocots
- Order: Alismatales
- Family: Hydrocharitaceae; Juss.

Genera
- Appertiella C.D.K.Cook & L.Triest; Blyxa Noronha ex Thouars; Elodea Michx.; Enhalus Rich.; Halophila Thouars; Hydrilla Rich.; Hydrocharis L.; Lagarosiphon Harv.; Najas L.; Nechamandra Planch.; Ottelia Pers.; Stratiotes L.; Thalassia Banks & Sol. ex K.D.Koenig; Vallisneria P.Micheli ex L.

Synonyms
- Najadaceae Juss.

= Hydrocharitaceae =

Family of aquatic plants

Hydrocharitaceae is a flowering plant family which includes 14 accepted genera and a total of ca 135 known species (Christenhusz & Byng 2016). The family holds a number of species of aquatic plants, including tape-grass, the well-known Canadian waterweed, and frogbit.

The family includes both freshwater and marine aquatics. They are found throughout the world in a wide variety of habitats, but are primarily tropical.

== Description ==
The species are annual or perennial, with a creeping monopodial rhizome with the leaves arranged in two vertical rows, or an erect main shoot with roots at the base and spirally arranged or whorled leaves. The leaves are simple and usually found submerged, though they may be found floating or partially emerse. As with many aquatics they can be quite variable in shape – from linear to orbicular, with or without a petiole, and with or without a sheathing base.

The flowers are arranged in a forked, spathe-like bract or between two opposite bracts. They are usually irregular, though in some case they may be slightly irregular, and either bisexual or unisexual. The perianth segments are in 1 or 2 series of 2–3 free segments; the inner series when present are usually showy and petal-like. Stamens 1–numerous, in 1 or more series; the inner ones sometimes sterile. pollen grains are globular and free but in the marine genera (Thalassia and Halophila) – the pollen grains are carried in chains, like strings of beads. The ovary is inferior with 2–15 united carpels containing a single locule with numerous ovules on parietal placentas which either protrude nearly to the centre of the ovary or are incompletely developed. Fruits are globular to linear, dry or pulpy, dehiscent or more usually indehiscent and opening by decay of the pericarp. Seeds are normally numerous with straight embryos and no endosperm.

Pollination can be extremely specialised.

The most recent phylogenetic treatment of the family recognizes four subfamilies.

- Subfamily Anacharioideae (Appertiella, Blyxa, Egeria, Elodea, Lagarosiphon and Ottelia)
- Subfamily Hydrilloideae (Enhalus, Halophila, Hydrilla, Maidenia, Najas, Nechamandra, Thalassia and Vallisneria).
- Subfamily Hydrocharitoideae (Hydrocharis, Limnobium)
- Subfamily Stratiotoideae (Stratiotes)

- Hydrocharitaceae
  - - - Hydrilloideae
        - - - - Enhalus
              - Thalassia
            - Halophila
          - - - - Vallisneria
              - Nechamandra
            - Hydrilla
        - Najas
      - Hydrocharitoideae
        - Limnobium
        - Hydrocharis
    - Anacharioideae
      - - - - - Elodea
            - Egeria
          - Appertiella
        - - Ottelia
          - Blyxa
      - Lagarosiphon
  - Stratiotoideae
    Stratiotes

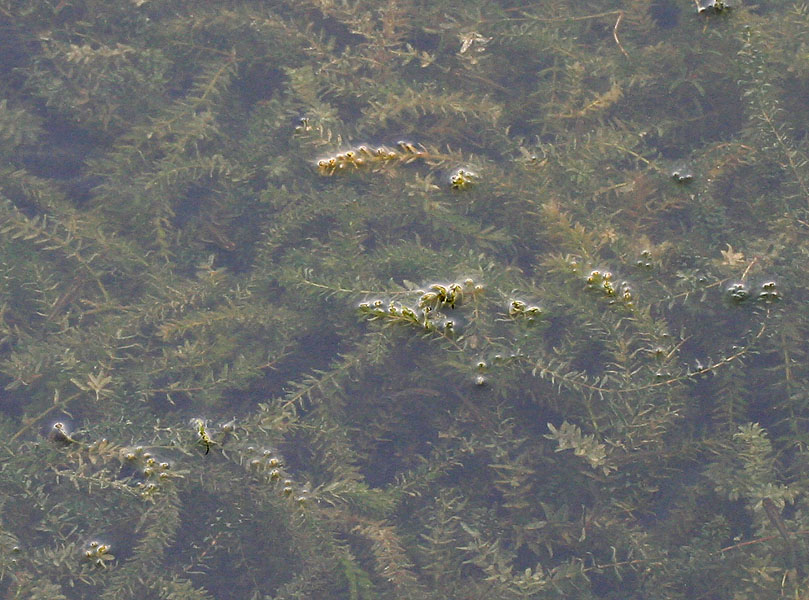
Hydrilla verticillata

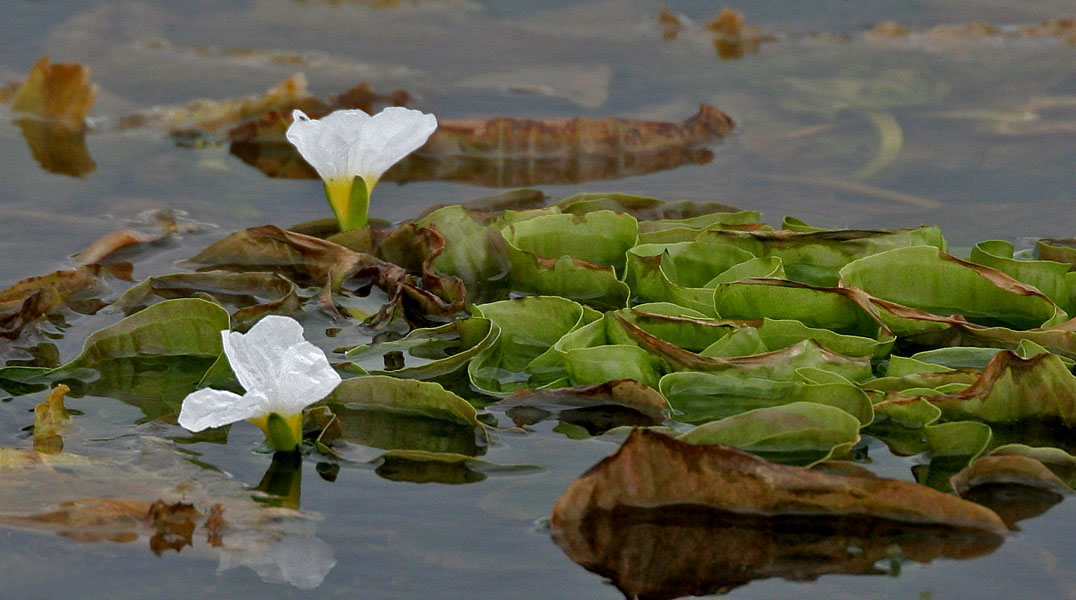
Ottelia alismoides

== Uses ==
Some species have become established ornamental plants, and subsequently serious weeds in the wild (especially Egeria, Elodea and Hydrilla).

== Genera ==
14 genera are currently accepted.

- Appertiella C.D.K.Cook & L.Triest
- Blyxa Noronha ex Thouars
- Elodea Michx. (synonyms Apalanthe Planch. and Egeria Planch.)
- Enhalus Rich.
- Halophila Thouars
- Hydrilla Rich.
- Hydrocharis L. (synonym Limnobium Rich.)
- Lagarosiphon Harv.
- Najas L.
- Nechamandra Planch.
- Ottelia Pers.
- Stratiotes L.
- Thalassia Banks & Sol. ex K.D.Koenig
- Vallisneria P.Micheli ex L. (synonym Maidenia Rendle)

Genera crosses (Hydrocharitaceae)
Kubitzki (ed. 1998)	data.kew	APWeb (mobot.org)	Watson & Dallwitz (delta-intkey)
Hydrocharitaceae
1. Ottelia	Ottelia Pers. (including Beneditaea Toledo, Boottia Wall.) (excludes Oligolobos Gagnep.)	Ottelia Persoon (including Beneditaea Toledo, Boottia Wallich, Oligolobos Gagnepain, Xystrolobos Gagnepain)	Ottelia
2. Stratiotes	Stratiotes L.	Stratiotes L.	Stratiotes
3. Hydrocharis	Hydrocharis L.	Hydrocharis L.	Hydrocharis
4. Limnobium	Limnobium Rich. (including Hydromystria G.Mey.	Limnobium Richard (including Hydromystria G. Meyer)	Limnobium
5. Blyxa	Blyxa Noronha ex Thouars (excludes Enhydrias Ridl.)	Blyxa Richard (including Enhydrias Ridley)	Blyxa
6. Apalanthe	Apalanthe Planch.	(in Elodea Michaux)	Apalanthe
7. Egeria	Egeria Planch.	Egeria Planchon	Egeria
8. Elodea	Elodea Michx. (including Anacharis Rich., Udora Nutt.)	Elodea Michaux (including Anacharis Richard, Apalanthe Planchon, Hydora Besser, Philotria Rafinesque, Serpicula Pursh, Udora Nuttall)	Elodea
9. Hydrilla	Hydrilla Rich.	Hydrilla Richard	Hydrilla
10. Appertiella	Appertiella C.D.K.Cook & Triest	Appertiella C. D. K. Cook & Triest	Appertiella
11. Lagarosiphon	Lagarosiphon Harv.	Lagarosiphon Harvey	Lagarosiphon
12. Nechamandra	Nechamandra Planch.	Nechamandra Planchon	Nechamandra
13. Maidenia	Maidenia Rendle	Maidenia Rendle	Maidenia
14. Vallisneria	Vallisneria L.	Vallisneria L.	Vallisneria
15. Enhalus	Enhalus Rich.	Enhalus Richard	Enhalus
16. Thalassia	Thalassia Banks ex C.Koenig	Thalassia C. Koenig	Thalassia
17. Halophila	Halophila Thouars	Halophila Thouars	Halophila
(in Najas, Najadaceae)	Najas L.	Najas L.	(in Najas, Najadaceae)
(name not found)	Enhydrias Ridl.	(in Blyxa, Hydrocharitaceae)	(name not found)
(name not found)	Oligolobos Gagnep.	(in Ottelia, Hydrocharitaceae)	(name not found)
Najadaceae
1. Najas	(in Najas, Hydrocharitaceae)	(in Najas, Hydrocharitaceae)	Najas
