= List of world records held by plants =

Records held by plant species

The following article contains world records which have been awarded to plants, for both individual plants as well as overall records held by a species.

== Flower ==
=== Largest flowers ===
==== Individual flower ====
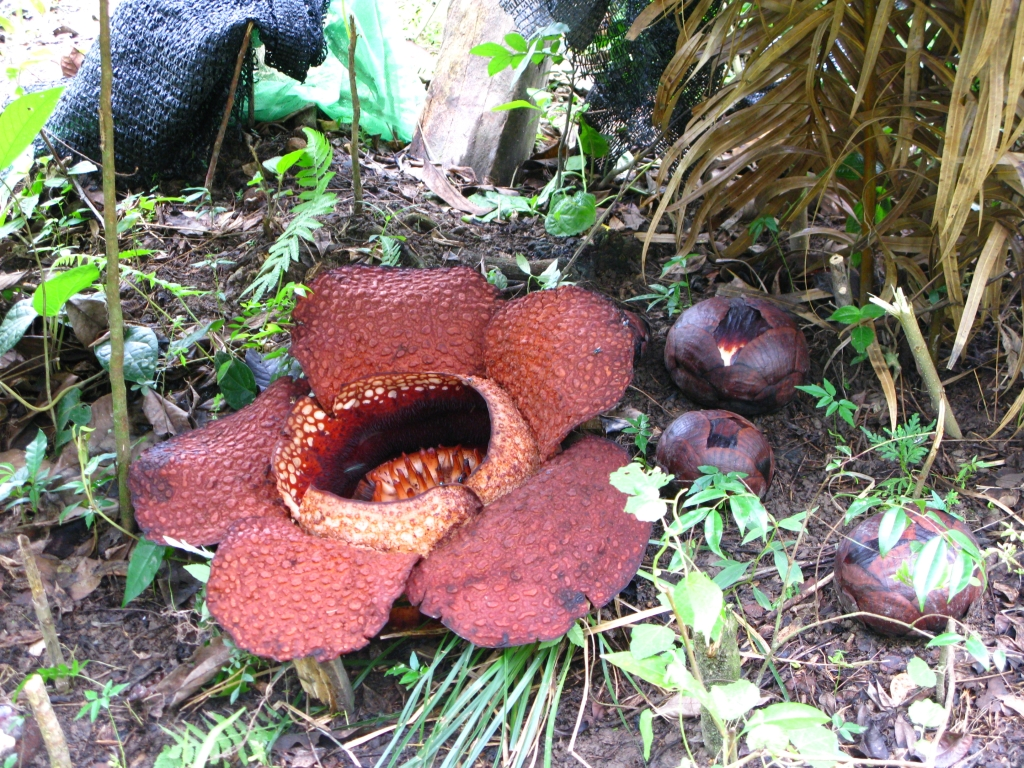
Rafflesia arnoldii, the world largest flower in Bengkulu - Indonesia

With a flower growing up to 1.5 m (5 ft) in diameter, 3–4 m (10–13 ft) in perimeter and 10–12 kg (22–26 lb) in weight, Rafflesia arnoldii is the world's current largest individual flower. They grow in the forests of Sumatra and Borneo islands of Indonesia. With no roots, stems, leaves or chlorophyll, they are parasitic to many species of wild East Indian grapes (Tetrastigma spp) on the roots and stems of their vine. This made Rafflesia very hard to place in scientific taxonomy compared to other plant species. DNA analyses have shown that they belong to the family Euphorbiaceae (sensu lato) but they are usually placed in a family of their own (Rafflesiaceae). The most famous plant species in this family are Spurges, Cassava, and rubber tree. The very existence of the plant can only become visible when its plump buds emerge from the host through the bark on parts of the host tree, out of the ground, when it ripens, and excretes a fleshy scent of corpse to attract pollinators, which are carrion-flies.

=== Longest flower ===
The world's longest flower is the pelican flower (Aristolochia grandiflora) in the family Aristolochiaceae. It is widespread in southern Mexico, Central America and the West Indies. The flower, a greatly expanded calyx, is up to 50 cm (20 in) wide with a bulbous, globular shape, with one sepal extending up to 3 m (10 ft), or possibly even to 4 m (13 ft) in length. while being only 1 cm wide. It is also by a wide margin the largest single sepal known.

=== Smallest flower ===
Balanophora involucrata of the Himalayas has a capitate inflorescence with myriads of tiny flowers each measuring only 25 micrometres wide. The capitulum can contain as many as ten million (10,000,000) florets. Each floret weighs approximately seven micrograms.

=== Smallest complete flower ===
A complete flower is one having all four of the basic organs; sepals, petals, stamens and carpels. Parish's wild buckwheat (Eriogonum parishii) in the family Polygonaceae, native to Upper and Baja California, has pink, trimerous flowers with 3 sepals, 3 petals, 3 stamens and a pistil of three carpels, yet it measures only 0.6 mm long.

==== Inflorescence ====
===== Branched inflorescence =====
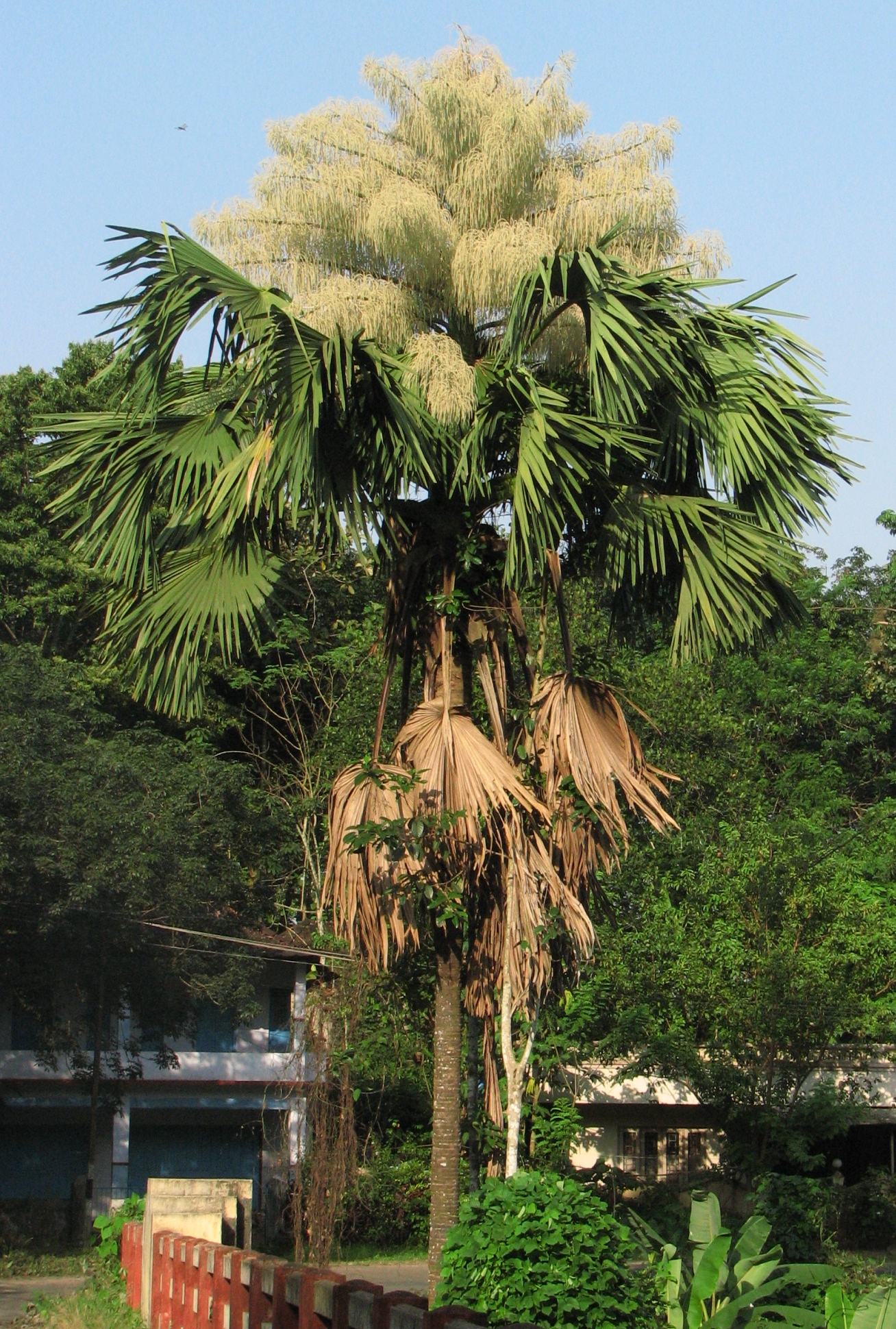
Corypha umbraculifera

Corypha umbraculifera, also known as the "talipot palm", has the largest branched inflorescence in the plant world. it is native to eastern and southern India and Sri Lanka. This plant lives up to 60 years and flowers only once in its lifetime.

===== Unbranched inflorescence =====
Titan arum (Amorphophallus titanum), also known as the "corpse flower", is a flowering plant with the largest unbranched inflorescence in the world. The titan arum's inflorescence is not as large as that of the talipot palm Corypha umbraculifera, but the inflorescence of the talipot palm is branched rather than unbranched. It is endemic to Sumatra, Java and Bali, all in Indonesia. The titan arum is described as a carrion flower, and is also known as the corpse flower or corpse plant (Indonesian: bunga bangkai: bunga means flower, while bangkai can be translated as corpse, cadaver, or carrion). For the same reason, the title "corpse flower" is also sometimes attributed to the genus Rafflesia.

== Fruit ==
=== Heaviest and largest fruit ===
The current world record holder for the heaviest fruit is a pumpkin weighing 1.247 t (196 st 5 lb), which was grown in California in 2023.

=== Smallest and lightest fruit ===
The fruit of species in the genus of Wolffia are the smallest and lightest fruit in the world. Two of the smallest species of Wolffia in the world, the Australian Wolffia angusta, and the Asian/African Wolffia globosa, are so small that it is difficult to distinguish between the size of their fruits. The fruit of W. angusta is 0.30 mm long and weighs about 70 micrograms. Even though it is the smallest fruit in the world, it is one of the largest fruits relative to the size of the parent plant. The common size of the parent plant of the two example species of Wolffia is less than one millimetre in length. This means the small ripe fruit of the genus takes up a third or more of the length of the parent plant.

== See also ==
- List of superlative trees
- List of largest inflorescences
- List of world's largest mushrooms and conks
- List of largest seeds
