= Wolffia angusta =

Conservation status
- Least Concern (IUCN 3.1)

Scientific classification
- Kingdom: Plantae
- Clade: Tracheophytes
- Clade: Angiosperms
- Clade: Monocots
- Order: Alismatales
- Family: Araceae
- Genus: Wolffia
- Species: W. angusta

Binomial name
- Wolffia angusta Landolt, 1980

Species of duckweed

Wolffia angusta is a species of duckweed (Lemnoideae) in the family Araceae, native to the warmer regions of Australia, New Guinea, and with a disjunct presence in Peninsular Malaysia. It has been listed by the Guinness Book of World Records as the smallest flowering plant on record, measuring 0.6 millimetres (0.02 in) long and 0.33 mm (0.01 in) wide. However, more recently Wolffia globosa has been described as the smallest, at 0.1–0.2 mm (0.004–0.008 in) in diameter. According to Guinness World Records the fruit of Wolffia angusta is the smallest of any flowering plant, only 0.25 mm long, and weighs only 70 μg.
