= Wolffiella oblonga =

Scientific classification
- Kingdom: Plantae
- Clade: Tracheophytes
- Clade: Angiosperms
- Clade: Monocots
- Order: Alismatales
- Family: Araceae
- Genus: Wolffiella
- Species: W. oblonga

Binomial name
- Wolffiella oblonga (Phil.) Hegelm.

Synonyms
- Lemna oblonga Phil.; Wolffia lingulata var. minor Hegelm.; Wolffia oblonga (Phil.) Hegelm.

Species of plant

Wolffiella oblonga, the saber bogmat, is a species of flowering plant in the subfamily Lemnoideae, the duckweeds. It is native to tropical and subtropical South America, and to a few locales in North America; Panama, Costa Rica, central Mexico, and the US states of California, Louisiana, and Florida. A tiny elongate hydroannual, it prefers quiet waters with moderate nutrient levels.
