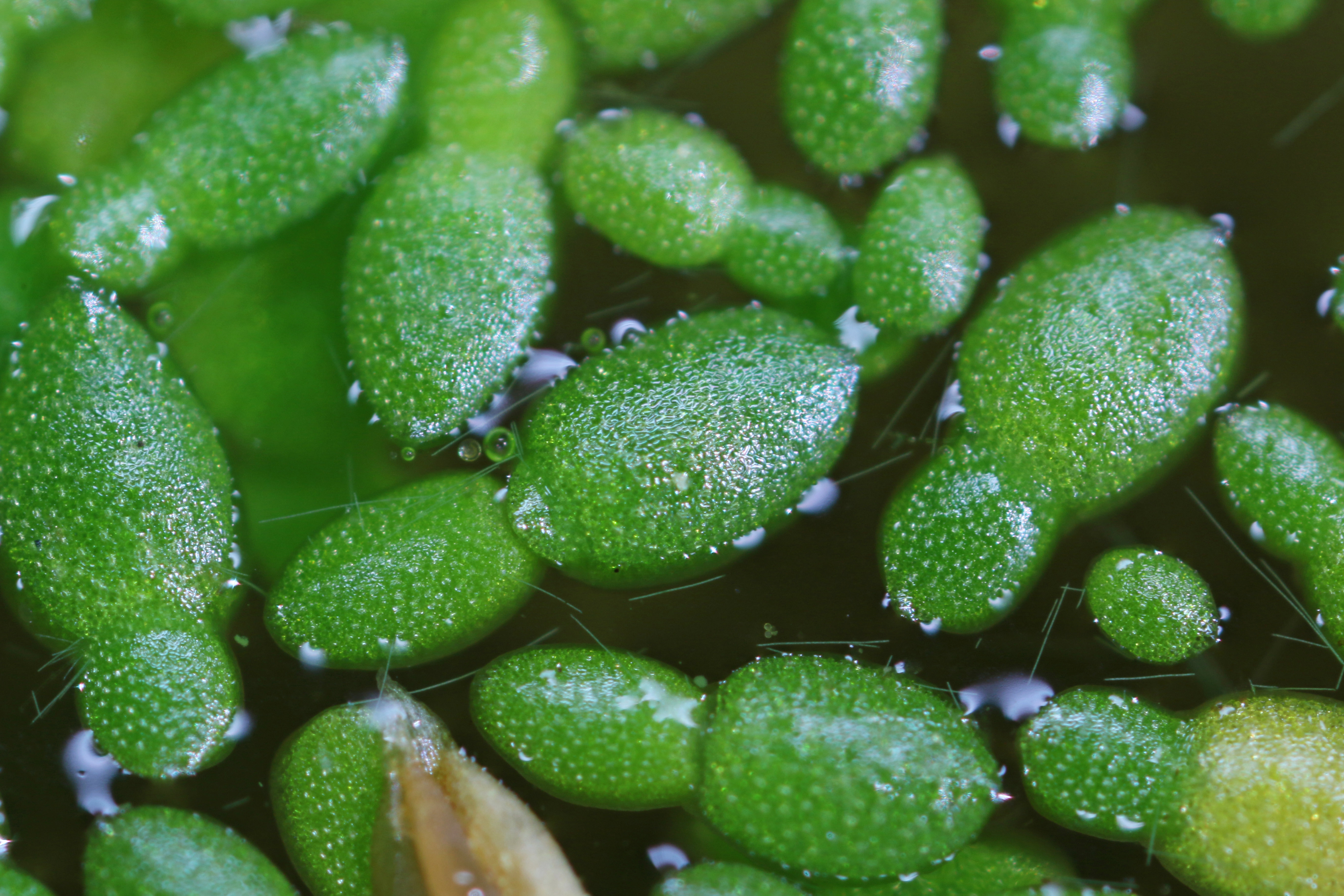

Conservation status
- Least Concern (IUCN 3.1)

Scientific classification
- Kingdom: Plantae
- Clade: Tracheophytes
- Clade: Angiosperms
- Clade: Monocots
- Order: Alismatales
- Family: Araceae
- Genus: Wolffia
- Species: W. borealis

Binomial name
- Wolffia borealis (Engelm. ex Hegelm.) Landolt ex Landolt & Wildi

= Wolffia borealis =

Species of duckweed

Wolffia borealis is a species of flowering plant known by the common name northern watermeal. It is native to North America including sections of Canada and the United States. It grows in mats on the surface of calm water bodies, such as ponds. It is a very tiny plant with no leaves, stems, or roots. The green part is up to 1.2 millimeters long with one rounded end and one pointed end. On the flattened top of the plant is a single stamen and pistil. Like other Wolffia, it is edible and makes a nutritious food.
