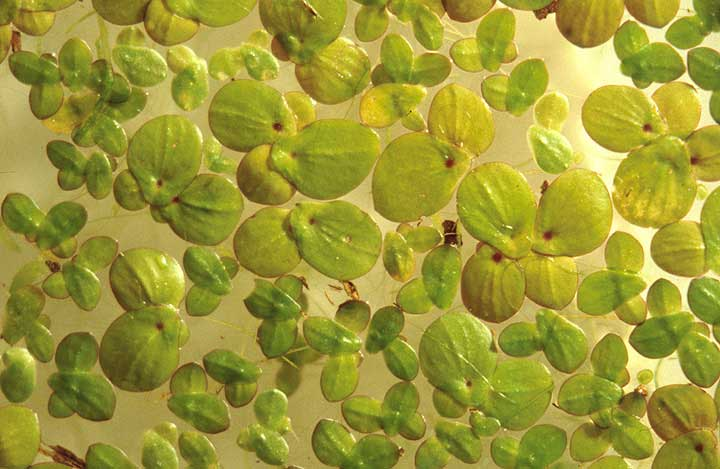
- Spirodela polyrrhiza (larger) compared with Spirodela punctata (smaller)

Scientific classification
- Kingdom: Plantae
- Clade: Tracheophytes
- Clade: Angiosperms
- Clade: Monocots
- Order: Alismatales
- Family: Araceae
- Subfamily: Lemnoideae
- Genus: Spirodela
- Species: S. punctata

Binomial name
- Spirodela punctata (G.Mey.) C.H.Thomps.

= Spirodela punctata =

Species of flowering plant

Spirodela punctata (or Landoltia punctata, common name dotted duckweed) is a species of duckweed (Lemnoideae). The species is morphologically intermediate between Lemna and other species of Spirodela. In 1999 D.H. Les and D.J. Crawford proposed segregating the species to a new genus Landoltia containing just the species L. punctata, on the basis of biochemical and DNA studies.

S. punctata originally was found in Australia and South Asia, but today it can also be found in the Southern and Eastern United States.
