= Wolffia elongata =

Scientific classification
- Kingdom: Plantae
- Clade: Tracheophytes
- Clade: Angiosperms
- Clade: Monocots
- Order: Alismatales
- Family: Araceae
- Genus: Wolffia
- Species: W. elongata

Binomial name
- Wolffia elongata Landolt, 1980

Species of flowering plant

Wolffia elongata is a species of flowering plant within the family Araceae. It is native to Colombia, where it grows in the wet tropical biome.
