= Wolffiella lingulata =

Scientific classification
- Kingdom: Plantae
- Clade: Embryophytes
- Clade: Tracheophytes
- Clade: Spermatophytes
- Clade: Angiosperms
- Clade: Monocots
- Order: Alismatales
- Family: Araceae
- Genus: Wolffiella
- Species: W. lingulata

Binomial name
- Wolffiella lingulata Hegelm.

Species of aquatic plant

Wolffiella lingulata is a species of flowering plant known by the common names tongueshape bogmat and tongueshape mud-midget. It is native to the Americas, where it is widely distributed and grows in calm water bodies such as ponds. It is a tiny plant made up a green frond measuring 3 to 9 millimeters wide. It often takes the form of a mother-daughter pair of fronds as it undergoes vegetative reproduction by budding. It may also undergo sexual reproduction by producing minute, microscopic flowers.
