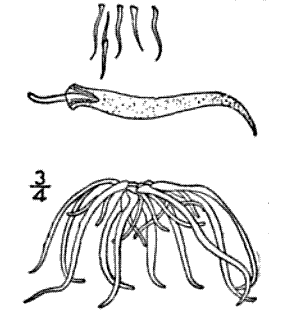
- Drawings of Wolffiella gladiata

Scientific classification
- Kingdom: Plantae
- Clade: Tracheophytes
- Clade: Angiosperms
- Clade: Monocots
- Order: Alismatales
- Family: Araceae
- Subfamily: Lemnoideae
- Genus: Wolffiella; Hegelm.

Species
- 10, see text

= Wolffiella =

Genus of duckweeds

Wolffiella is a genus of aquatic plants commonly called duckweeds in the family Araceae. Common names for plants in this genus include bogmat and mud-midget. They are rootless and have a keel that allows them to maintain their orientation in the water. They are small, measuring 2 mm (0.08 in) to 10 mm (0.4 in) in width.

== Selected species ==
- Wolffiella caudata
- Wolffiella denticulata
- Wolffiella gladiata
- Wolffiella hyalina
- Wolffiella lingulata
- Wolffiella neotropica
- Wolffiella oblonga
- Wolffiella repanda
- Wolffiella rotunda
- Wolffiella welwitschii
