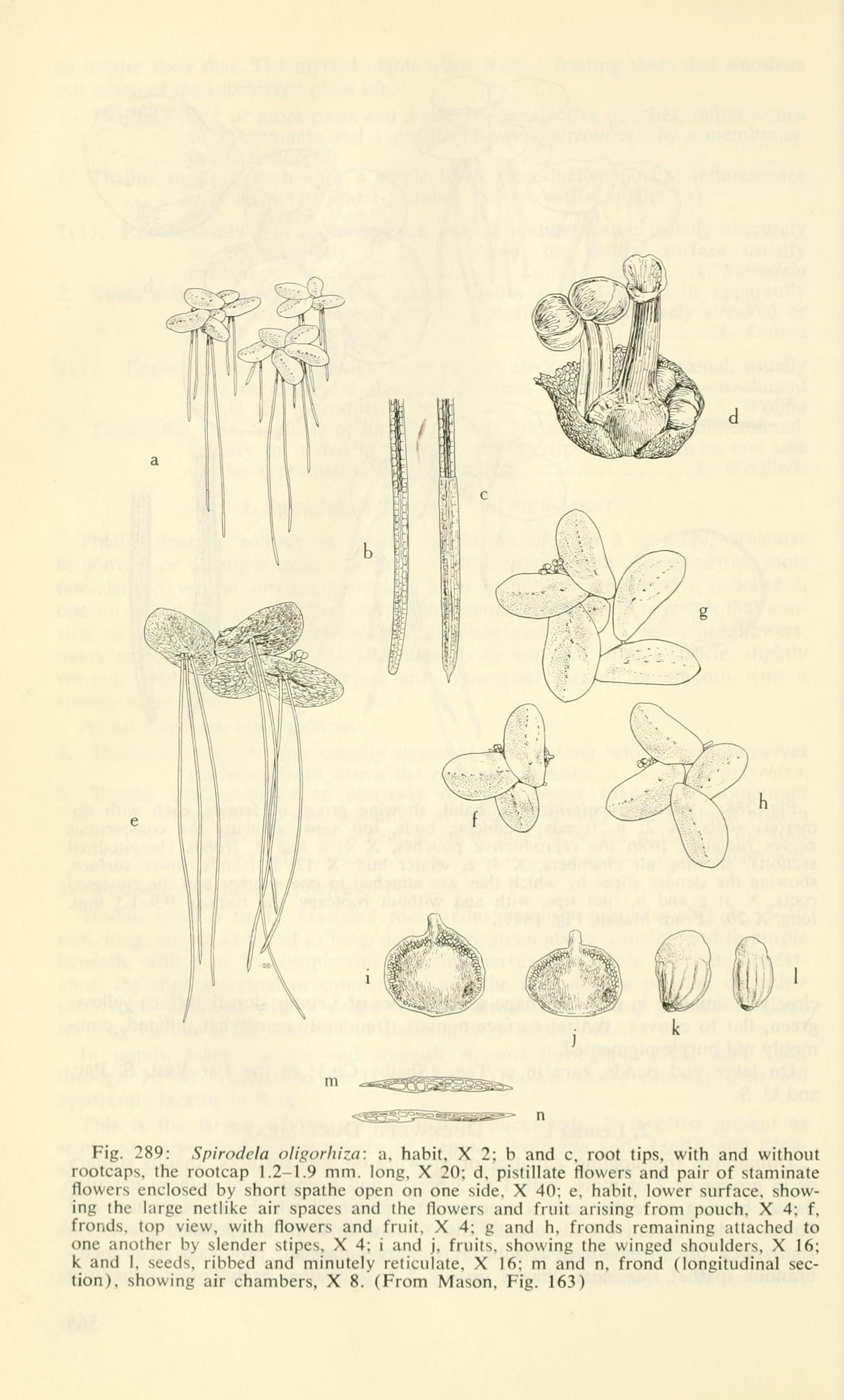
- Illustration of Spirodela oligorrhiza

Scientific classification
- Kingdom: Plantae
- Clade: Tracheophytes
- Clade: Angiosperms
- Clade: Monocots
- Order: Alismatales
- Family: Araceae
- Genus: Spirodela
- Species: S. oligorrhiza

Binomial name
- Spirodela oligorrhiza (Kurz) Hegelm.

Synonyms
- Lemna oligorrhiza Kurz; Lemna javanica F.A.Bauer ex Hegelm.; Lemna melanorrhiza F.Muell. ex Kurz; Lemna pleiorrhiza F.Muell. ex Kurz; Lemna pusilla Hegelm.; Spirodela javanica (Hegelm.) Hegelm.; Spirodela melanorrhiza (F.Muell. ex Kurz) Hegelm.; Spirodela oligorrhiza var. javanica Hegelm.; Spirodela oligorrhiza var. melanorrhiza (F.Muell. ex Kurz) Hegelm.; Spirodela oligorrhiza var. pleiorrhiza (F.Muell. ex Kurz) Hegelm.; Spirodela oligorrhiza var. pusilla Hegelm.; Spirodela pleiorrhiza (F.Muell. ex Kurz) Hegelm.; Spirodela pusilla (Hegelm.) Hegelm.

= Spirodela oligorrhiza =

Species of plant

Spirodela oligorrhiza is a species of plants in the family Araceae.

== Sources ==
This article incorporates text from a free content work. Licensed under CC0 (license statement/permission). Text taken from Spirodela oligorrhiza. Encyclopedia of Life.
