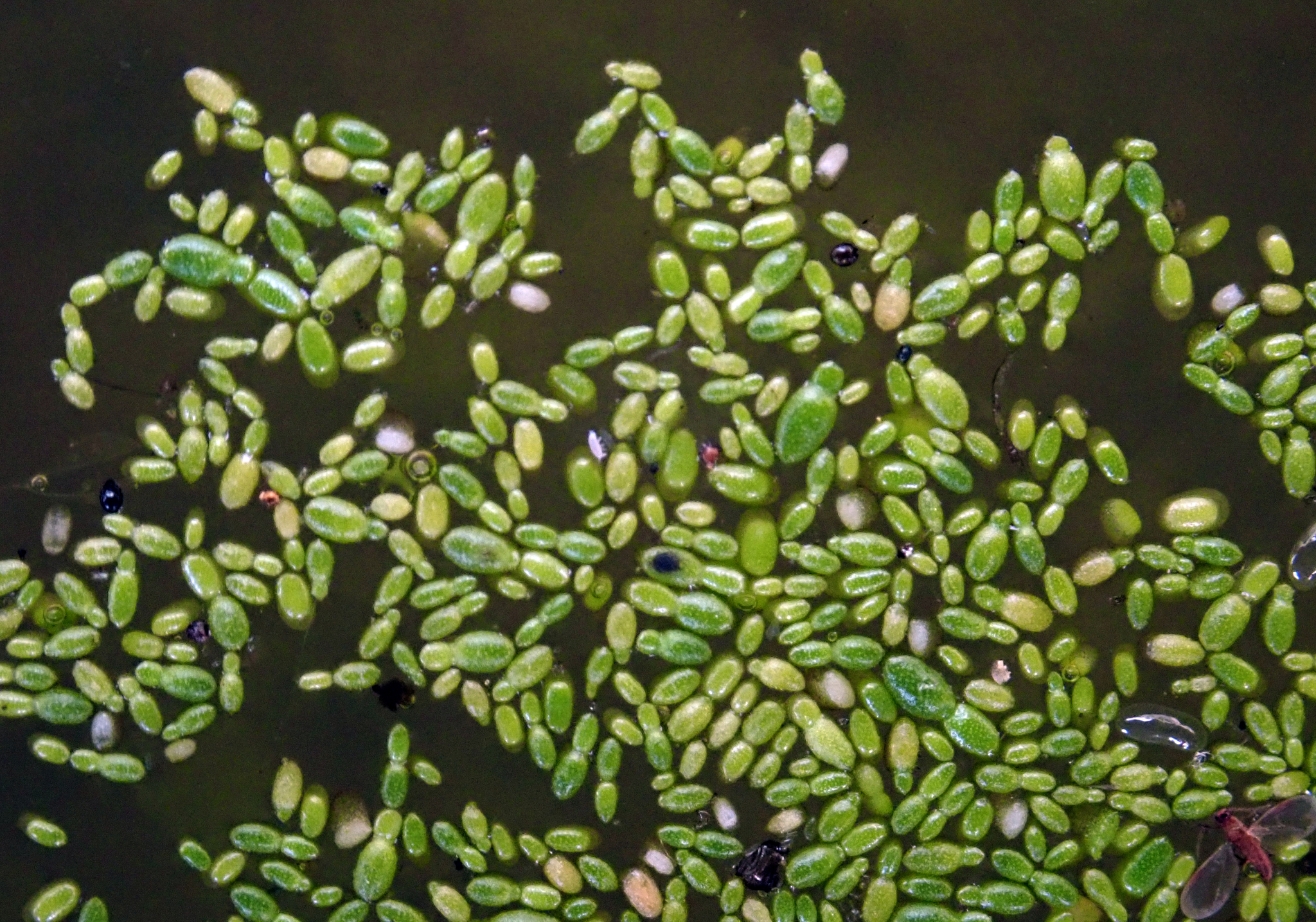

Scientific classification
- Kingdom: Plantae
- Clade: Tracheophytes
- Clade: Angiosperms
- Clade: Monocots
- Order: Alismatales
- Family: Araceae
- Genus: Wolffia
- Species: W. australiana

Binomial name
- Wolffia australiana (Benth.) Hartog & Plas, 1972

= Wolffia australiana =

Species of duckweed

Wolffia australiana is a species of flowering plant in the subfamily Lemnaceae within the family Araceae.

Wolffia australiana is the smallest flowering plant and it has the fastest growing population due to cloning itself, which mostly uses asexual reproduction and rarely produces flowers except under stress or seasonal conditions. Wolffia australiana has an average lifespan of about 17 days, which produces 11 new fronds. It can change its cellular structure as a survival mechanism during different seasons.
