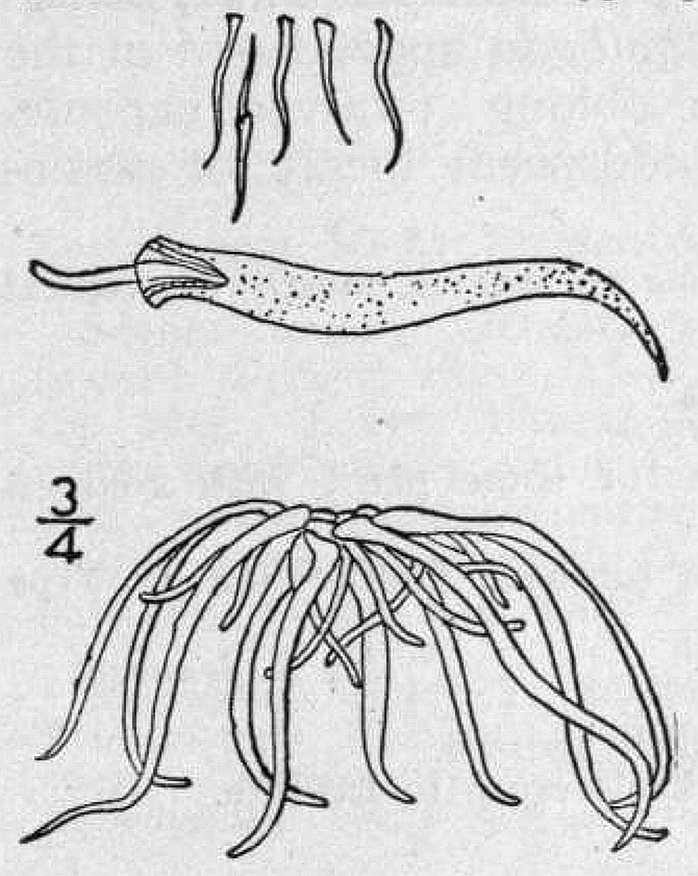

Scientific classification
- Kingdom: Plantae
- Clade: Tracheophytes
- Clade: Angiosperms
- Clade: Monocots
- Order: Alismatales
- Family: Araceae
- Genus: Wolffiella
- Species: W. gladiata

Binomial name
- Wolffiella gladiata (Hegelm.) Hegelm.

Synonyms
- Wolffia floridana (J.D.Sm.) O.D.Sm. ex Hegelm.; Wolffia gladiata Hegelm.; Wolffia gladiata var. floridana J.D.Sm.; Wolffiella floridana (J.D.Sm.) C.H.Thomps.

= Wolffiella gladiata =

Species of aquatic plant

Wolffiella gladiata, the Florida mudmidget, is an aquatic plant in the family Araceae. It is one of the smallest flowering plants known, a mere 3–9 mm long. It occurs in quiet waters in the states along the Atlantic and Gulf Coasts of the United States from Texas to New Jersey plus in the states of the Ohio River Valley. Additional specimens have been collected from Massachusetts, Washington, and the Distrito Federal de México.
