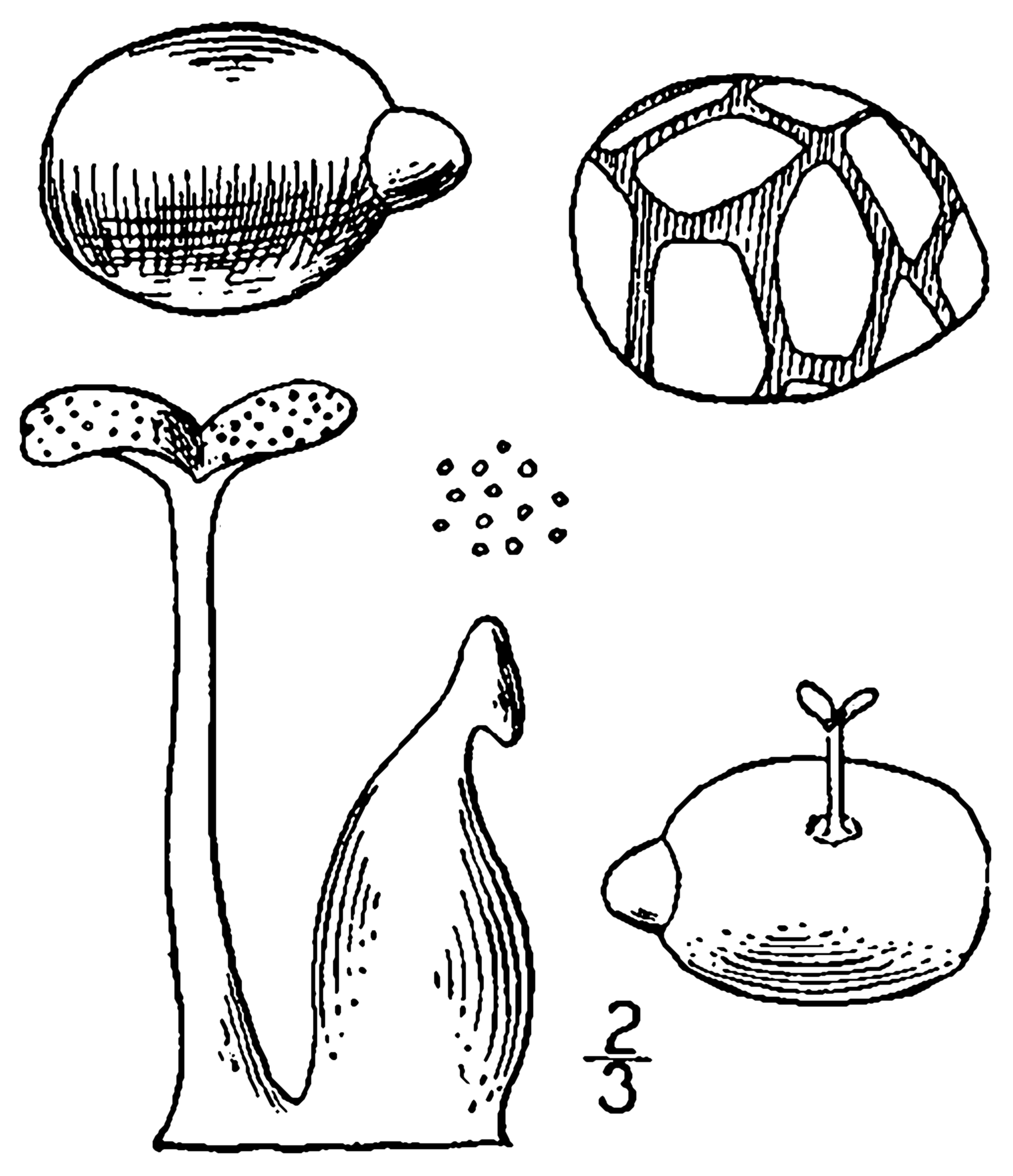
- 1913 illustration

Conservation status
- Least Concern (IUCN 3.1)

Scientific classification
- Kingdom: Plantae
- Clade: Tracheophytes
- Clade: Angiosperms
- Clade: Monocots
- Order: Alismatales
- Family: Araceae
- Genus: Wolffia
- Species: W. columbiana

Binomial name
- Wolffia columbiana H.Karst. (1865)

Synonyms
- Grantia columbiana (H.Karst.) MacMill.

= Wolffia columbiana =

Species of aquatic plant

Wolffia columbiana, the Columbian watermeal, is a perennial aquatic plant in the subfamily Lemnoideae. This plant is distributed widely throughout North, Central, and South America, and also occurs in Curaçao.

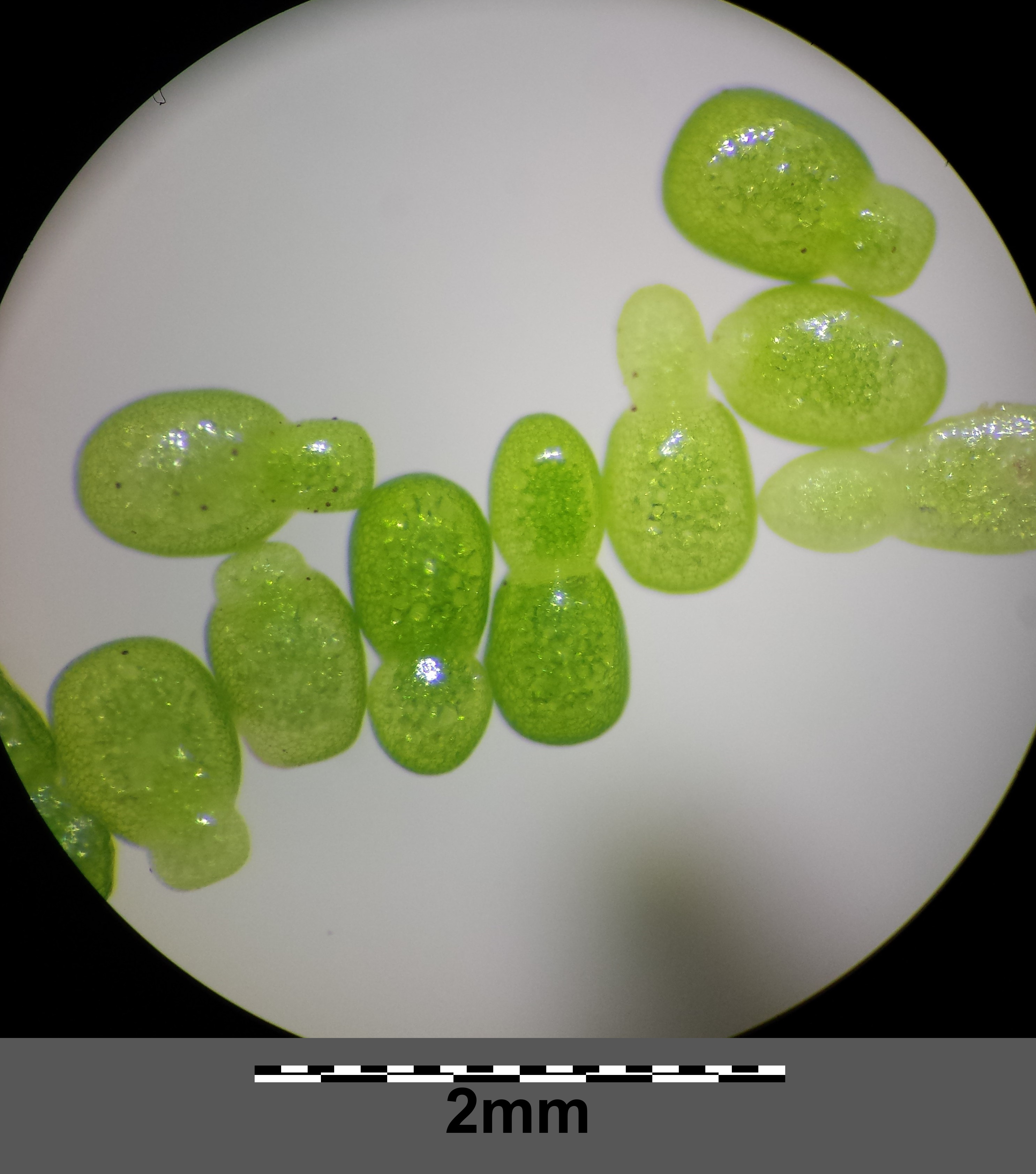
Wolffia columbiana from a pond in Laimergrube in Stammersdorf, Vienna-Floridsdorf
