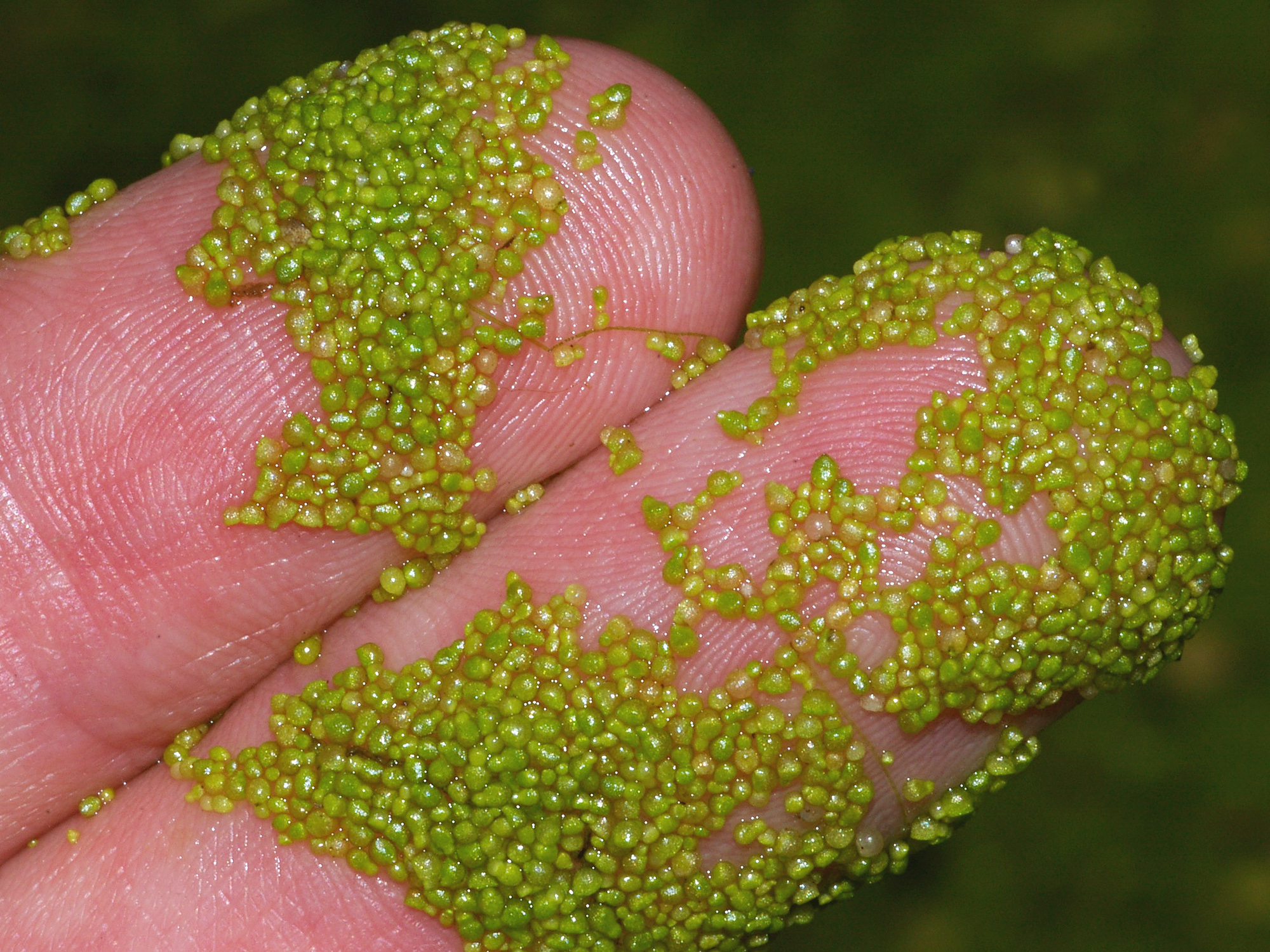
- Each speck is an individual plant

Scientific classification
- Kingdom: Plantae
- Clade: Tracheophytes
- Clade: Angiosperms
- Clade: Monocots
- Order: Alismatales
- Family: Araceae
- Subfamily: Lemnoideae
- Genus: Wolffia; Schleid.

= Wolffia =

Genus of aquatic plants

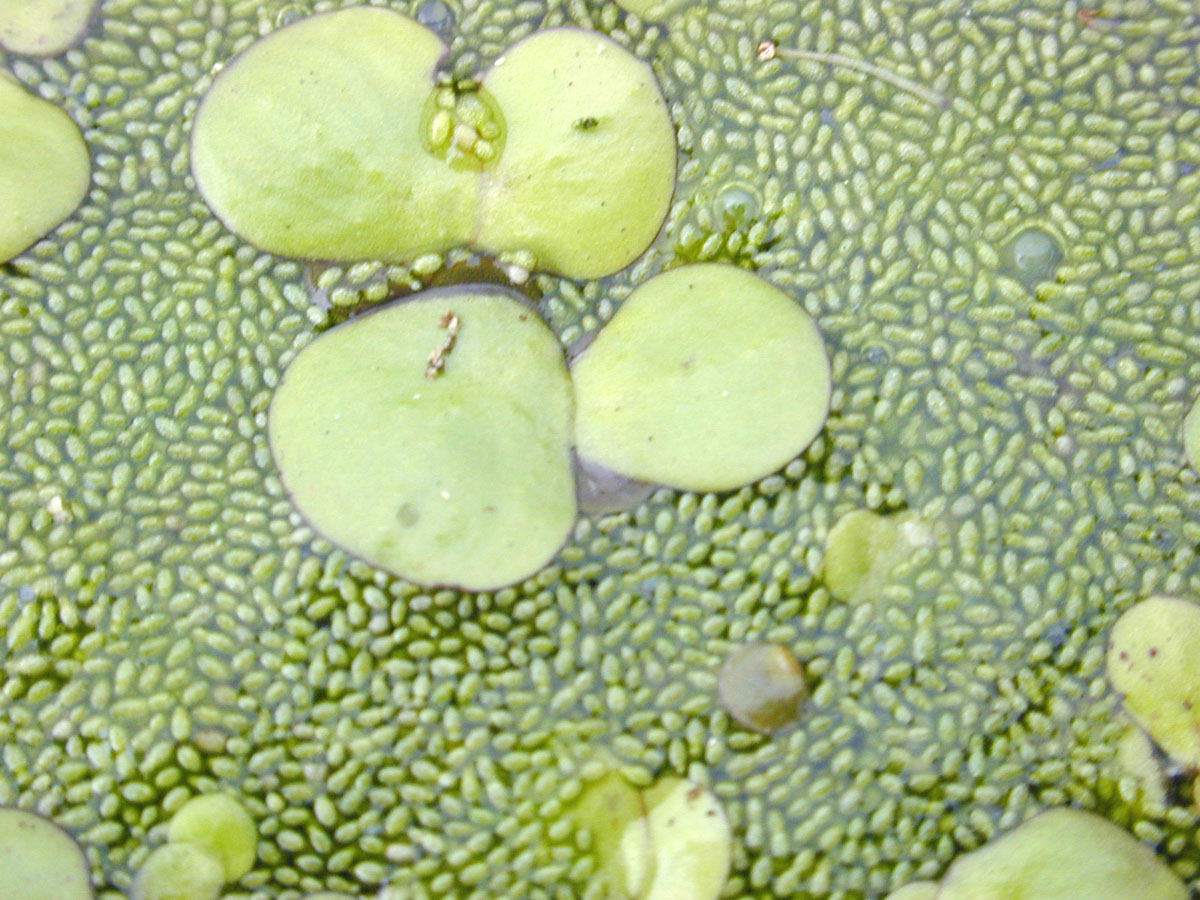
Close-up of floating aquatic plants: Spirodela polyrrhiza and Wolffia globosa; the very tiny Wolffia plants are under 2 millimetres (0.079 in) long.

Wolffia is a genus of aquatic plants with a cosmopolitan distribution. They include the smallest flowering plants on Earth. Commonly called watermeal or rootless duckweed, these aquatic plants resemble specks of cornmeal floating on the water. They often float together in pairs or form floating mats with related plants, such as Lemna and Spirodela species.

== Description ==
Wolffia are free-floating aquatic plants with fronds that are nearly spherical to cylindrical in shape and lack airspaces or veins. They do not have roots. Their rarely seen flowers originate from a cavity on the upper surface of the frond, and each flower has one stamen and one pistil.

Although Wolffia can reproduce by seed, they usually use vegetative reproduction. A mother frond has a terminal conical cavity from which it produces daughter fronds.

== Physiology ==
The growth rate of Wolffia varies within and among species. The rates of photosynthesis and respiration also vary proportionately to growth rate. The fastest growth rate (in fact, the fastest growth rate of any flowering plant) is shown by a clone of Wolffia microscopica, with a doubling time of 29.3 hours.

== As food ==
Wolffia are a potential high-protein livestock food source. One species, W. microscopica, is over 20% protein by dry weight and has high content of essential amino acids. They have historically been collected from the water and eaten as a vegetable in Asia.

== Species ==
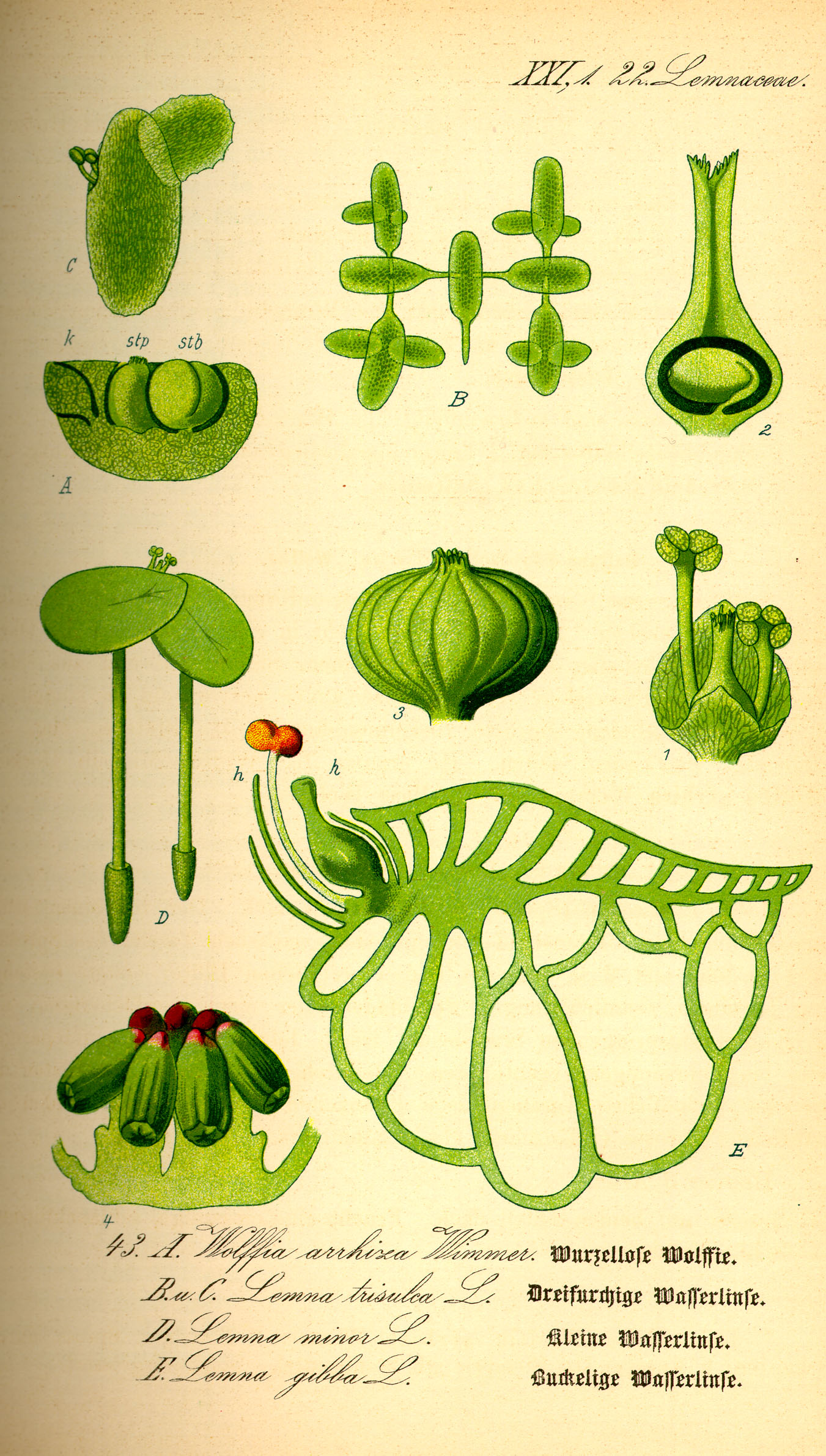
An 1885 illustration of Wolffia arrhiza

As of 2020, eleven species are accepted on Kew's Plants of the World Online:

- Wolffia angusta Landolt
- Wolffia arrhiza (L.) Horkel ex Wimm.
- Wolffia australiana (Benth.) Hartog & Plas
- Wolffia borealis (Engelm.) Landolt
- Wolffia brasiliensis Wedd.
- Wolffia columbiana H.Karst.
- Wolffia cylindracea Hegelm.
- Wolffia elongata Landolt
- Wolffia globosa (Roxb.) Hartog & Plas
- Wolffia microscopica (Griff.) Kurz
- Wolffia neglecta Landolt
