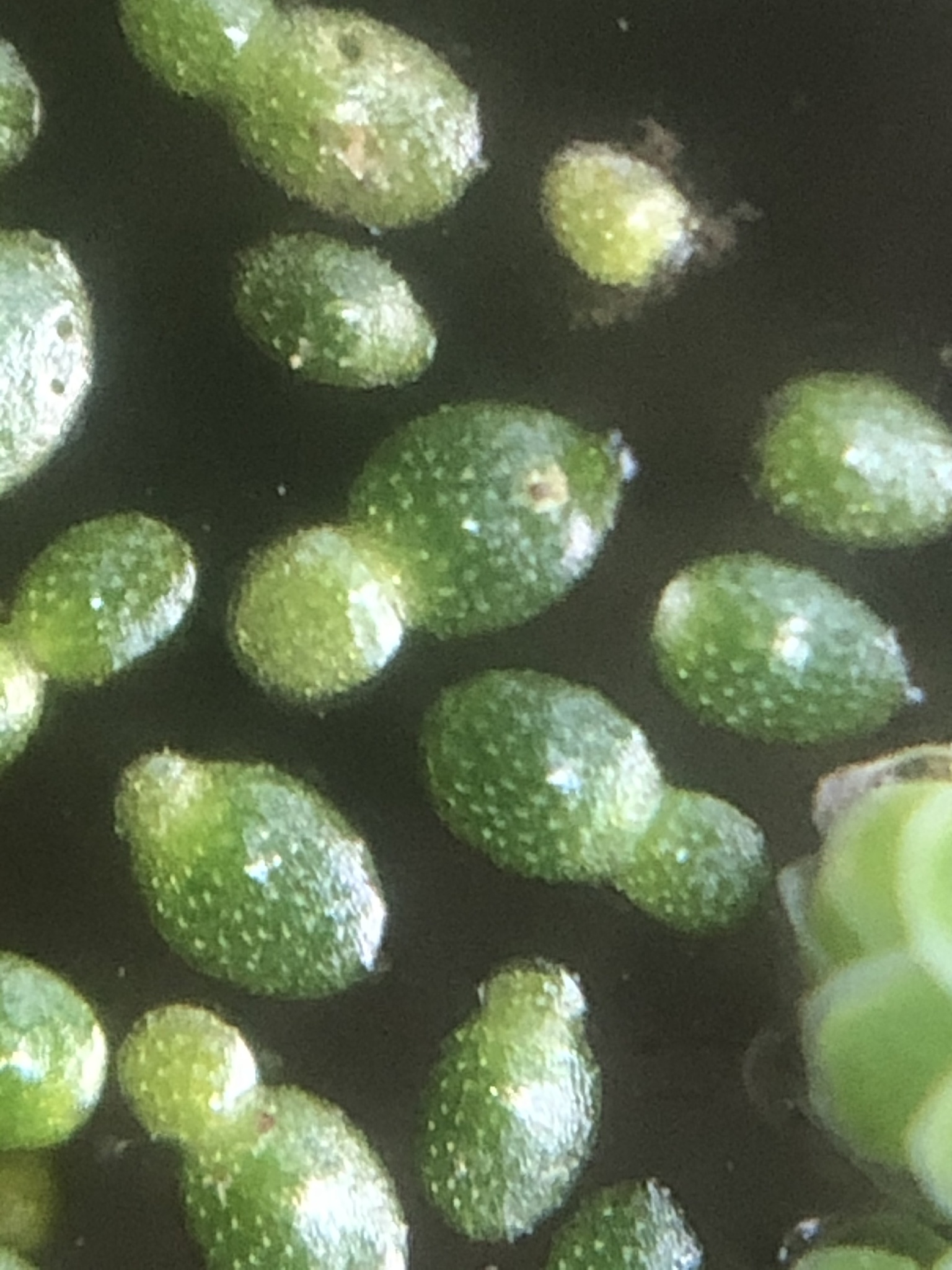

Scientific classification
- Kingdom: Plantae
- Clade: Tracheophytes
- Clade: Angiosperms
- Clade: Monocots
- Order: Alismatales
- Family: Araceae
- Genus: Wolffia
- Species: W. brasiliensis

Binomial name
- Wolffia brasiliensis Weddell

= Wolffia brasiliensis =

Brazilian watermeal

Species of plant

Wolffia brasiliensis is a species of flowering plant known by the common name Brazilian watermeal. It is native to North and South America, where it grows in mats on the surface of calm water bodies, such as ponds. It is a very small plant with no leaves, stems, or roots. The green part is up to 1.2 millimeters long with a flat surface with a bump in the center.

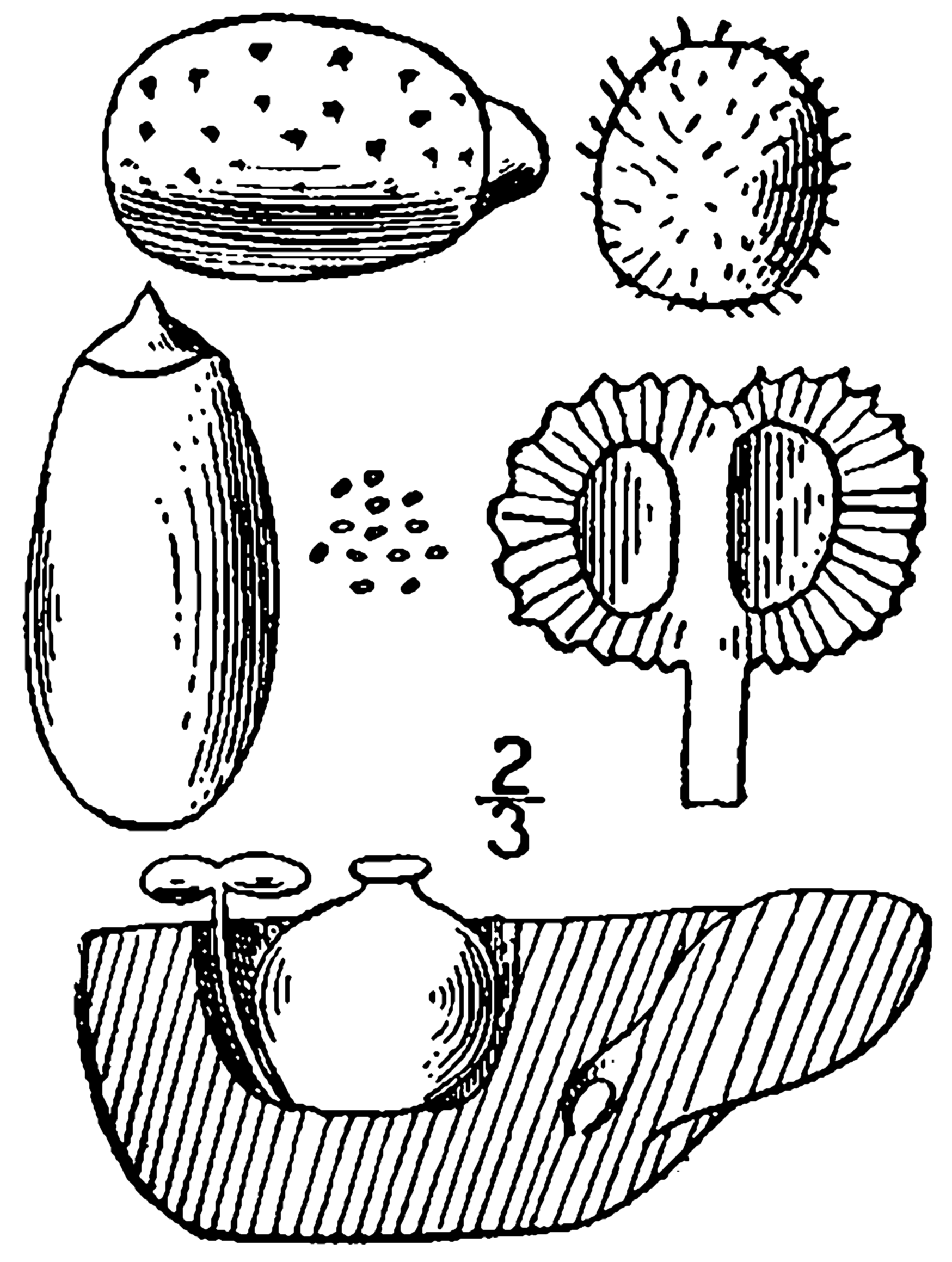
1913 botanical illustration
