= Indicator value =

Term used in ecology

Indicator value is a term that is used in the ecology of plants for two different indices. The older usage of the term refers to Ellenberg's indicator values from 1974, which are based on a simple ordinal classification of plants according to the position of their realized ecological niche along an environmental gradient. Since 1997, the term has also been used to refer to Dufrêne & Legendre's indicator value, which is a quantitative index measuring the statistical alliance of a species to any one of the classes in a classification of sites.

== According to Ellenberg ==
Ellenberg's indicator values were the first model of bioindication proposed and applied to the flora of Central Europe, and they have a long tradition in interpretation and understanding of plant communities and their evolution. The latest edition of Ellenberg's indicator values applies a 9-point scale for each of seven gradients:

- R - reaction (soil or water acidity/pH)
- N - nitrogen (but really soil fertility or productivity, and not mineral nitrogen)
- F - soil humidity or moisture
- S - salt (soil salinity)
- K - climatic continentality
- L - light availability
- T - temperature

Indicator values have also been published in 1977 by Elias Landolt for Switzerland, by Mark O. Hill and others for Great Britain, France (Baseflor, SOPHY, Ecoplant) and some other floras.

== According to Dufrêne and Legendre ==
The indicator value of Dufrêne and Legendre from 1997 is an integral part of the indicator value, which quantifies the fidelity and specificity of species in relation to groups of sites in a user-specified classification of sites, and tests for the statistical significance of the associations by permutation.

The indicator value of species i for class j is obtained with the equation

IndVal_{ij} = 100 · A_{ij} · B_{ij}

Here

A_{ij} is specificity, i.e. the proportion of the individuals of species i that are in class j
B_{ij} is fidelity, i.e. the proportion of sites in class j that contain species i
