= Elias Landolt =

Swiss botanist (1926–2013)

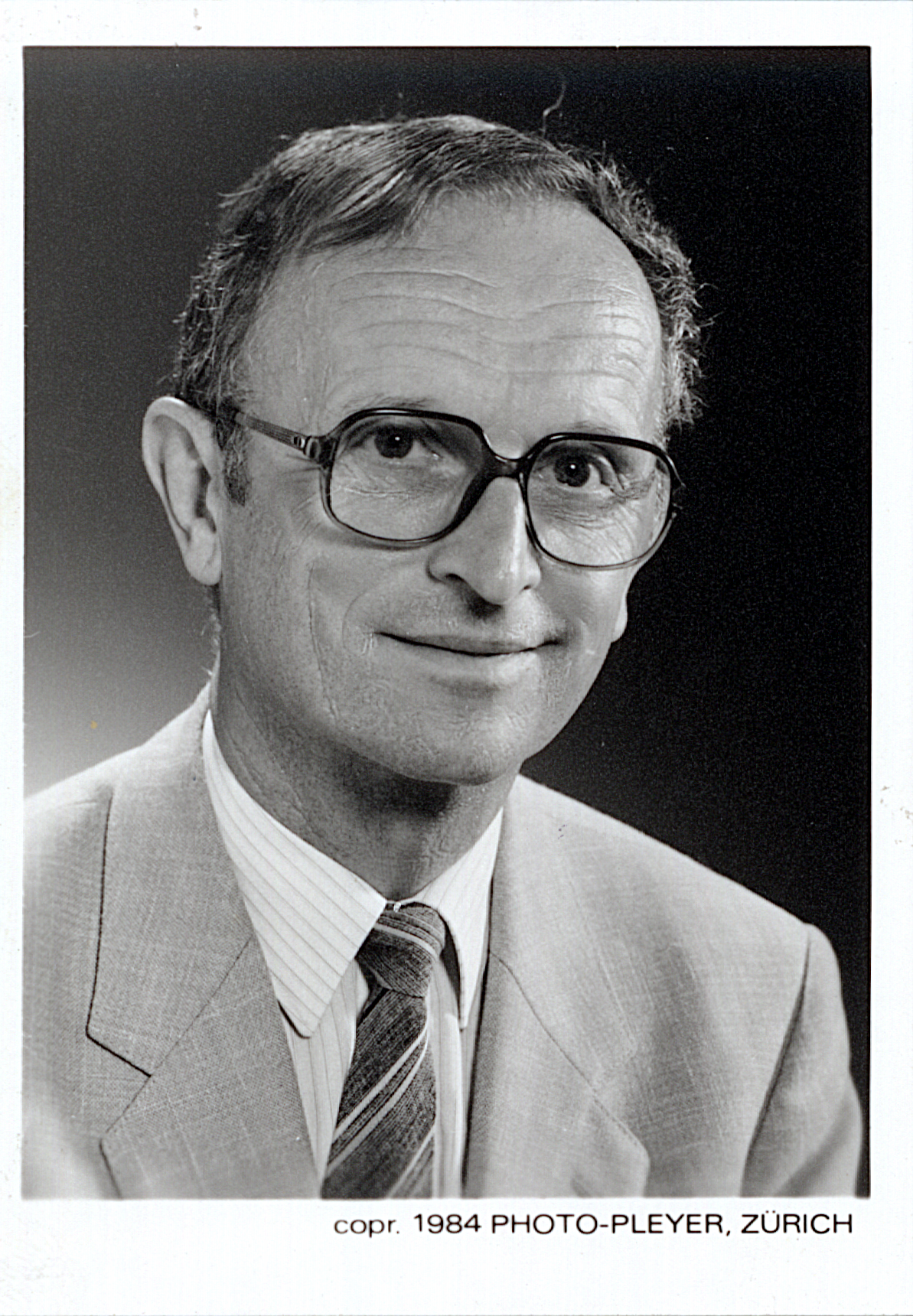
- Elias Landolt, 1984
- Born: 24 July 1926; Zürich, Switzerland
- Died: 11 April 2013 (aged 86); Zürich, Switzerland
- Scientific career
- Fields: Botany
- Author abbrev. (botany): Landolt

Elias Landolt (1926–2013) was a Swiss geobotanist, known for his publications on Switzerland's native flora and Lemnoideae (popularly called duckweeds or water lenses).

== Life and career ==
Landolt grew up in the Zürich district Enge. He was the eldest son of the lawyer, politician and later Zürich's mayor Emil Landolt and the great-grandson of his namesake Elias Landolt, a forest scientist. At ETH Zurich (ETHZ), Elias Landolt (the younger) studied natural science from 1945 to 1949 and received his doctorate there in 1953 under the professors Ernst Gäumann and Walo Koch with a dissertation on Ranunculus montanus (mountain buttercup). From 1953 to 1955, he was a postdoc in California, first at the Carnegie Institution for Science, Department of Plant Biology, Stanford, and then at Caltech in Pasadena.

Returning to Zürich in 1955, Landolt joined the academic staff of ETHZ, where he worked until his retirement. In 1957 he completed his habilitation thesis Physiologische und ökologische Untersuchungen an Lemnaceen (Physiological and ecological studies on duckweeds). From 1957 to 1964 he worked as a Privatdozent in systematic botany, especially systematics of flowering plants.

In 1964, Landolt was appointed associate professor of systematic botany, in particular Phanerogamae systematics. He worked from 1966 to 1967 as a professor extraordinarius and from 1967 to 1992 as a professor ordinarius of geobotany; he gave his farewell lecture in February 1993. He also served as director of the Geobotanical Institute from 1966 to 1993, Rübel Foundation (now part of the Institute of Integrative Biology in the Department of Environmental Sciences of ETHZ). Even after his retirement in 1992, Landolt remained active in research.

== Research and conservation ==
Landolt became known in Switzerland mainly for his research and publications on the Swiss and Alpine flora, and later also for his extensive mapping for the city of Zürich and the Sihlwald to the south. His geobotanical mapping helped botanists at Zürich's horticultural offices achieve a better understanding of local flora.

Landolt's 1977 publication of ecological Indicator values and biological attributes of the flora of Switzerland and the Alps made him internationally known. In 2010 it was published in the second edition.

He also made many exploratory trips to tropical and subtropical countries to collect Lemnoideae, resulting in a unique collection of living duckweed and herbarium specimens from which many researchers have obtained the objects for their work. The original collection is still in Zürich. A copy of the collection is maintained in the United States at Rutgers University; a small part of the collection is also available at the Friedrich Schiller University Jena.

In addition to his research activities, Landolt was involved in numerous botany and nature conservation associations and commissions, such as Pro Natura (formerly the Swiss League for the Protection of Nature), the Zürich and Swiss Botanical Societies, the Naturforschende Gesellschaft in Zürich, the Swiss Greina Foundation for the Conservation of Alpine Rivers, the Sihlwald Nature Conservation Foundation, and the Sitatunga Foundation for Nature Conservation.

== Honors ==
In honor of Elias Landolt, a genus of duckweed was named Landoltia by Donald H. Les & Daniel J. Crawford.

A small-leaved linden (Tilia cordata), which now grows in the Zürich city park known as the J.-R.-von-Salis-Anlage (located in the Zürich Hirschengraben), was planted by Pro Natura in memory of its longtime honorary president.

== Selected publications ==
In addition to publications intended for the narrower scientific community, Landolt knew how to write those that appealed to an interested lay public.

Flora of Switzerland and the Alps

- Die Artengruppen des Ranunculus montanus Willd. in den Alpen und im Jura. Zytologisch-systematische Untersuchungen. Dissertation ETH, Bern 1954. published in: Bericht der Schweizerischen Botanischen Gesellschaft, vol. 64, pp. 9–84.
- Unsere Alpenflora. 1st edition, SAC-Verlag, Bern 1960; 8th edition 2012.
- with H. Hess and R. Hirzel: Flora der Schweiz. Birkhäuser Verlag, Basel/Boston/Berlin 1967. (3 vols.)
- Flora der Stadt Zürich. Birkhäuser Verlag, Basel/Boston/Berlin 2001.
- Flora indicativa. Ökologische Zeigerwerte und biologische Kennzeichen zur Flora der Schweiz und der Alpen. Haupt Verlag, Bern 1977, 2010.
- Flora des Sihltals von der Stadt Zürich bis zum Höhronen (PDF; 6,7 MB) und Karten zur Flora des Sihltals (PDF; 3,7 MB), published by Fachstelle Naturschutz Kanton Zürich. 2013.

Duckweeds

- Physiologische und ökologische Untersuchungen an Lemnaceen. Habilitationsschrift ETH, 1957. published in: Berichte der Schweizerischen Botanischen Gesellschaft, vol. 67, pp. 271–410.
- The Family of Lemnaceae – a monographic study. vol. 1. Zürich 1986 (= Veröffentlichungen des Geobotanischen Instituts der ETH, Stiftung Rübel in Zürich, Heft 71).
- with R. Kandeler: The Family of Lemnaceae – a monographic study. vol. 2. Zürich 1987 (= Veröffentlichungen des Geobotanischen Instituts der ETH, Stiftung Rübel in Zürich, Heft 95).

Further reading

- Die Entwicklung der Botanik an der ETH in Zürich. In: Botanica Helvetica, 100/3, 1990, pp. 353–374. e-lib.ch
- Vom Sinn und Unsinn botanischer Nomenklatur. In: Botanica Helvetica, 101/1, 1991, pp. 1–7. e-lib.ch
- Elias Landolt 1821–1896. Ein Leben für den Wald. Beer, Zürich 2002 (= Neujahrsblatt auf das Jahr 2002, hrsg. von der Gelehrten Gesellschaft in Zürich).
