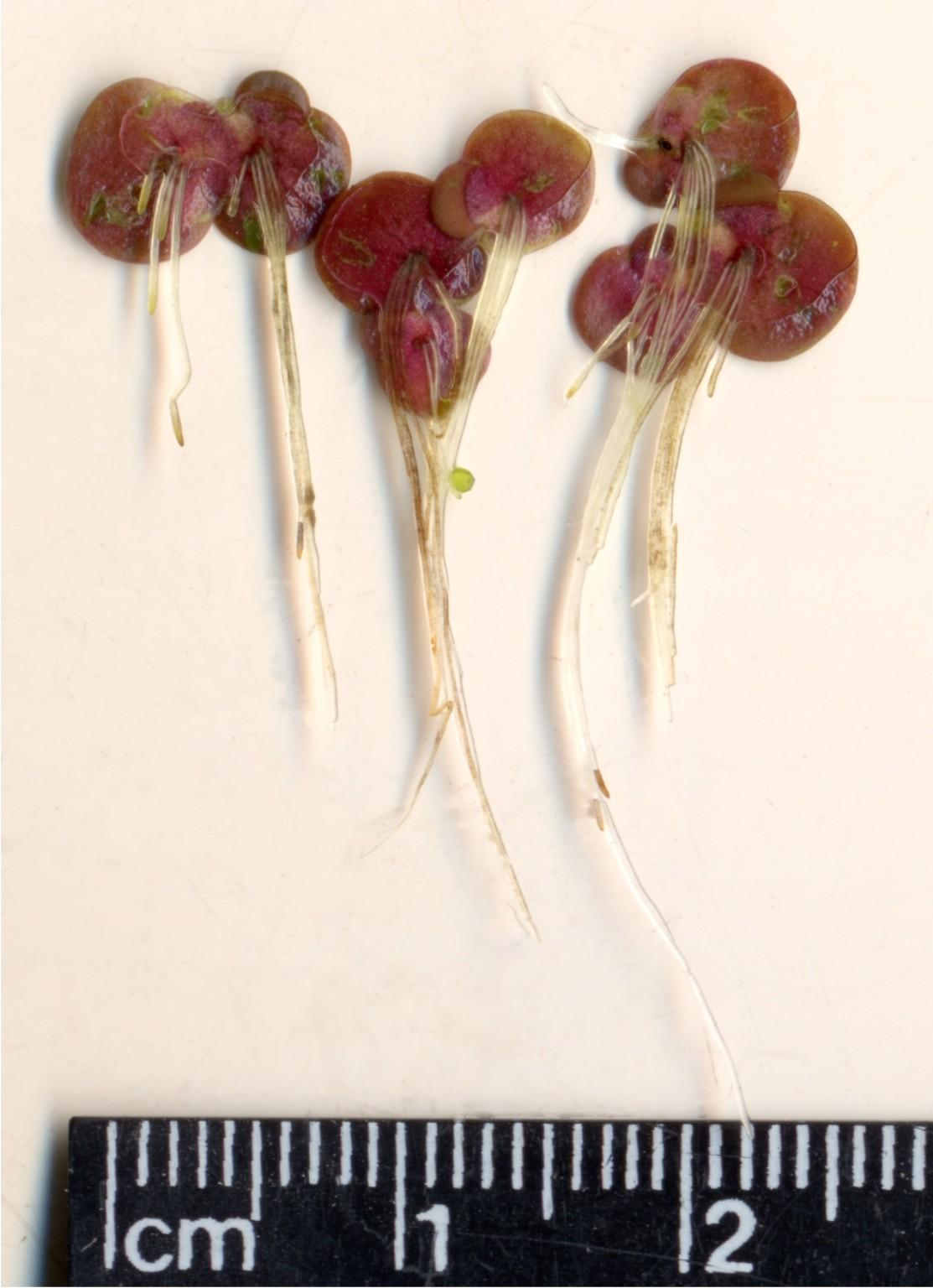
- Spirodela polyrrhiza

Scientific classification
- Kingdom: Plantae
- Clade: Tracheophytes
- Clade: Angiosperms
- Clade: Monocots
- Order: Alismatales
- Family: Araceae
- Subfamily: Lemnoideae
- Genus: Spirodela; Schleid.

Synonyms
- Landoltia Les & D.J.Crawford

= Spirodela =

Genus of aquatic plants

Spirodela is a genus of aquatic plants, one of several genera containing plants commonly called duckweed. Spirodela species are members of the Araceae family under the APG II system. They were formerly members of the subfamily Lemnaceae.

== Description ==
Spirodela species are free-floating plants with stems transformed into leaf-like structures called fronds; each plant is represented by a frond with roots; therefore, they do not have leaves. Two to five plants may remain connected to each other.

The plants are green but may turn red due to the presence of anthocyanin. Multiple roots (5 to 20, depending on the species) emerge from each frond. Spirodela is larger (10 mm) than the Lemna genus (2 mm – 5 mm), which also has only one root per frond.

Certain species of Spirodela overwinter as turions, dormant, starchy shoots that lack air pockets, which sink to the bottom of the water. In spring, turions rise to the surface and germinate.

Spirodela often forms floating mats with related species (e.g. Lemna and Wolffia).

The genus is cosmopolitan in distribution.

== Species ==
As of December 2025, Plants of the World Online accepts the following four species:

- Spirodela oligorrhiza (Kurz) Hegelm.
- Spirodela polyrhiza (L.) Schleid.
- Spirodela punctata (G.Mey.) C.H.Thomps.
- Spirodela sichuanensis M.G.Liu & K.M.Xie
