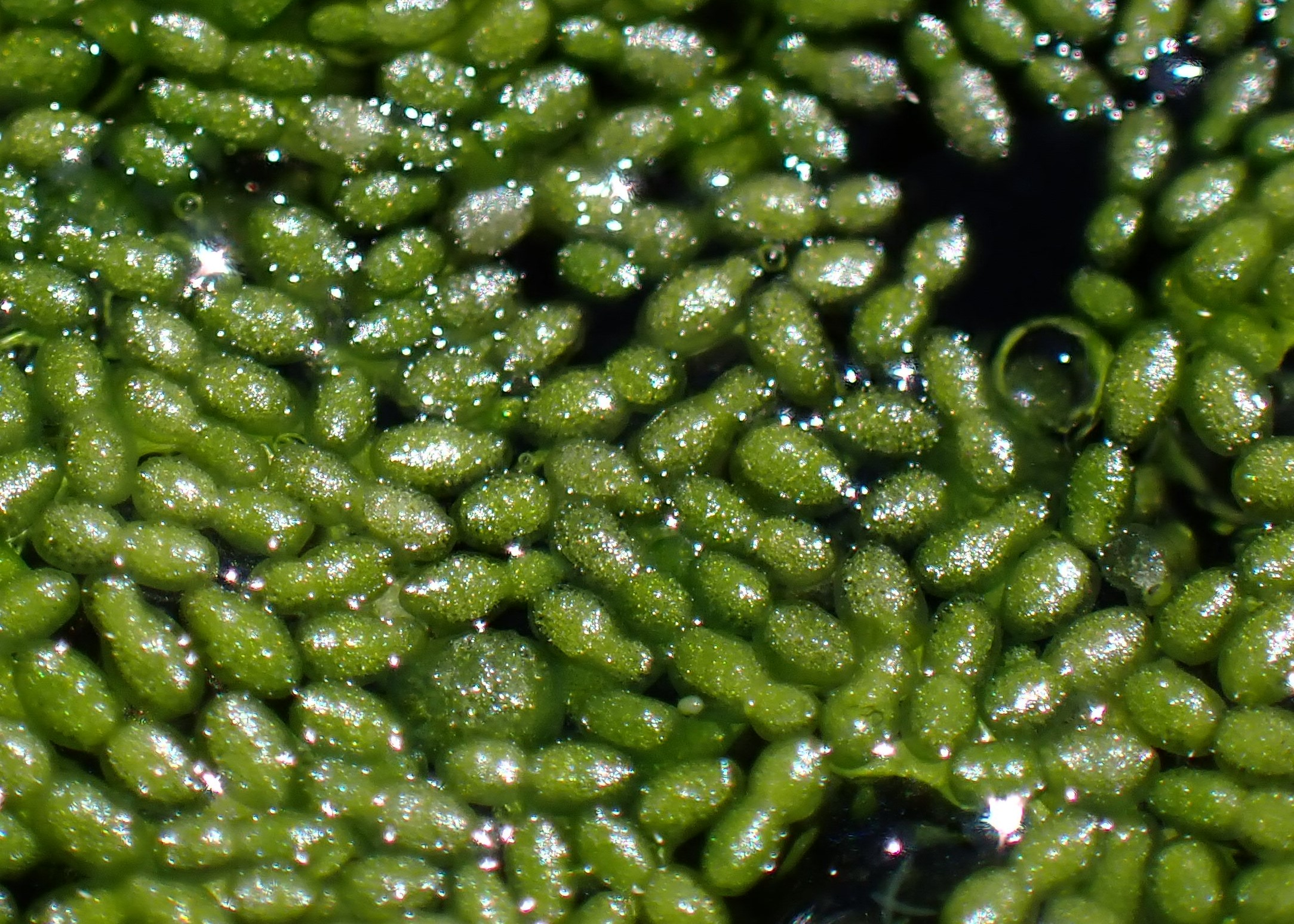

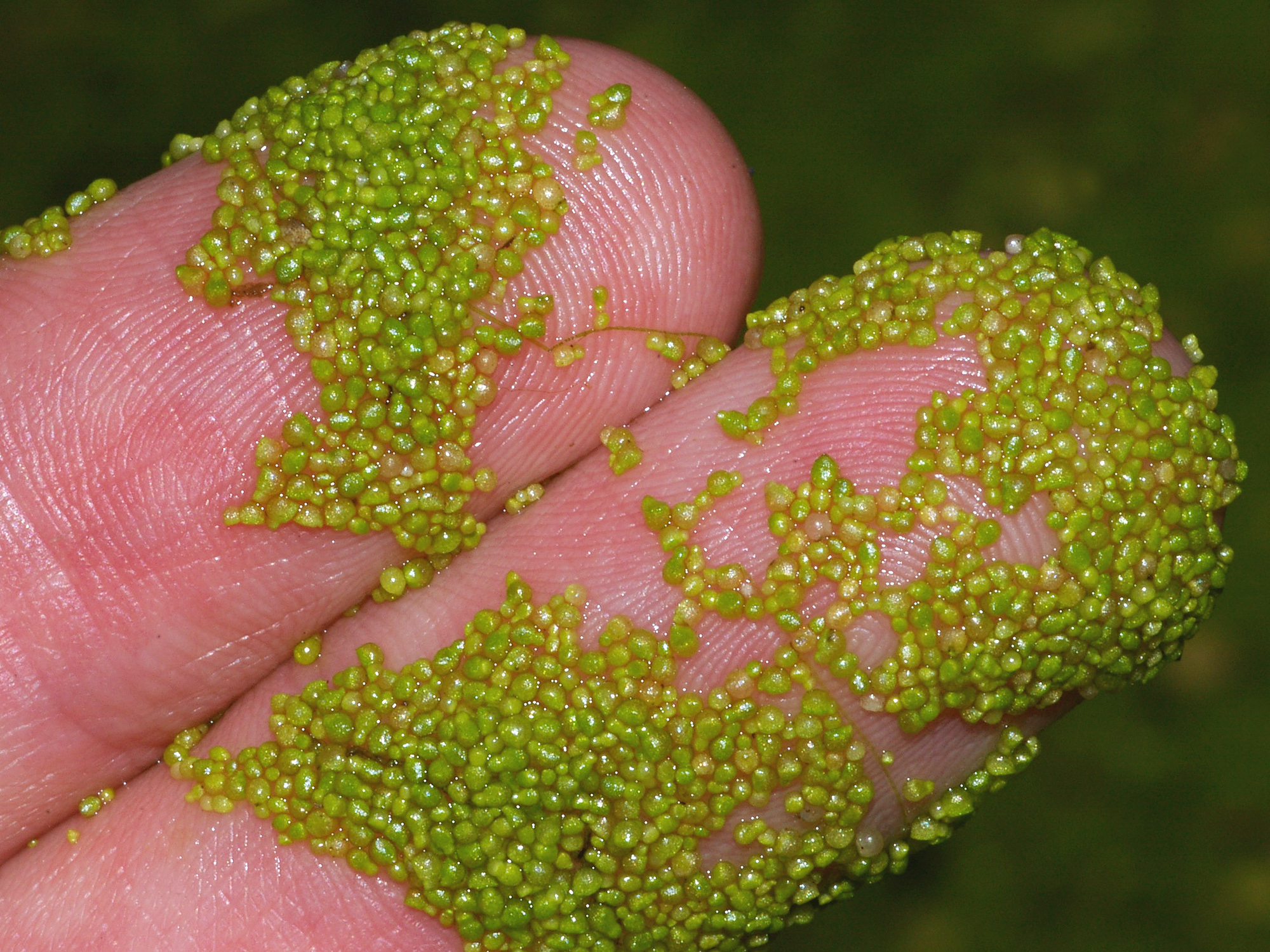

Conservation status
- Least Concern (IUCN 3.1)

Scientific classification
- Kingdom: Plantae
- Clade: Embryophytes
- Clade: Tracheophytes
- Clade: Spermatophytes
- Clade: Angiosperms
- Clade: Monocots
- Order: Alismatales
- Family: Araceae
- Genus: Wolffia
- Species: W. arrhiza

Binomial name
- Wolffia arrhiza (L.) Horkel ex Wimm.

Synonyms
- Bruniera vivipara Franch.; Horkelia arrhiza (L.) Druce; Lemna arrhiza L.; Lemna microscopica Schur; Lenticula arrhiza (L.) Lam.; Wolffia delilii Miq.; Wolffia michelii Schleid.

= Wolffia arrhiza =

Species of flowering plant

Wolffia arrhiza, commonly known as rootless duckweed or spotless watermeal, is a species of flowering plant in the family Araceae, which includes other water-loving plants such as Lemna and Pistia. It is the smallest vascular plant on Earth. Native to Europe, Africa, and parts of Asia, it has also become naturalised in various other regions around the globe.

== Description ==
Wolffia arrhiza is an aquatic plant which grows in quiet water bodies such as ponds. The plant's green part, known as the frond, is a spherical structure about 1 mm wide. It has a flat top that allows it to float on the water's surface. It has a few parallel rows of stomata. There is no root. The plant produces a tiny flower, complete with one stamen and one pistil. Many morphologists consider these to be an inflorescence of one tiny male flower 0.33 mm in height, with a single female flower 0.3 mm diameter; the smallest inflorescence to be reported. It often multiplies by vegetative reproduction, with the rounded part budding off into a new individual. In cooler conditions, the plant becomes dormant and sinks to the bottom of the water body to overwinter as a turion. As a mixotroph, it can produce its own energy by photosynthesis or absorb it from the environment in the form of dissolved carbon.

== Taxonomy ==
Wolffia arrhiza was first described in 1771 by Linnaeus as Lemna arrhiza in the genus Lemna, known for several duckweed species. It was transferred to the current genus Wolffia in the 19th century based on works of Johann Horkel and the third edition of the Flora von Schlesien preußischen und österreichischen Antheils by Christian Friedrich Heinrich Wimmer in 1857.

== Human uses ==
This tiny plant is a nutritious food. Its green part is about 40% protein by dry weight and its turion is about 40% starch. It contains many amino acids important to the human diet, relatively large amounts of dietary minerals and trace elements such as calcium, magnesium, and zinc, and vitamin B_{12}. It has long been used as a cheap food source in Myanmar, Laos, and Thailand, where it is known as khai-nam ("eggs of the water"). The plant is prolific in its reproduction, growing in floating mats that can be harvested every 3 to 4 days; it has been shown to double its population in less than four days in vitro.

It is also useful as a form of agricultural and municipal water treatment. It is placed in effluent from black tiger shrimp farms to absorb and metabolize pollutants. The plants grow quickly and take up large amounts of nitrogen and phosphorus from the water. The plants that grow in the wastewater can then be used as feed for animals, such as carp, Nile tilapia, and chickens.
