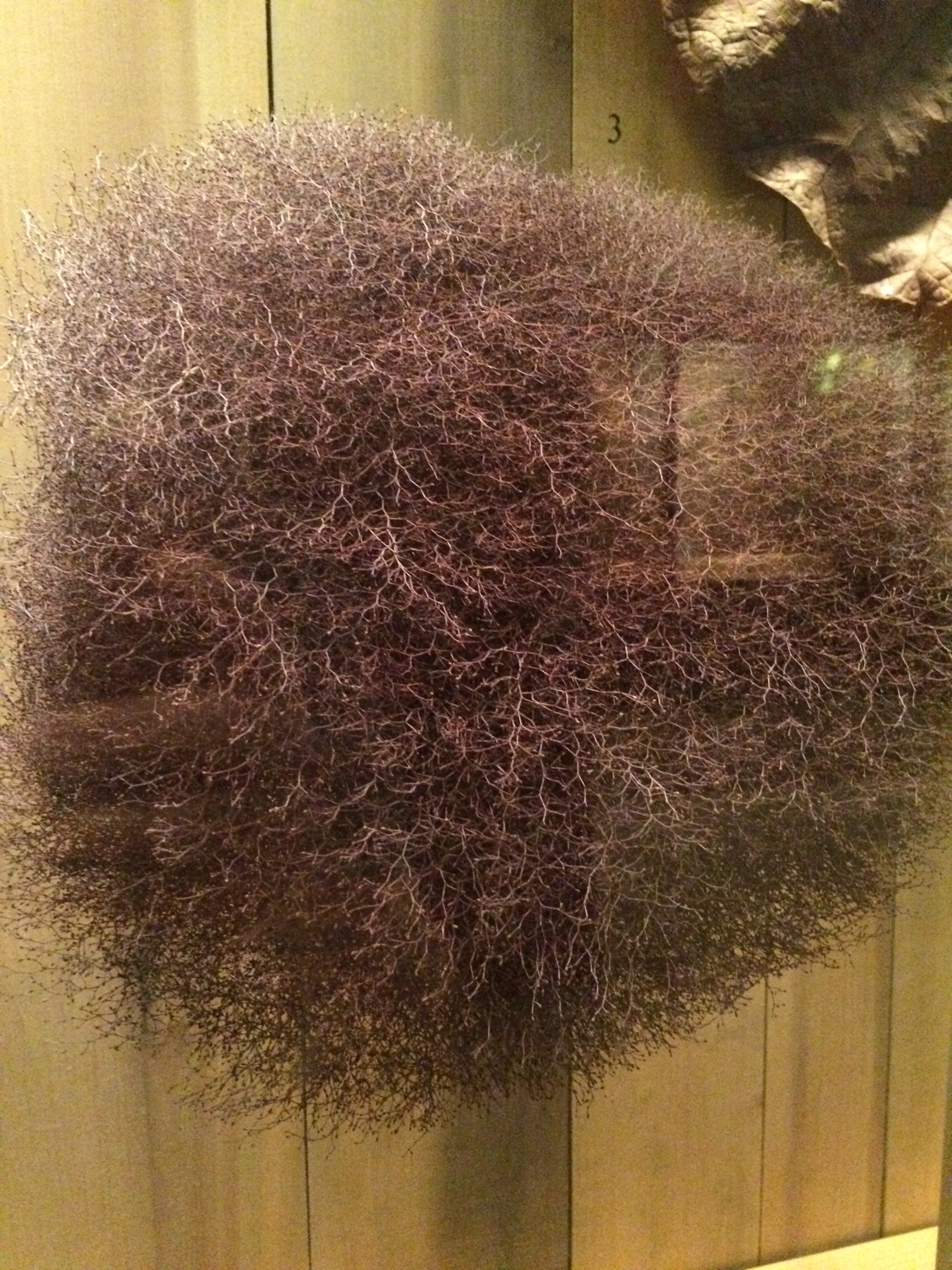
- Eriogonum parishii (Mountainmist) at Field Museum

Scientific classification
- Kingdom: Plantae
- Clade: Tracheophytes
- Clade: Angiosperms
- Clade: Eudicots
- Order: Caryophyllales
- Family: Polygonaceae
- Genus: Eriogonum
- Species: E. parishii

Binomial name
- Eriogonum parishii S.Wats.

= Eriogonum parishii =

Species of wild buckwheat

Eriogonum parishii is a species of wild buckwheat known by the common name mountainmist.

== Distribution ==
It is found mainly in southern California, where it grows in many of the mountain ranges from the Sierra Nevada, White Mountains and Inyo Mountains, west through the Transverse Ranges and Peninsular Ranges. It is also known from the southern Peninsular Ranges in Baja California, and in Yavapai County, Arizona.

It grows in various types of mountain slope habitat, such as sagebrush and chaparral, generally on granite sands.

== Description ==
Eriogonum parishi is an annual herb producing clumps of spreading hairless green stems which are intricately branched. The hairy oval leaves are located around the base of the stems and are 2 to 6 centimeters long.

The inflorescence is a spreading array of clusters of tiny pink to reddish flowers with darker red midribs. Each individual flower is generally under a millimeter wide and fuzzy in texture.
