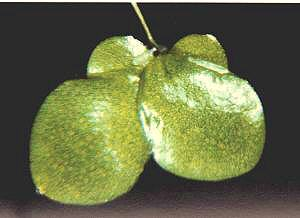

Conservation status
- Least Concern (IUCN 3.1)

- Apparently Secure (NatureServe)

Scientific classification
- Kingdom: Plantae
- Clade: Tracheophytes
- Clade: Angiosperms
- Clade: Monocots
- Order: Alismatales
- Family: Araceae
- Genus: Lemna
- Species: L. gibba

Binomial name
- Lemna gibba L.

= Lemna gibba =

Species of flowering plant

Lemna gibba, the gibbous duckweed, swollen duckweed, or fat duckweed, is a species of Lemna (duckweed). It has a simple plant body, known as a thallus, which floats on the surface of the water and measures 3–5 mm (0.12–0.20 in) in diameter. A single root hangs down into the water. Found in a wide range of still or slow-flowing water bodies, this common duckweed can also grow on mud or damp rocks.

== Distribution ==
Distribution is in temperate areas in Europe, including Britain, to the Himalayas, Africa, South America, and North America. This duckweed is one of Britain's most common small water plants, which forms familiar green mats covering stagnant water bodies. Widespread throughout Great Britain, but is absent from much of Scotland and Shetland. In Ireland, it is found mainly in the north and east. Elsewhere, the species has a very wide global distribution, absent only from polar areas and the tropics.

Distribution information for this species can be accessed via the Charms of Duckweed (worldwide) and National Biodiversity Network Gateway (Britain only).

This species spreads mainly through vegetative reproduction, but flowers are occasionally produced in shallow water exposed to full sun. When covering the entire surface of a pond, it can make the water appear solid, and in parts of the north-west of England, children were scared away from such ponds by the myth of Jenny Green-teeth, a pond elf or monster whose presence was indicated by duckweed; she was said to lure children into ponds and drown them.
