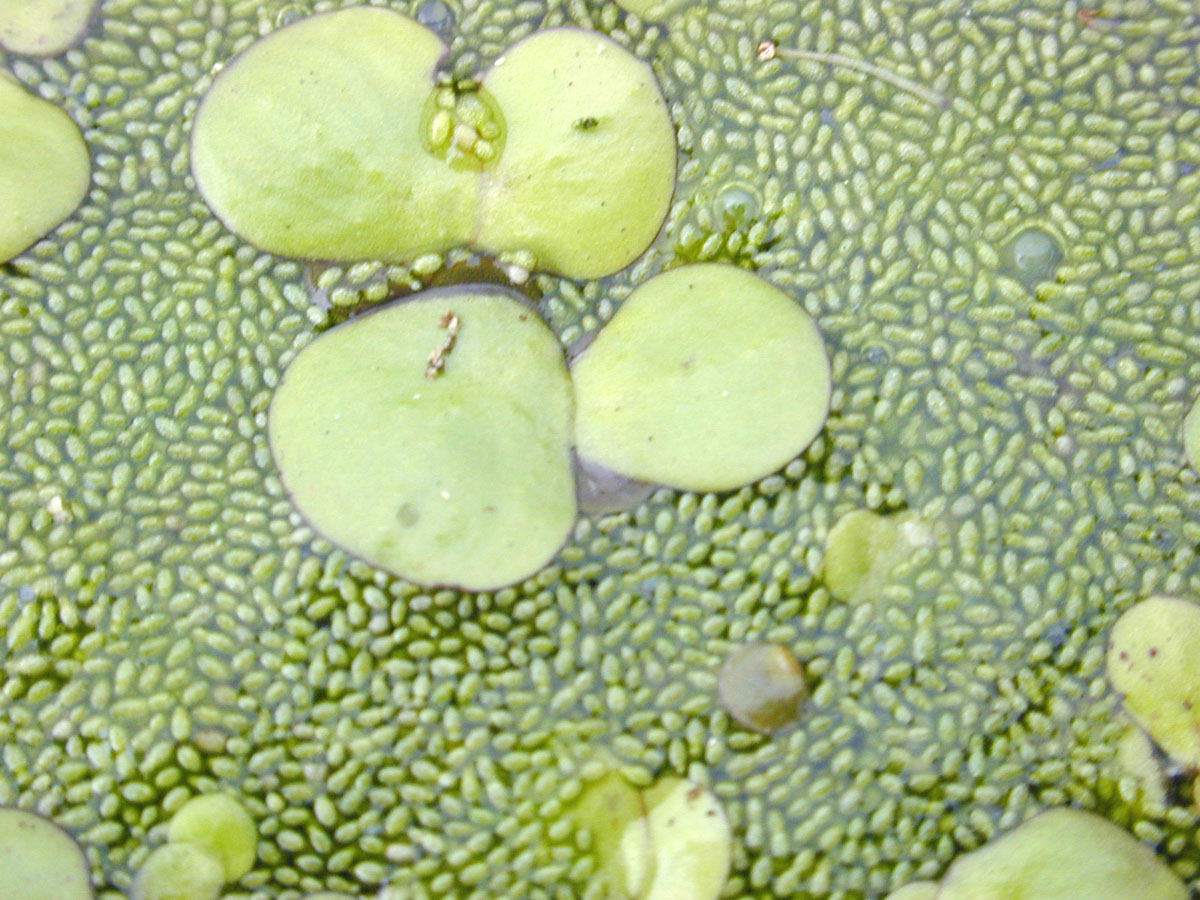
- W. globosa (small) with Spirodela polyrrhiza (larger)

Conservation status
- Least Concern (IUCN 3.1)

Scientific classification
- Kingdom: Plantae
- Clade: Embryophytes
- Clade: Tracheophytes
- Clade: Spermatophytes
- Clade: Angiosperms
- Clade: Monocots
- Order: Alismatales
- Family: Araceae
- Genus: Wolffia
- Species: W. globosa

Binomial name
- Wolffia globosa (Roxb.) Hartog & Plas

= Wolffia globosa =

Species of flowering plant

Wolffia globosa is a species of flowering plant known by the common names Asian watermeal and duckweed. It is native to Asia and is found in parts of the Americas and Africa, where it is an introduced species. It grows in mats on the surface of calm, freshwater bodies, such as ponds, lakes, and marshes. It is a very tiny, oval-shaped plant with no leaves, stems, or roots. The body of the plant, a transparent green frond, is less than a millimeter wide. In one human experiment, processed W. globosa was reported to provide dietary protein and vitamin B_{12}.

Wolffia globosa has been described as the world's smallest flowering plant, at 0.1–0.2 mm (0.004–0.008 in) in diameter.

Known in Thai as Pham (ผำ), it is a popular item in Thai cuisine, especially in Isan.

== Global distribution and invasive status ==
Wolffia globosa is native to Southeast Asia but has established populations in multiple continents, including parts of North and South America, Africa, and Oceania. Its remarkable adaptability allows it to thrive in diverse freshwater environments, often forming dense mats on ponds, lakes, and slow-moving rivers. In some regions, such as Florida (US), W. globosa is recognized as an introduced species and is monitored for its potential ecological impacts, including competition with native aquatic plants and effects on local biodiversity.

== Molecular biology and genomic insights ==
Recent advances in molecular biology have facilitated the sequencing of the Wolffia globosa genome, revealing unique genetic adaptations that support its minute size and rapid growth. Genomic studies have identified specific genes associated with efficient nutrient uptake, reduced structural complexity, and high reproductive capacity. These findings provide new insights into the evolutionary reduction of plant body plans and have implications for both plant developmental biology and biotechnological applications.

== Protein content and food security applications ==
Wolffia globosa contains exceptionally high protein levels—up to 40% of its dry weight—making it a promising candidate for future food security. It is rich in essential amino acids and micronutrients, including vitamin B_{12}, and can be cultivated rapidly in minimal space. Recent research highlights its potential as a sustainable plant-based protein source, especially in regions facing nutritional deficiencies. Pilot studies in Southeast Asia have explored its use in traditional and novel food products, positioning W. globosa as a model for "future foods".
