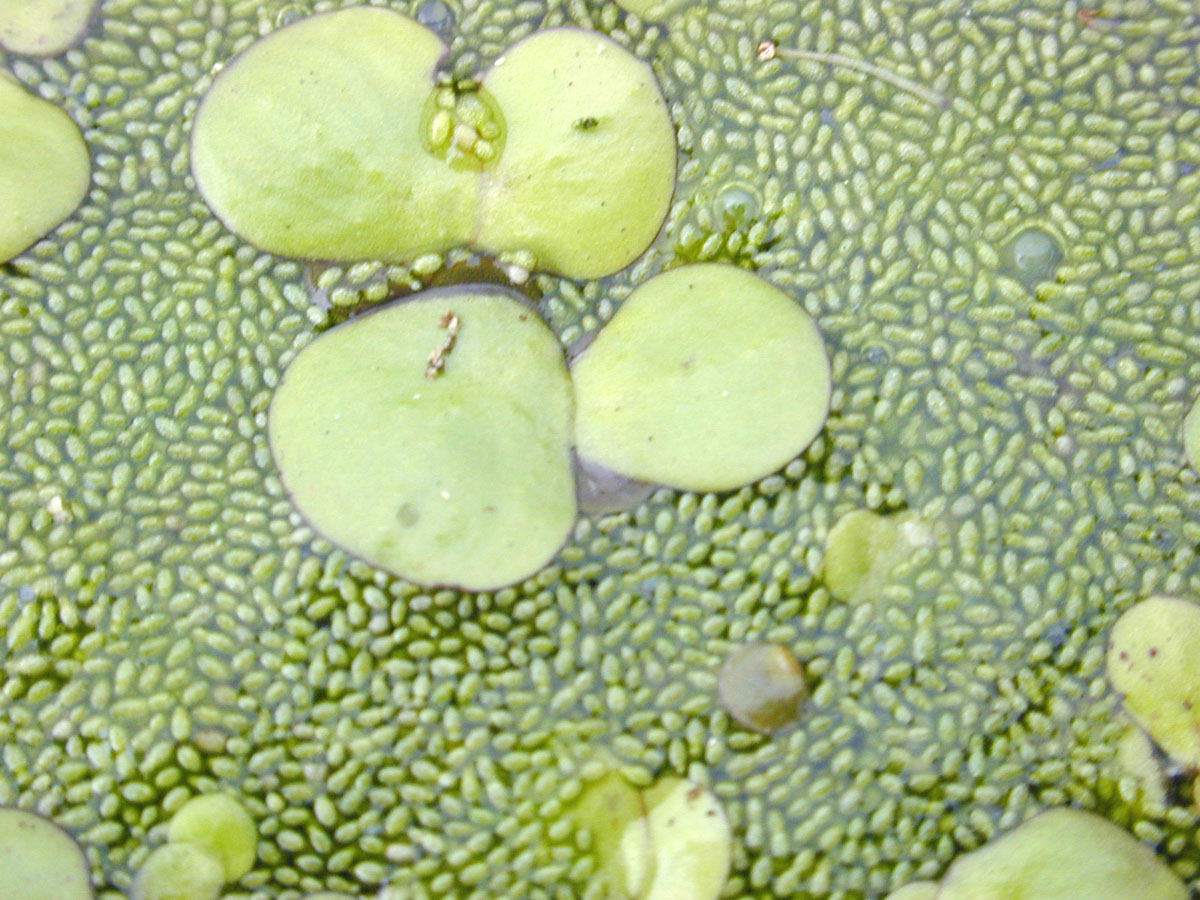
- The largest and smallest species of Lemnoideae; Spirodela polyrrhiza and Wolffia globosa

Scientific classification
- Kingdom: Plantae
- Clade: Tracheophytes
- Clade: Angiosperms
- Clade: Monocots
- Order: Alismatales
- Family: Araceae
- Subfamily: Lemnoideae

Genera
- Lemna; Spirodela; Wolffia; Wolffiella

Synonyms
- Lemnaceae

= Lemnoideae =

Subfamily of aquatic plants

Lemnoideae is a subfamily of flowering aquatic plants, known as duckweeds, water lentils, or water lenses. They float on or just beneath the surface of still or slow-moving bodies of fresh water and wetlands. Also known as bayroot, they arose from within the arum or aroid family (Araceae), so often are classified as the subfamily Lemnoideae within the family Araceae. Other classifications, particularly those created prior to the end of the twentieth century, place them as a separate family, Lemnaceae.

These plants have a simple structure, lacking an obvious stem or leaves. The greater part of each plant is a small organized "thallus" or "frond" structure only a few cells thick, often with air pockets (aerenchyma) that allow it to float on or just under the water surface. Depending on the species, each plant may have no root or may have one or more simple rootlets.

Reproduction is mostly by asexual budding (vegetative reproduction), which occurs from a meristem enclosed at the base of the frond. Occasionally, three tiny "flowers" consisting of two stamens and a pistil are produced, by which sexual reproduction occurs. Some view this "flower" as a pseudanthium, or reduced inflorescence, with three flowers that are distinctly either female or male and which are derived from the spadix in the Araceae. Evolution of the duckweed inflorescence remains ambiguous due to the considerable evolutionary reduction of these plants from their earlier relatives.

The flower of the duckweed genus Wolffia is the smallest known, measuring merely 0.3 mm long. The fruit produced through this occasional reproduction is a utricle, and a seed is produced in a bag containing air that facilitates flotation.

== Duckweed in natural environments ==
One of the more important factors influencing the distribution of wetland plants, and aquatic plants in particular, is nutrient availability. Duckweeds tend to be associated with fertile, even eutrophic conditions. They can be spread by sticking to the feathers of waterfowl and the skin or fur of other amphibious animals, and thus transported inadvertently to new bodies of water. The plants may also be transported by flooding or other moving water. In water bodies with constant currents or overflow, the plants are carried down the channels and do not typically proliferate greatly, as they prefer still waters. However, in some locations, a cyclical pattern exists, driven by weather patterns, in which the plants proliferate greatly during periods of low water movement before they are carried away as rainy periods ensue.

Duckweed is an important, high-protein food source for waterfowl and many species of fish. The tiny plants provide cover for the vulnerable fry and tadpoles of many fishes and amphibians. The plants are used as shelter by pond species, such as bullfrogs and newts, and fish such as bluegills. They also provide shade and, although frequently confused with them, can reduce certain light-generated growths of photoautotrophic algae.

== Use as human food crop ==
Duckweed is consumed in Laos, Thailand, and Myanmar. It produces more protein per square meter than soybeans, contains multiple nutrients, and can be substituted for salads or typical vegetables, making it a possible food source for humans. It is cultivated as a vegetable in Israel.

NASA's Caves of Mars Project identified duckweed as a candidate for Martian food production projects.

== Invasive species ==
Despite some of these benefits, because duckweed thrives in high-nutrient wetland environments, the plants can be seen as a nuisance species when conditions favor excessive proliferation in environments that are traditionally low in nutrients or oligotrophic.

One example of this problem occurs within the Everglades, a mostly oligotrophic environment, when excess chemicals (that include fertilizers) are carried by storm runoff, or surface runoff, into its waterways.

Urban runoff and agricultural pollution then begin to introduce increased levels of nutrients into the surrounding wetlands and waterways, which can cause a disruption to native ecology. These conditions allow for the invasion of a fast growing species such as duckweed to establish themselves, spread, and displace other native species such as sawgrass, and over time, result in widespread changes to the ecology of native sawgrass and slough habitats within the Everglades.

== Taxonomy ==
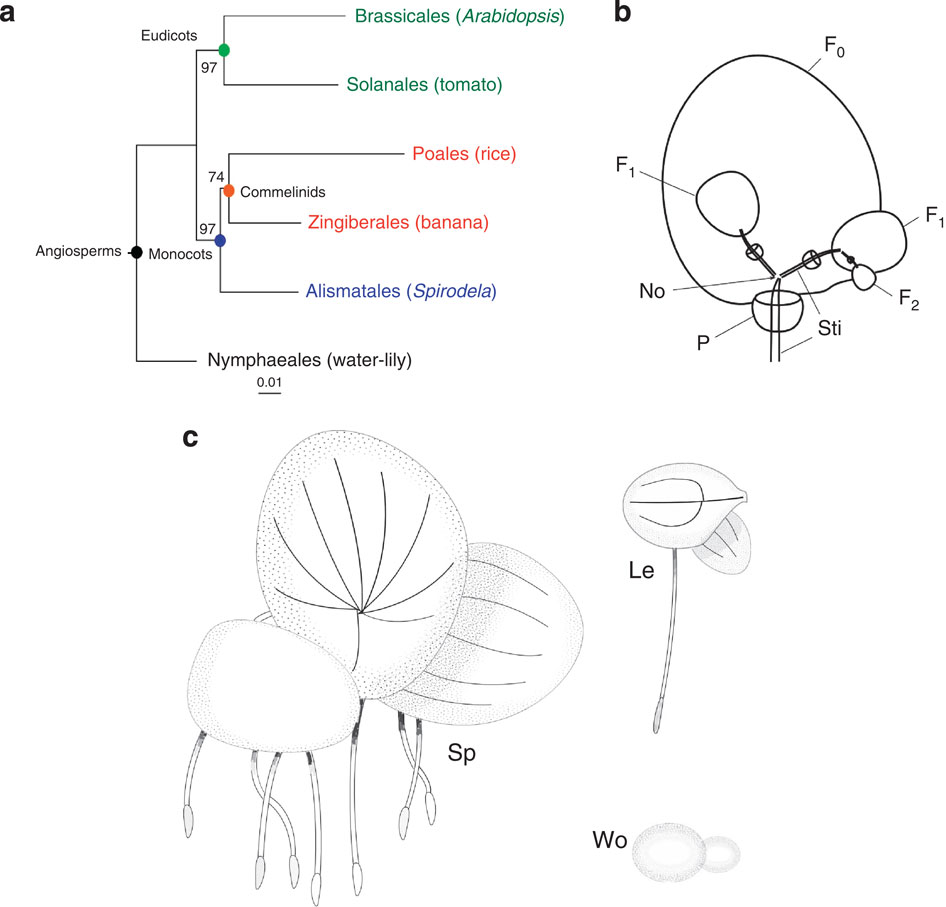
Duckweeds belong to the order Alismatales and the family Araceae. (a) is a phylogenetic tree based on ribulose-1, 5-bisphosphate carboxylase large-subunit genes. (b) is a schematic ventral view of Spirodela, to show the clonal, vegetative propagation of duckweeds. Daughter fronds (F1) originate from the vegetative node (No), from the mother frond F0 and remain attached to it by the stipule (Sti), which eventually breaks off, thereby releasing a new plant cluster. Daughter fronds may already initiate new fronds (F2) themselves before full maturity. Roots are attached at the prophyllum (P). (c) shows the progressive reduction from a leaf-like body with several veins and unbranched roots to a thallus-like morphology in the Lemnoideae.

The duckweeds have long been a taxonomic mystery, and usually have been considered to be their own family, the Lemnaceae. They primarily reproduce asexually. Flowers, if present at all, are small. Roots are either very much reduced, or absent entirely. They were suspected of being related to the Araceae as long ago as 1876, but until the advent of molecular phylogeny, testing this hypothesis was difficult.

Starting in 1995, studies began to confirm their placement in the Araceae and since then, most systematists have considered them to be part of that family, although in 2021, recognition again as a separate family was proposed.

Their position within their family has been slightly less clear; however, several twenty-first century studies place them in the position shown below. Although they are in the same family as Pistia, another aquatic plant, they are not closely related.

- Araceae
  - - Gymnostachydoideae
    - Orontioideae (skunk cabbages and golden club)
  - - Lemnoideae (duckweeds)
    - most of the rest of the family Araceae

The genera of duckweeds are: Spirodela, Landoltia, Lemna, Wolffiella, and Wolffia.

Duckweed genome sizes have a ten-fold range (150~1,500 MB), potentially representing diploids to octaploids. The ancestral genus of Spirodela has the smallest genome size (150 MB, similar to Arabidopsis thaliana), while the most derived genus, Wolffia, contains plants with the largest genome size (1,500 MB). DNA sequencing has shown that Wolffiella and Wolffia are more closely related than the others. Spirodela is at the basal position of the taxon, followed by Lemna, Wolffiella, and Wolffia, which is the most derived.

- - Spirodela
  - - Lemna
    - - Wolffiella
      - Wolffia

To identify different duckweed genomes, a DNA-based molecular identification system was developed based on seven plastid-markers proposed by the Consortium for the Barcode of Life. The atpF-atpH non-coding spacer was chosen as a universal DNA barcoding marker for species-level identification of duckweeds.

== Fossil record ==
Extinct free-floating aquatic plants and pollen with affinities to the Lemnoideae first appear in the fossil record during the Late Cretaceous (Maastrichtian) as evidenced by floating leaves described as Aquaephyllum auriculatum from Patagonia, Argentina, and the lemnoid pollen genus Pandaniidites.

Fossils of floating leaves with rootlets from the Paleocene of southern Saskatchewan, Canada, that were originally described as Lemna (Spirodela) scutata by John William Dawson in 1885, have been redescribed as Limnobiophyllum. In addition to western North America, Limnobiophyllum has been reported from the Paleocene of eastern Russia and the Miocene of the Czech Republic. Unusually complete specimens from the Paleocene of Alberta, Canada, range from single leaves up to about 4 cm (1.6 in) in diameter to rosettes of up to four leaves, some of which were connected to adjacent plants by stolons, and a few of which bear remains of flowers with anthers that contain Pandaniidites pollen. Occurrences of lemnoid seeds described as Lemnospermum have also been reported.

== Research and applications ==
Research and applications of duckweeds are promoted by two international organizations, The International Lemna Association and the International Steering Committee on Duckweed Research and Applications.

In July 2008, the U.S. Department of Energy (DOE) Joint Genome Institute announced that the Community Sequencing Program would fund sequencing of the genome of the giant duckweed, Spirodela polyrhiza. This was a priority project for DOE in 2009. The research was intended to facilitate new biomass and bioenergy programs. The results were published in February 2014. They provide insight into how this plant is adapted to rapid growth and an aquatic lifestyle.

=== Potential clean energy source ===
Duckweed is being studied by researchers around the world as a possible source of clean energy. In the U.S., in addition to being the subject of study by the DOE, both Rutgers University and North Carolina State University have ongoing projects to determine whether duckweed might be a source of cost-effective, clean, renewable energy. Duckweed is a good candidate as a biofuel because it grows rapidly, produces five to six times as much starch as corn per unit of area, and does not contribute to global warming. The rapid nature of duckweed has shown that it can double biomass within four and a half days. Duckweed removes carbon dioxide from the atmosphere, and it may have value for climate change mitigation.

=== Filtration of contaminants and nutrients ===
The plants can provide nitrate removal, if cropped, and the duckweeds are important in the process of bioremediation because they grow rapidly, absorbing excess mineral nutrients, particularly nitrogen and phosphates. For these reasons, they are touted as water purifiers of untapped value.

The Swiss Department of Water and Sanitation in Developing Countries, associated with the Swiss Federal Institute for Environmental Science and Technology, asserts that as well as the food and agricultural values, duckweed also may be used for wastewater treatment to capture toxins and for odor control, and that if a mat of duckweed is maintained during harvesting for removal of the toxins captured thereby, it prevents the development of algae and controls the breeding of mosquitoes. The same publication provides an extensive list of references for many duckweed-related topics.

These plants also may play a role in conservation of water because a cover of duckweed will reduce evaporation of water when compared to the rate of a similarly sized water body with a clear surface.

Duckweed also functions as a bioremediator by effectively filtering contaminants such as bacteria, nitrogen, phosphates, and other nutrients from naturally occurring bodies of water, constructed wetlands, and wastewater.

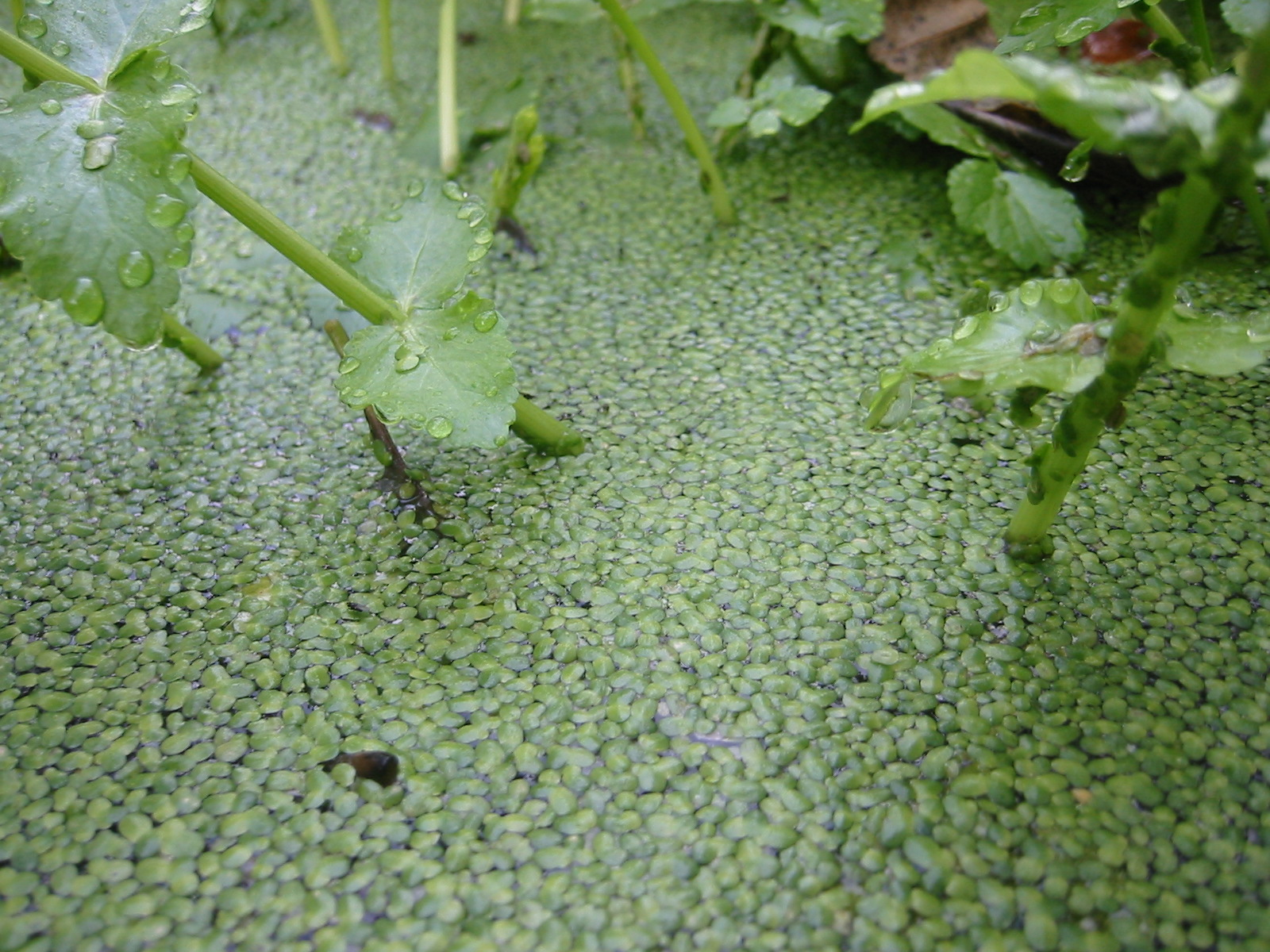
Common duckweed in Galicia, Spain

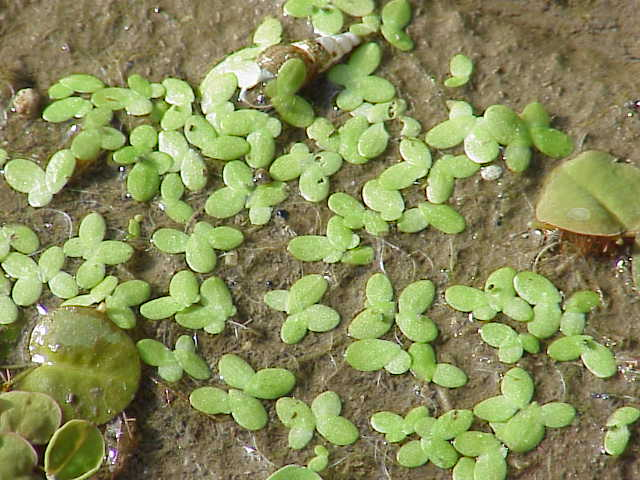
Lemna minor

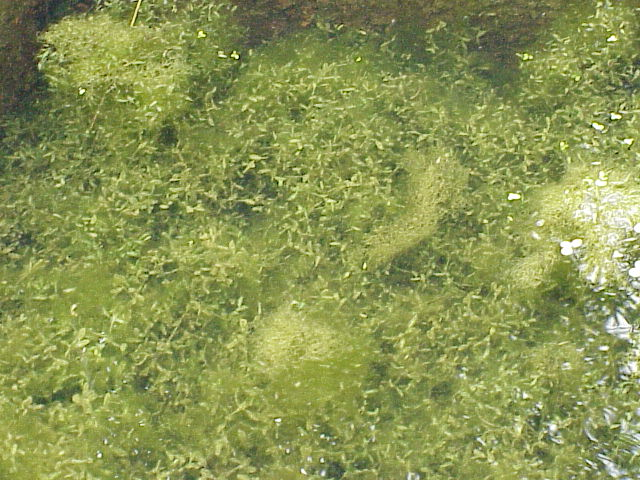
Lemna trisulca

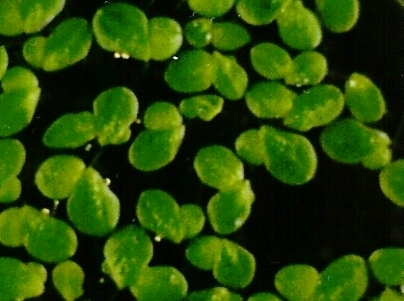
Lemna gibba

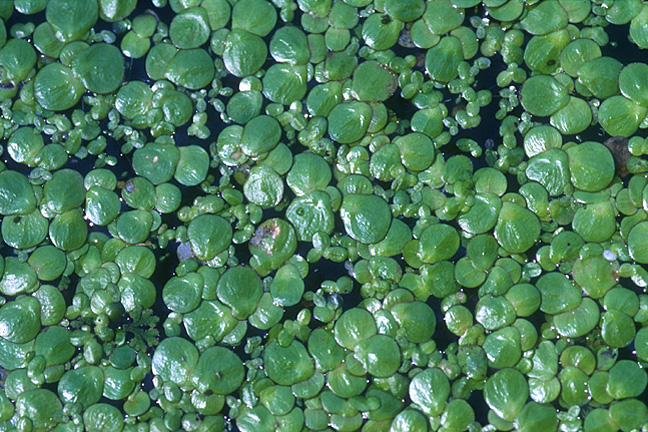
Spirodela polyrhiza

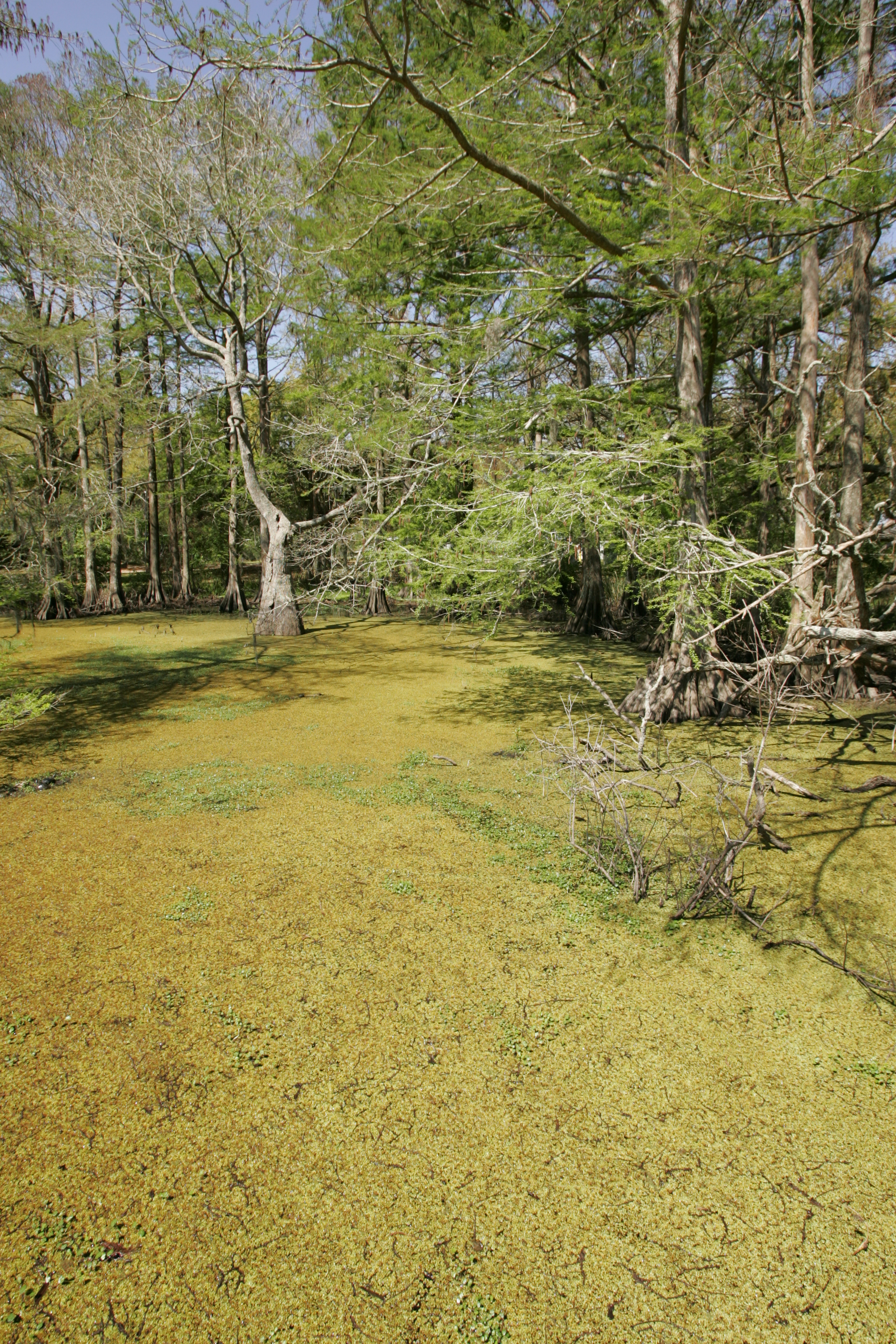
Duckweed-covered water edged with several bald cypress trees

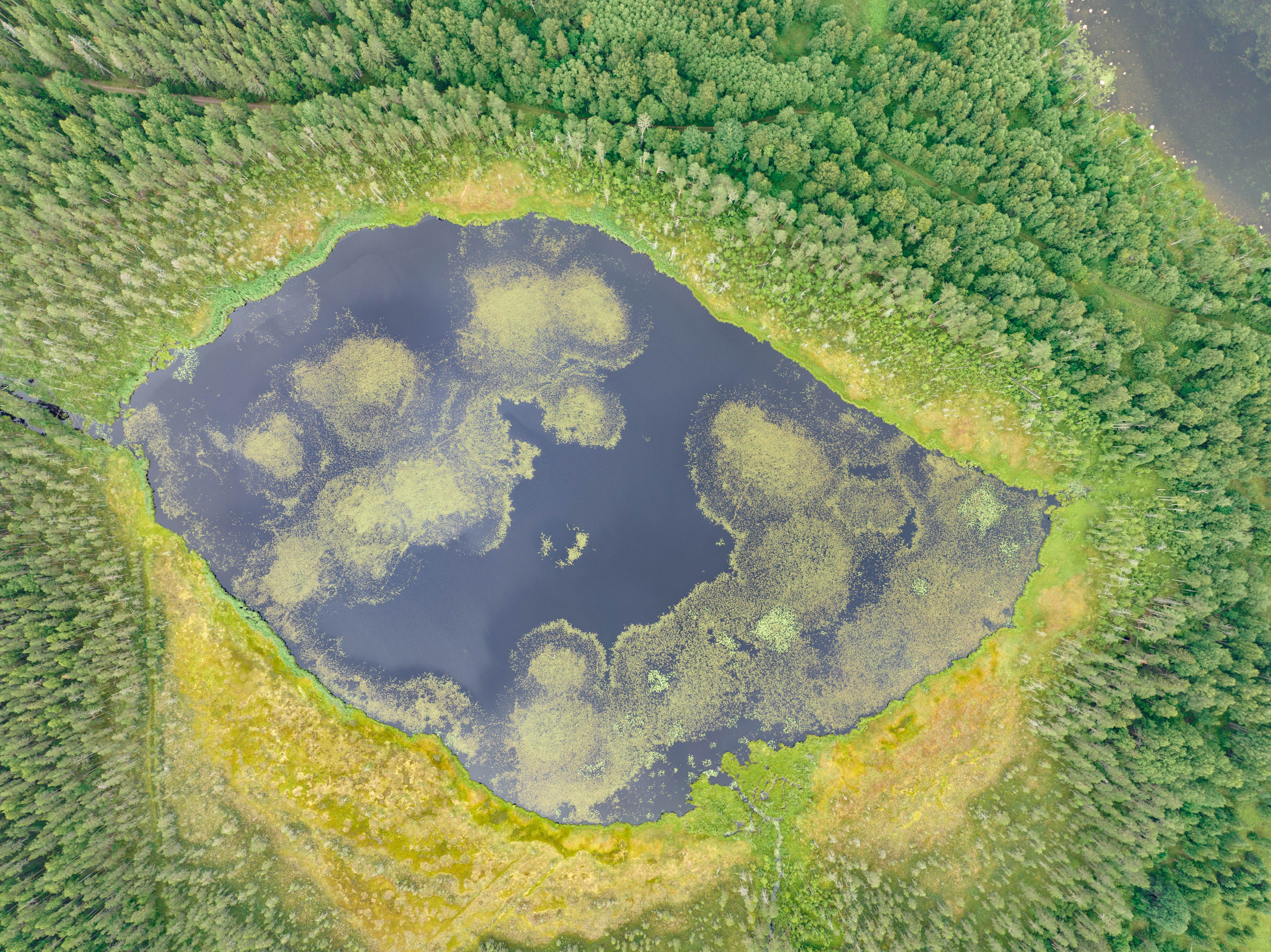
Myllylampi lake with duckweed "islands" photographed from above. Orusjärvi, Pitkyarantsky District, Karelia, Russia.

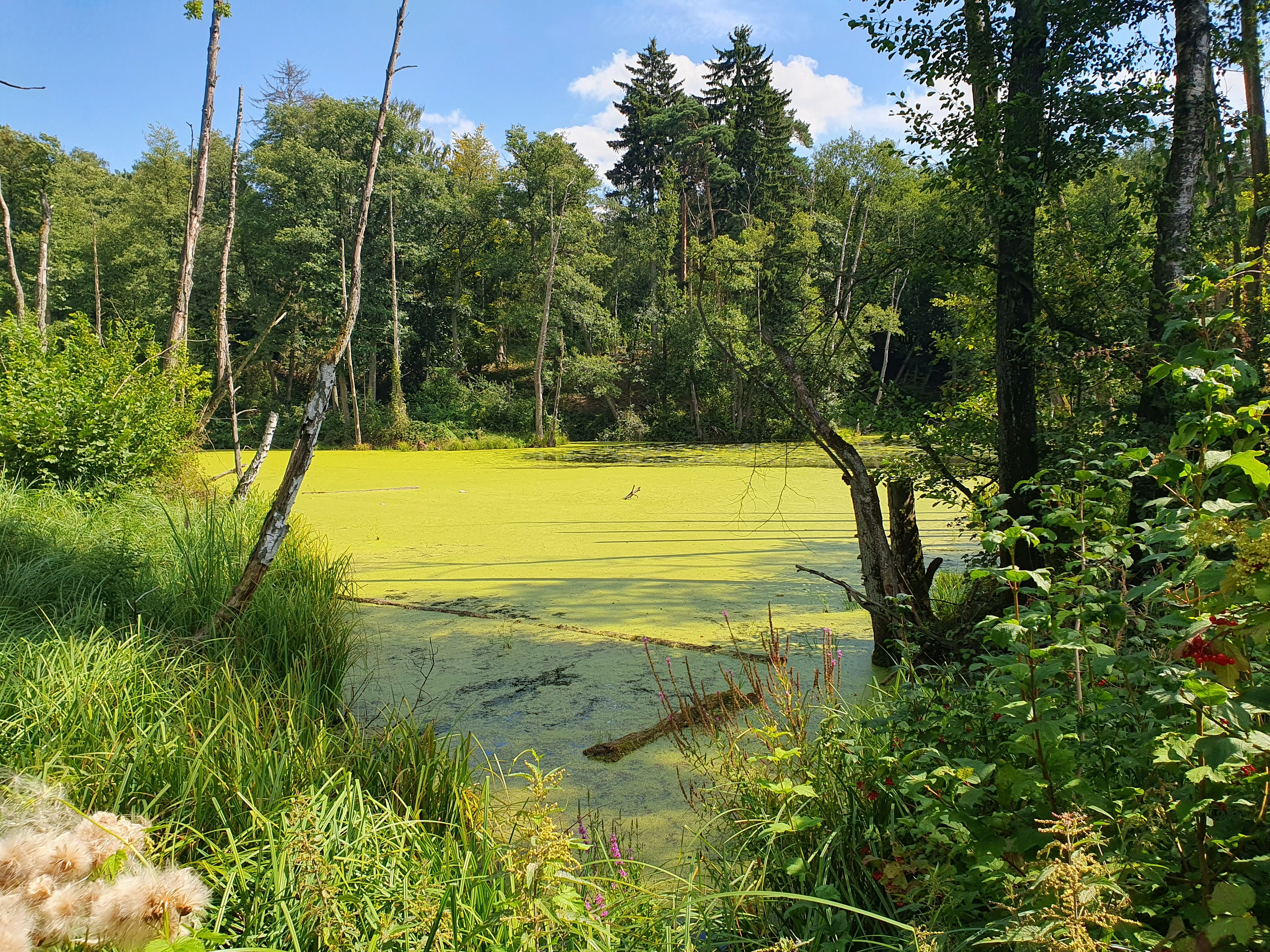
Duckweed-covered pond near Chodzież, Poland

A start-up, microTERRA, based in Mexico has attempted to use duckweed to clean the water in privately owned aquaculture farms. The plants use nitrogen and phosphorus produced from fish waste as fertilizer, while simultaneously cleaning the water as it grows. The water can then be reused by the aquaculture farmers, and the duckweed, which has a 35-42% protein content, can be harvested as a source of sustainable plant-based protein.

== See also ==
- Azolla
- Hyperaccumulators table – 3
- Neuston
- Phytoremediation
- Smallest organisms
- Wolffia globosa
