= Christoph Friedrich Hegelmaier =

German physician and botanist

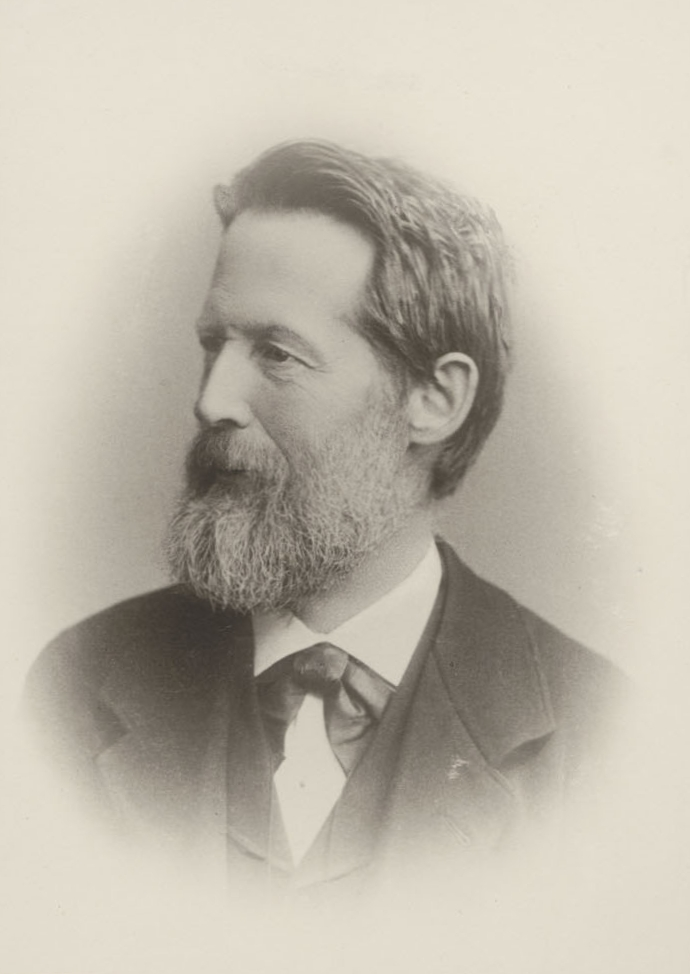
Christoph Friedrich Hegelmaier

Christoph Friedrich Hegelmaier (4 September 1833 – 26 May 1906) was a German physician and botanist who was a native of Sulzbach, Württemberg.

In 1857 he earned his doctorate from the University of Tübingen, and later was a military doctor in Ulm. In 1864 he received his habilitation at Tübingen, where in 1866 he became an associate professor of botany.

He was an authority on the plant family Lemnaceae, and in 1868 published the treatise Die Lemnaceen: Eine monographische Untersuchung. Other important works by Hegelmaier include a monograph of the genus Callitriche, called Monographie der Gattung Callitriche (1864), and a highly regarded study involving plant embryology, titled Vergleichenden Untersuchungen über Entwicklung dikotyledoner Keime ("Comparative studies on development of dicotyledonous seeds", 1878). He issued an exsiccata-like series called Iter Gallo-Hispanicum (1875).

Today his herbarium is kept at the Museum of Natural History in Stuttgart.
