= Marine botany =

Science of ocean plant life

Marine Botany and Sea-side Objects

Marine botany is the study of plant life in a marine environment. It includes the study of marine algae, seagrasses, and other aquatic plants of the ocean, and their distributions and natural environment.

It is a branch of marine biology and botany.

== Marine ecology ==
Marine ecology and marine botany's area of study includes:

- Benthic zone
- Coral reefs
- Kelp forests
- Mangroves
- Phytoplankton
- Salt marshes
- Sea grass
- Seaweed

== See also ==
- Aquatic plants
- Aquatic ecology
- "Aquatic Botany"
- Phycology
- Index: Marine botany
- Marine primary production
