= Algology =

Algology may refer to:

- Algology (medicine), the study of pain
- Phycology, also known as algology, the study of algae
- Marine botany, also known as phycology and/or algology, the study of algae
