= Aquatic plant =

Plant that has adapted to living in an aquatic environment

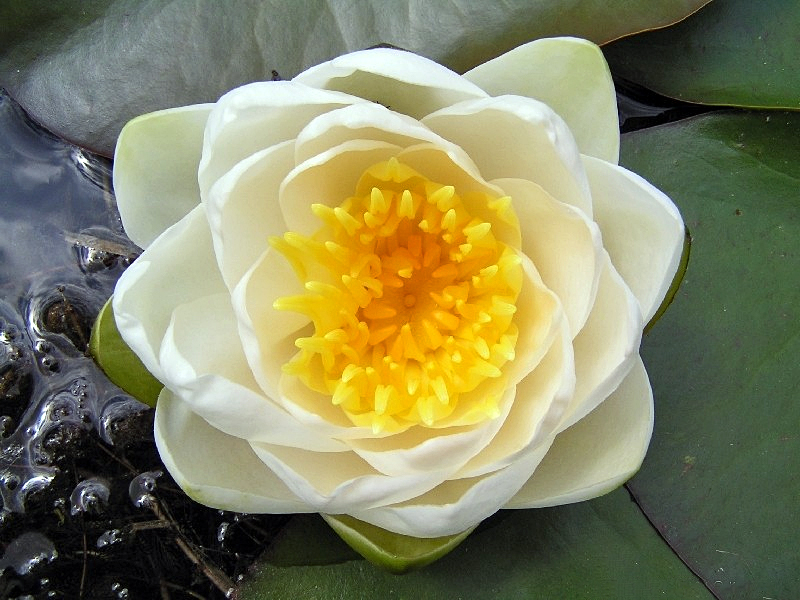
The flower of Nymphaea alba, a species of water lily

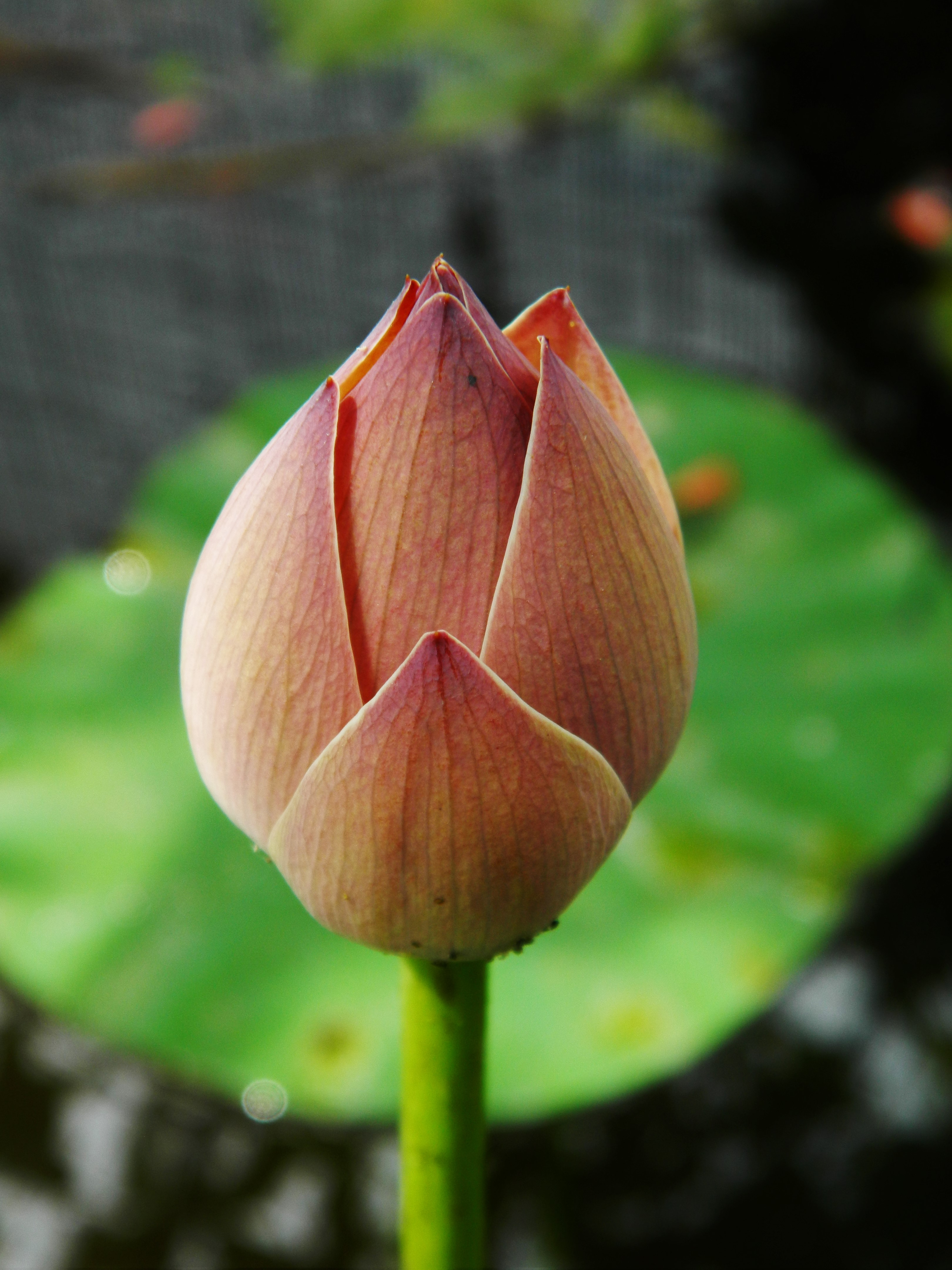
Bud of Nelumbo nucifera, an aquatic plant

Aquatic plants, also referred to as hydrophytes, are plants — vascular or non-vascular — that have adapted to live in aquatic environments (saltwater or freshwater). In lakes, rivers and wetlands, aquatic vegetations provide cover for aquatic animals such as fish, amphibians and aquatic insects, create substrate for benthic invertebrates, produce oxygen via photosynthesis, and serve as food for some herbivorous wildlife. Familiar examples of aquatic plants include waterlily, lotus, duckweeds, mosquito fern, floating heart, water milfoils, mare's tail, water lettuce, and water hyacinth.

Aquatic plants require special adaptations for prolonged inundation in water, and for floating at the water surface. The most common adaptation is the presence of lightweight internal packing cells, aerenchyma, but floating leaves and finely dissected leaves are also common. Aquatic plants only thrive in water or in soil that is frequently saturated, and are therefore a common component of swamps and marshlands.

== Evolution ==
Aquatic plants have adapted to live in either freshwater or saltwater. Aquatic vascular plants have originated on multiple occasions in different plant families; they can be ferns or angiosperms (including both monocots and dicots). The only angiosperms capable of growing completely submerged in seawater are the seagrasses. Examples are found in genera such as Thalassia and Zostera. An aquatic origin of angiosperms is supported by the evidence that several of the earliest known fossil angiosperms were aquatic. Aquatic plants are phylogenetically well dispersed across the angiosperms, with at least 50 independent origins, although they comprise less than 2% of the angiosperm species. Archaefructus represents one of the oldest, most complete angiosperm fossils which is around 125 million years old. These plants require special adaptations for living submerged in water or floating at the surface.

== Morphology ==
Fully submerged aquatic plants have little need for stiff or woody tissue as they are able to maintain their position in the water using buoyancy typically from gas filled lacunaa or turgid aerenchyma cells. When removed from the water, such plants are typically limp and lose turgor rapidly.

Those living in rivers do, however, need sufficient structural xylem to avoid being damaged by fast flowing water and they also need strong mechanisms of attachment to avoid being uprooted by river flow.

Many fully submerged plants have finely dissected leaves, probably to reduce drag in rivers and to provide a much increased surface area for interchange of minerals and gasses. Some species of plants such as Ranunculus aquatilis have two different leaf forms which changes depending on growing conditions. Leaves are usually fully submerged and form a branch-like pattern that resembles a fan. They may also possess floating leaves that contain 3 to 5 lobes which are flat.

Some still-water plants can alter their position in the water column at different seasons. One notable example is water soldier, which rests as a rootless rosette on the bottom of the water body but slowly floats to the surface in late spring so that its inflorescence can emerge into the air. While it is ascending through the water column it produces roots and vegetative daughter plants by means of rhizomes. When flowering is complete, the plant descends through the water column and the roots atrophy.

In floating aquatic angiosperms, the leaves have evolved to only have stomata on the top surface to make use of atmospheric carbon dioxide. Gas exchange primarily occurs through the top surface of the leaf due to the position of the stomata, and the stomata are in a permanently open state. Due to their aquatic surroundings, the plants are not at risk of losing water through the stomata and therefore face no risk of dehydration. For carbon fixation, some aquatic angiosperms are able to uptake CO_{2} from bicarbonate in the water, a trait that does not exist in terrestrial plants. Angiosperms that use HCO_{3}- can keep CO_{2} levels satisfactory, even in basic environments with low carbon levels. The many possible classifications of aquatic plants are based upon morphology.

== Classification ==
As the term "plant" can be defined both sensu stricto (i.e. all chloroplastidians) and sensu strictissimo (i.e. only embryophytes) in common usage, aquatic plants can be classified into either macrophytes or microphytes, depending on whether they are large enough to be have macroscopic structures visible to the naked eye. Macrophytes include all aquatic embryophytes and complex multicellular green algae such as stoneworts (e.g. Chara and Nitellopsis), while microphytes include unicellular/filamentous green algae such as Spirogyra, Cladophora and Stigeoclonium.

=== Classification of macrophytes ===
Based on growth form, macrophytes can be characterized as:

- Emergent
- Submerged
  - Rooted: rooted to the substrate
  - Unrooted: free-floating in the water column
- Floating-leaved
- Free-floating

==== Emergent ====
- An emergent macrophyte is one which is embedded into the substrate but has enough stem height for its leaves and flowers to stand above the water surface and become exposed to air. Collectively, such plants are emergent vegetation. Examples of such plants include reeds and various species of mangroves.
  - This habit may have developed because the leaves can photosynthesize more efficiently in air and competition from submerged plants but often, the main aerial feature is the flower and the related reproductive process. The emergent habit permits pollination by wind or by flying insects.
  - There are many species of emergent plants, among them, the reed (Phragmites), Cyperus papyrus, Typha species, flowering rush and wild rice species. Some species, such as purple loosestrife, may grow in water as emergent plants but they are capable of flourishing in fens or simply in damp ground.

==== Submergent ====
- A submergent macrophyte is one that remains completely under water, with roots embedded to the substrate (rooted submerged) (e.g. Myriophyllum spicatum) or without any root system (unrooted submerged) (e.g. Ceratophyllum demersum). They can also grow up to the water's surface. Helophytes are plants that grow partly submerged in marshes and regrow from buds below the water surface. Fringing stands of tall vegetation by water basins and rivers may include helophytes. Examples include stands of Equisetum fluviatile, Glyceria maxima, Hippuris vulgaris, Sagittaria, Carex, Schoenoplectus, Sparganium, Acorus, yellow flag (Iris pseudacorus), Typha and Phragmites australis.
- Although seaweeds, which are large multicellular marine algae, have similar ecological functions to aquatic plants such as seagrass, they lack the specialized root/rhizoid system of plants. Instead, seaweeds have holdfasts that only serve as anchors and have no absorptive functions.

==== Floating-leaved ====
- A floating-leaved macrophyte is one that is rooted into the substrate but with stems that are not substantial enough to support the leaves and flowers above the water surface, which rely only on their own buoyancy to stay at the surface and gain exposure to air. Common floating-leaved macrophytes are water lilies (family Nymphaeaceae), pondweeds (family Potamogetonaceae).

==== Free-floating ====
- A free-floating macrophyte is one that is completely neustonic, i.e. floating on the water surface without any anchorage to the substrate.
- Free-floating macrophytes are found suspended on water surface with their root not attached to the substrate, sediment, or bottom of the water body. They may be easily blown by air and some may provide breeding ground for mosquitoes. Examples of free-floating plants include Lemna spp or Pistia spp. the latter commonly called water lettuce, water cabbage or Nile cabbage.

=== Classification of microphytes ===
Microphytes can be characterized as:

- Phytoplankton, also known as microalgae. Free-floating; drifting with water currents.
- Periphyton - a microphyte that lives and grows on the surface of rooted aquatic plants.
- Benthic algae - relatively sessile algae that inhabit the substrate or on surface of stones, snags or other underwater solids. Algae may be single celled such as diatoms or Desmids, or multi-celled such as Spirogyra or Cladophora. A few such as some of the diatoms have limited abilities to move over their substrate.

=== Additional morphological classifications ===
The many possible classifications of aquatic plants are based upon morphology. One example has six groups as follows:

- Amphiphytes: plants that are adapted to live either submerged or on land
- Elodeids: stem plants that complete their entire lifecycle submerged, or with only their flowers above the waterline
- Isoetids: rosette plants that complete their entire lifecycle submerged
- Helophytes: plants rooted in the bottom, but with leaves above the waterline
- Nymphaeids: plants rooted in the bottom, but with leaves floating on the water surface
- Neuston: vascular plants that float freely in the water

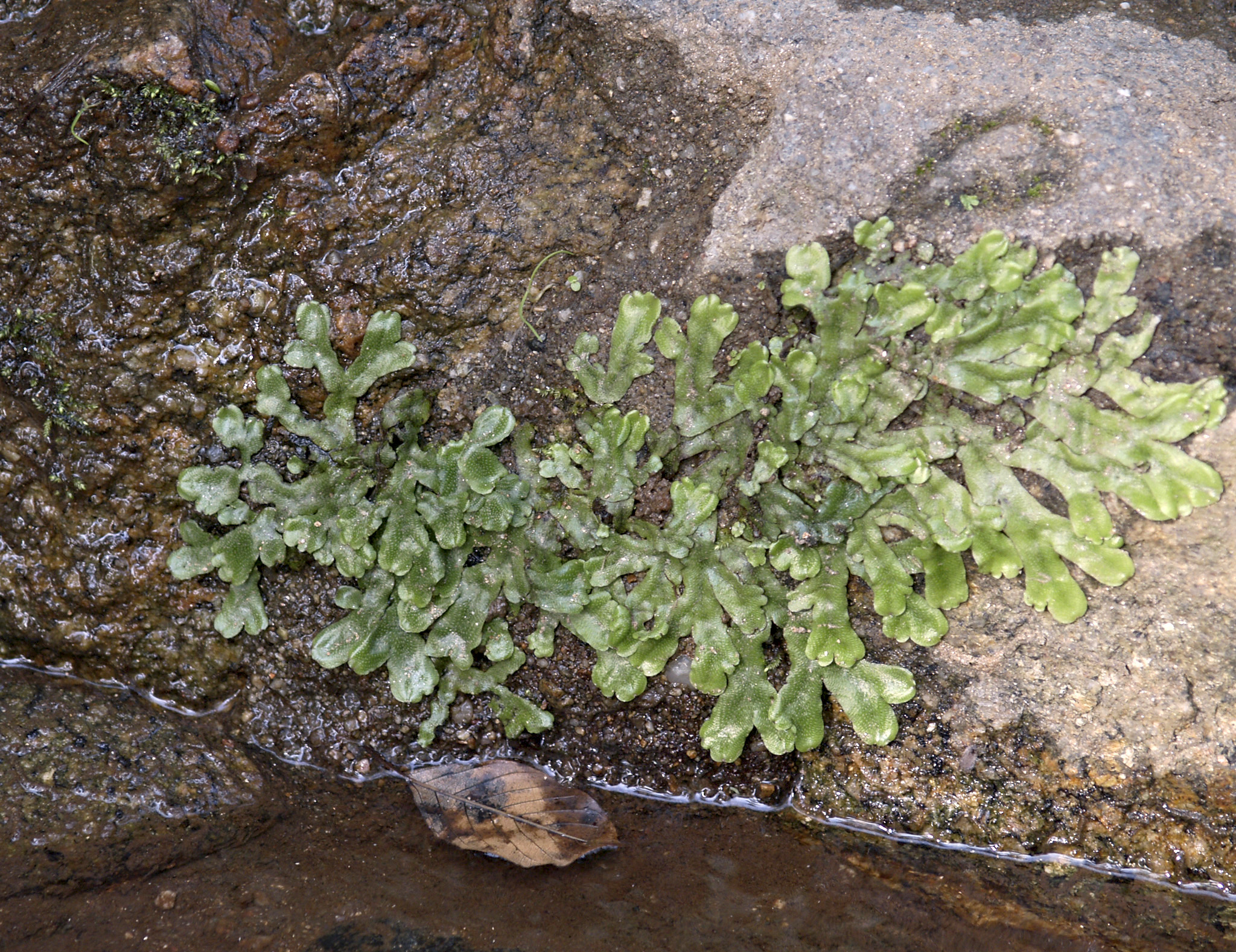
Many liverworts grow either submerged or on land.

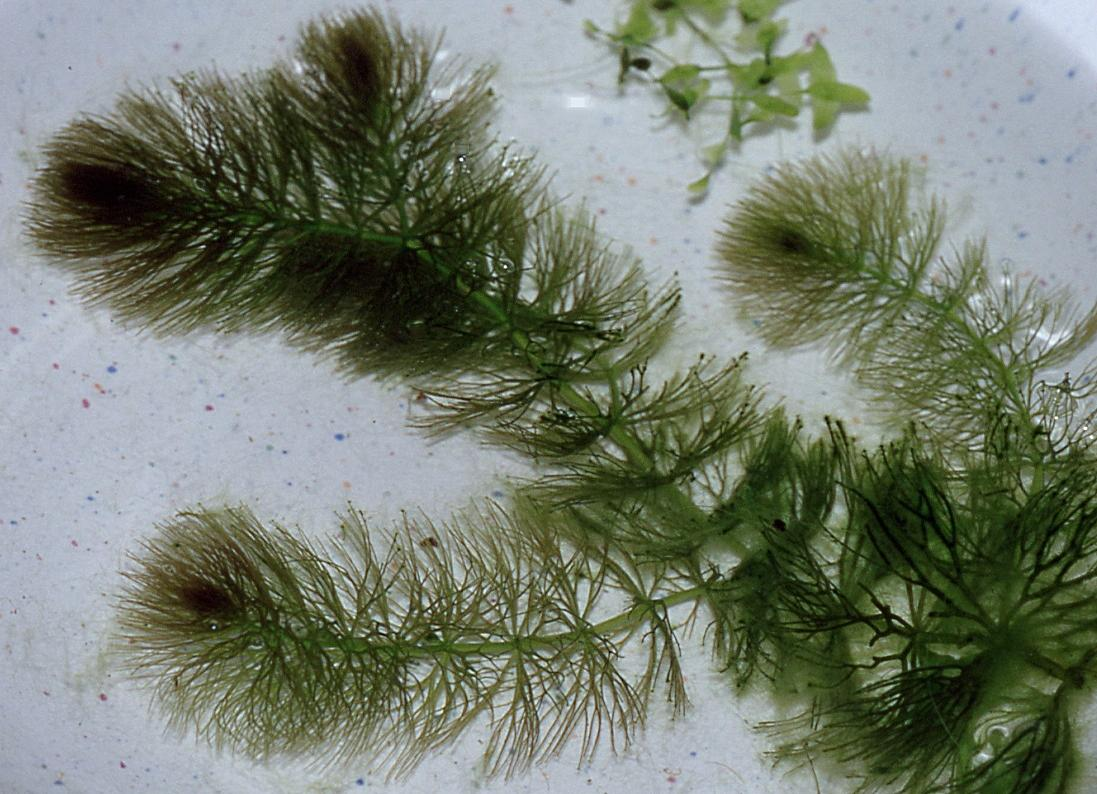
Ceratophyllum submersum, a free-floating plant that grows completely submerged

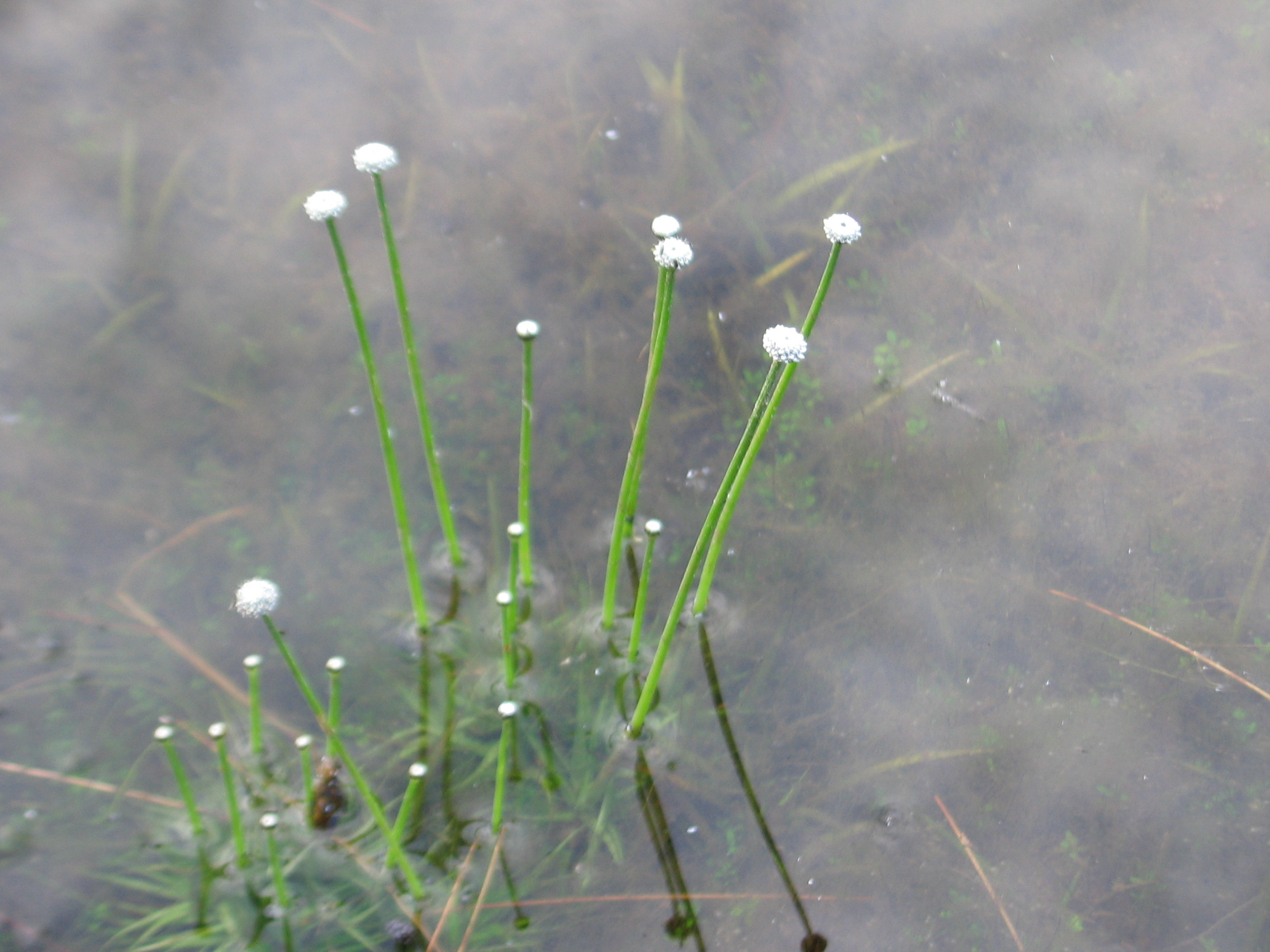
Eriocaulon aquaticum, an isoetid example, grows submerged in water.

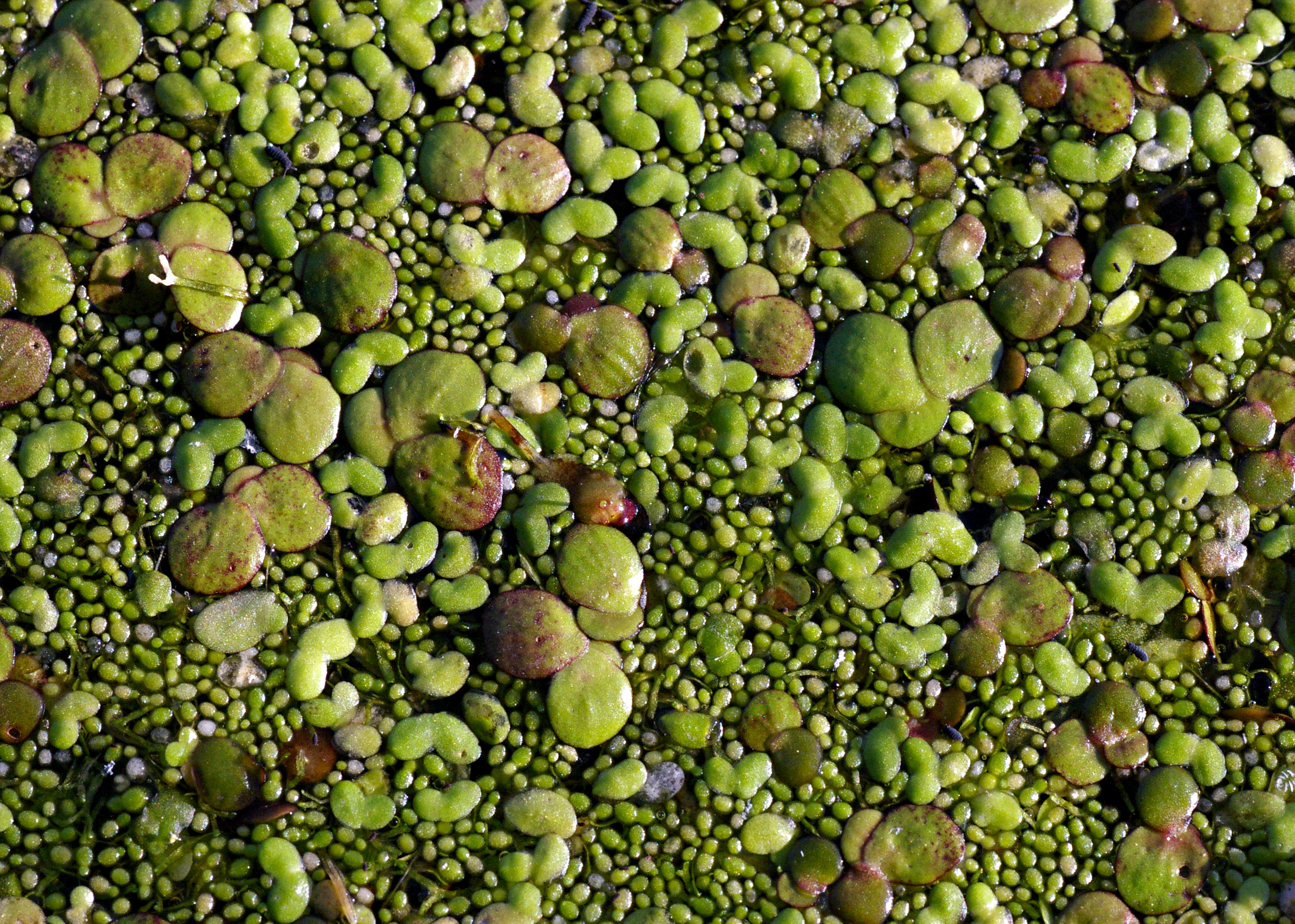
Duckweeds (by size): greater duckweed, common duckweed and rootless duckweed

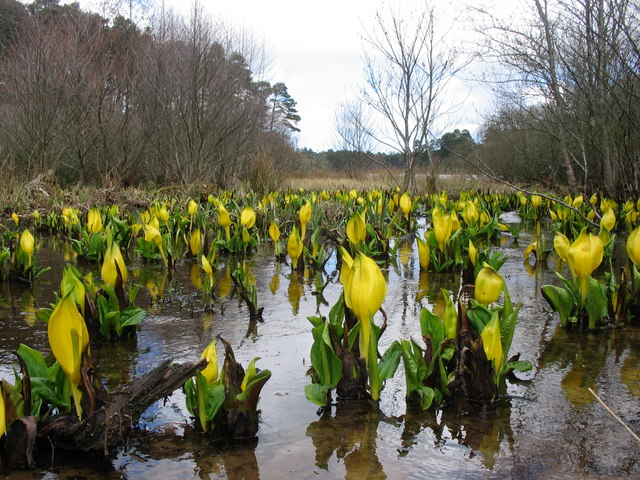
Lysichiton americanus grows rooted in the bottom with leaves and flowers above the waterline.

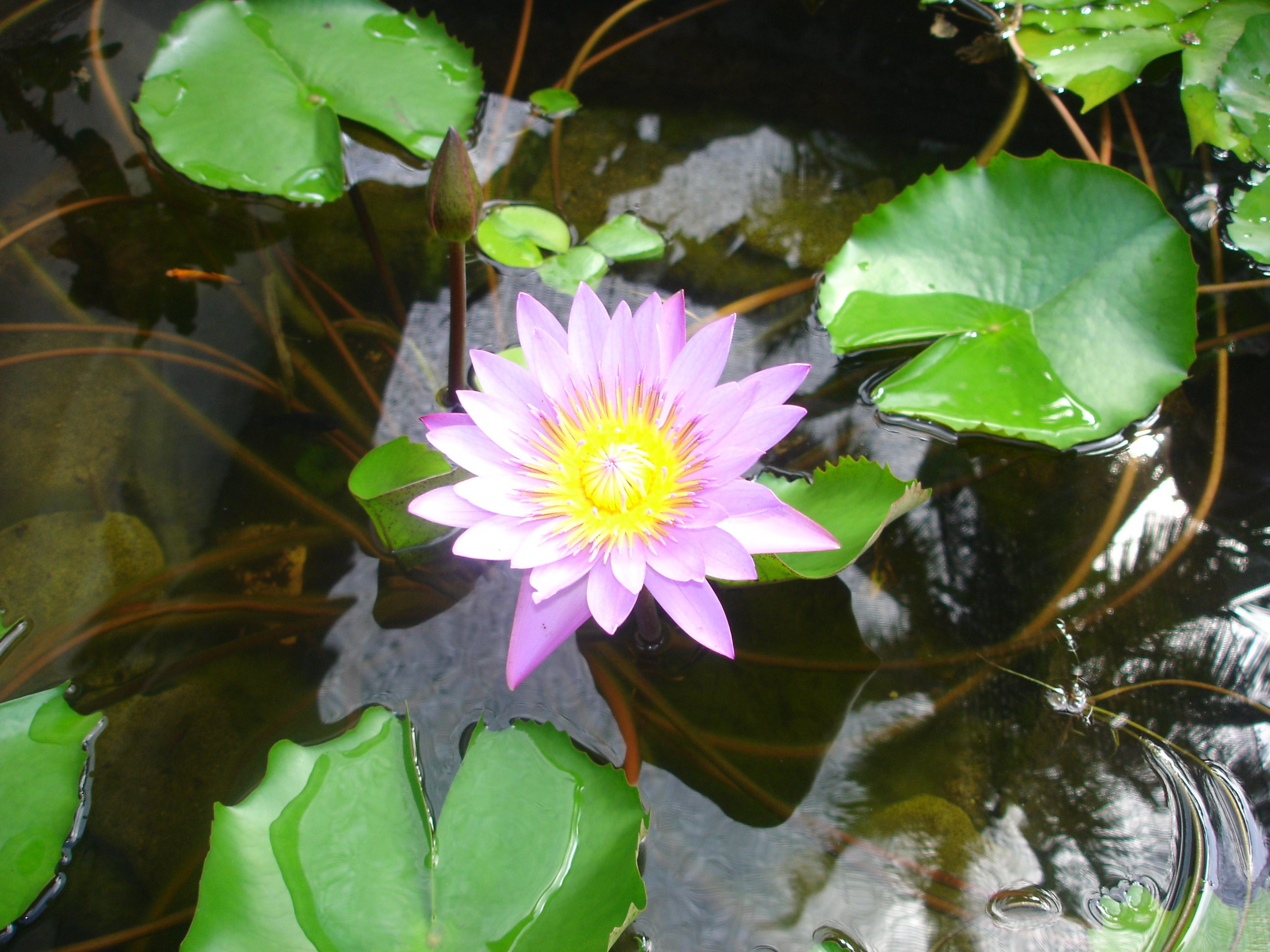
Water lilies grow rooted in the bottom with leaves that float on the water surface.

Pistia stratiotes, an example of a neuston, a plant that floats freely on the water surface

== Aquatic adaptations ==
=== Terrestrial plants in aquatic environments ===
Terrestrial plants may undergo physiological changes when submerged due to flooding. When submerged, new leaf growth has been found to have thinner leaves and thinner cell walls than the leaves on the plant that grew while above water, along with oxygen levels being higher in the portion of the plant grown underwater versus the sections that grew in their terrestrial environment. This is considered a form of phenotypic plasticity as the plant, once submerged, experiences changes in morphology better suited to their new aquatic environment. However, while some terrestrial plants may be able to adapt in the short-term to an aquatic habitat, it may not be possible to reproduce underwater, especially if the plant usually relies on terrestrial pollinators.

=== Buoyancy ===
Due to their environment, aquatic plants experience buoyancy which counteracts their weight. Because of this, their cell covering are far more flexible and soft, due to a lack of pressure that terrestrial plants experience. Green algae are also known to have extremely thin cell walls due to their aquatic surroundings, and research has shown that green algae is the closest ancestor to living terrestrial and aquatic plants. Terrestrial plants have rigid cell walls meant for withstanding harsh weather, as well as keeping the plant upright as the plant resists gravity. Gravitropism, along with phototropism and hydrotropism, are traits believed to have evolved during the transition from an aquatic to terrestrial habitat. Terrestrial plants no longer had unlimited access to water and had to evolve to search for nutrients in their new surroundings as well as develop cells with new sensory functions, such as statocytes.

=== Photosynthesis ===
Submerged aquatic plants have more restricted access to carbon as carbon dioxide compared to terrestrial plants. They may also experience reduced light levels. In aquatic plants diffuse boundary layers (DBLs) around submerged leaves and photosynthetic stems vary based on the leaves' thickness, shape and density and are the main factor responsible for the greatly reduced rate of gaseous transport across the leaf/water boundary and therefore greatly inhibit transport of carbon dioxide. To overcome this limitation, many aquatic plants have evolved to metabolise bicarbonate ions as a source of carbon. Environmental variables affect the instantaneous photosynthetic rates of aquatic plants and the photosynthetic enzymes pigments. In water, light intensity rapidly decreases with depth. Respiration is also higher in the dark per the unit volume of the medium they live in.

=== Reproduction ===
Although most aquatic angiosperms can reproduce by flowering and setting seeds, many have also evolved to have extensive asexual reproduction by means of rhizomes, turions, and fragments in general.

== Functions of aquatic plants ==
One of the largest aquatic plants in the world is the Bolivian waterlily, which holds the Guinness World Record of having the largest undivided leaf at 3.2 m (10 ft 6 in) diameter; the smallest is the rootless duckweed, which is only 1 mm (0.039 in) across. Many small animals use aquatic plants such as duckweeds and lily pads for spawning or as protective shelters against predators both from above and below the water surface.

Aquatic plants are important primary producers and are the basis of food web for many aquatic fauna, especially wetland species. They compete with phytoplanktons for excess nutrients such as nitrogen and phosphorus, thus reducing the prevalence of eutrophication and harmful algal blooms, and have a significant effect on riparian soil chemistry as their leaves, stems and roots slow down the water flow, capture sediments and trap pollutants. Excess sediment will settle into the stream bed due to the reduced flow rates, and some aquatic plants also have symbiotic microbes capable of nitrogen fixation and breaking down the pollutants trapped and/or absorbed by the roots. Historically, aquatic plants have been less studied than terrestrial plants, and management of aquatic vegetation has become an increasingly interested field as means to reduce agricultural pollution of water bodies.

=== Functions of macrophytes in aquatic systems ===
Macrophytes perform many ecosystem functions in aquatic ecosystems and provide services to human society. One of the important functions performed by macrophyte is uptake of dissolved nutrients including nitrogen and phosphorus. Macrophytes are widely used in constructed wetlands around the world to remove excess N and P from polluted water. Besides direct nutrient uptake, macrophytes indirectly influence nutrient cycling; especially N cycling through influencing the denitrifying bacterial functional groups that are inhabiting on roots and shoots of macrophytes. Macrophytes promote the sedimentation of suspended solids by reducing the current velocities, impede erosion by stabilising soil surfaces. Macrophytes also provide spatial heterogeneity in otherwise unstructured water column. Habitat complexity provided by macrophytes tends to increase diversity and density of both fish and invertebrates. The additional site-specific macrophytes' value provides wildlife habitat and makes treatment systems of wastewater aesthetically satisfactory.

World aquaculture production of food fish and aquatic plants, 1990–2016

=== Uses and importance to humans ===
- Food crops

Some aquatic plants are used by humans as a food source. Examples include wild rice (Zizania), water caltrop (Trapa natans), Chinese water chestnut (Eleocharis dulcis), Indian lotus (Nelumbo nucifera), water spinach (Ipomoea aquatica), prickly waterlily (Euryale ferox), and watercress (Rorippa nasturtium-aquaticum).

- Bioassessment

A decline in a macrophyte community may indicate water quality problems and changes in the ecological status of the water body. Such problems may be the result of excessive turbidity, herbicides, or salination. Conversely, overly high nutrient levels may create an overabundance of macrophytes, which may in turn interfere with lake processing. Macrophyte levels are easy to sample, do not require laboratory analysis, and are easily used for calculating simple abundance metrics.

- Potential sources of therapeutic agents

Phytochemical and pharmacological researches suggest that freshwater macrophytes, such as Centella asiatica, Nelumbo nucifera, Nasturtium officinale, Ipomoea aquatica and Ludwigia adscendens, are promising sources of anticancer and antioxidative natural products.

Hot water extracts of the stem and root of Ludwigia adscendens, as well as those of the fruit, leaf and stem of Monochoria hastata were found to have lipoxygenase inhibitory activity. Hot water extract prepared from the leaf of Ludwigia adscendens exhibits alpha-glucosidase inhibitory activity more potent than that of acarbose.

- Wastewater treatment

Macrophytes have an essential role in some forms of wastewater treatment, most commonly in small scale sewage treatment using constructed wetlands or in polishing lagoons for larger schemes.

== Distribution ==
The principal factor controlling the distribution of aquatic plants is the availability of water. However, other abiotic factors may also control their distribution including nutrient availability, availability of carbon dioxide and oxygen, water temperature, characteristics of the substrate, water transparency, water movement, and salinity. Some aquatic plants are able to thrive in brackish, saline, and salt water. Also biotic factors like grazing, competition for light, colonization by fungi, and allelopathy are influencing the occurrence of macrophytes.

== Invasive aquatic plants ==
The introduction of non-native aquatic plants has resulted in numerous examples across the world of such plants becoming invasive and frequently dominating the environments into which they have been introduced. Such species include water hyacinth which is invasive in many tropical and sub-tropical locations including much of the southern US, many Asian countries and Australia. New Zealand stonecrop is a highly invasive plant in temperate climates spreading from a marginal plant to encompassing the whole body of many ponds to the almost total exclusion of other plants and wildlife Other notable invasive plant species include floating pennywort, curly leaved pondweed, the fern ally water fern and parrot's feather. Many of these invasive plants have been sold as oxygenating plants for aquaria or decorative plants for garden ponds and have then been disposed of into the environment.

In 2012, a comprehensive overview of alien aquatic plants in 46 European countries found 96 alien aquatic species. The aliens were primarily native to North America, Asia, and South America. The most spread alien plant in Europe was Elodea canadensis (Found in 41 European countries) followed by Azolla filiculoides in 25 countries and Vallisneria spiralis in 22 countries. The countries with the most recorded alien aquatic plant species were France and Italy with 30 species followed by Germany with 27 species, and Belgium and Hungary with 26 species. The European and Mediterranean Plant Protection Organization has published recommendations to European nations advocating the restriction or banning of the trade in invasive alien plants.

== Nutrient pollution and eutrophication ==
Excessive nutrient inputs, particularly nitrogen and phosphorus from agricultural runoff, sewage, and urban development, lead to eutrophication. This process results in algal blooms that reduce water clarity and oxygen levels, adversely affecting aquatic plants. In eutrophic conditions, submerged plant communities often decline, replaced by phytoplankton-dominated systems. This shift reduces habitat complexity and the availability of refuges for invertebrates and fish. Additionally, (micro)organisms decomposing algae consume oxygen, creating hypoxic "dead zones" where aquatic life cannot survive.

== Climate change ==
Climate change exacerbates threats to aquatic plants through rising temperatures, altered precipitation patterns, and increased frequency of extreme weather events.

Warmer temperatures can favor invasive species that outcompete native plants. For example, studies predict that the ranges of invasive species like Egeria densa and Myriophyllum aquaticum may expand significantly by 2070 due to climate change. Additionally, earlier spring warming allows invasive species to establish before native plants, giving them a competitive advantage.

Climate-induced changes also affect water levels and flow regimes, impacting aquatic plant distribution and health. Droughts can reduce water availability, while intense storms can lead to increased runoff and sedimentation, both detrimental to aquatic vegetation.

== Habitat degradation ==
Human activities such as urban development, agriculture, and dam construction lead to habitat degradation, posing significant threats to aquatic plants.

Urbanization increases impervious surfaces, leading to higher runoff volumes that carry pollutants and sediments into water bodies. This runoff can smother aquatic plants and alter water chemistry. Agricultural practices contribute to nutrient loading and pesticide contamination, further stressing aquatic vegetation.

Dam construction and water diversion projects alter natural flow regimes, affecting sediment transport and water temperature. These changes can disrupt the life cycles of aquatic plants and the species that depend on them.

Aquatic plants are integral to healthy aquatic ecosystems, but they face numerous threats from invasive species, nutrient pollution, climate change, and habitat degradation. Addressing these challenges requires integrated management approaches, including controlling invasive species, reducing nutrient inputs, mitigating climate change impacts, and protecting and restoring aquatic habitats.

== Gallery ==
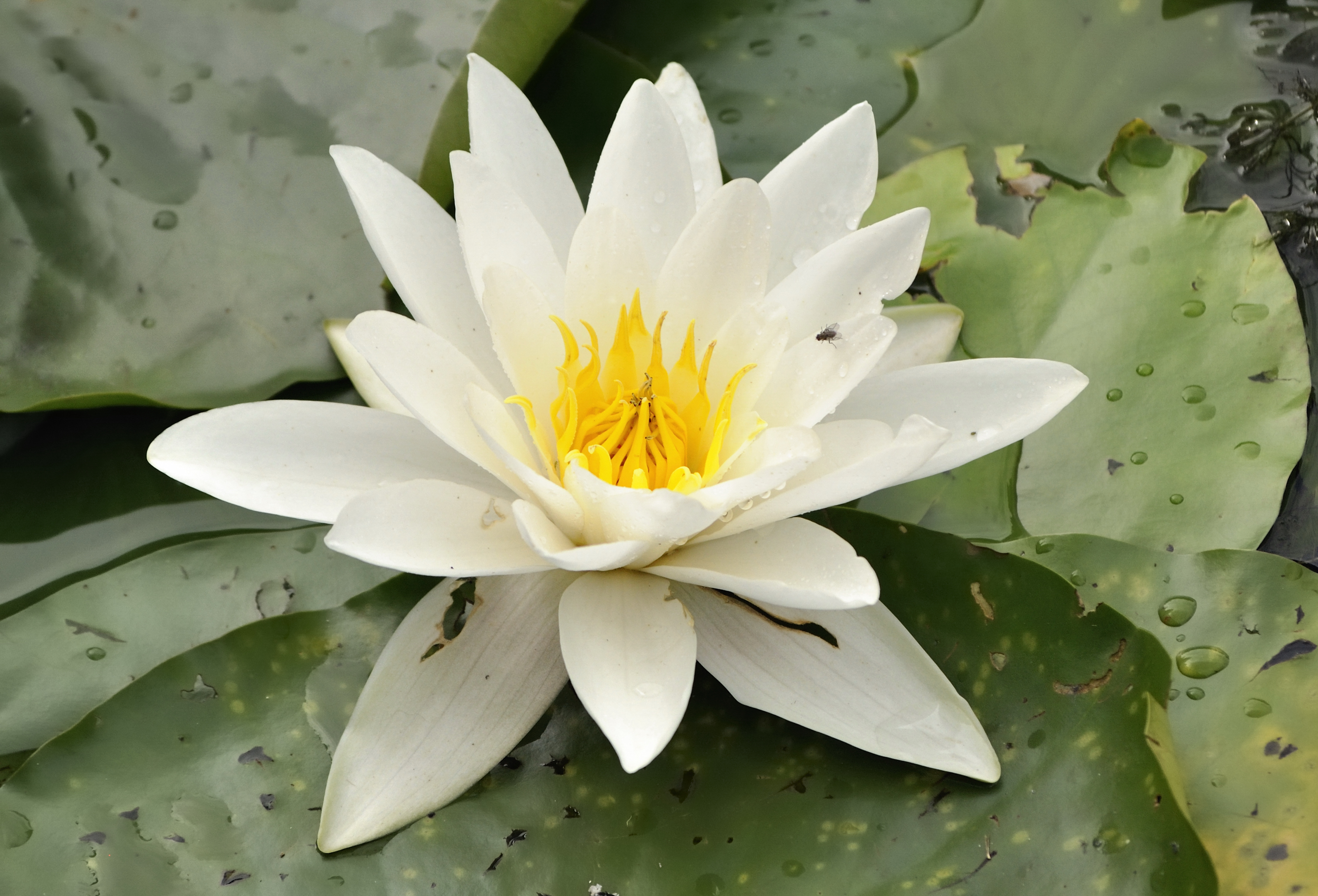
Nymphaea - floating leaved

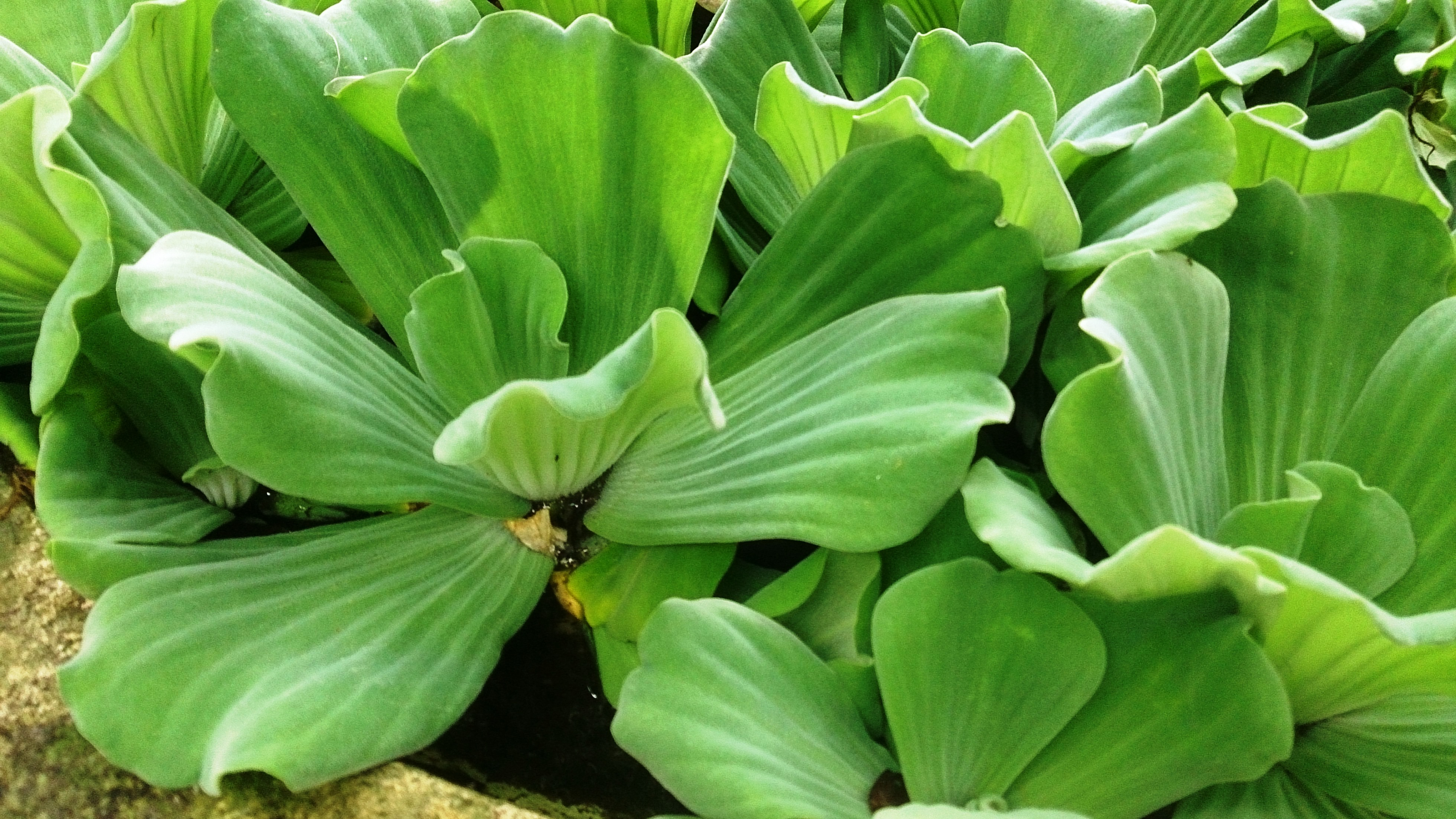
Pistia - free floating

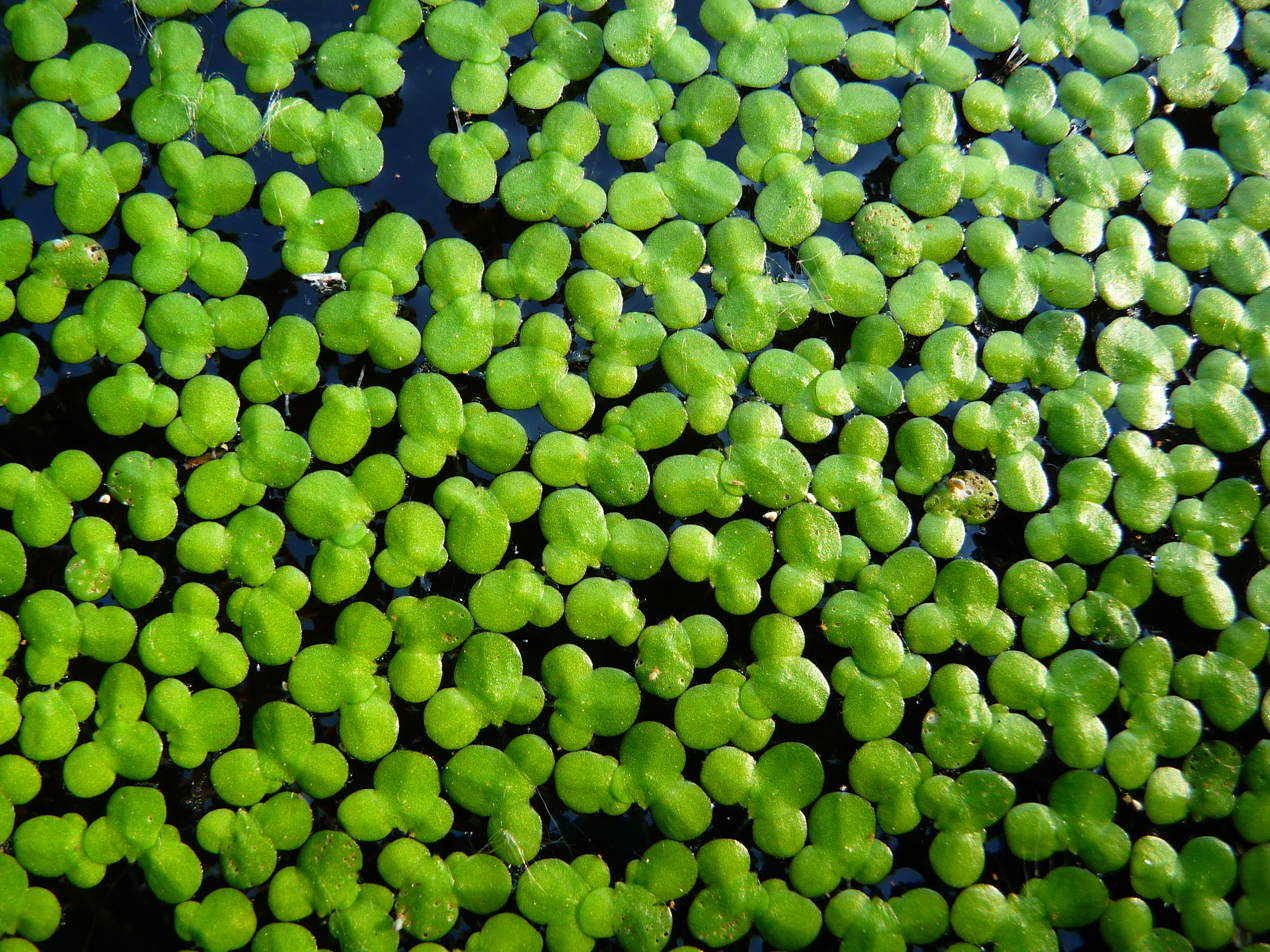
Lemna - free floating

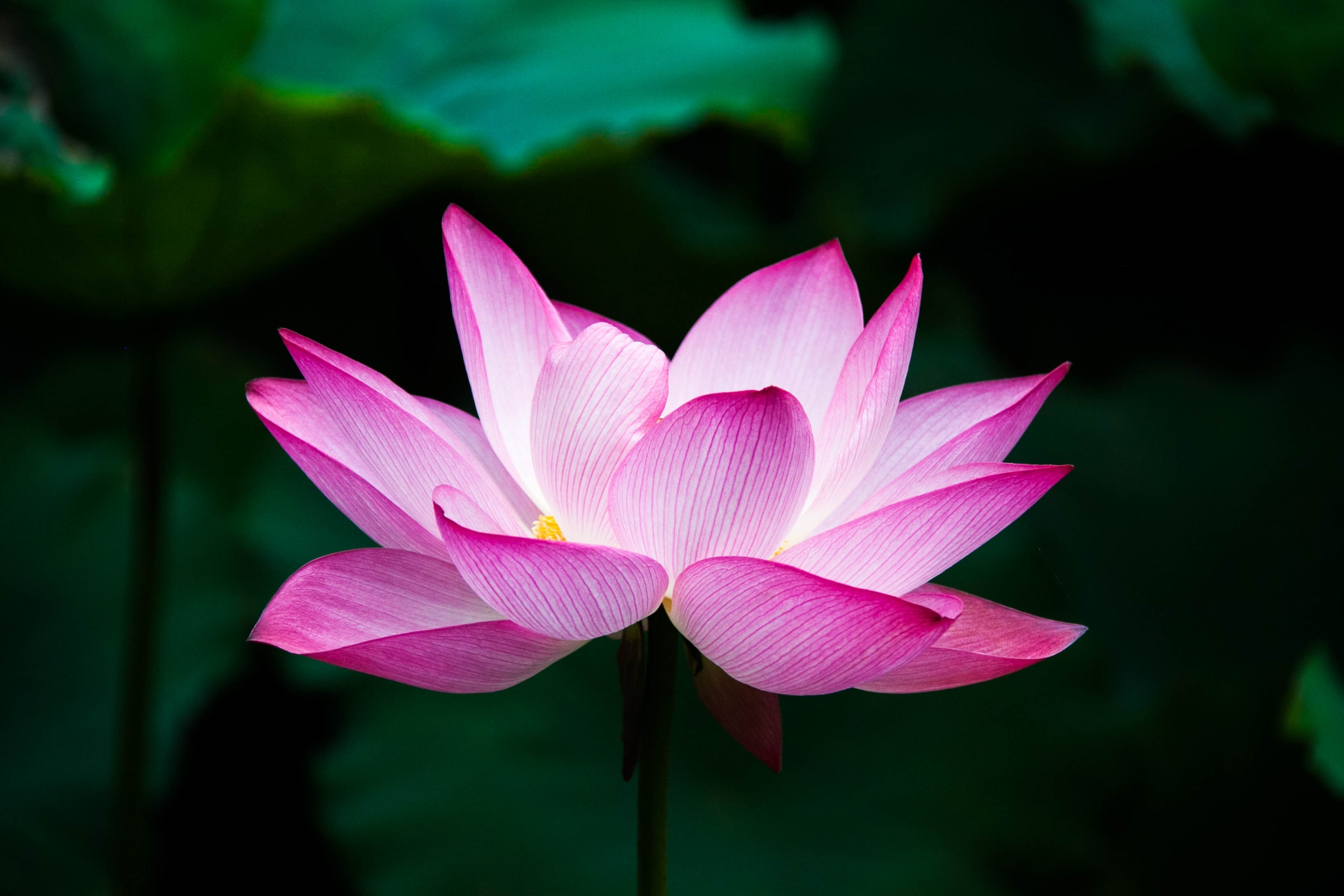
Nelumbo - floating leaved

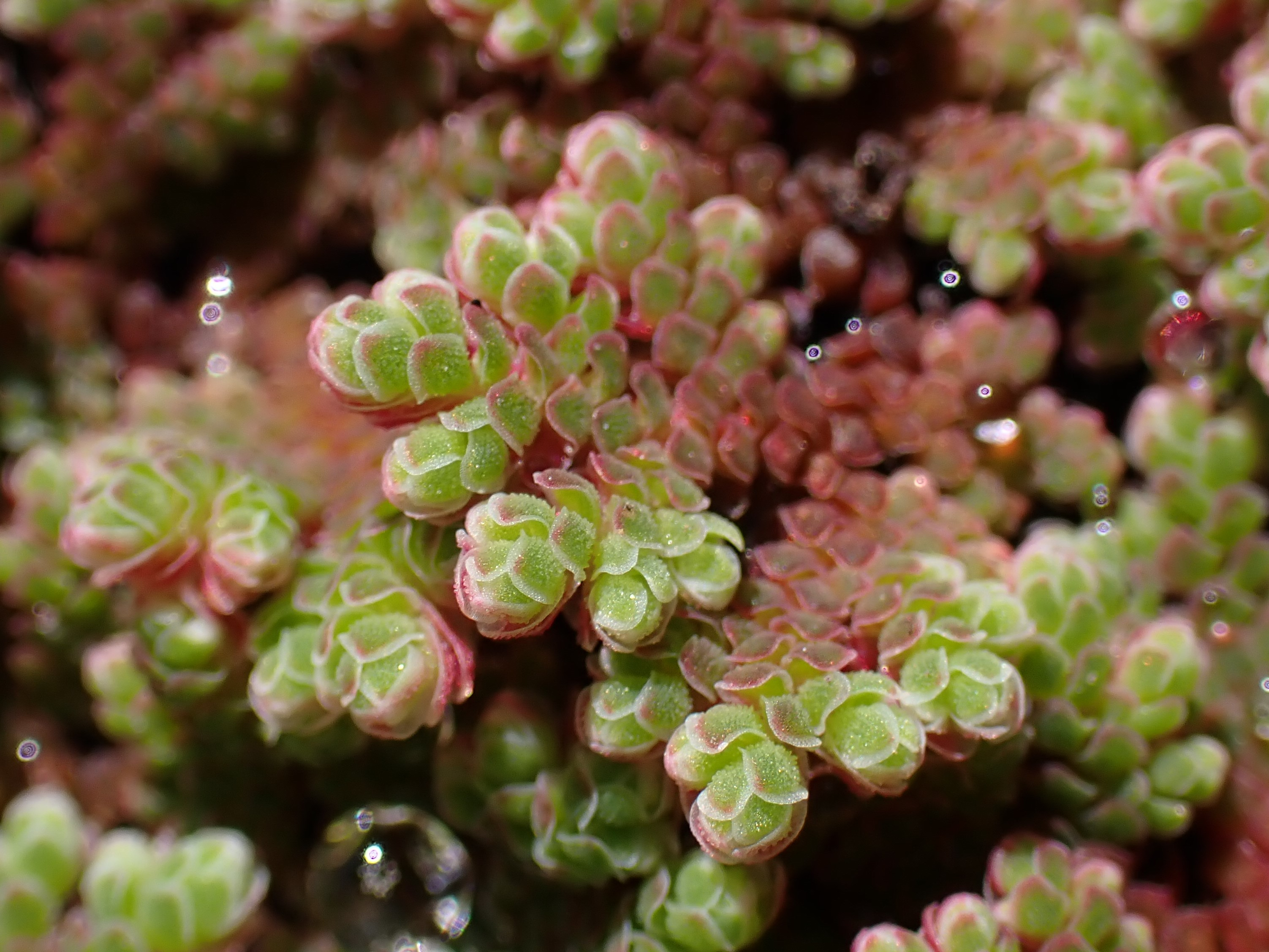
Azolla - free floating

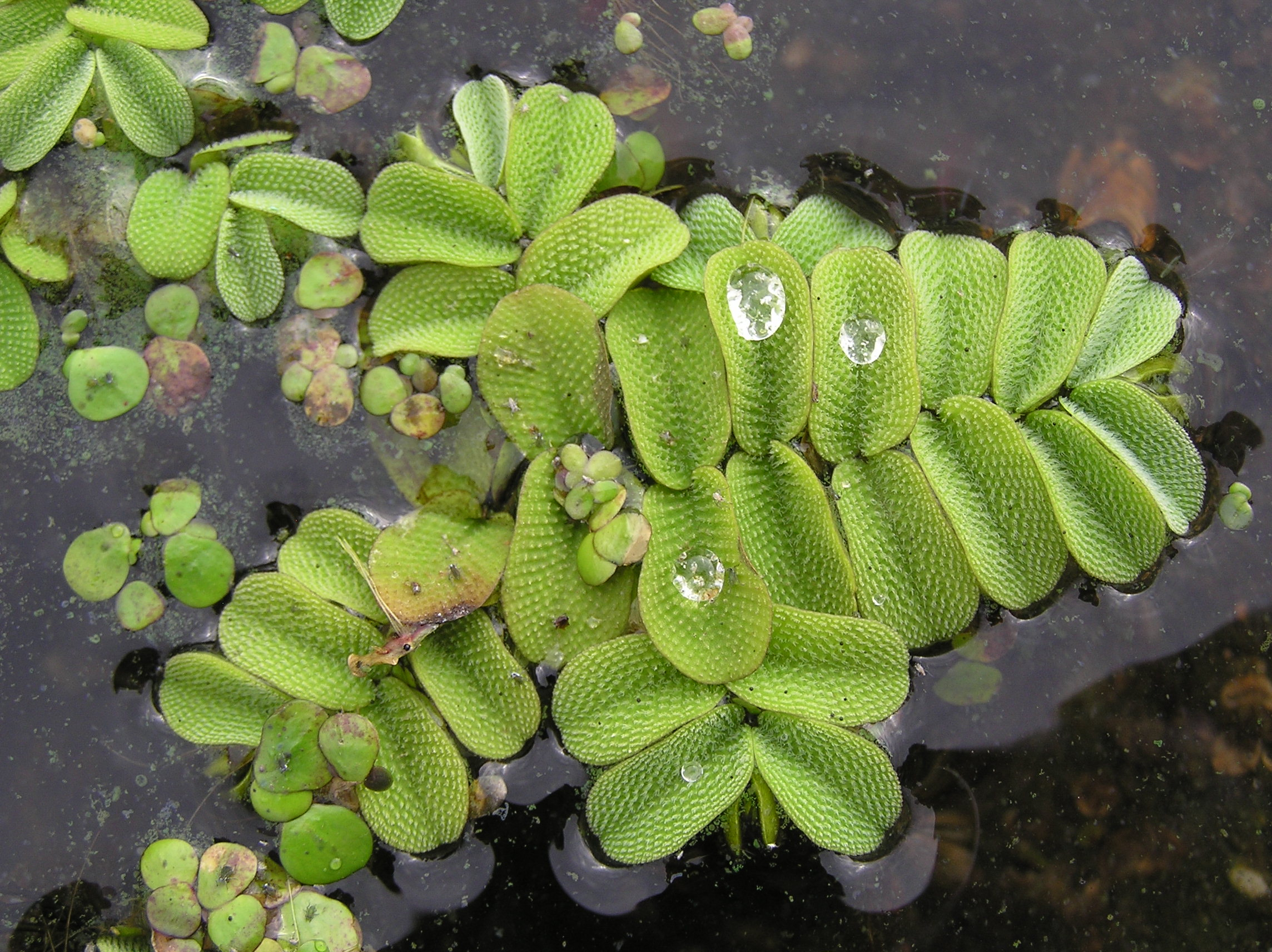
Salvinia - free floating

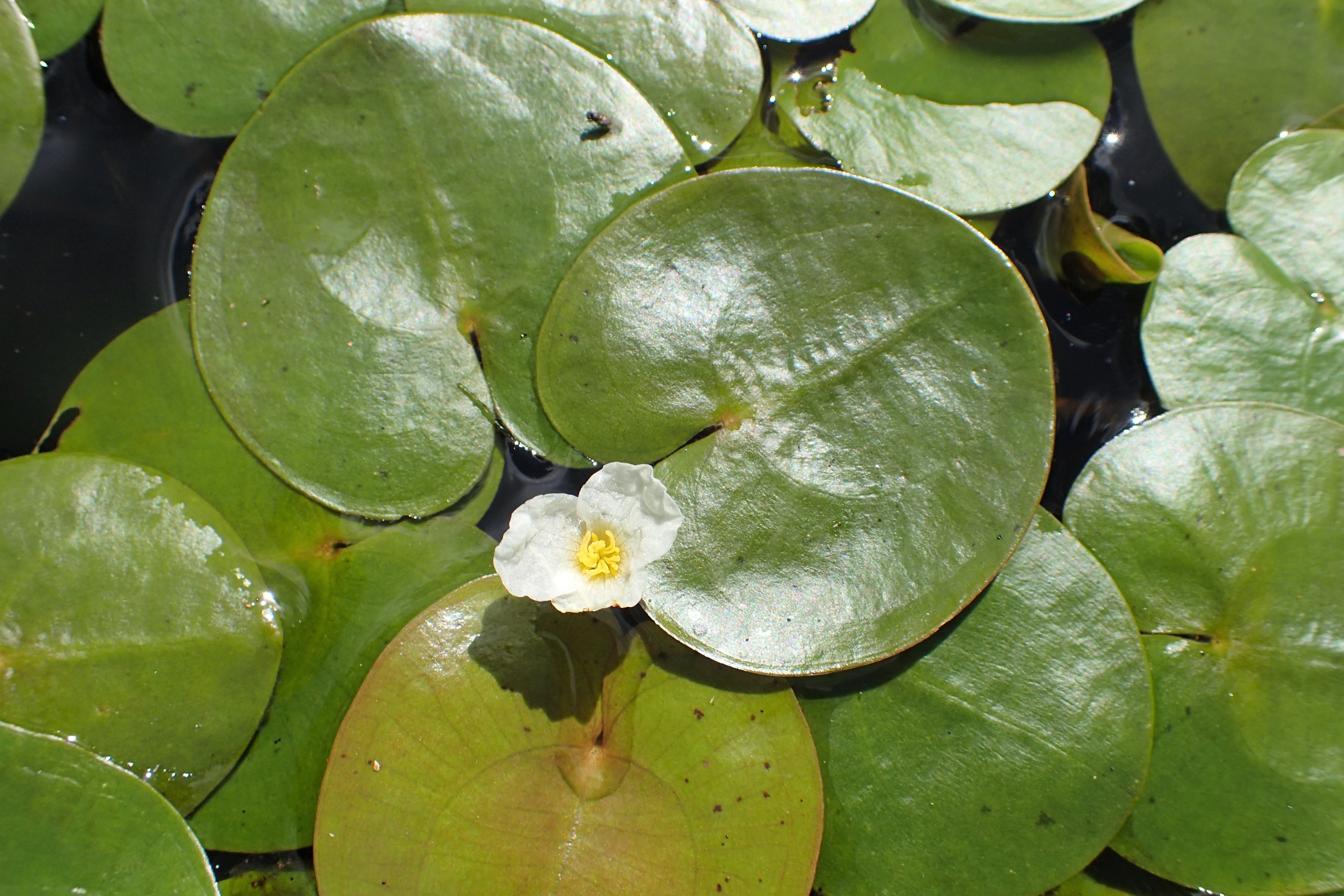
Hydrocharis - free floating

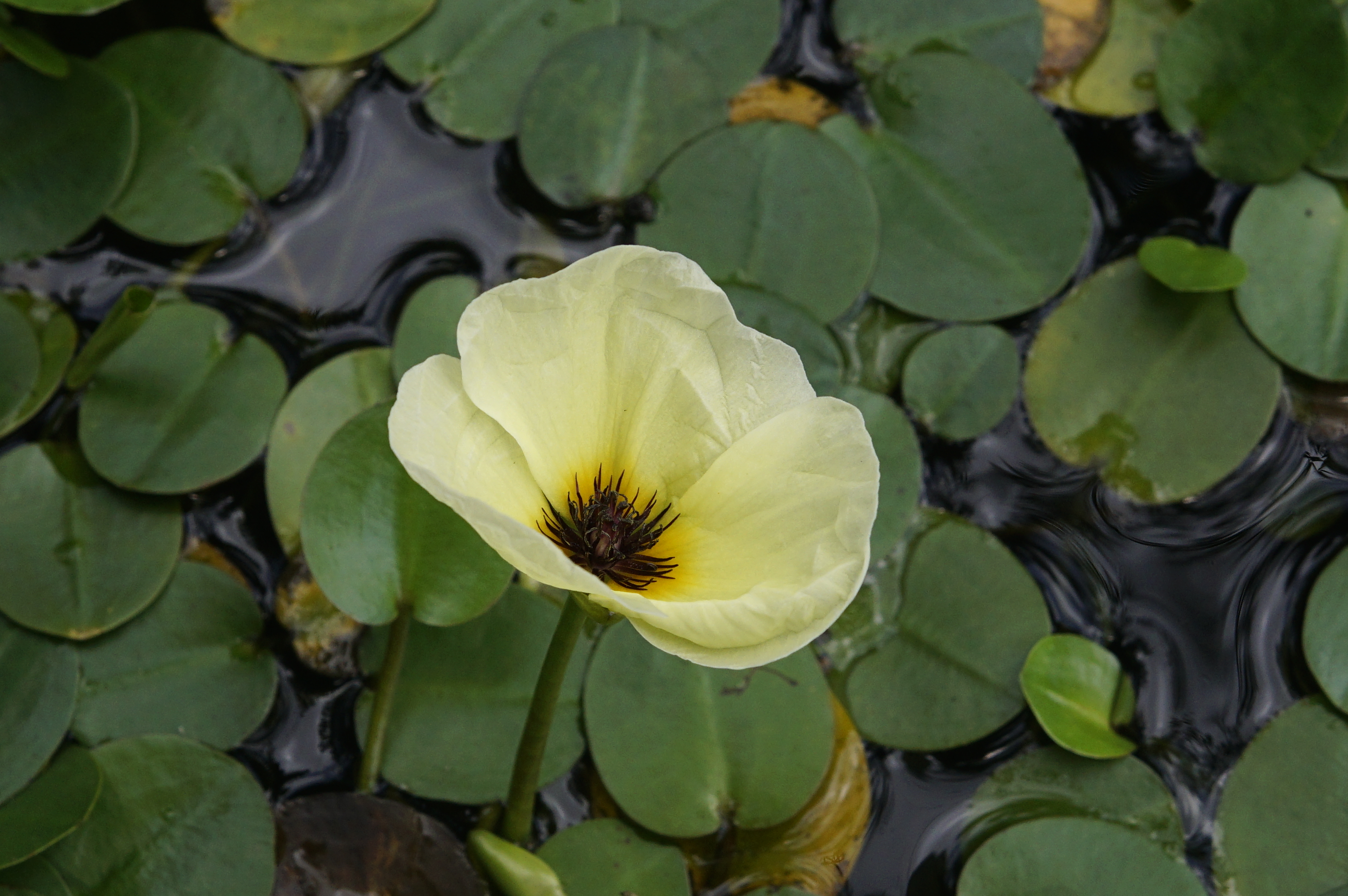
Hydrocleys - floating leaved

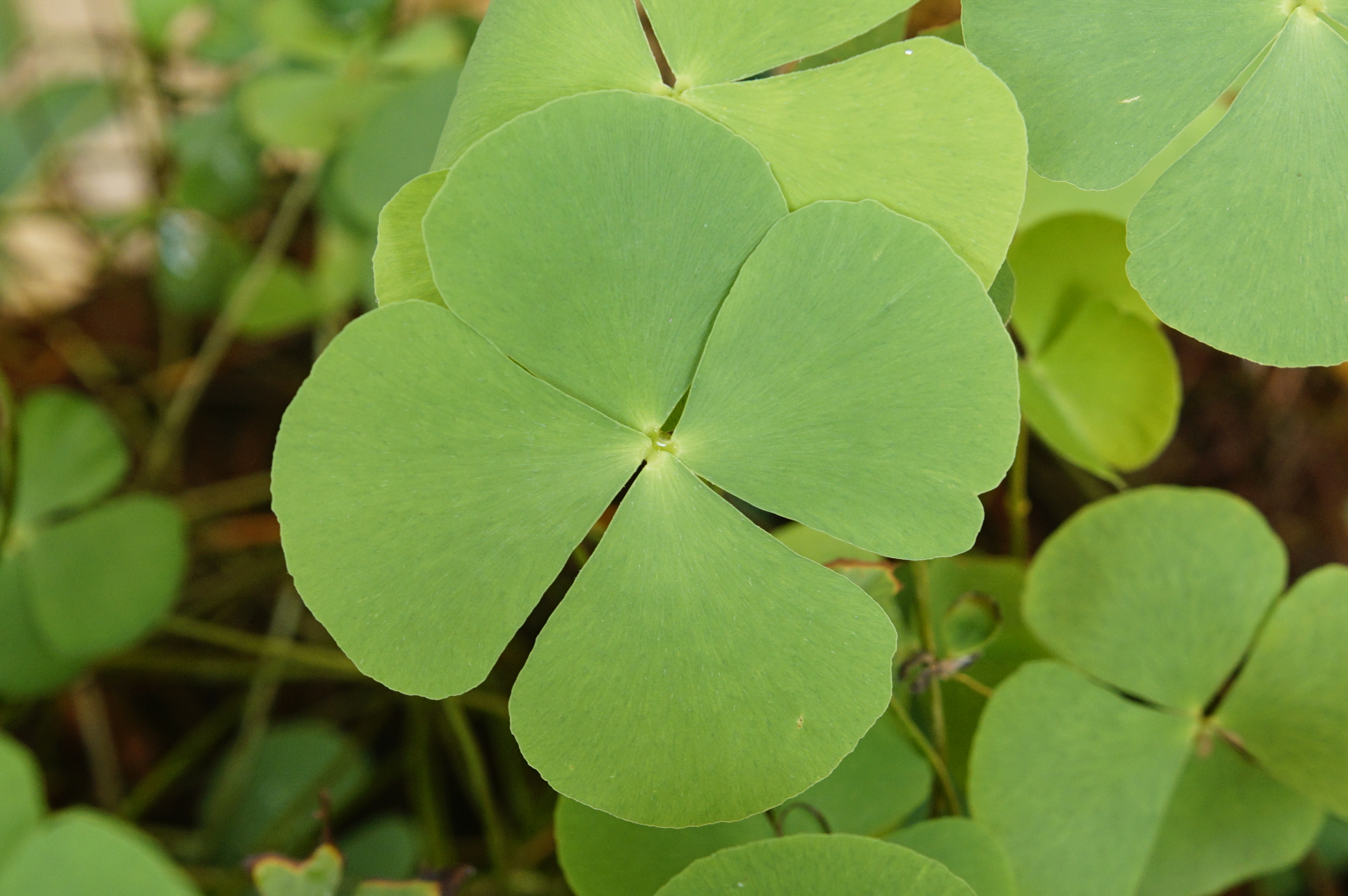
Marsilea - floating leaved

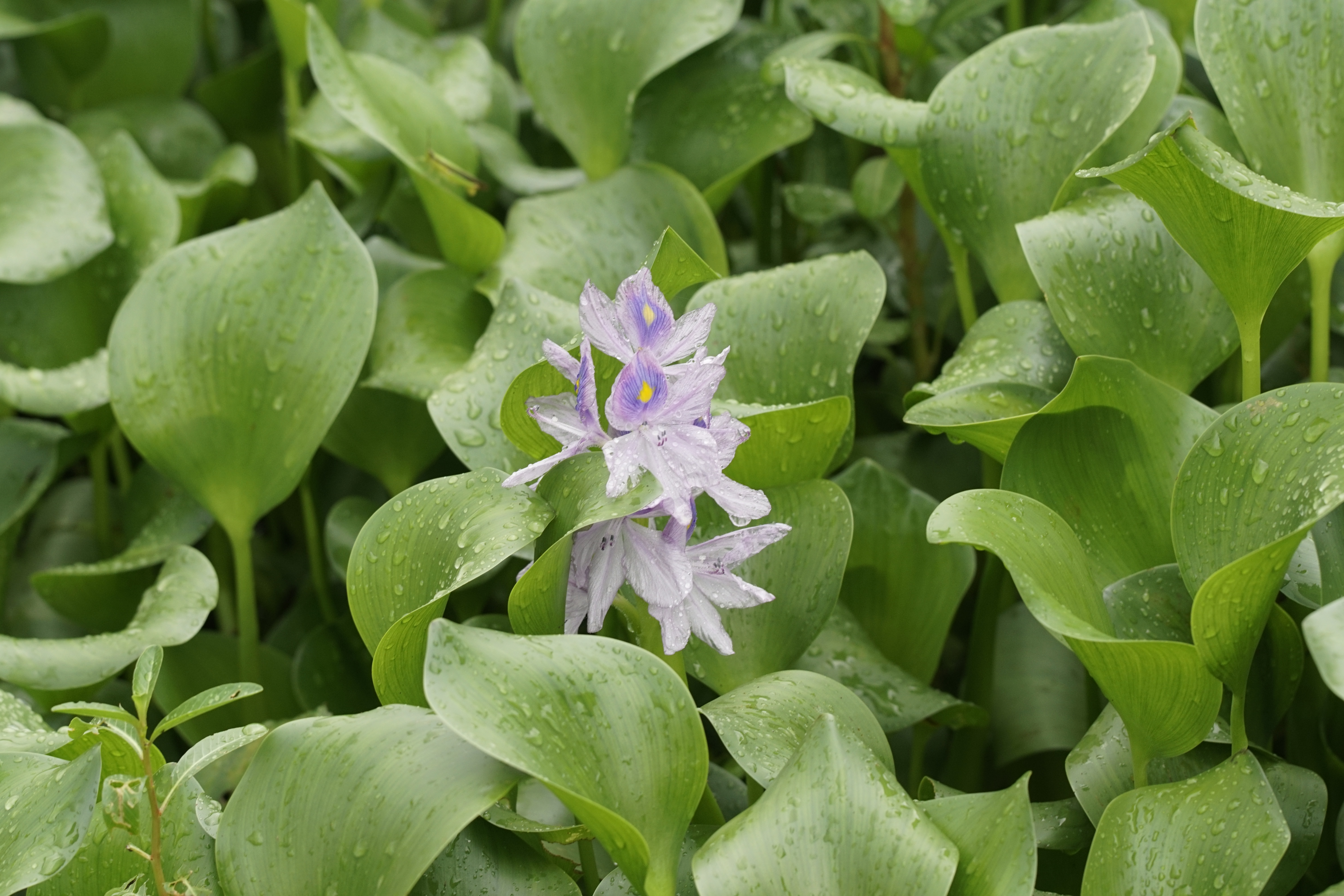
Eichhornia - free floating

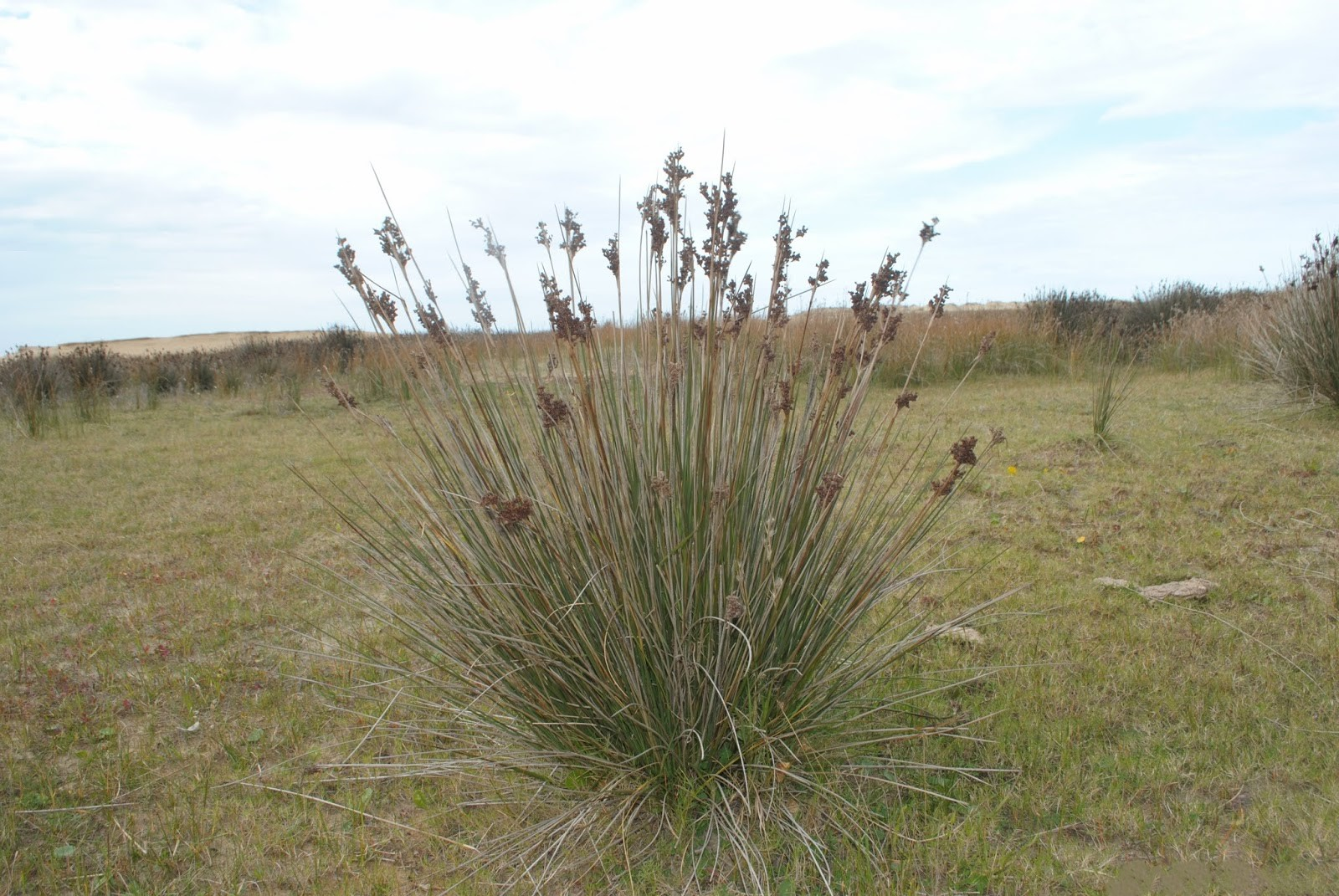
Juncus - emergent

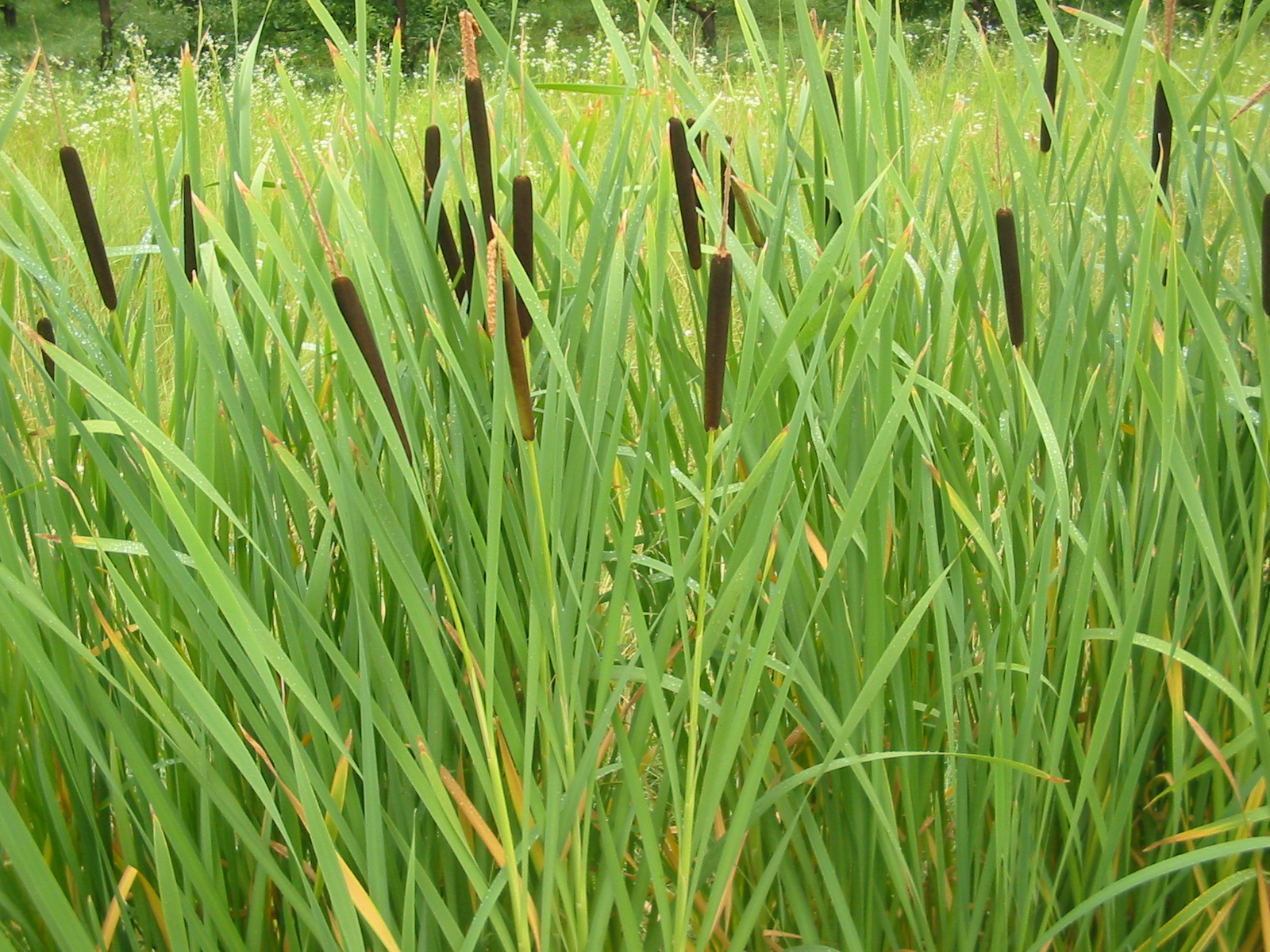
Typha - emergent

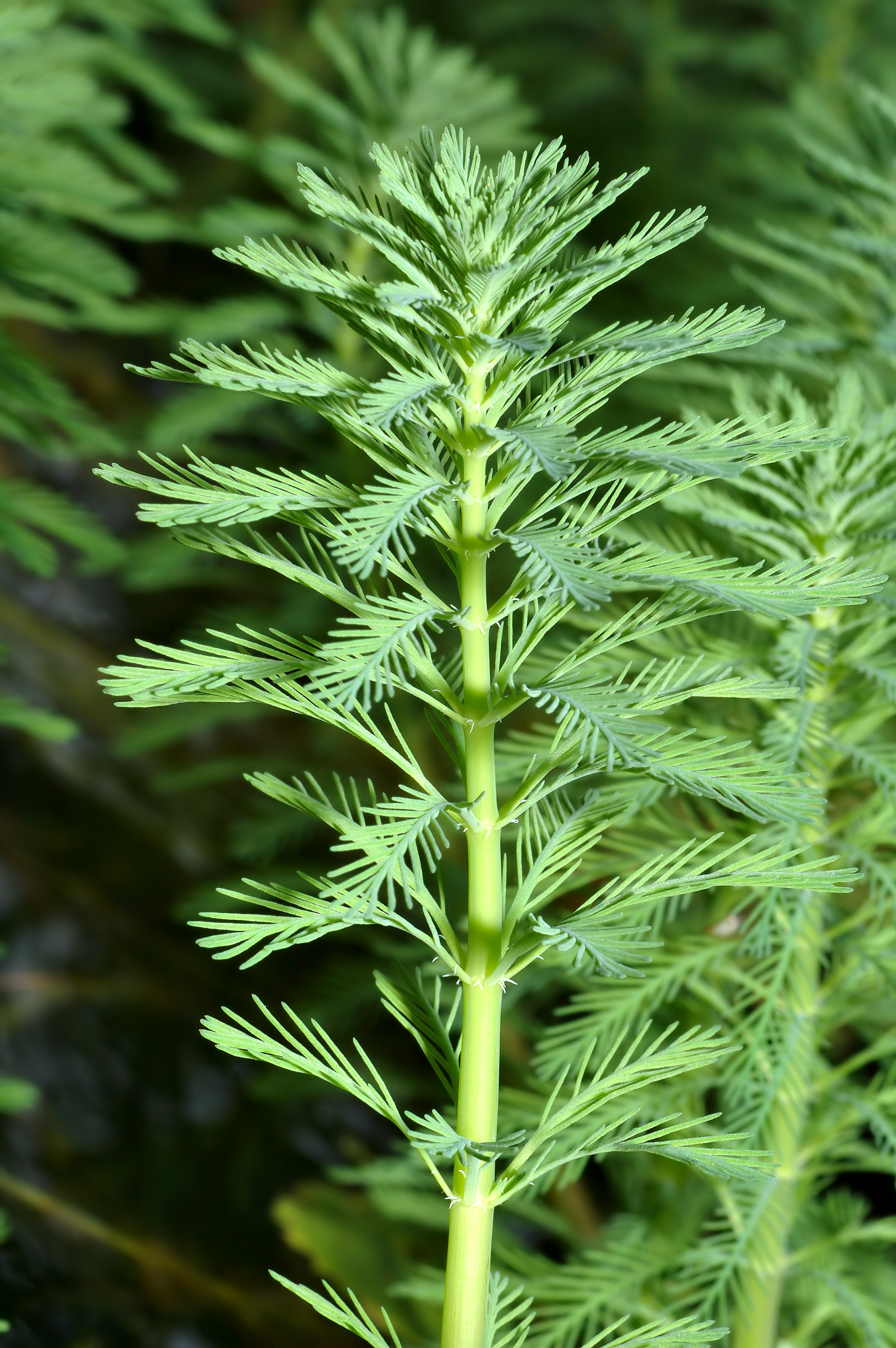
Myriophyllum - floating leaved

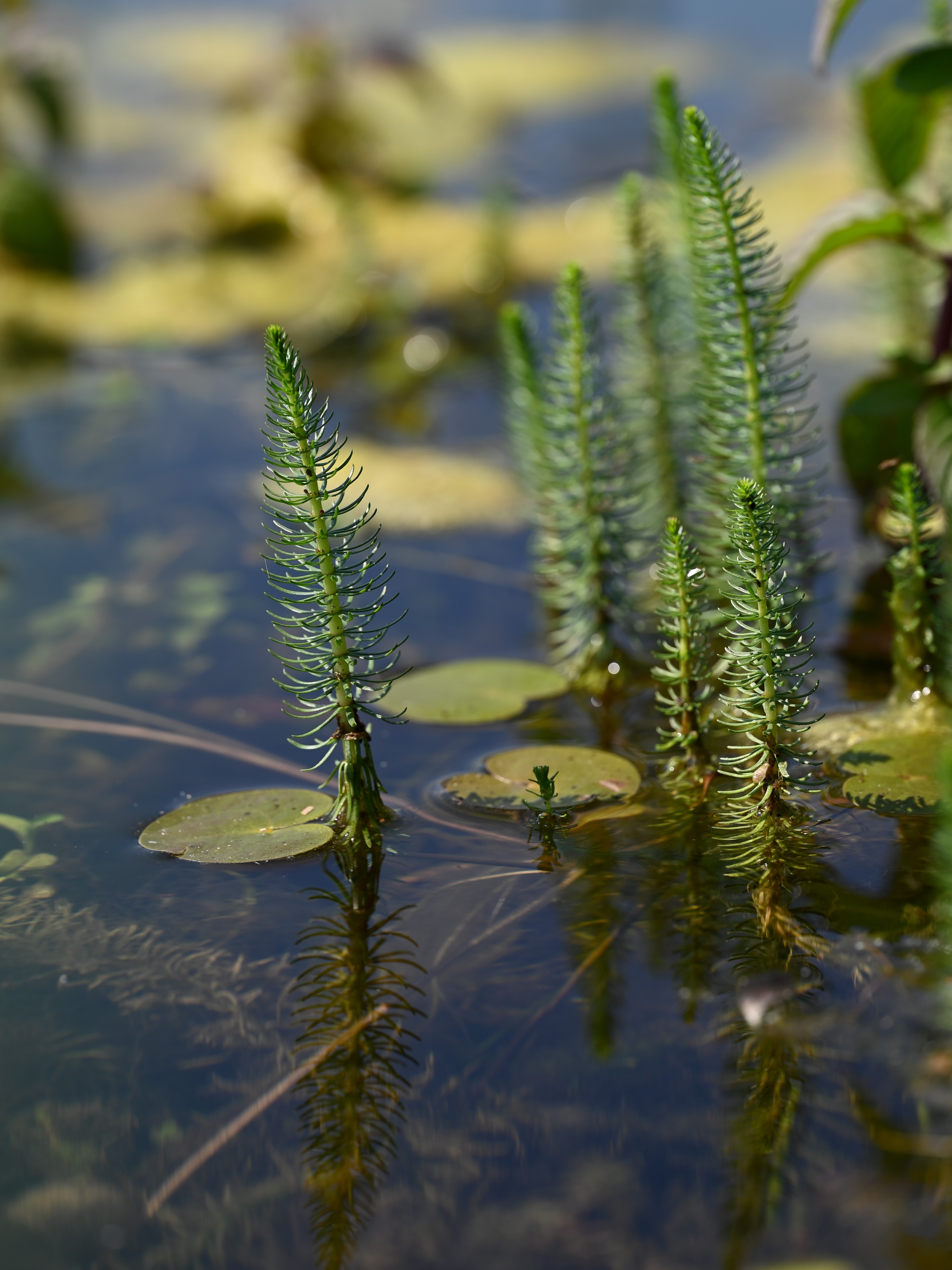
Hippuris - emergent and floating leaved

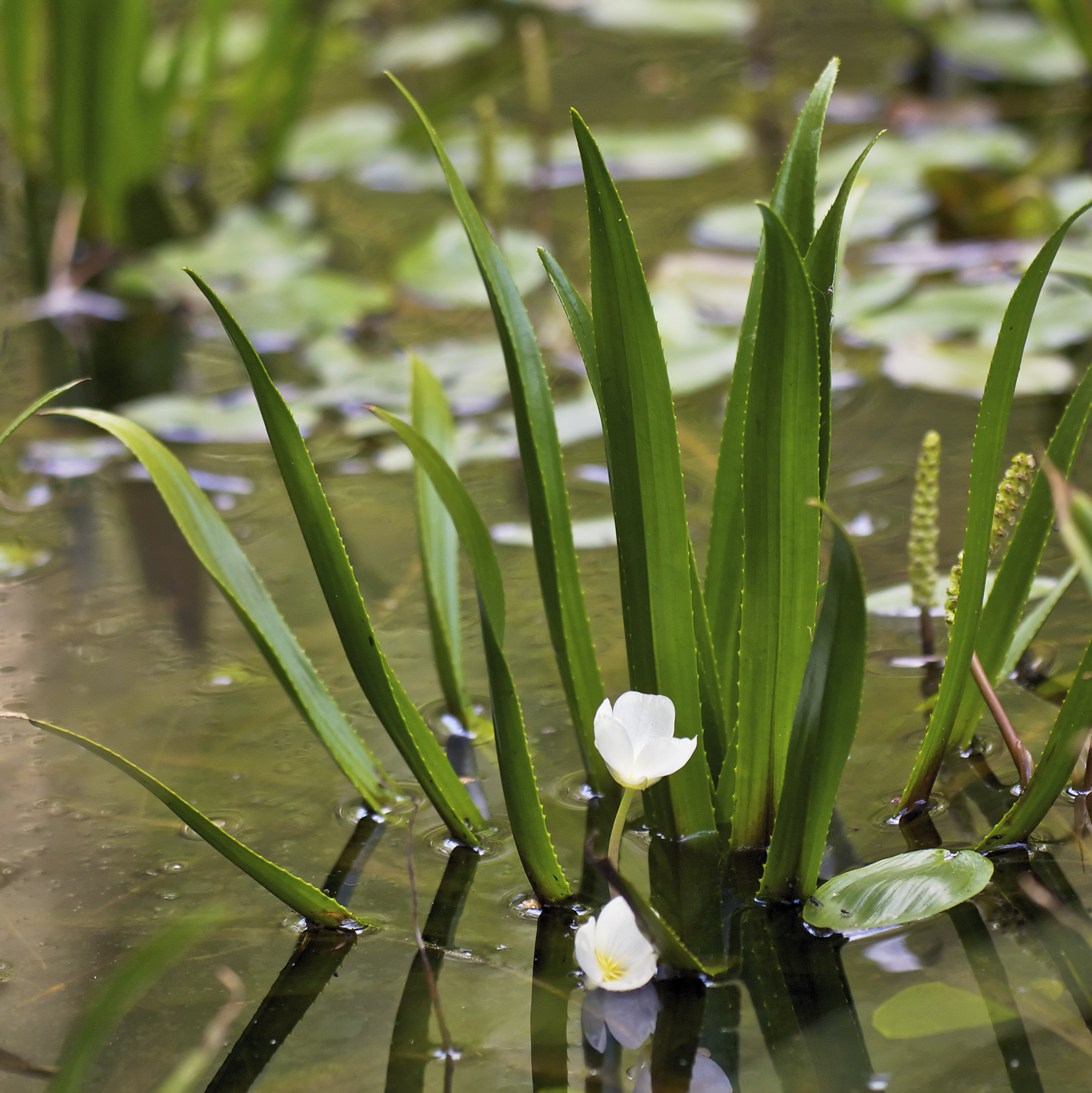
Stratiotes - floating leaved

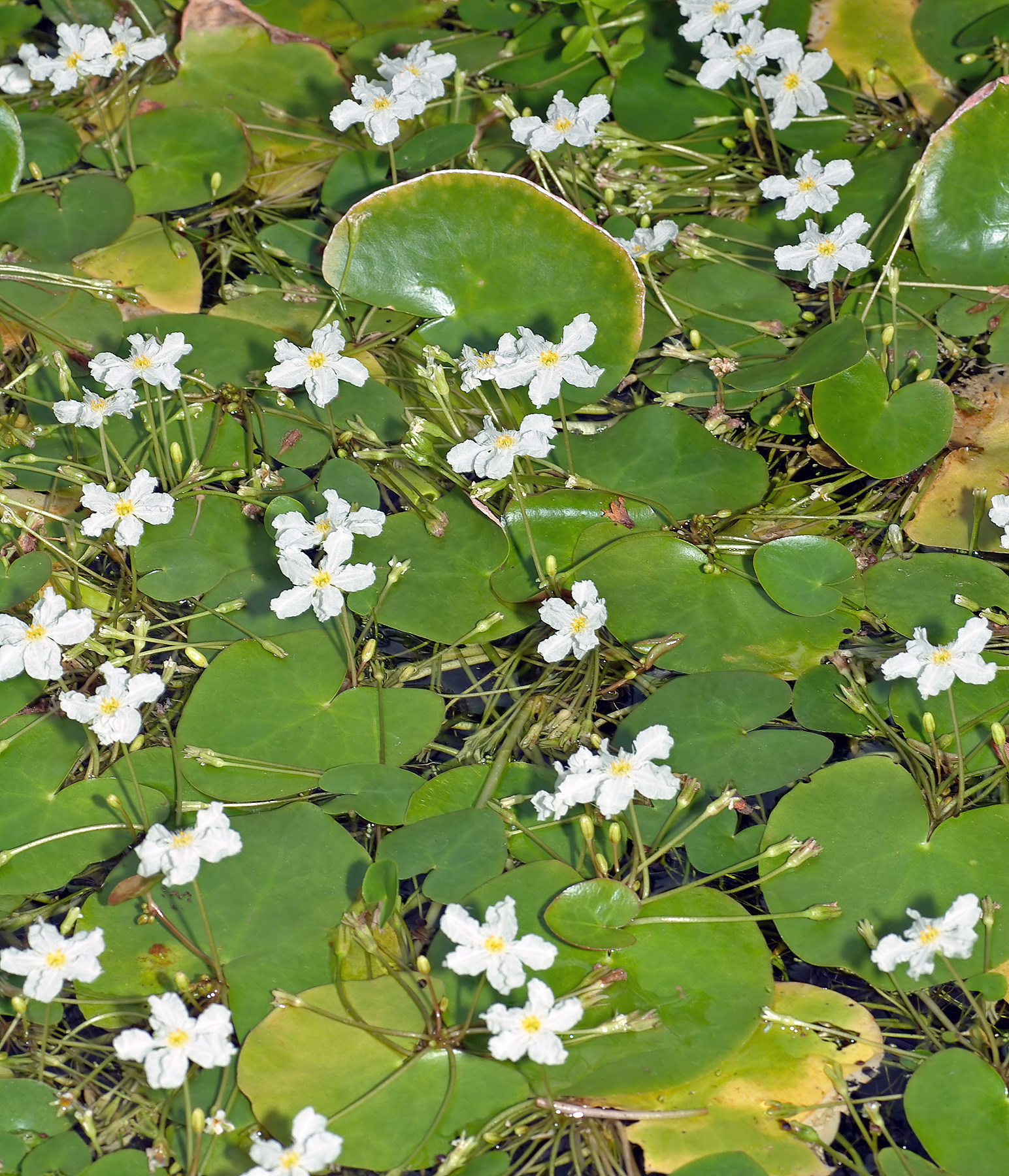
Nymphoides - free floating, submergent, and floating leaved

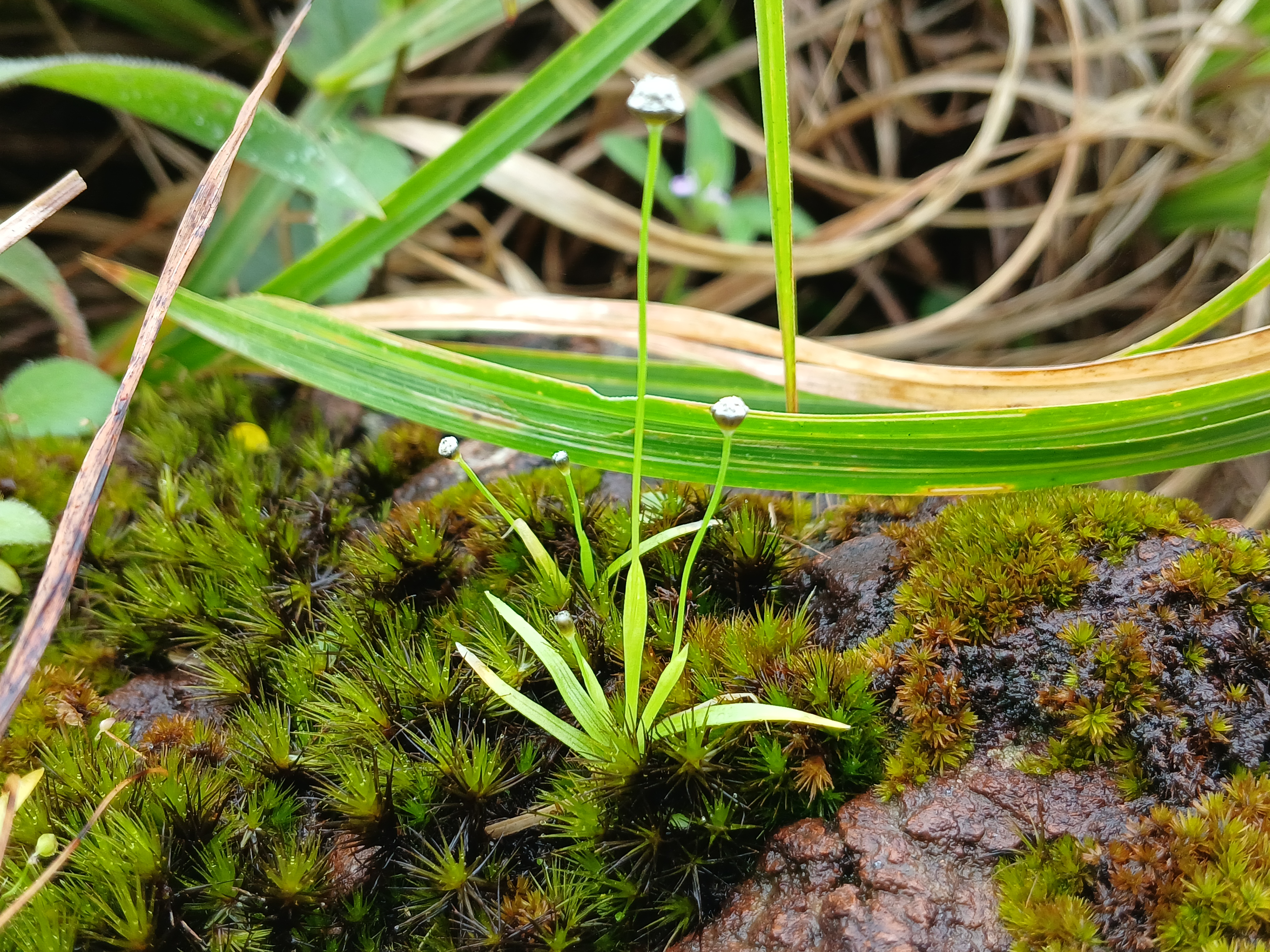
Eriocaulon - emergent

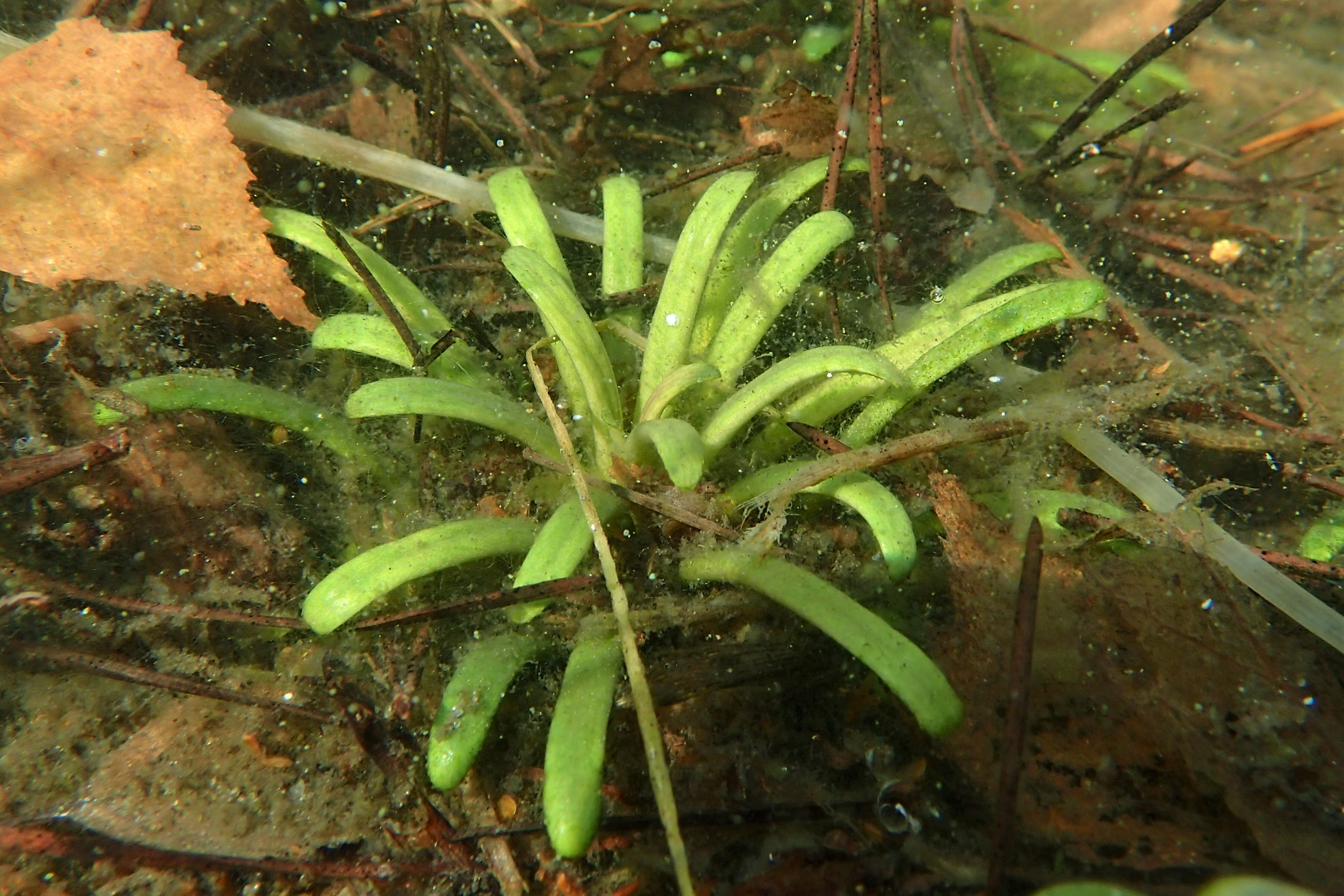
Lobelia - emergent

== See also ==
- Aquatic animal
- Aquatic Botany (journal)
- Aquatic ecosystem
- Aquatic locomotion
- Aquatic mammal
- Botany
- List of freshwater aquarium plant species
- List of wetland plants
- Marine biology
- Plant community
- Raunkiær plant life-form
- Terrestrial animal
- Terrestrial ecosystem
- Terrestrial locomotion
- Terrestrial plant
- Wetland – Ecosystem that is flooded or saturated with water
- Wetland indicator status
