= Isoetid =

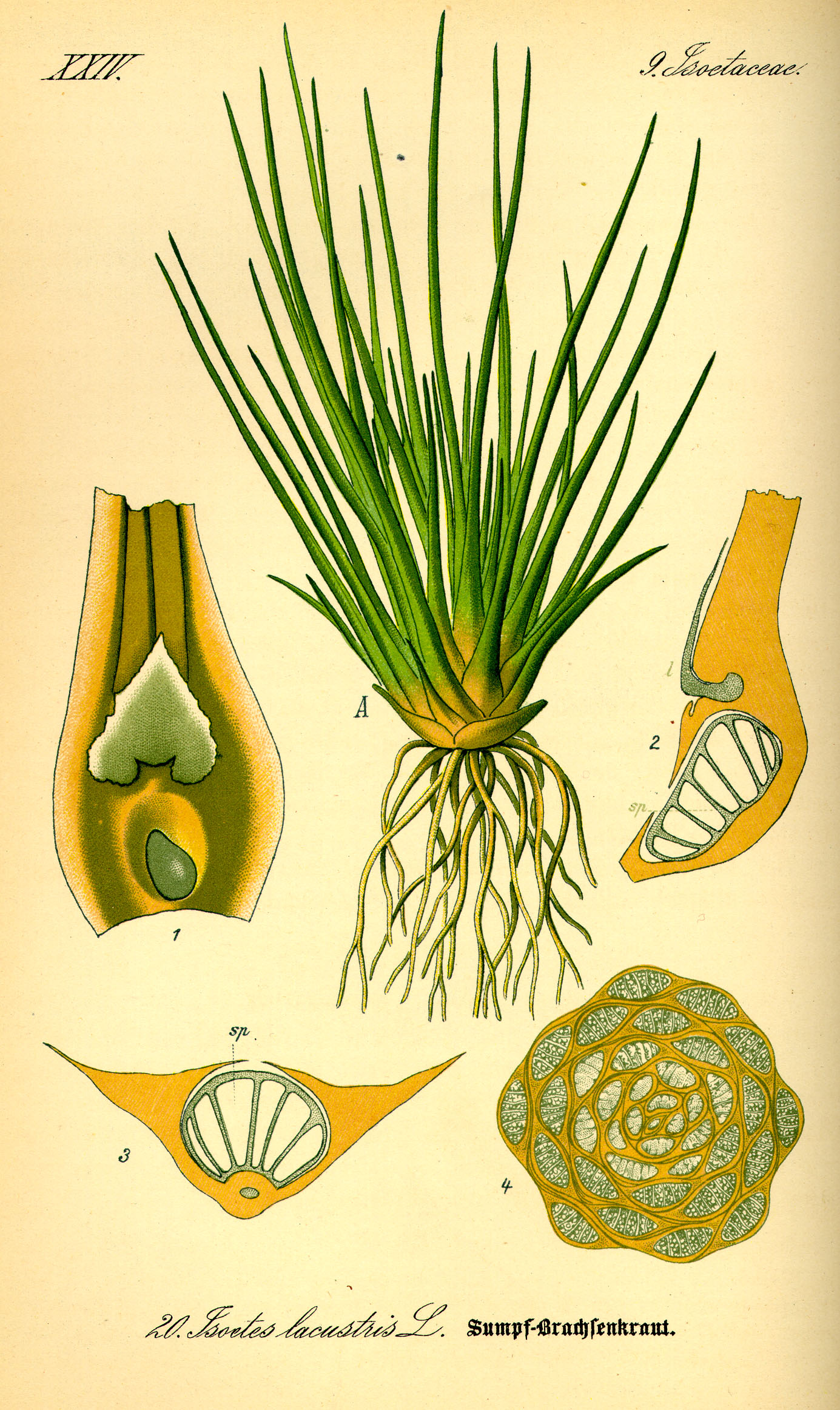
Isoetids are named for their superficial resemblance to, and shared habitat requirements with, the genus Isoetes.

Isoetids are aquatic plants or wetland plants named for their superficial similarity to the quillworts, Isoetes. They occur in wetlands and on shorelines with low nutrient availability. Owing to their slow growth rates, they are also often found in areas with low rates of sediment deposition. Many have evergreen leaves, and CAM photosynthesis. Often they are exposed during periods of low water. Common examples include Lobelia dortmanna and Eriocaulon aquaticum.

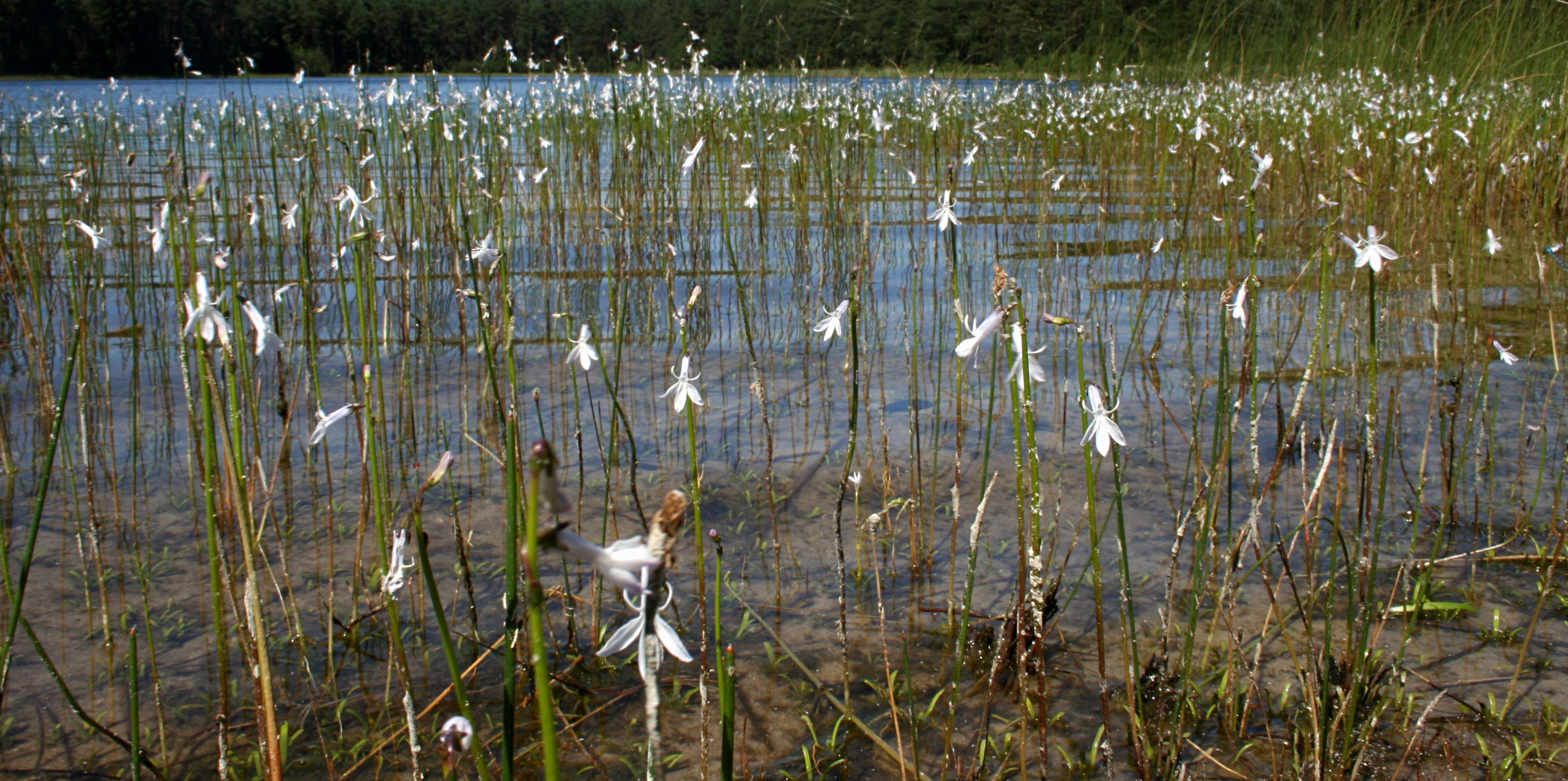
Lobelia dortmanna

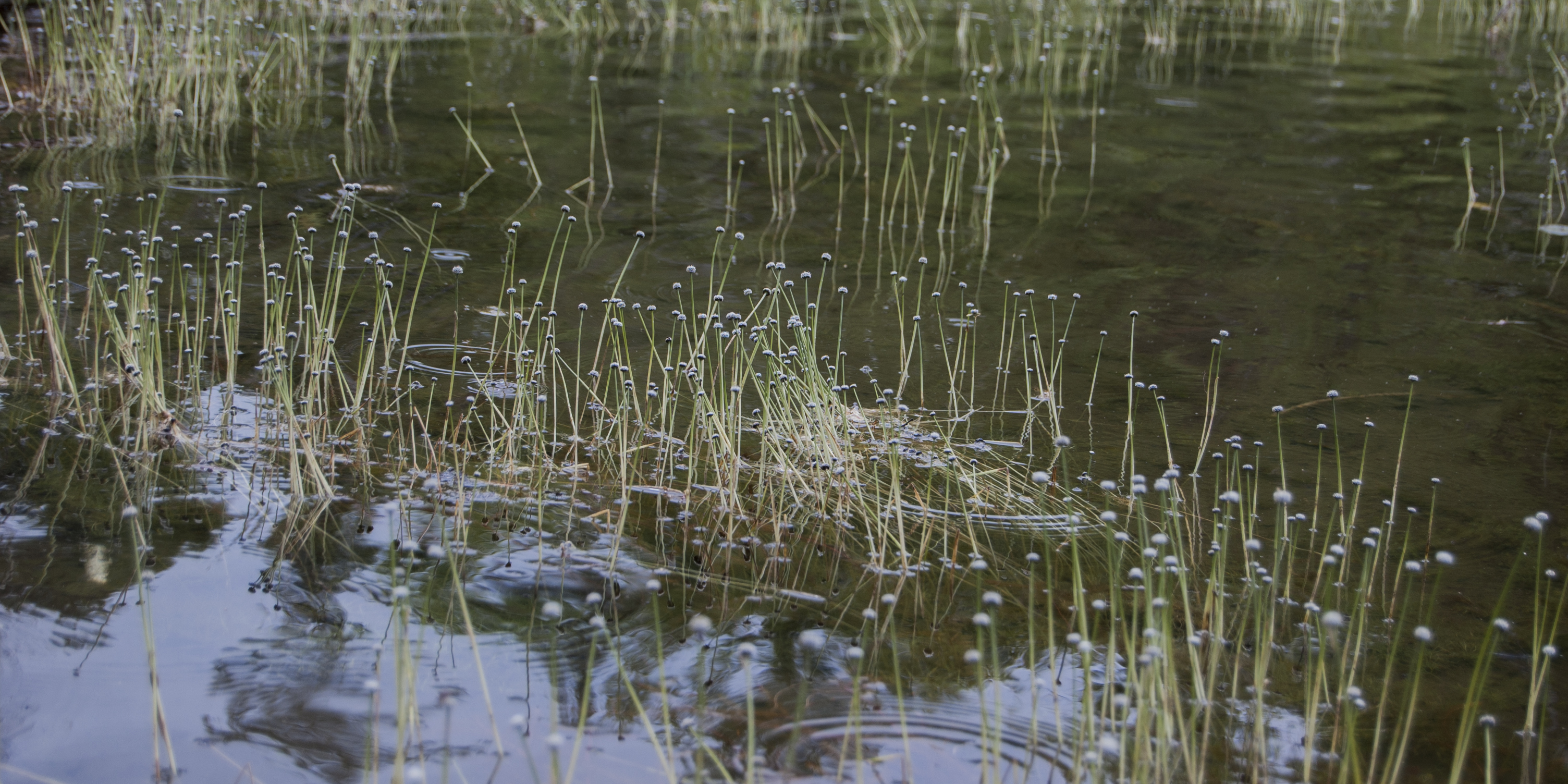
Eriocaulon aquaticum
