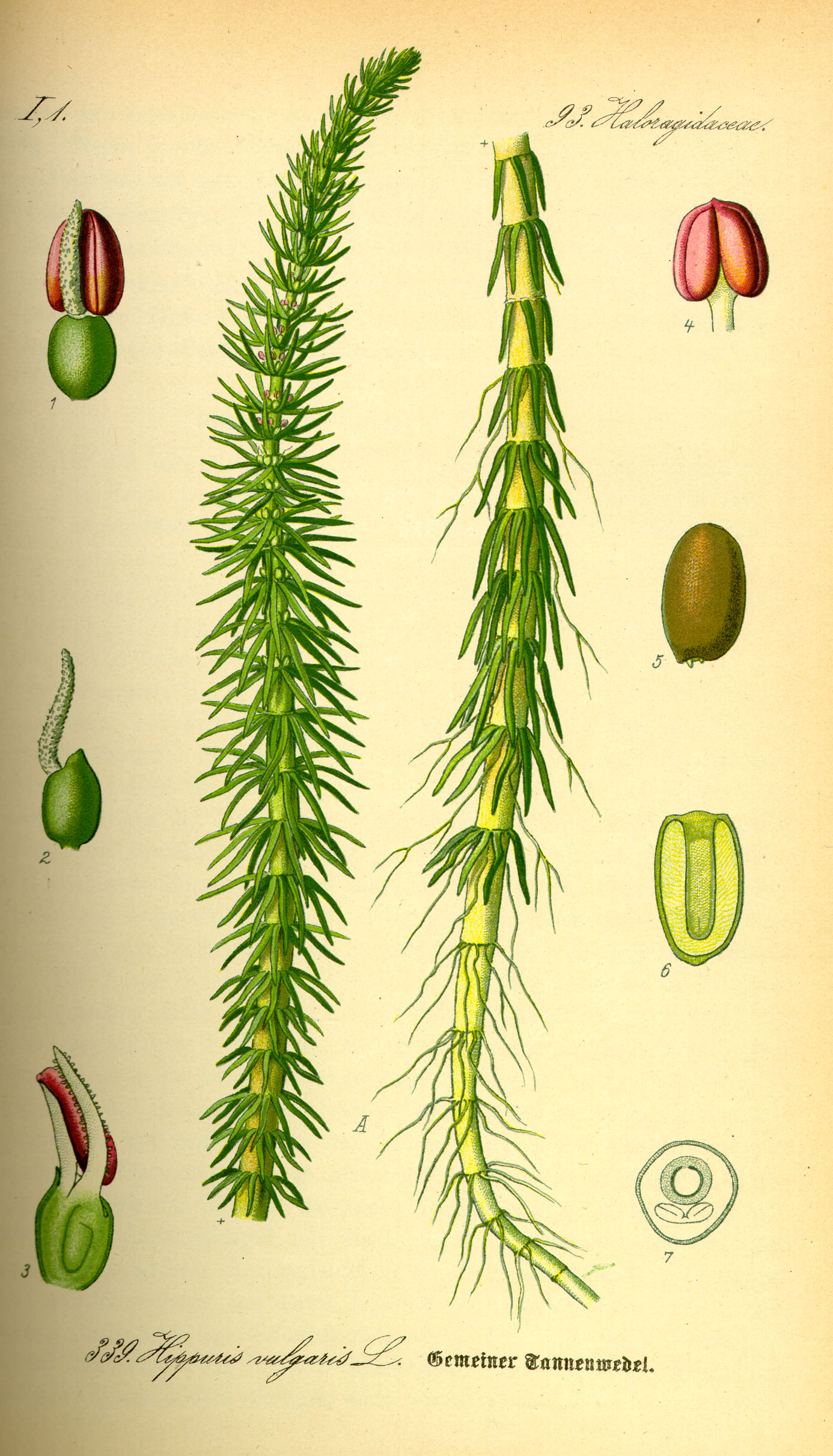
- Common mare's tail (Hippuris vulgaris) from Thomé; Flora von Deutschland, Österreich und der Schweiz 1885

Scientific classification
- Kingdom: Plantae
- Clade: Embryophytes
- Clade: Tracheophytes
- Clade: Spermatophytes
- Clade: Angiosperms
- Clade: Eudicots
- Clade: Asterids
- Order: Lamiales
- Family: Plantaginaceae
- Tribe: Callitricheae
- Genus: Hippuris; L.

Species
- Hippuris montana Ledeb. ex Rchb.; Hippuris tetraphylla L.f.; Hippuris vulgaris L.; Hippuris lanceolata Retz.

= Hippuris =

Genus of flowering plants

Hippuris, the mare's tail, was previously the sole genus in the family Hippuridaceae. Following genetic research by the Angiosperm Phylogeny Group, it has now been transferred to the family Plantaginaceae, with Hippuridaceae being reduced to a synonym of Plantaginaceae.

It includes one to four species depending on taxonomic interpretation. Some authorities only accept the first species of those listed below, treating the next two as synonyms of it:

- Common mare's tail, Hippuris vulgaris
  - Mountain mare's tail, Hippuris montana
  - Fourleaf mare's tail, Hippuris tetraphylla
  - Lance-leaved mare's-tail, Hippuris lanceolata

They are aquatic plants found in shallow ponds and streams, both slow-moving and fast-flowing. Hippuris, despite being a flowering plant, is sometimes mistakenly identified with the non-flowering plant horsetail.
