= Aquatic Botany =

- Discipline: Botany, ecology
- Language: English
- Edited by: T. Wernberg, B. I. van Tussenbroek, F. C. Aguiar

Publication details
- History: 1975–present
- Publisher: Elsevier
- Frequency: 8/year
- Impact factor: 2.473 (2020)

Standard abbreviations
- ISO 4: Aquat. Bot.

Indexing
- ISSN: 0304-3770
- OCLC no.: 2254712

Links
- Journal homepage; Online access

Aquatic Botany ("An International Scientific Journal dealing with Applied and Fundamental Research on Submerged, Floating and Emergent Plants in Marine and Freshwater Ecosystems") is a peer-reviewed scientific journal covering research on structure, function, dynamics, and classification of plant-dominated aquatic communities and ecosystems, as well as molecular, biochemical, and physiological aspects of aquatic plants. It publishes fundamental as well as applied research. The journal was established in 1975 by the late Cornelis (Kees) den Hartog. It is published by Elsevier and the editors-in-chief are Thomas Wernberg (University of Western Australia), Brigitta van Tussenbroek (National Autonomous University of Mexico), and Francisca Aguiar (University of Lisbon).

== Abstracting and indexing ==
The journal is abstracted and indexed in Aquatic Sciences and Fisheries Abstracts, BIOSIS Previews, Current Contents/Agriculture, Biology & Environmental Sciences, EMBiology, and Scopus. According to the Journal Citation Reports, the journal has a 2020 impact factor of 2.473.
