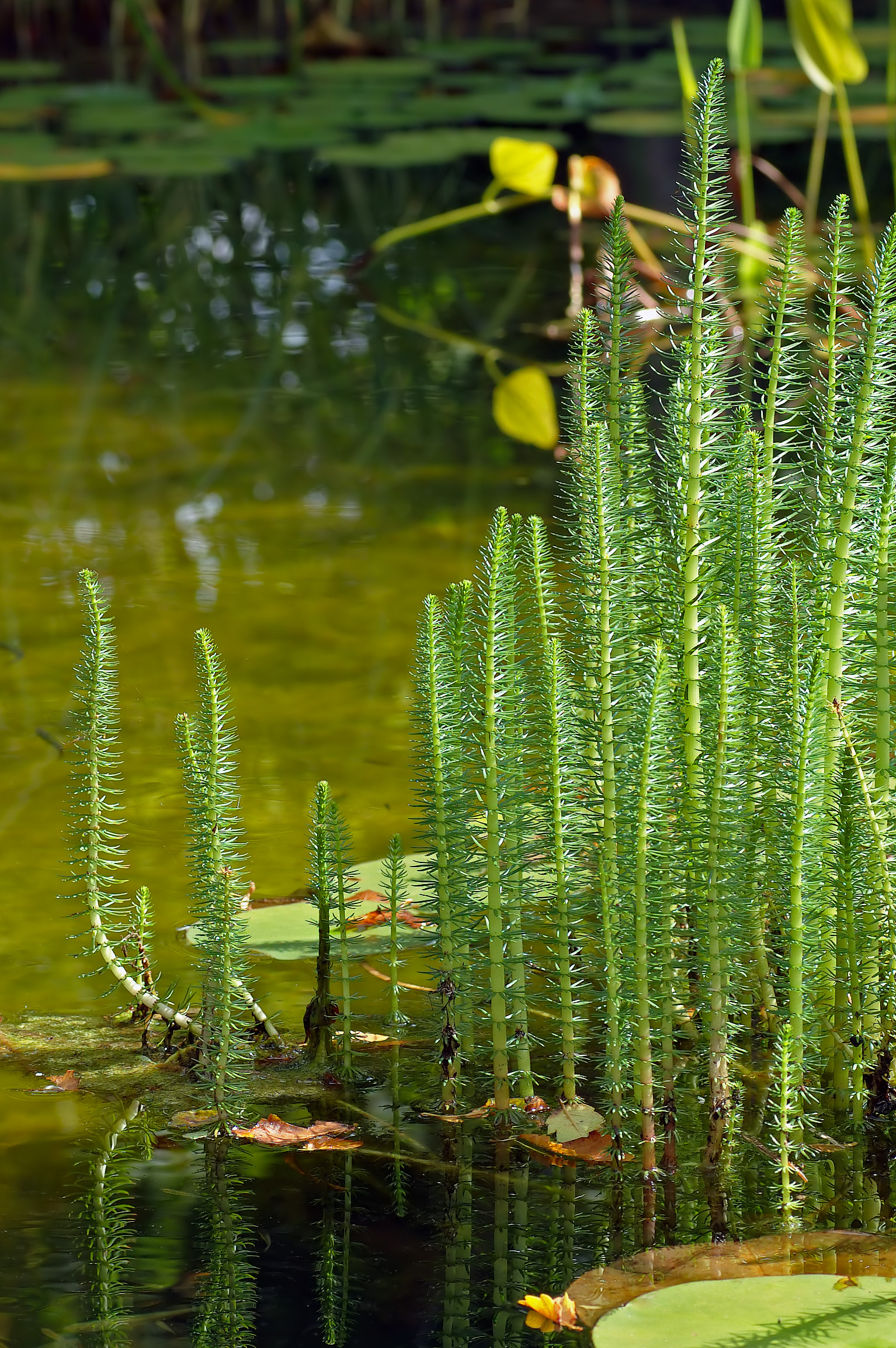

Conservation status
- Least Concern (IUCN 3.1)

- Secure (NatureServe)

Scientific classification
- Kingdom: Plantae
- Clade: Tracheophytes
- Clade: Angiosperms
- Clade: Eudicots
- Clade: Asterids
- Order: Lamiales
- Family: Plantaginaceae
- Genus: Hippuris
- Species: H. vulgaris

Binomial name
- Hippuris vulgaris L.

Synonyms
- Limnopeuce vulgaris

= Hippuris vulgaris =

Plant species in the veronica family

Hippuris vulgaris (from Greek: ἵππος – horse and οὐρά – tail), known as mare's-tail or common mare's-tail, is a common aquatic flowering plant in the family Plantaginaceae. Its distribution ranges from Eurasia and North America to Greenland, the Tibetan Plateau and Arizona. It prefers non-acidic waters.

== Description ==
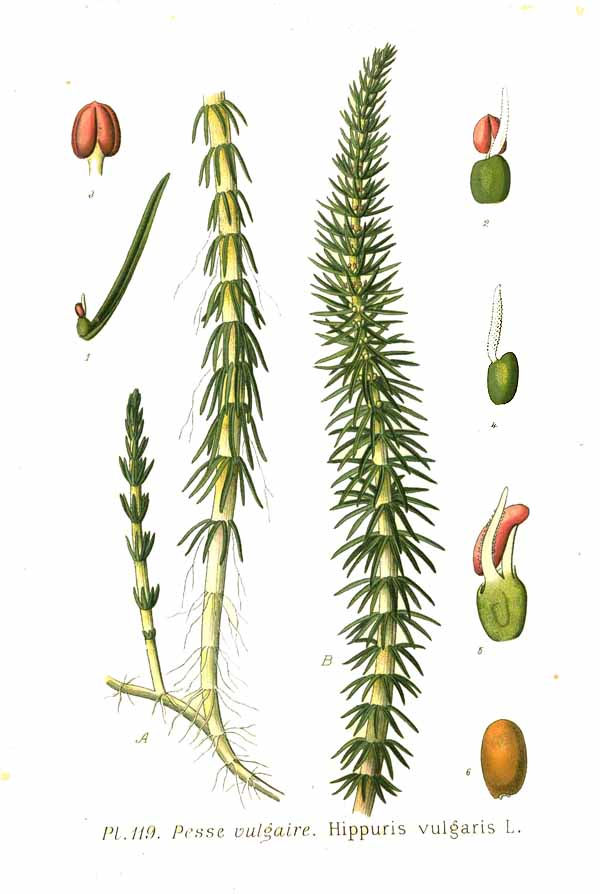
Drawing in Atlas des plantes de France

The common mare's tail is a creeping, perennial herb, found in shallow waters and mud flats. It roots underwater, but most of its leaves are above the water surface. The leaves occur in whorls of 6–12; those above water are 0.5 to 2.5 cm long and up to 3 mm wide, whereas those under water are thinner and limper, and longer than those above water, especially in deeper streams. The stems are solid and unbranched but often curve, and can be up to 60 cm long. In shallow water they project 20–30 cm out of the water. It grows from stout rhizomes. The flowers are inconspicuous, and not all plants produce them. Studies of H. vulgaris in the Tibetan Plateau have shown that it is a prolific methane emitter. The roots of H. vulgaris extend into the anoxic zone of wetland soils and create a conduit for methane produced in the anoxic zone to travel to the atmosphere.

Hippuris vulgaris in northeast Greenland in September

== Taxonomy ==
Hippuris vulgaris was given its scientific name in 1753 by Carl Linnaeus. It is classified as part of the genus Hippuris alongside three other species and along with its genus is part of the Plantaginaceae family. The species has no accepted varieties, but five have been described that are among its 20 synonyms.

Table of Synonyms
Name	Year	Rank	Notes
Caullinia hippuroides Raf.	1808	species	= het.
Hippuris eschscholtxii Cham. ex Ledeb.	1843	species	= het.
Hippuris fluitans Lilj. ex Hising.	1857	species	= het.
Hippuris fluviatilis Hoffm.	1800	species	= het.
Hippuris generalis E.H.L.Krause	1901	species	= het.
Hippuris melanocarpa N.Semenova	1959	species	= het.
Hippuris palustris Gorter	1761	species	= het.
Hippuris polyphylla Raf.	1817	species	= het.
Hippuris spiralis D.Yu	1990	species	= het.
Hippuris tetraphylla f. lacunarum Dutilly & Lepage	1954	form	= het.
Hippuris verticillata Gilib.	1792	species	= het., opus utique oppr.
Hippuris vulgaris var. demersa Gray	1821	variety	= het.
Hippuris vulgaris var. fluitans Hartm.	1820	variety	= het.
Hippuris vulgaris var. fluviatilis (Hoffm.) Mérat	1812	variety	= het.
Hippuris vulgaris var. gigantea Zalewski	1896	variety	= het.
Hippuris vulgaris f. lacunarum (Dutilly & Lepage) Lepage	1971	form	= het.
Hippuris vulgaris f. litoralis H.Lindb.	1906	form	= het.
Hippuris vulgaris var. ramificans D.Yu	1990	variety	= het.
Isnardia palustris Lucé	1823	species	= het., sensu auct.
Limnopeuce vulgaris (L.) Vaill. ex Greene	1894	species	≡ hom.
Notes: ≡ homotypic synonym; = heterotypic synonym

== Uses ==
It can also be a troublesome weed, obstructing the flow of water in rivers and ditches.
