= Lesser duckweed =

Lesser duckweed is a common name for several plants and may refer to:

- Lemna aequinoctialis
- Lemna minor, also common duckweed
