= L. minuta =

L. minuta may refer to:

- Lemna minuta, the least duckweed, an aquatic plant species native to parts of the Americas
- Lyces minuta, a moth species endemic to eastern Ecuador

== See also ==
- Minuta
