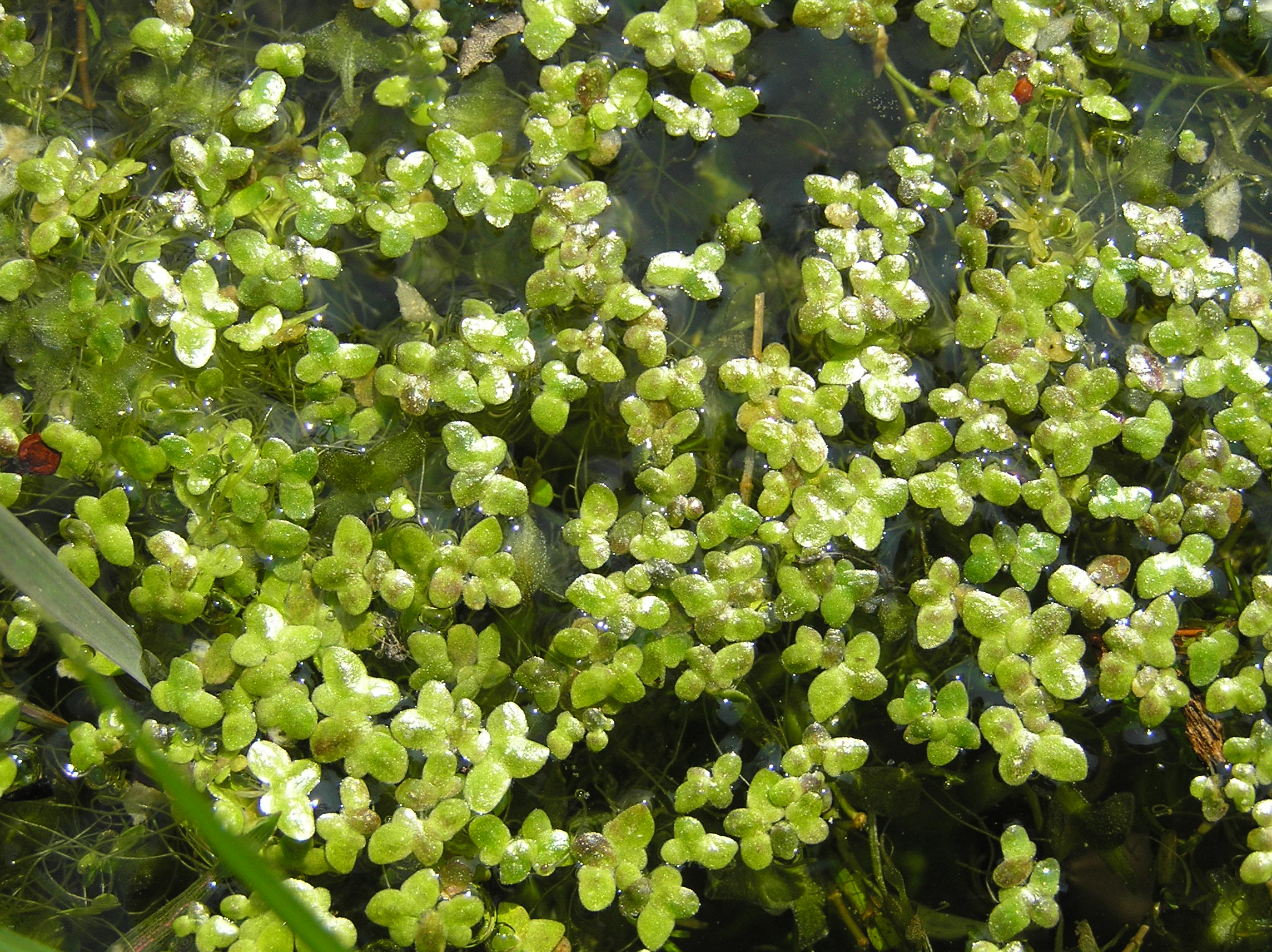

Conservation status
- Least Concern (IUCN 3.1)

Scientific classification
- Kingdom: Plantae
- Clade: Embryophytes
- Clade: Tracheophytes
- Clade: Spermatophytes
- Clade: Angiosperms
- Clade: Monocots
- Order: Alismatales
- Family: Araceae
- Genus: Lemna
- Species: L. turionifera

Binomial name
- Lemna turionifera Landolt

= Lemna turionifera =

Species of flowering plant

Lemna turionifera is a species of flowering plant belonging to the family Araceae.

The species is a floating freshwater aquatic plant, with one, two, three or four leaves each having a single root hanging in the water. Like its close relative Lemna minor, it reproduces primarily vegetatively. Unlike L. minor, however, the species is also capable of producing turions, which are starch-filled fronds that sink to the substrate and remain dormant until germinating when conditions are favorable.

Its native range is Northern Europe to Japan, Northern America.
