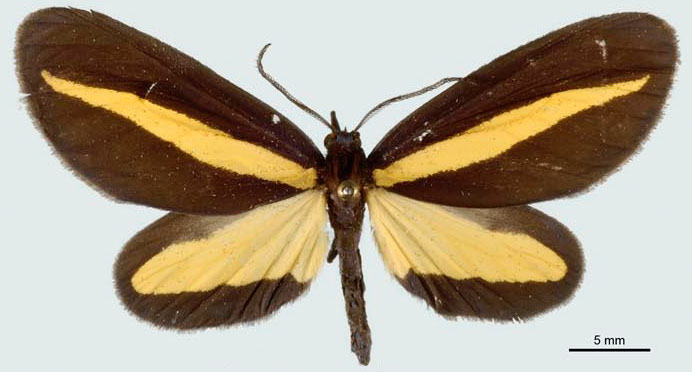

Scientific classification
- Domain: Eukaryota
- Kingdom: Animalia
- Phylum: Arthropoda
- Class: Insecta
- Order: Lepidoptera
- Superfamily: Noctuoidea
- Family: Erebidae
- Subfamily: Arctiinae
- Genus: Crocomela
- Species: C. erectistria

Binomial name
- Crocomela erectistria (Warren, 1904)

Synonyms
- Josia erectistria Warren, 1904; Josiomorpha elisa Druce, 1911

= Crocomela erectistria =

Species of moth

Crocomela erectistria is a moth of the subfamily Arctiinae. It is found in Ecuador.

It is involved in Müllerian mimicry with Lyces striata.

The larvae feed on Boraginaceae species.
