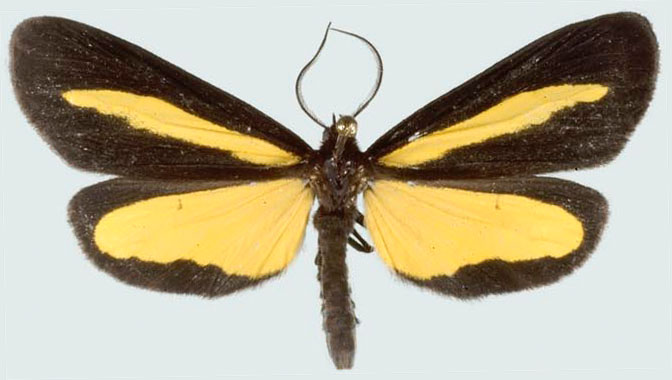

Scientific classification
- Kingdom: Animalia
- Phylum: Arthropoda
- Clade: Pancrustacea
- Class: Insecta
- Order: Lepidoptera
- Superfamily: Noctuoidea
- Family: Notodontidae
- Genus: Lyces
- Species: L. longistria

Binomial name
- Lyces longistria (Warren, 1904)

Synonyms
- Josia longistria Warren, 1904

= Lyces longistria =

Species of moth

Lyces longistria is a moth of the family Notodontidae first described by William Warren in 1904. It is found in eastern Ecuador.

Larvae have been reared on Passiflora monadelpha.
