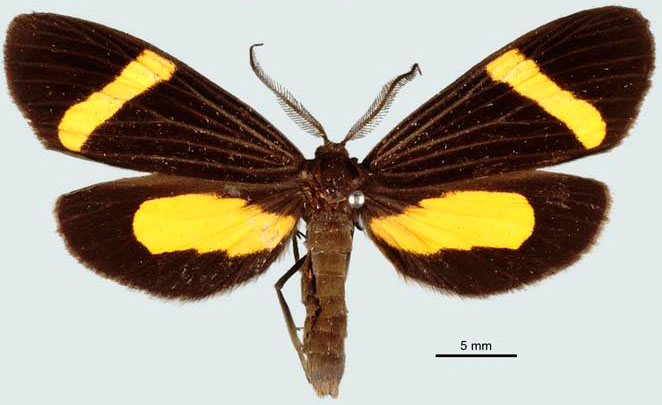

Scientific classification
- Kingdom: Animalia
- Phylum: Arthropoda
- Clade: Pancrustacea
- Class: Insecta
- Order: Lepidoptera
- Superfamily: Noctuoidea
- Family: Notodontidae
- Genus: Lyces
- Species: L. angulosa

Binomial name
- Lyces angulosa Walker, 1854

Synonyms
- Ephialtias morena Warren, 1906

= Lyces angulosa =

Species of moth

Lyces angulosa is a moth of the family Notodontidae. It is endemic to the Atlantic coastal forest of Brazil.

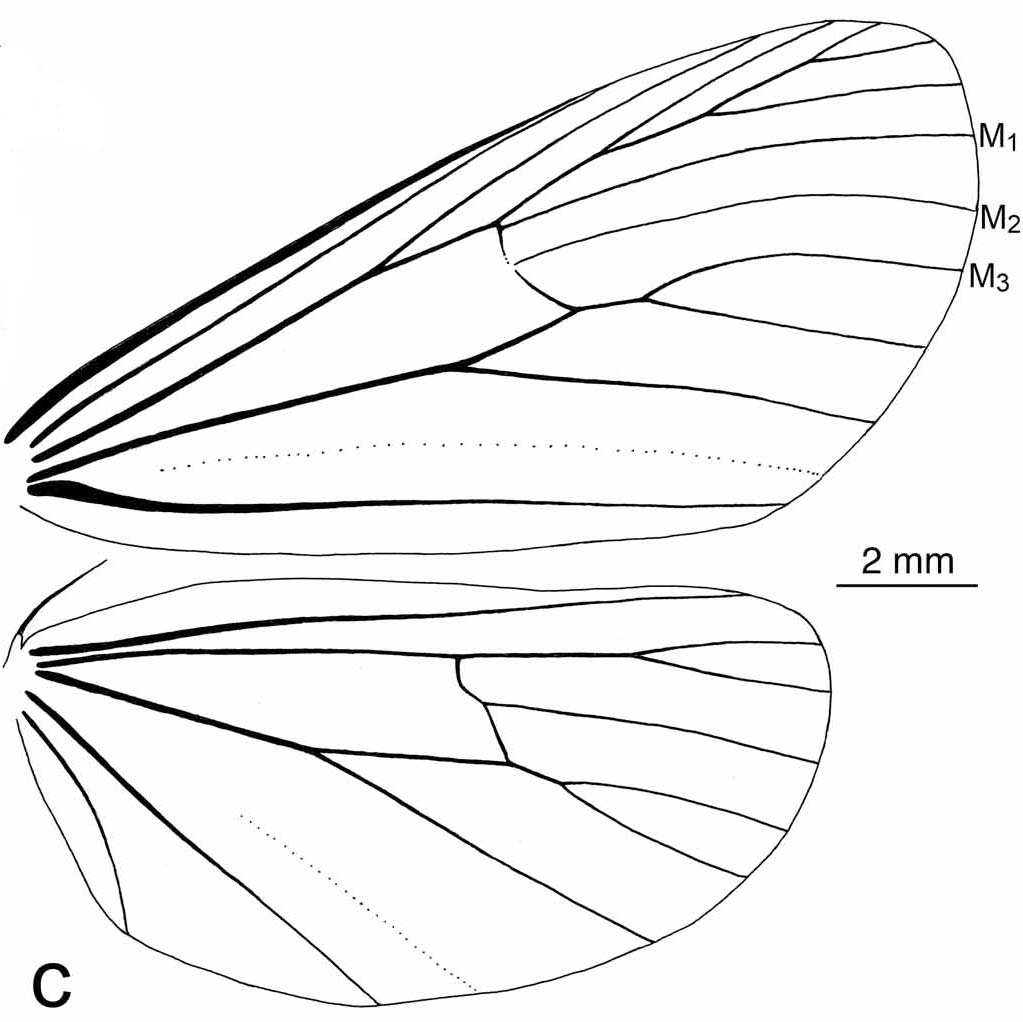
Wing venation
