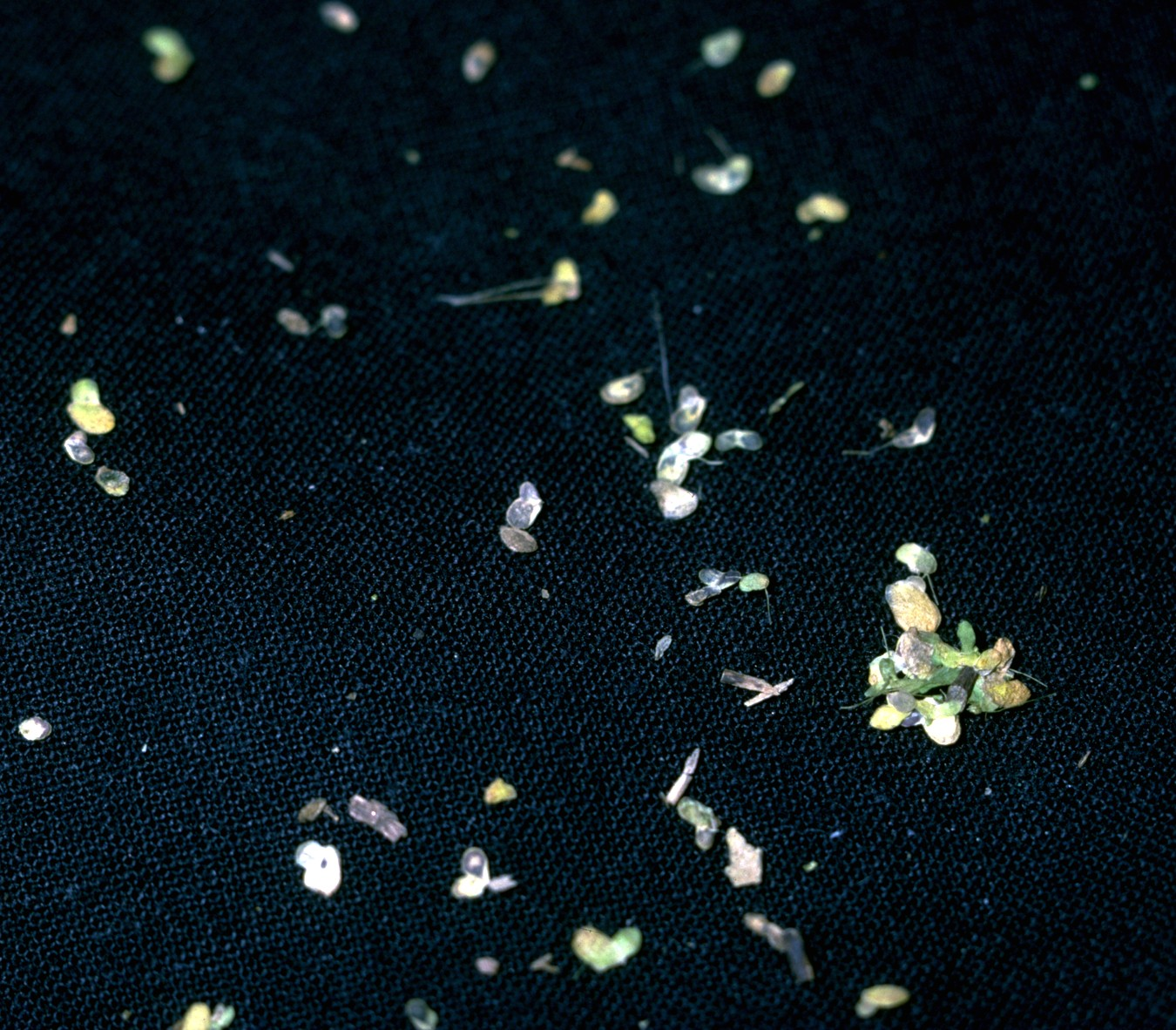

Conservation status
- Least Concern (IUCN 3.1)

- Secure (NatureServe)

Scientific classification
- Kingdom: Plantae
- Clade: Embryophytes
- Clade: Tracheophytes
- Clade: Spermatophytes
- Clade: Angiosperms
- Clade: Monocots
- Order: Alismatales
- Family: Araceae
- Genus: Lemna
- Species: L. valdiviana

Binomial name
- Lemna valdiviana Phil.

Synonyms
- Lemna cyclostasa; Lemna torreyi

= Lemna valdiviana =

Species of flowering plant

Lemna valdiviana is a species of duckweed known by the common name Valdivia duckweed. It is native to much of the Americas. It is a minute flowering plant which grows in mats on the surface of calm bodies of freshwater. The individual plant is a flat, translucent, pale green oval body 2 to 4 millimeters long. There is a longitudinal vein visible under magnification and microscopy. The body produces a root which may exceed a centimeter in length, and a tiny, ephemeral flower which is often encapsulated in a membrane. The plant often grows in clusters of two to seven individuals.
