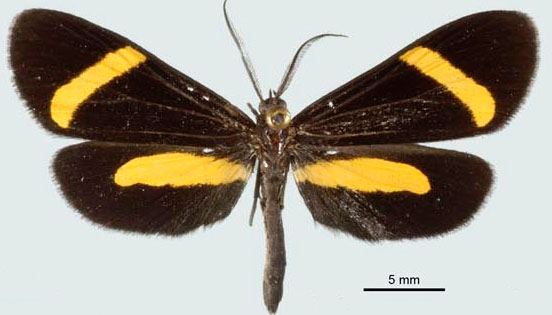

Scientific classification
- Kingdom: Animalia
- Phylum: Arthropoda
- Clade: Pancrustacea
- Class: Insecta
- Order: Lepidoptera
- Superfamily: Noctuoidea
- Family: Notodontidae
- Genus: Lyces
- Species: L. constricta

Binomial name
- Lyces constricta (Warren, 1901)

Synonyms
- Josia constricta Warren, 1901

= Lyces constricta =

Species of moth

Lyces constricta is a moth of the family Notodontidae first described by William Warren in 1901. It is found in the Atlantic coastal forest of Brazil from Bahia to Rio Grande do Sul.
