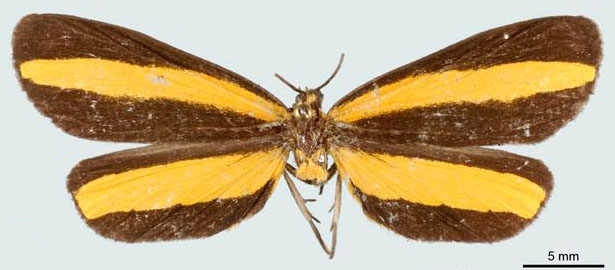

Scientific classification
- Kingdom: Animalia
- Phylum: Arthropoda
- Clade: Pancrustacea
- Class: Insecta
- Order: Lepidoptera
- Superfamily: Noctuoidea
- Family: Notodontidae
- Genus: Lyces
- Species: L. tamara

Binomial name
- Lyces tamara (Hering, 1925)

Synonyms
- Josia tamara Hering, 1925

= Lyces tamara =

Species of moth

Lyces tamara is a moth of the family Notodontidae first described by Hering in 1925. It is found in southern Mexico and Guatemala.
