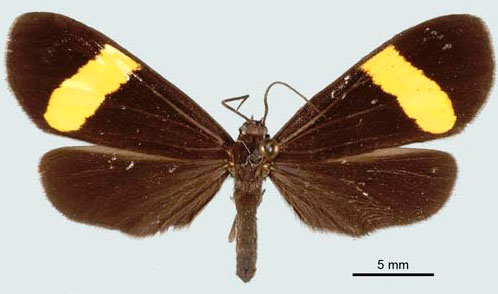

Scientific classification
- Kingdom: Animalia
- Phylum: Arthropoda
- Clade: Pancrustacea
- Class: Insecta
- Order: Lepidoptera
- Superfamily: Noctuoidea
- Family: Notodontidae
- Genus: Lyces
- Species: L. ena

Binomial name
- Lyces ena (Boisduval, 1870)

Synonyms
- Ephialtias tryma Schaus, 1896; Josia ena Boisduval, 1870

= Lyces ena =

Species of moth

Lyces ena is a moth of the family Notodontidae first described by Jean Baptiste Boisduval in 1870. It is found from Panama to Brazil and Amazonian Peru, and also occurring on Trinidad.
