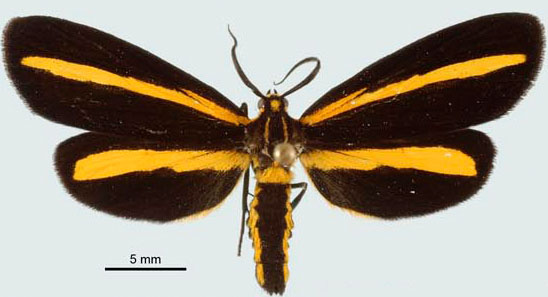

Scientific classification
- Kingdom: Animalia
- Phylum: Arthropoda
- Clade: Pancrustacea
- Class: Insecta
- Order: Lepidoptera
- Superfamily: Noctuoidea
- Family: Notodontidae
- Genus: Lyces
- Species: L. annulata

Binomial name
- Lyces annulata (Dognin, 1909)

Synonyms
- Josia punonis Strand, 1920; Josia annulata Dognin, 1909

= Lyces annulata =

Species of moth

Lyces annulata is a moth of the family Notodontidae. It is found from Venezuela to Peru along the eastern slopes of the Andes.

Larvae have been reared on Passiflora nitida, Passiflora cyanea and Passiflora maliformis.
