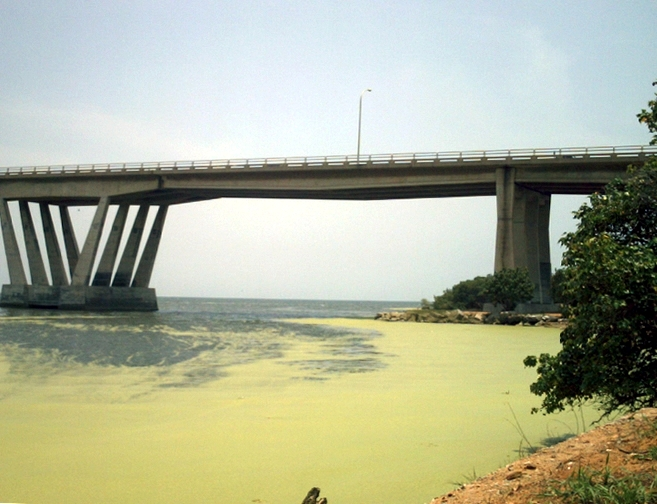

Scientific classification
- Kingdom: Plantae
- Clade: Embryophytes
- Clade: Tracheophytes
- Clade: Spermatophytes
- Clade: Angiosperms
- Clade: Monocots
- Order: Alismatales
- Family: Araceae
- Genus: Lemna
- Species: L. obscura

Binomial name
- Lemna obscura (Austin) Daubs

Synonyms
- Lemna ecuadoriensis Landolt

= Lemna obscura =

Species of flowering plant

Lemna obscura is a species of plant in the subfamily Lemnoideae of the family Araceae. It ranges from the United States south to Colombia and Ecuador.
