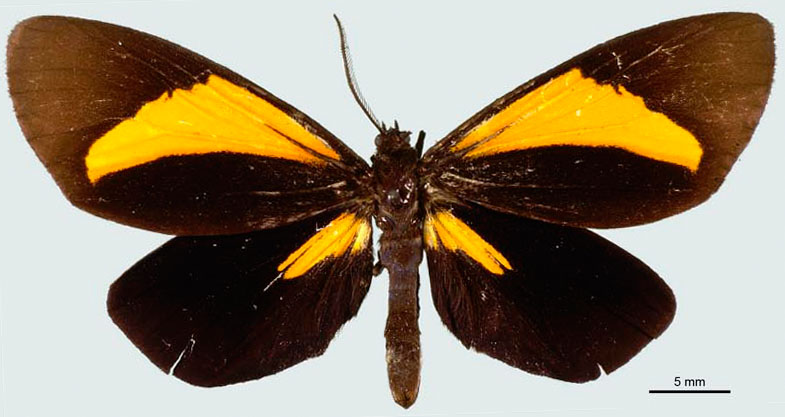

Scientific classification
- Kingdom: Animalia
- Phylum: Arthropoda
- Clade: Pancrustacea
- Class: Insecta
- Order: Lepidoptera
- Superfamily: Noctuoidea
- Family: Notodontidae
- Genus: Lyces
- Species: L. vulturata

Binomial name
- Lyces vulturata (Warren, 1904)

Synonyms
- Josia vulturata Warren, 1904; Scea vulturata (Warren, 1904)

= Lyces vulturata =

Species of moth

Lyces vulturata is a moth of the family Notodontidae. It is found on high-altitudes in Peru

It is involved in Müllerian mimicry with the arctiid Crocomela flammifera.
