= Crocomela fusifera =

Scientific classification
- Kingdom: Animalia
- Phylum: Arthropoda
- Class: Insecta
- Order: Lepidoptera
- Superfamily: Noctuoidea
- Family: Erebidae
- Subfamily: Arctiinae
- Genus: Crocomela
- Species: C. fusifera

Binomial name
- Crocomela fusifera (Walker, 1856)

Synonyms
- Flavinia fusifera Walker, 1856; Crocomela acuminata Hering, 1925

Species of moth

Crocomela fusifera is a moth of the subfamily Arctiinae. It was described by Francis Walker in 1856. It is found in Colombia.
