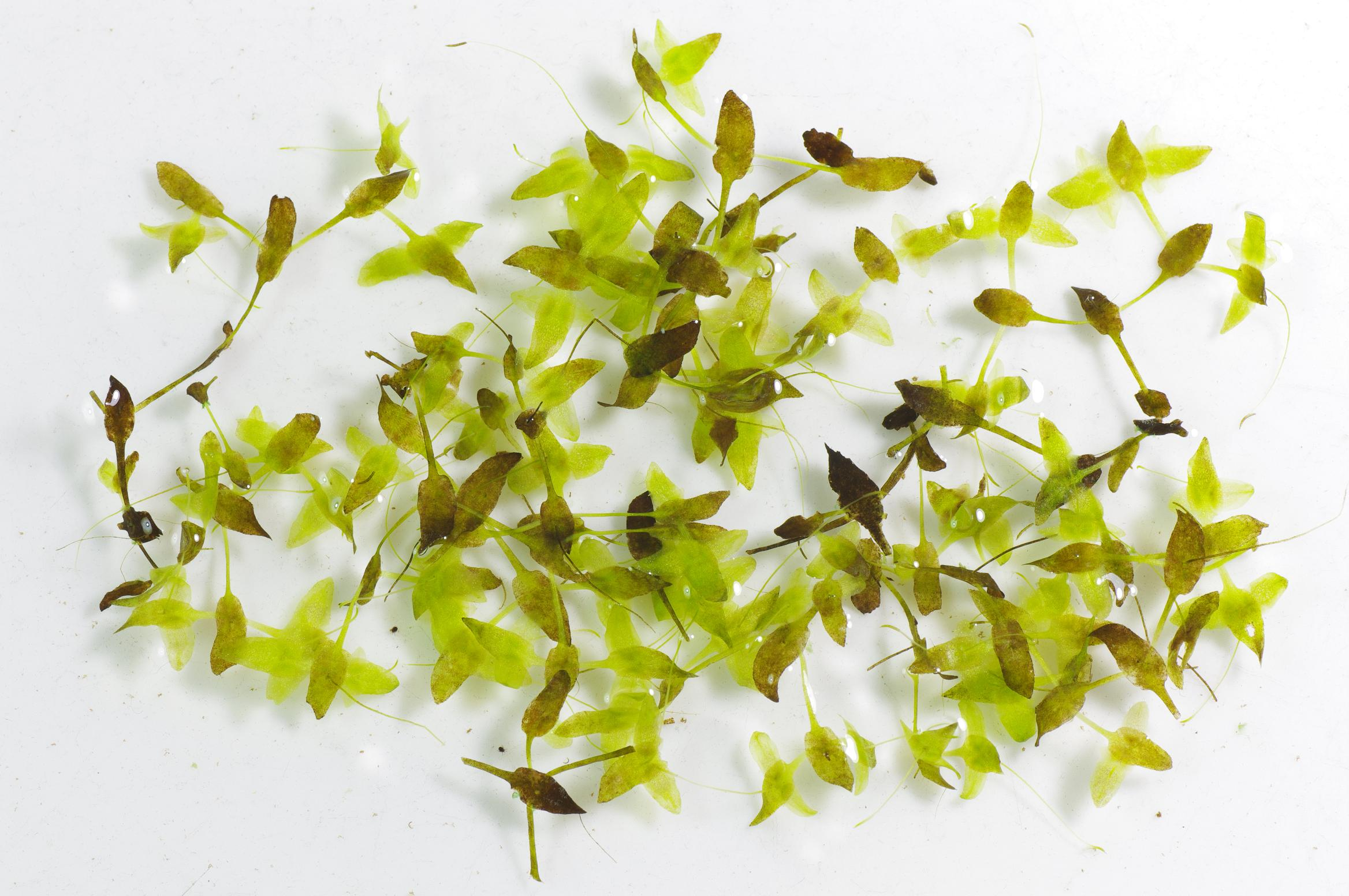

Conservation status
- Least Concern (IUCN 3.1)

Scientific classification
- Kingdom: Plantae
- Clade: Embryophytes
- Clade: Tracheophytes
- Clade: Spermatophytes
- Clade: Angiosperms
- Clade: Monocots
- Order: Alismatales
- Family: Araceae
- Genus: Lemna
- Species: L. trisulca

Binomial name
- Lemna trisulca L.

= Lemna trisulca =

Species of flowering plant

Lemna trisulca L. (syn. Staurogeton trisulcus (L.) Schur; star duckweed; ivy-leaved duckweed) is a species of aquatic plants in the arum family Araceae. It has a subcosmopolitan distribution. Unlike other duckweeds, it has submerged rather than floating fronds (up to 12–14 m (39–46 ft) below the surface), except when flowering or fruiting. Also unlike other duckweeds, a large number of fronds remain attached to each other at a time.

== Description ==
The fronds usually grow submerged and are oblong-lanceolate in shape and are up to 14 mm long. They are blunt at the end and taper to a tail-like stalk at the other.

The flowering fronds are smaller than the vegetative fronds and somewhat curl up from under the water to the surface to present the flowers (to a casual look this may cause the flowering fronds to resemble reddened duckweeds more of the L. minor format with white flower spots, with obvious greener L. trisulca directly beneath); illustration photo of flowers.

== Distribution ==
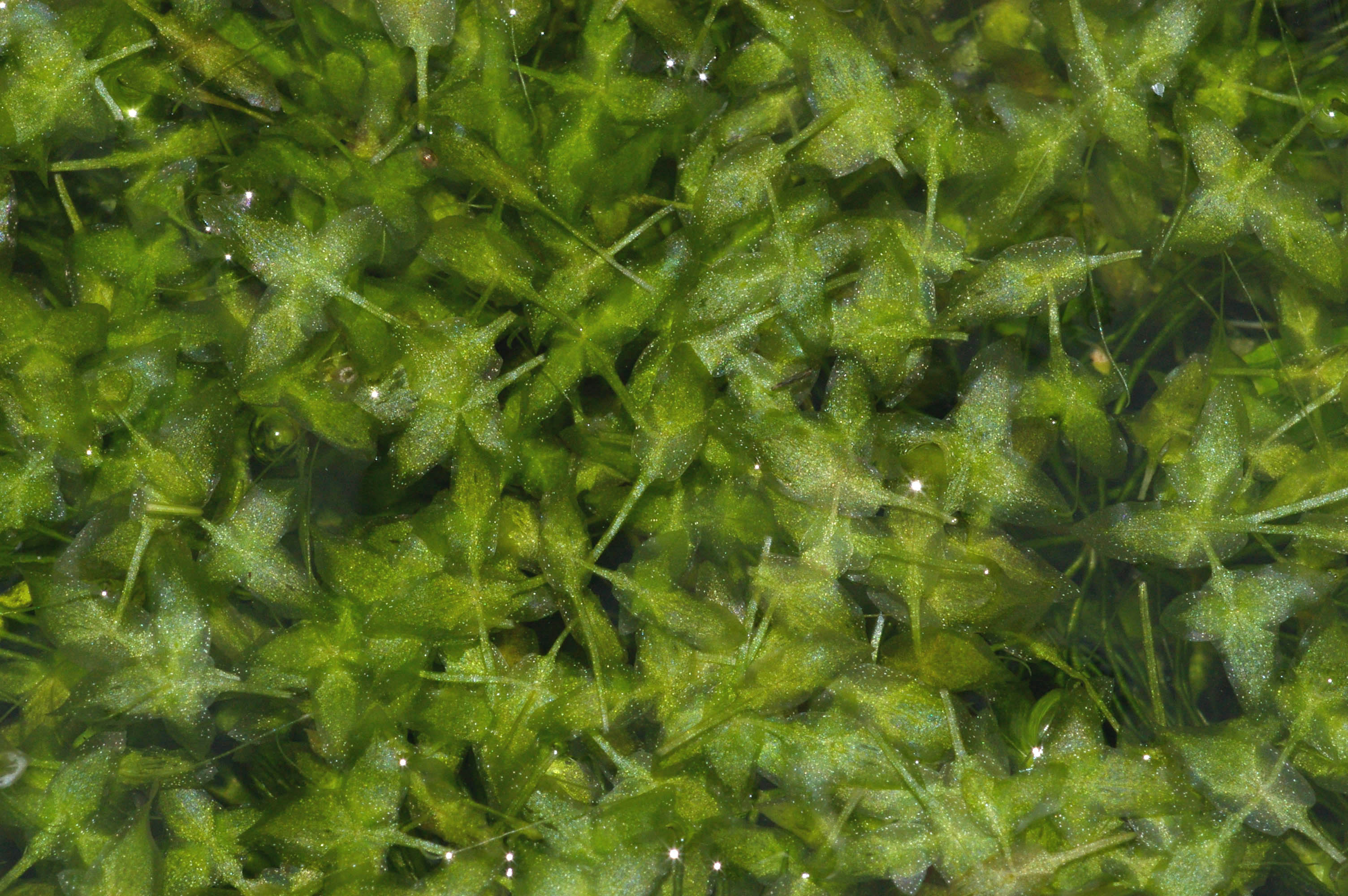
Lemna trisulca submerged beneath a pool of water

This species is widely distributed in cool-temperate regions, including Great Britain and Ireland, Asia (Bangladesh, China (Northern, Western, Southern [Yunnan]), Taiwan, India (Eastern, Northern), Indonesia (Sumatra, New Guinea), Brunei, Japan, Malaysia, Myanmar, Papua New Guinea, Pakistan, Philippines); Europe; Oceania; N. America; and S. America.
