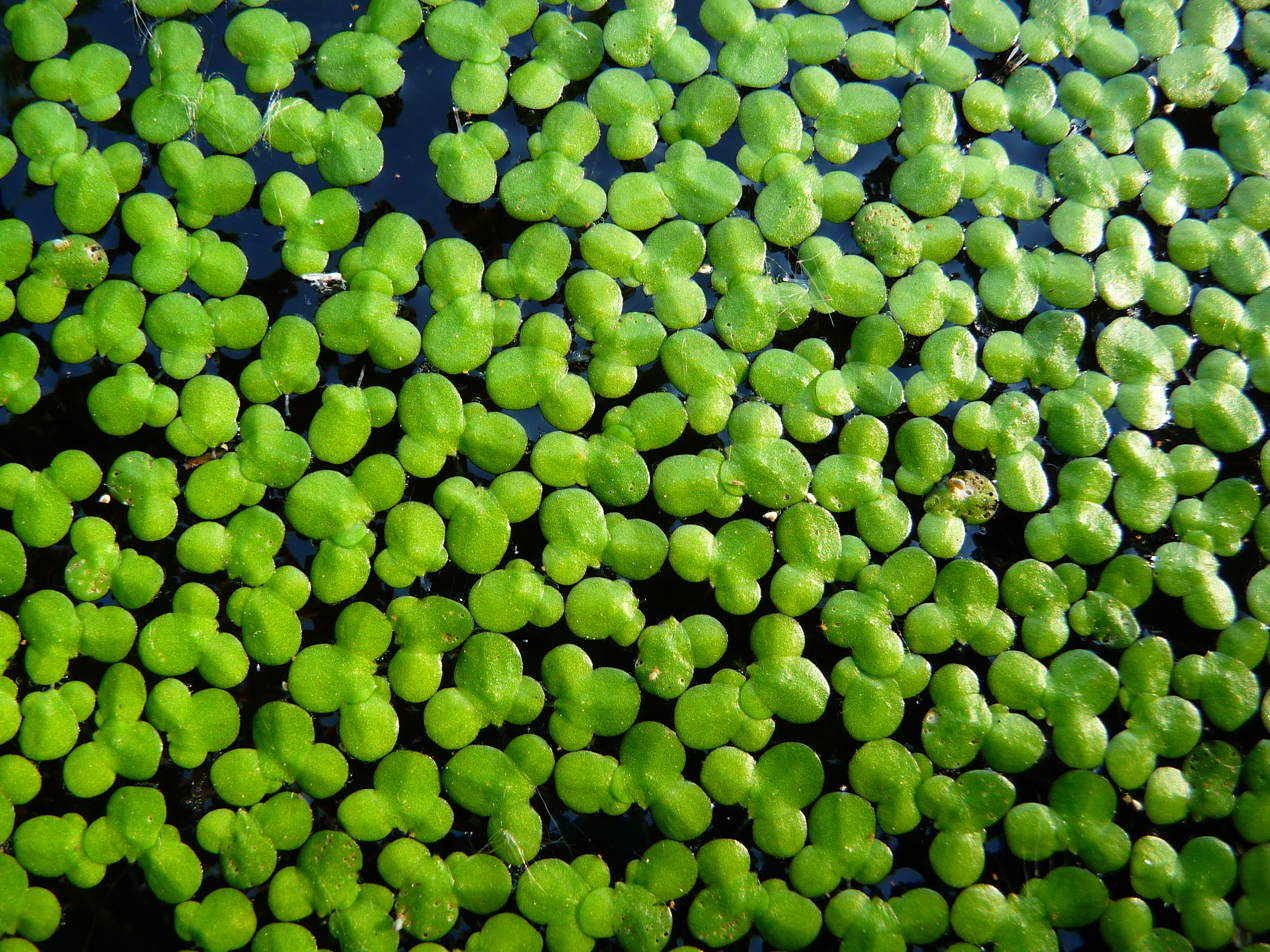
- Common duckweed (Lemna minor)

Scientific classification
- Kingdom: Plantae
- Clade: Tracheophytes
- Clade: Angiosperms
- Clade: Monocots
- Order: Alismatales
- Family: Araceae
- Subfamily: Lemnoideae
- Genus: Lemna; L.

Synonyms
- Staurogeton Rchb.; Lenticularia Ség.; Lenticula P.Micheli ex Adans.; Hydrophace Hallier; Telmatophace Schleid.; Thelmatophace Godr.; Lenticularia P.Micheli ex Montandon

= Lemna =

Genus of aquatic plants

Lemna is a genus of free-floating aquatic plants referred to by the common name "duckweed". They are morphologically divergent members of the arum family Araceae. These rapidly growing plants have found uses as a model system for studies in community ecology, basic plant biology, ecotoxicology, and production of biopharmaceuticals, and as a source of animal feeds for agriculture and aquaculture. Currently, 14 species of Lemna are recognised.

== Taxonomy ==
Lemna were previously placed in a separate flowering plant family, the Lemnaceae, but they are now considered to be members of the Araceae.

== Description ==
Lemna species grow as simple free-floating thalli on or just beneath the water surface. Most are small, not exceeding 5 mm in length, except Lemna trisulca, which is elongated and has a branched structure. Lemna thalli have a single root, which distinguishes this genus from the related genera Wolffia (lacks roots), Spirodela and Landoltia (have multiple roots).

The plants grow mainly by vegetative reproduction: two daughter plants bud off from the adult plant. Lemna are flowering plants, and nearly all of them are known to reproduce sexually, flowering and producing seed under appropriate conditions. Certain species of Lemna (such as L. gibba) are long-day plants, while others (such as L. minor) are short-day plants.

Owing to their vegetative reproduction strategies, Lemna species can quickly colonize open water bodies, particularly those with minimal surface flow. Removal of Lemna can be done through mechanical removal (e.g., skimming), biological controls (e.g., herbivorous fish), or treatment with aquatic herbicides.

The rapid growth habit of Lemna presents applications in bioremediation of polluted waters, in municipal wastewater treatment, and as test organisms for environmental studies. Species of Lemna are also used as an expression system for economical production of complex biopharmaceuticals.

Dried Lemna ("duckweed meal") can be used as livestock feed. It contains 25–45% protein (depending on the growth conditions), 4.4% fat, and 8–10% fibre, measured by dry weight.

== As a bioassay ==
Organisation for Economic Co-operation and Development and U.S. Environmental Protection Agency (US EPA) guidelines describe toxicity testing using L. gibba or L. minor as test organisms. Both of these species have been studied extensively for use in phytotoxicity tests. Genetic variability in responses to toxicants can occur in Lemna, and data are insufficient to recommend a specific clone for testing. The US EPA test uses aseptic technique. The OECD test is not conducted axenically, but steps are taken at stages during the test procedure to keep contamination by other organisms to a minimum. Depending on the objectives of the test and the regulatory requirements, testing may be performed with renewal (semistatic and flow-through) or without renewal (static) of the test solution. Renewal is useful for substances that are rapidly lost from solution as a result of volatilisation, photodegradation, precipitation, or biodegradation.

== Production of biopharmaceuticals ==
Lemna has been transformed by molecular biologists to express proteins of pharmaceutical interest. Expression constructs were engineered to cause Lemna to secrete the transformed proteins into the growth medium at high yield. Since the Lemna is grown on a simple medium, this substantially reduces the burden of protein purification in preparing such proteins for medical use, promising substantial reductions in manufacturing costs. In addition, the host Lemna can be engineered to cause secretion of proteins with human patterns of glycosylation, an improvement over conventional plant gene-expression systems. Several such products are being developed, including monoclonal antibodies.

== Lemna farming ==
High yields of Lemna with a high protein content for use in human nutrition, animal and fish feed can be achieved by careful control of growth conditions. Although Lemna can tolerate temperatures ranging from 6 °C (43 °F) to 33 °C (91 °F), the optimal growth range is 20 °C (68 °F) to 28 °C (82 °F)}. The acceptable pH range is 5 to 9, but better growth is obtained in the pH range of 6.5 to 7.5}. A minimum water depth of 1 foot (30 cm) is desirable to prevent excessive temperature swings. High nitrogen levels, for example 20 mM urea, have provided a protein content in the range of 45% by dry weight.

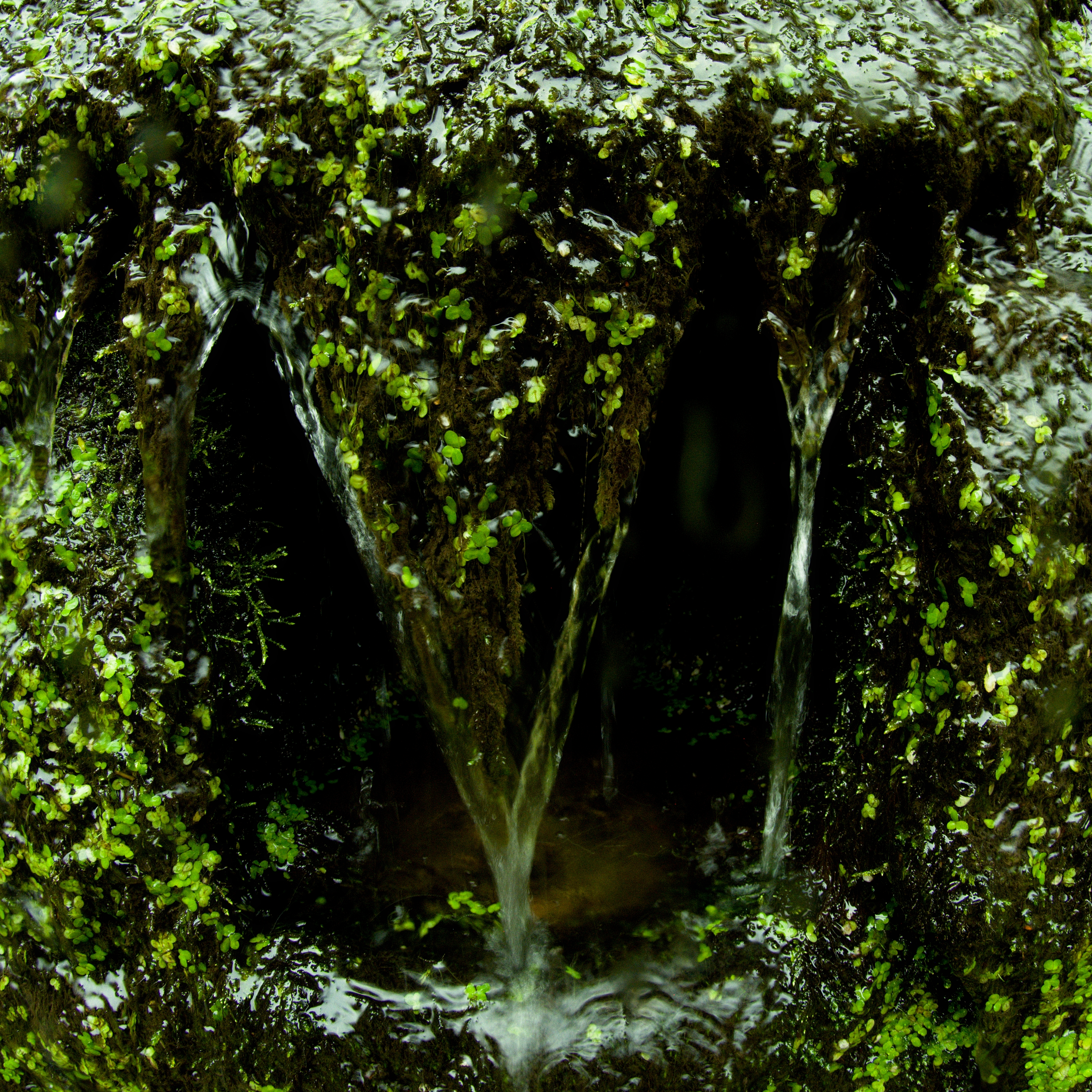
Lemna in small stream, Usti nad Labem, Czech Republic

Lemna can be farmed organically, with nutrients being supplied from a variety of sources, for example human urine, cattle manure, pig waste, biogas plant slurry, or other organic matter in slurry form. Because of the rapid growth of Lemna, daily harvesting is necessary to achieve optimal yields. Harvesting is done such that less than 1 kg/m^{2} of duckweed remains. Under optimal conditions, a duckweed farm can produce 10 to 30 tons of dried duckweed per hectare per year.

== Species ==
Infrageneric classification following Les et al. 2002.

Section Alatae

- Lemna aequinoctialis Welw. – lesser duckweed – tropical and subtropical
- Lemna perpusilla Torr. – minute duckweed – eastern United States, Quebec

Section Biformes

- Lemna tenera Kurz – Indochina, Sumatra, Northern Territory of Australia

Section Lemna

- Lemna disperma Hegelm.
- Lemna ecuadoriensis Landolt
- Lemna gibba L. – gibbous duckweed – widespread
- Lemna japonica Landolt – Japan, China, Korea, Russian Far East
- Lemna minor L. – common duckweed – cosmopolitan
- Lemna obscura (Austin) Daubs – United States, Mexico, Bahamas, Colombia, Ecuador
- Lemna trisulca L. – ivy duckweed – cosmopolitan
- Lemna turionifera Landolt – temperate Europe, Asia, North America

Section Uninerves

- Lemna minuta Kunth – least duckweed – North + South America
- Lemna valdiviana Phil. – Valdivia duckweed – North and South America
- Lemna yungensis Landolt – Bolivia

Formerly placed here

- Landoltia punctata (G.Mey.) Les & D.J.Crawford (as L. oligorrhiza Kurz and L. punctata G.Mey.)
- Spirodela polyrhiza (L.) Schleid. (as L. polyrhiza L.)
- Wolffia arrhiza (L.) Horkel ex Wimm. (as L. arrhiza L.)
- Wolffia globosa (Roxb.) Hartog & Plas (as L. globosa Roxb.)

== General readings ==
- Cross, J.W. (2006). The Charms of Duckweed.
- Landolt, E. (1986) Biosystematic investigations in the family of duckweeds (Lemnaceae). Vol. 2. The family of Lemnaceae – A monographic study. Part 1 of the monograph: Morphology; karyology; ecology; geographic distribution; systematic position; nomenclature; descriptions. Veröff. Geobot. Inst., Stiftung Rübel, ETH, Zurich.
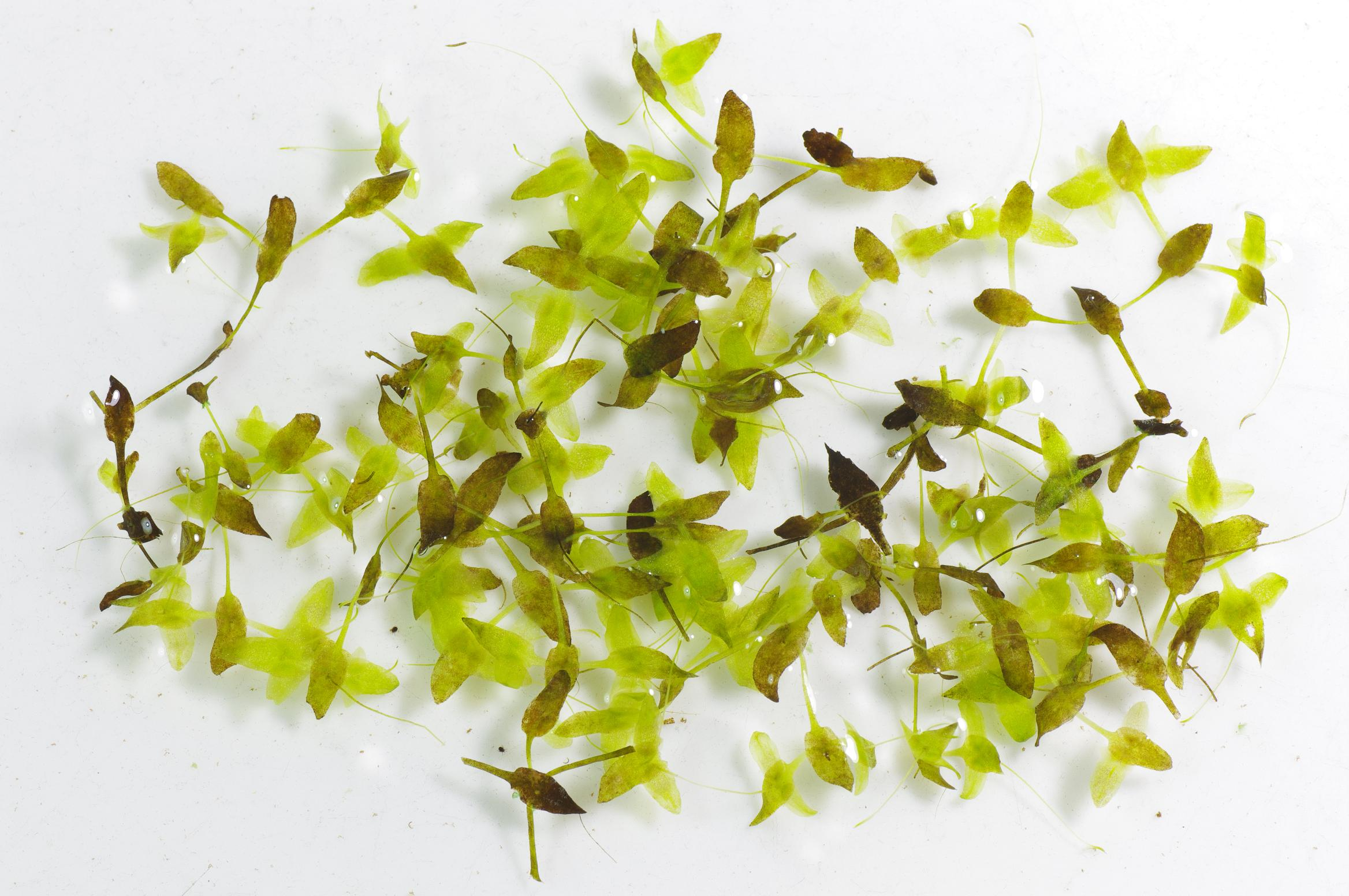
Ivy Duckweed (Lemna trisulca)

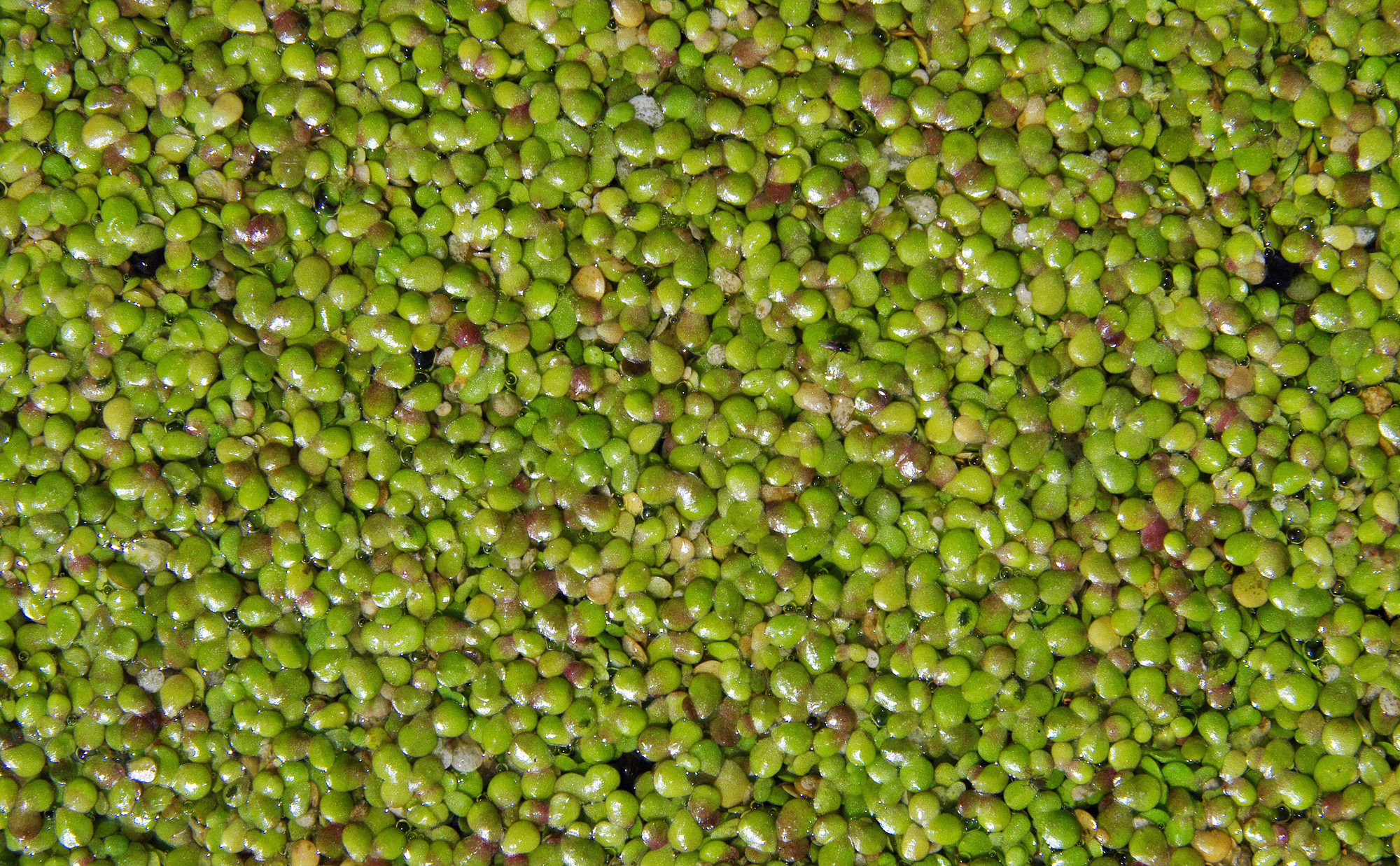
Gibbous Duckweed (Lemna gibba)

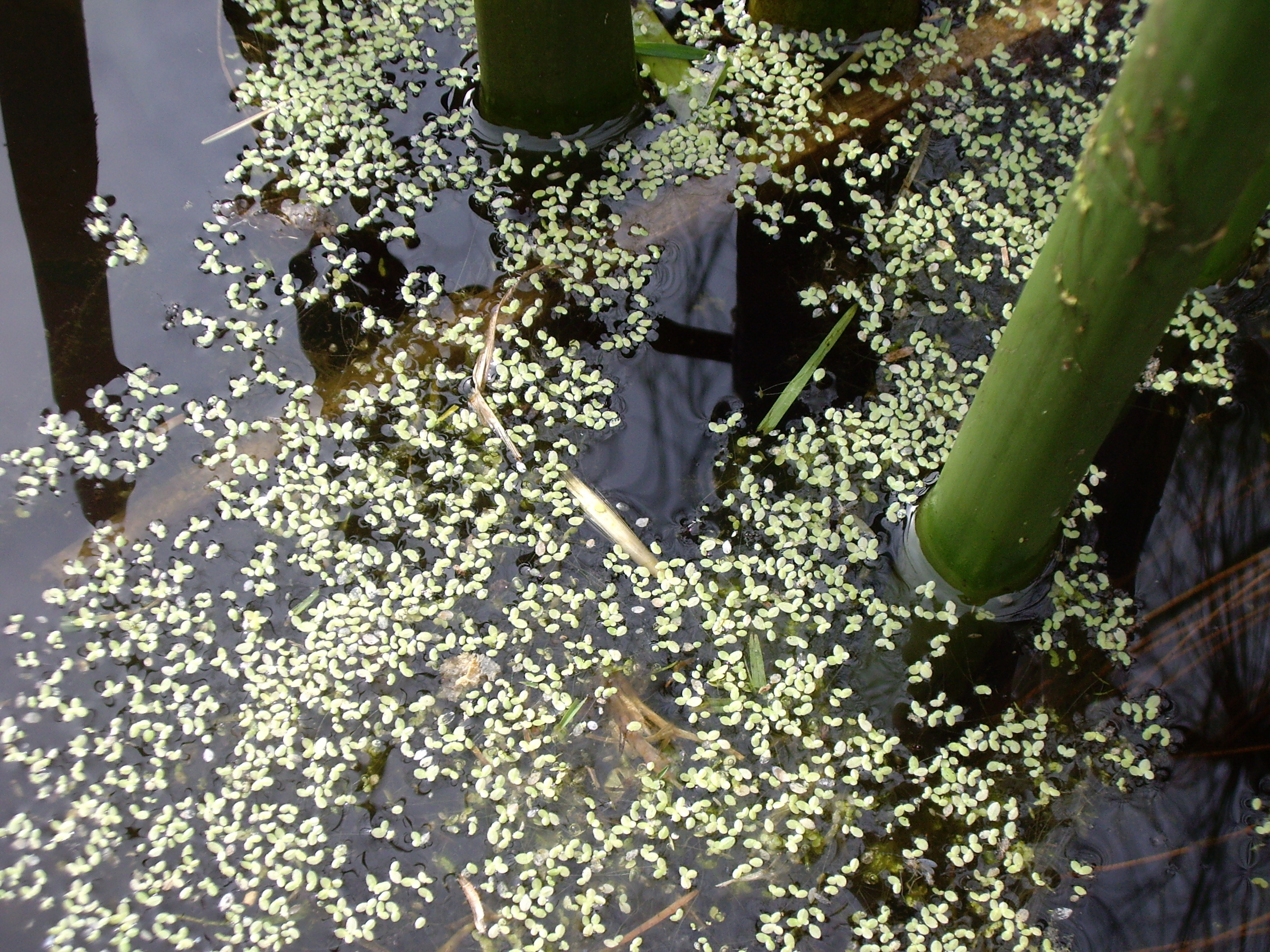
Common Duckweed (Lemna minor)
