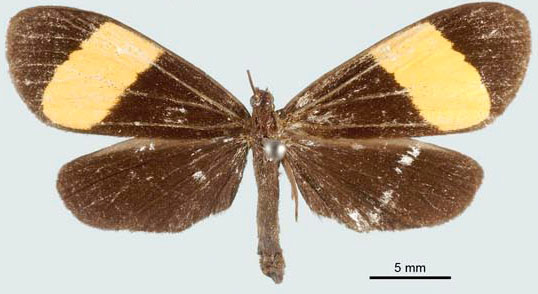

Scientific classification
- Kingdom: Animalia
- Phylum: Arthropoda
- Clade: Pancrustacea
- Class: Insecta
- Order: Lepidoptera
- Superfamily: Noctuoidea
- Family: Notodontidae
- Genus: Lyces
- Species: L. ignorata

Binomial name
- Lyces ignorata (Hering, 1925)

Synonyms
- Josia ignorata Hering, 1925

= Lyces ignorata =

Species of moth

Lyces ignorata is a moth of the family Notodontidae first described by Hering in 1925. It is probably endemic to Colombia.
