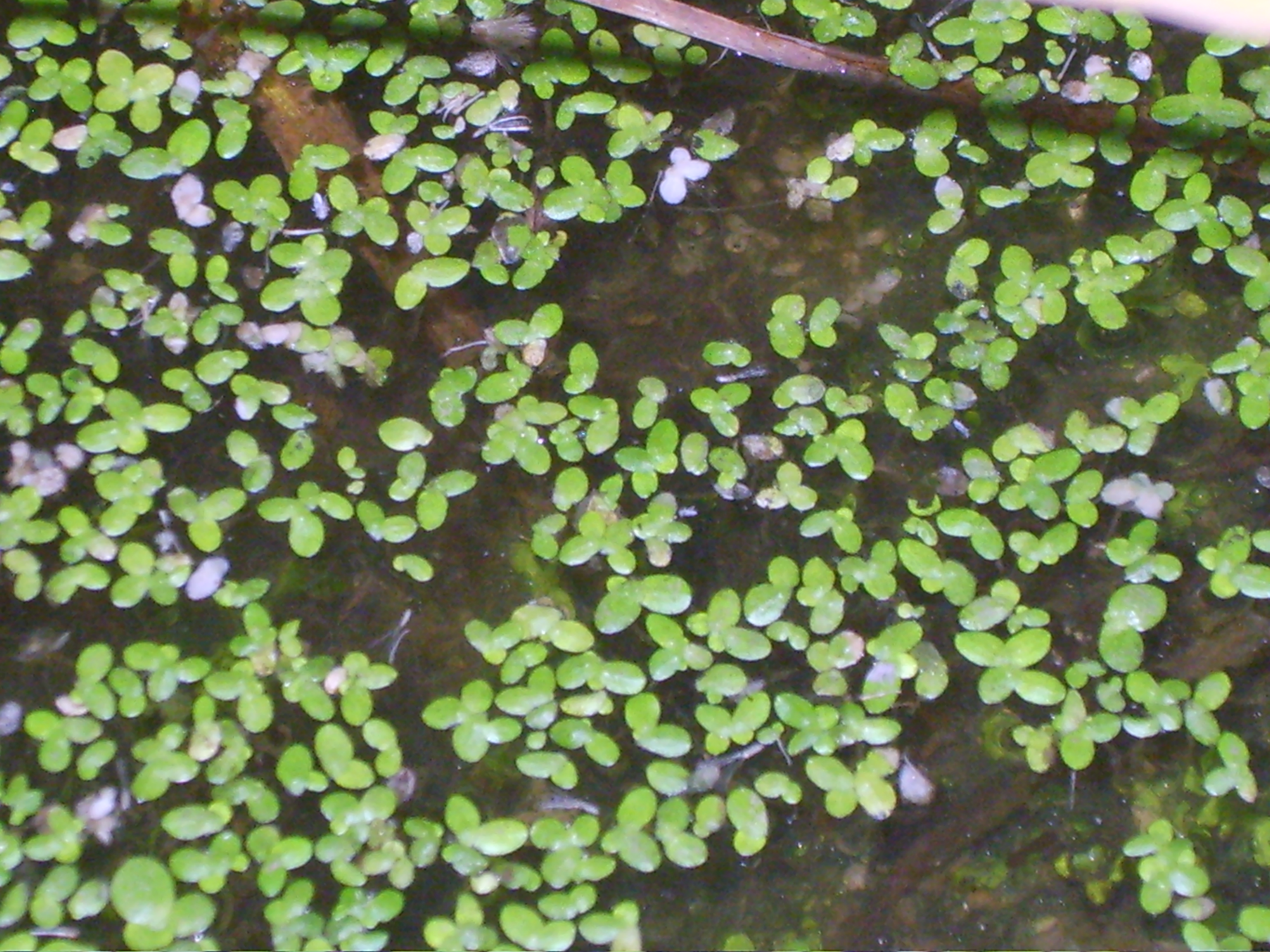
- Fronds, with some roots visible
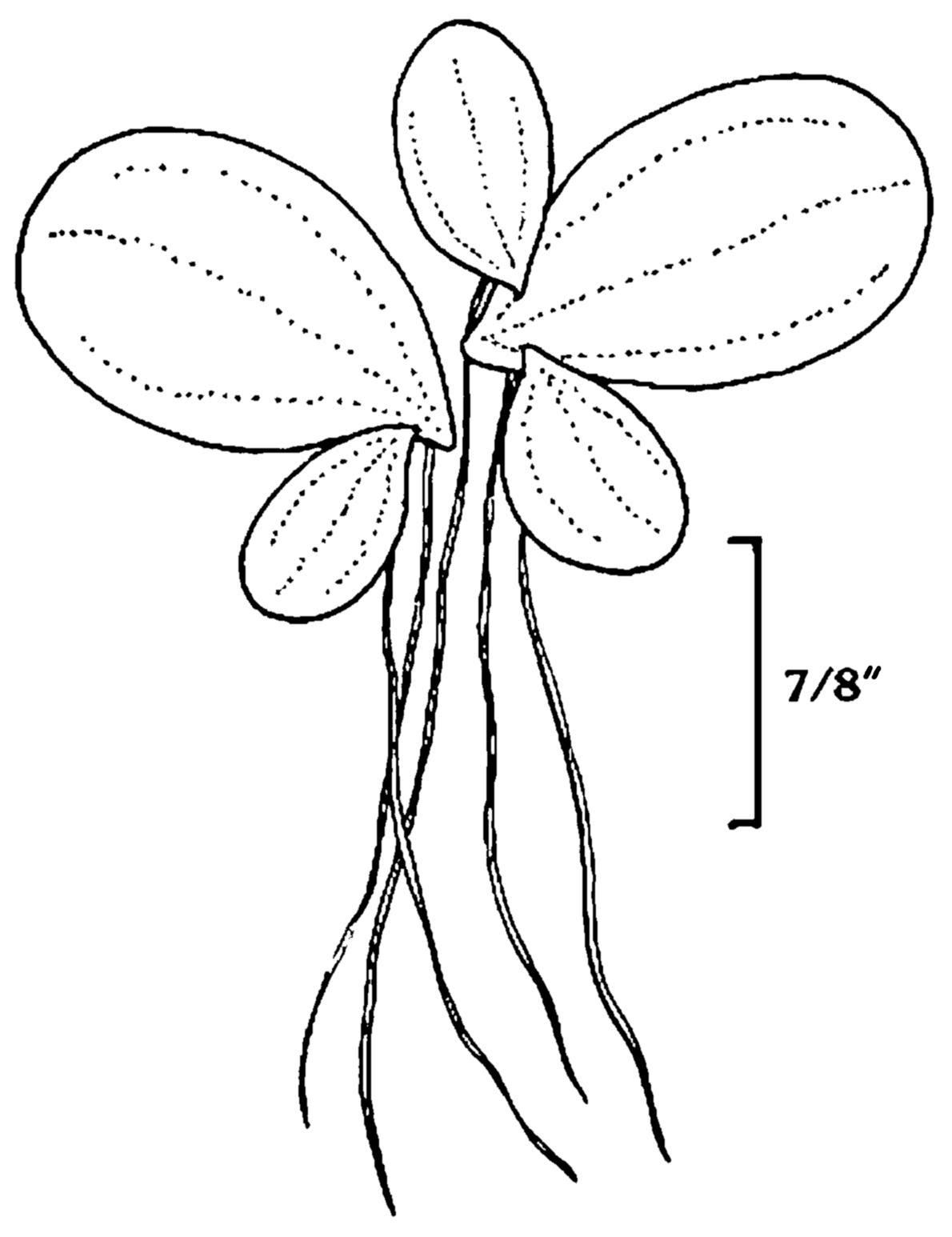
- Botanical illustration

Conservation status
- Least Concern (IUCN 3.1)

- Secure (NatureServe)

Scientific classification
- Kingdom: Plantae
- Clade: Tracheophytes
- Clade: Angiosperms
- Clade: Monocots
- Order: Alismatales
- Family: Araceae
- Genus: Lemna
- Species: L. perpusilla

Binomial name
- Lemna perpusilla Torr.

Synonyms
- Hydrophace perpusilla (Torr.) Lunell

= Lemna perpusilla =

Species of plant

Lemna perpusilla, the tiny duckweed or minute duckweed, is a species of aquatic flowering plant in the family Araceae. It is native to the central and eastern United States (but not the Deep South), and Quebec in Canada, and has been introduced to various locations around the world. It prefers still or very slowly moving waters.
