= Crocomela latimargo =

Scientific classification
- Kingdom: Animalia
- Phylum: Arthropoda
- Clade: Pancrustacea
- Class: Insecta
- Order: Lepidoptera
- Superfamily: Noctuoidea
- Family: Erebidae
- Subfamily: Arctiinae
- Genus: Crocomela
- Species: C. latimargo

Binomial name
- Crocomela latimargo (Dognin, 1912)

Synonyms
- Darna latimargo Dognin, 1912

Species of moth

Crocomela latimargo is a moth of the subfamily Arctiinae. It was described by Paul Dognin in 1912. It is found in Colombia.
