= Crocomela intensa =

Scientific classification
- Kingdom: Animalia
- Phylum: Arthropoda
- Class: Insecta
- Order: Lepidoptera
- Superfamily: Noctuoidea
- Family: Erebidae
- Subfamily: Arctiinae
- Genus: Crocomela
- Species: C. intensa

Binomial name
- Crocomela intensa (Walker, 1854)

Synonyms
- Chrysauge intensa Walker, 1854; Ephestris vitellina Herrich-Schäffer, [1855]; Darna marginata Warren, 1900

Species of moth

Crocomela intensa is a moth of the subfamily Arctiinae. It was described by Francis Walker in 1854. It is found in Venezuela.
