= Crocomela tenuifascia =

Scientific classification
- Domain: Eukaryota
- Kingdom: Animalia
- Phylum: Arthropoda
- Class: Insecta
- Order: Lepidoptera
- Superfamily: Noctuoidea
- Family: Erebidae
- Subfamily: Arctiinae
- Genus: Crocomela
- Species: C. tenuifascia

Binomial name
- Crocomela tenuifascia Hering, 1925

Species of moth

Crocomela tenuifascia is a moth of the subfamily Arctiinae. It was described by Hering in 1925. It is found in Ecuador.
