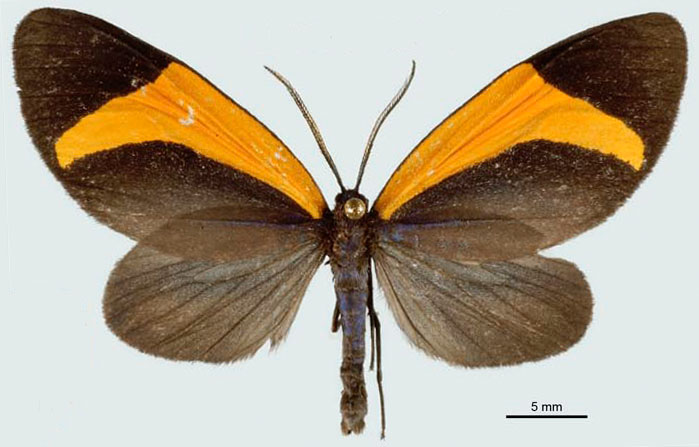

Scientific classification
- Domain: Eukaryota
- Kingdom: Animalia
- Phylum: Arthropoda
- Class: Insecta
- Order: Lepidoptera
- Superfamily: Noctuoidea
- Family: Erebidae
- Subfamily: Arctiinae
- Genus: Crocomela
- Species: C. flammifera

Binomial name
- Crocomela flammifera (Warren, 1904)

Synonyms
- Darna flammifera Warren, 1904; Darna praelata Warren, 1904; Crocomela orthocraspeda Hering, 1925

= Crocomela flammifera =

Species of moth

Crocomela flammifera is a moth of the subfamily Arctiinae first described by William Warren in 1904. It is found in Peru.

It is involved in Müllerian mimicry with Lyces vulturata.
