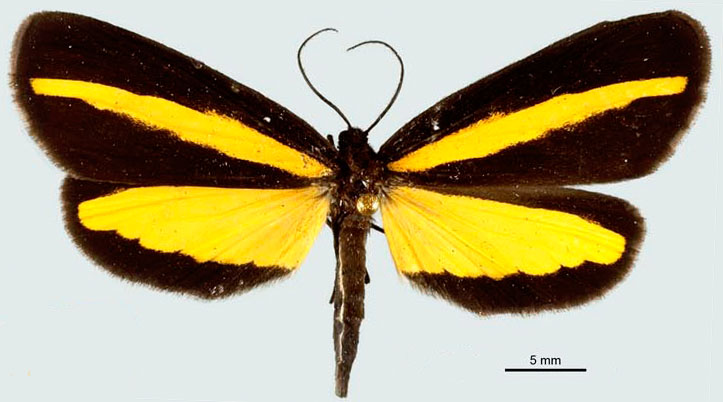

Scientific classification
- Kingdom: Animalia
- Phylum: Arthropoda
- Clade: Pancrustacea
- Class: Insecta
- Order: Lepidoptera
- Superfamily: Noctuoidea
- Family: Notodontidae
- Genus: Lyces
- Species: L. attenuata

Binomial name
- Lyces attenuata J. S. Miller, 2009

Synonyms
- Josia striata ab. attenuata Warren 1901

= Lyces attenuata =

Species of moth

Lyces attenuata is a moth of the family Notodontidae first described by James S. Miller in 2009. It is known almost exclusively from material collected by Anton Hermann Fassl in 1907 and 1908 in western Colombia.
