= Crocomela inca =

Scientific classification
- Domain: Eukaryota
- Kingdom: Animalia
- Phylum: Arthropoda
- Class: Insecta
- Order: Lepidoptera
- Superfamily: Noctuoidea
- Family: Erebidae
- Subfamily: Arctiinae
- Genus: Crocomela
- Species: C. inca

Binomial name
- Crocomela inca Schaus, 1892

Synonyms
- Darna inca Schaus, 1892; Crocomela minima Hering, 1925

Species of moth

Crocomela inca is a moth of the subfamily Arctiinae. It was described by William Schaus in 1892. It is found in Peru and Bolivia.
