= Crocomela regia =

Scientific classification
- Domain: Eukaryota
- Kingdom: Animalia
- Phylum: Arthropoda
- Class: Insecta
- Order: Lepidoptera
- Superfamily: Noctuoidea
- Family: Erebidae
- Subfamily: Arctiinae
- Genus: Crocomela
- Species: C. regia

Binomial name
- Crocomela regia (Warren, 1901)

Synonyms
- Darna regia Warren, 1901

Species of moth

Crocomela regia is a moth of the subfamily Arctiinae. It was described by William Warren in 1901. It is found in Ecuador.
