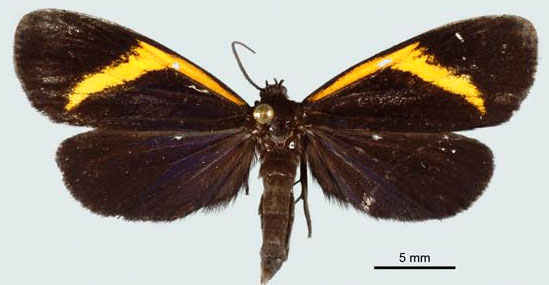

Scientific classification
- Kingdom: Animalia
- Phylum: Arthropoda
- Clade: Pancrustacea
- Class: Insecta
- Order: Lepidoptera
- Superfamily: Noctuoidea
- Family: Notodontidae
- Genus: Lyces
- Species: L. fluonia

Binomial name
- Lyces fluonia (H. Druce, 1885)

Synonyms
- Scea fluonia H. Druce, 1885

= Lyces fluonia =

Species of moth

Lyces fluonia is a moth of the family Notodontidae first described by Herbert Druce in 1885. It is found in the cloud forests of Ecuador and Peru.

Larvae have been reared on Passiflora mollissima.
