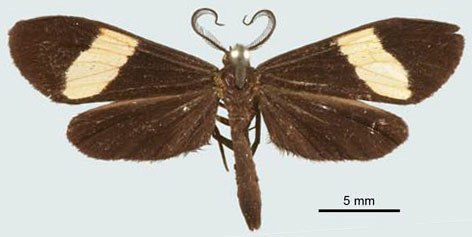

Scientific classification
- Kingdom: Animalia
- Phylum: Arthropoda
- Clade: Pancrustacea
- Class: Insecta
- Order: Lepidoptera
- Superfamily: Noctuoidea
- Family: Notodontidae
- Genus: Lyces
- Species: L. enoides

Binomial name
- Lyces enoides Boisduval, 1870

= Lyces enoides =

Species of moth

Lyces enoides is a moth of the family Notodontidae first described by Jean Baptiste Boisduval in 1870. It is found in Honduras and Mexico.
