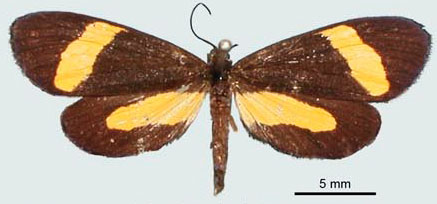

Scientific classification
- Kingdom: Animalia
- Phylum: Arthropoda
- Clade: Pancrustacea
- Class: Insecta
- Order: Lepidoptera
- Superfamily: Noctuoidea
- Family: Notodontidae
- Genus: Lyces
- Species: L. latistriga

Binomial name
- Lyces latistriga (Hering, 1925)

Synonyms
- Josia latistriga Hering, 1925

= Lyces latistriga =

Species of moth

Lyces latistriga is a moth of the family Notodontidae first described by Hering in 1925. It is only known from the Andean foothills of south-eastern Peru.
