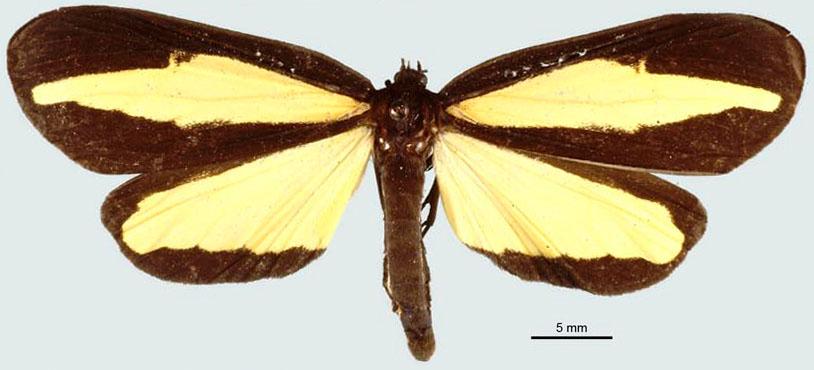

Scientific classification
- Kingdom: Animalia
- Phylum: Arthropoda
- Clade: Pancrustacea
- Class: Insecta
- Order: Lepidoptera
- Superfamily: Noctuoidea
- Family: Notodontidae
- Genus: Lyces
- Species: L. andosa

Binomial name
- Lyces andosa (H. Druce, 1911)

Synonyms
- Josia andosa H. Druce, 1911

= Lyces andosa =

Species of moth

Lyces andosa is a moth of the family Notodontidae first described by Herbert Druce in 1911. It is found on the Pacific slope of north-western Colombia.
