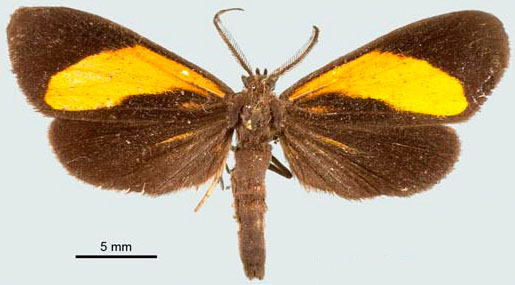

Scientific classification
- Kingdom: Animalia
- Phylum: Arthropoda
- Clade: Pancrustacea
- Class: Insecta
- Order: Lepidoptera
- Superfamily: Noctuoidea
- Family: Notodontidae
- Genus: Lyces
- Species: L. banana

Binomial name
- Lyces banana (Warren, 1901)

Synonyms
- Josia banana Warren, 1901

= Lyces banana =

Species of moth

Lyces banana is a moth of the family Notodontidae first described by William Warren in 1901. It is known from only seven specimens collected in Brazil more than 100 years ago.
