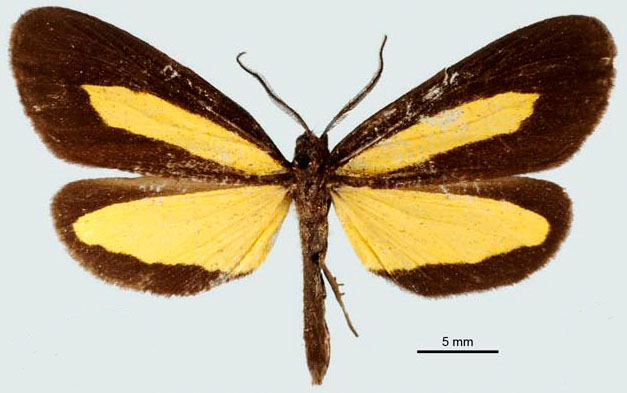

Scientific classification
- Kingdom: Animalia
- Phylum: Arthropoda
- Clade: Pancrustacea
- Class: Insecta
- Order: Lepidoptera
- Superfamily: Noctuoidea
- Family: Notodontidae
- Genus: Lyces
- Species: L. patula

Binomial name
- Lyces patula (Walker, 1864)

Synonyms
- Josia patula Walker, 1864; Smicropus consepta Dognin, 1913

= Lyces patula =

Species of moth

Lyces patula is a moth of the family Notodontidae first described by Francis Walker in 1864. It is endemic to montane central Colombia.
