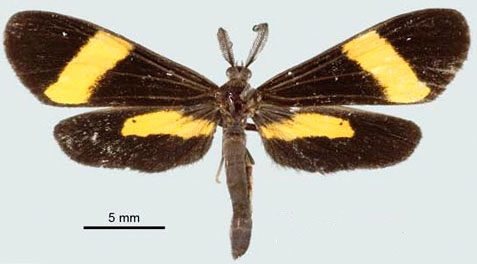
- An example of the moth Lyces aricaca.

Scientific classification
- Kingdom: Animalia
- Phylum: Arthropoda
- Clade: Pancrustacea
- Class: Insecta
- Order: Lepidoptera
- Superfamily: Noctuoidea
- Family: Notodontidae
- Genus: Lyces
- Species: L. ariaca

Binomial name
- Lyces ariaca (H. Druce, 1885)

Synonyms
- Ephialtias ariaca H. Druce, 1885; Ephialtias coatapeca Schaus, 1889

= Lyces ariaca =

Species of moth of the family Notodontidae

Lyces ariaca is a moth of the family Notodontidae first described by Herbert Druce in 1885. It is found from southern Mexico to Honduras.
