= Crocomela unifasciata =

Scientific classification
- Domain: Eukaryota
- Kingdom: Animalia
- Phylum: Arthropoda
- Class: Insecta
- Order: Lepidoptera
- Superfamily: Noctuoidea
- Family: Erebidae
- Subfamily: Arctiinae
- Genus: Crocomela
- Species: C. unifasciata

Binomial name
- Crocomela unifasciata (H. Druce, 1885)

Synonyms
- Darna unifasciata H. Druce, 1885; Euchlaenidia mamerta Schaus, 1933

Species of moth

Crocomela unifasciata is a moth of the subfamily Arctiinae. It was described by Herbert Druce in 1885. It is found in Ecuador.
