= Crocomela theophrastus =

Scientific classification
- Domain: Eukaryota
- Kingdom: Animalia
- Phylum: Arthropoda
- Class: Insecta
- Order: Lepidoptera
- Superfamily: Noctuoidea
- Family: Erebidae
- Subfamily: Arctiinae
- Genus: Crocomela
- Species: C. theophrastus

Binomial name
- Crocomela theophrastus Hering, 1926

Species of moth

Crocomela theophrastus is a moth of the subfamily Arctiinae. It was described by Hering in 1926. It is found in Brazil.
