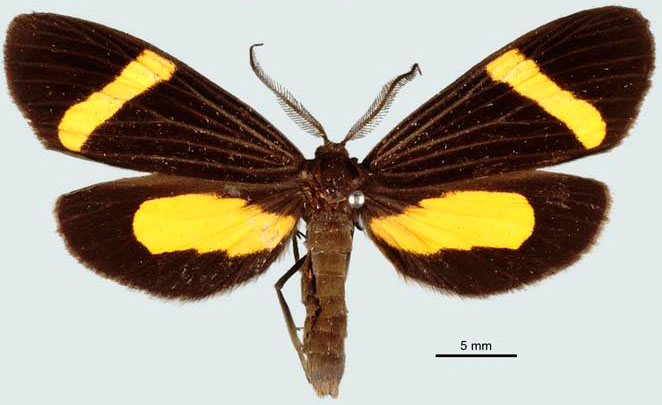
- Lyces angulosa

Scientific classification
- Kingdom: Animalia
- Phylum: Arthropoda
- Clade: Pancrustacea
- Class: Insecta
- Order: Lepidoptera
- Superfamily: Noctuoidea
- Family: Notodontidae
- Tribe: Josiini
- Genus: Lyces; Walker, 1854

= Lyces =

Genus of moths

Lyces is a genus of moths of the family Notodontidae erected by Francis Walker in 1854. It consists of the following species:

- Lyces andosa (Druce, 1911)
- Lyces angulosa Walker, 1854
- Lyces annulata (Dognin, 1909)
- Lyces ariaca (Druce, 1885)
- Lyces attenuata J.S. Miller, 2009
- Lyces aurimutua Walker, 1854
- Lyces banana (Warren, 1901)
- Lyces constricta (Warren, 1901)
- Lyces cruciata (Butler, 1875)
- Lyces ena (Boisduval, 1870)
- Lyces enoides Boisduval, 1870
- Lyces eterusialis Walker, 1864
- Lyces flavissima Walker, 1854
- Lyces fluonia (Druce, 1885)
- Lyces fornax Druce, 1885
- Lyces gopala (Dognin, 1891)
- Lyces ignorata (Hering, 1925)
- Lyces latistriga (Hering, 1925)
- Lyces longistria (Warren, 1904)
- Lyces minuta (Druce, 1885)
- Lyces patula (Walker, 1864)
- Lyces solaris (Schaus, 1892)
- Lyces striata (Druce, 1885)
- Lyces tamara (Hering, 1925)
- Lyces vulturata (Warren, 1904)
