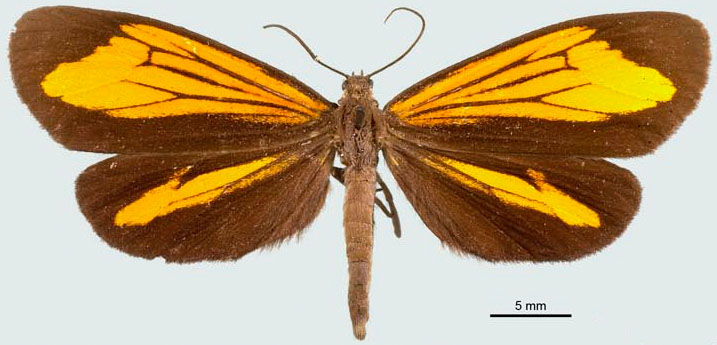

Scientific classification
- Kingdom: Animalia
- Phylum: Arthropoda
- Clade: Pancrustacea
- Class: Insecta
- Order: Lepidoptera
- Superfamily: Noctuoidea
- Family: Notodontidae
- Genus: Lyces
- Species: L. solaris

Binomial name
- Lyces solaris (Schaus, 1892)

Synonyms
- Scea solaris Schaus, 1892

= Lyces solaris =

Species of moth

Lyces solaris is a moth of the family Notodontidae first described by William Schaus in 1892. It is known from Peru, Bolivia and Argentina.
