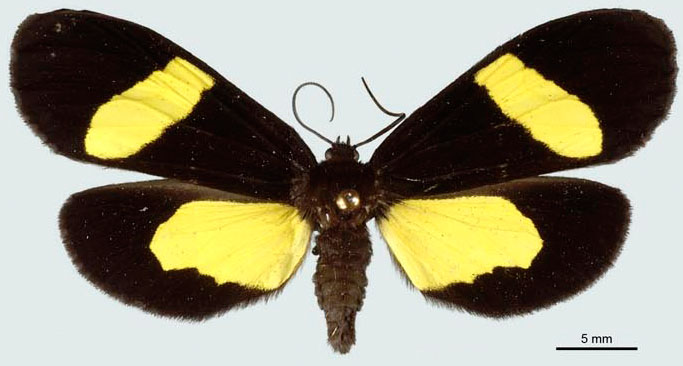

Scientific classification
- Kingdom: Animalia
- Phylum: Arthropoda
- Clade: Pancrustacea
- Class: Insecta
- Order: Lepidoptera
- Superfamily: Noctuoidea
- Family: Notodontidae
- Genus: Lyces
- Species: L. flavissima

Binomial name
- Lyces flavissima Walker, 1854

Synonyms
- Erilyces flavissima (Walker, 1854)

= Lyces flavissima =

Species of moth

Lyces flavissima is a moth of the family Notodontidae first described by Francis Walker in 1854. It is found from eastern Ecuador to the Guianas.

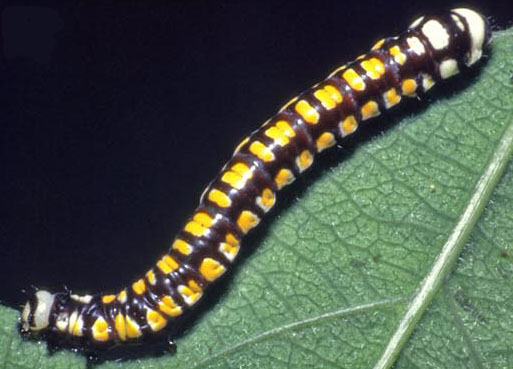
Larva

Larvae have been reared on Passiflora ambigua.
