= Crocomela abadesa =

Scientific classification
- Domain: Eukaryota
- Kingdom: Animalia
- Phylum: Arthropoda
- Class: Insecta
- Order: Lepidoptera
- Superfamily: Noctuoidea
- Family: Erebidae
- Subfamily: Arctiinae
- Genus: Crocomela
- Species: C. abadesa

Binomial name
- Crocomela abadesa (Dognin, 1900)

Synonyms
- Darna abadesa Dognin, 1900

Species of moth

Crocomela abadesa is a moth of the subfamily Arctiinae. It was described by Paul Dognin in 1900. It is found in Colombia.
