= Crocomela rubriplaga =

Scientific classification
- Domain: Eukaryota
- Kingdom: Animalia
- Phylum: Arthropoda
- Class: Insecta
- Order: Lepidoptera
- Superfamily: Noctuoidea
- Family: Erebidae
- Subfamily: Arctiinae
- Genus: Crocomela
- Species: C. rubriplaga

Binomial name
- Crocomela rubriplaga (Warren, 1904)

Synonyms
- Darna rubriplaga Warren, 1904

Species of moth

Crocomela rubriplaga is a moth of the subfamily Arctiinae. It was described by William Warren in 1904. It is found in Ecuador.
