= Crocomela tripunctata =

Scientific classification
- Domain: Eukaryota
- Kingdom: Animalia
- Phylum: Arthropoda
- Class: Insecta
- Order: Lepidoptera
- Superfamily: Noctuoidea
- Family: Erebidae
- Subfamily: Arctiinae
- Genus: Crocomela
- Species: C. tripunctata

Binomial name
- Crocomela tripunctata (H. Druce, 1885)

Synonyms
- Darna tripunctata H. Druce, 1885

Species of moth

Crocomela tripunctata is a moth of the subfamily Arctiinae. It was described by Herbert Druce in 1885. It is found in Ecuador.
