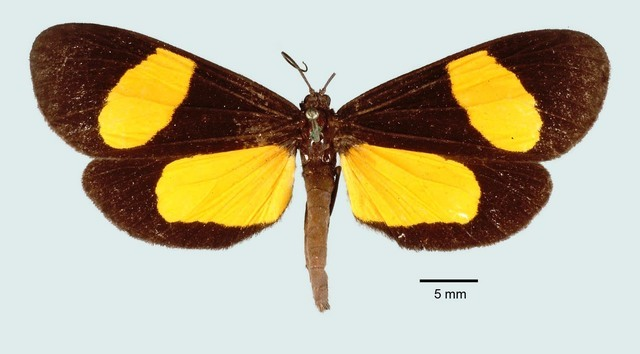

Scientific classification
- Kingdom: Animalia
- Phylum: Arthropoda
- Clade: Pancrustacea
- Class: Insecta
- Order: Lepidoptera
- Superfamily: Noctuoidea
- Family: Notodontidae
- Genus: Lyces
- Species: L. eterusialis

Binomial name
- Lyces eterusialis Walker, 1864

= Lyces eterusialis =

Species of moth

Lyces eterusialis is a moth of the family Notodontidae first described by Francis Walker in 1864. It is found on the slopes of the Andes east of Bogotá, Colombia.
