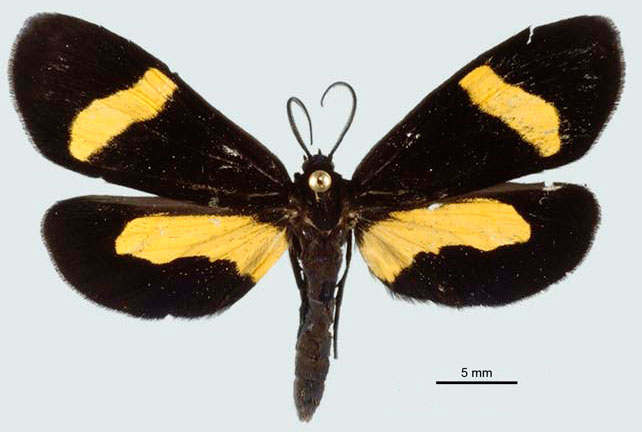

Scientific classification
- Kingdom: Animalia
- Phylum: Arthropoda
- Clade: Pancrustacea
- Class: Insecta
- Order: Lepidoptera
- Superfamily: Noctuoidea
- Family: Notodontidae
- Genus: Lyces
- Species: L. fornax

Binomial name
- Lyces fornax H. Druce, 1885

Synonyms
- Ephialtias latimargo Warren, 1904; Ephialtias aperta Warren, 1905

= Lyces fornax =

Species of moth

Lyces fornax is a moth of the family Notodontidae first described by Herbert Druce in 1885. It is found at mid-elevations on the eastern slopes of the Andes from Ecuador to Bolivia.

Larvae have been reared on Passiflora ligularis.
