= Crocomela luxuriosa =

Scientific classification
- Domain: Eukaryota
- Kingdom: Animalia
- Phylum: Arthropoda
- Class: Insecta
- Order: Lepidoptera
- Superfamily: Noctuoidea
- Family: Erebidae
- Subfamily: Arctiinae
- Genus: Crocomela
- Species: C. luxuriosa

Binomial name
- Crocomela luxuriosa Hering, 1925

Species of moth

Crocomela luxuriosa is a moth of the subfamily Arctiinae. It was described by Hering in 1925. It is found in Colombia.
