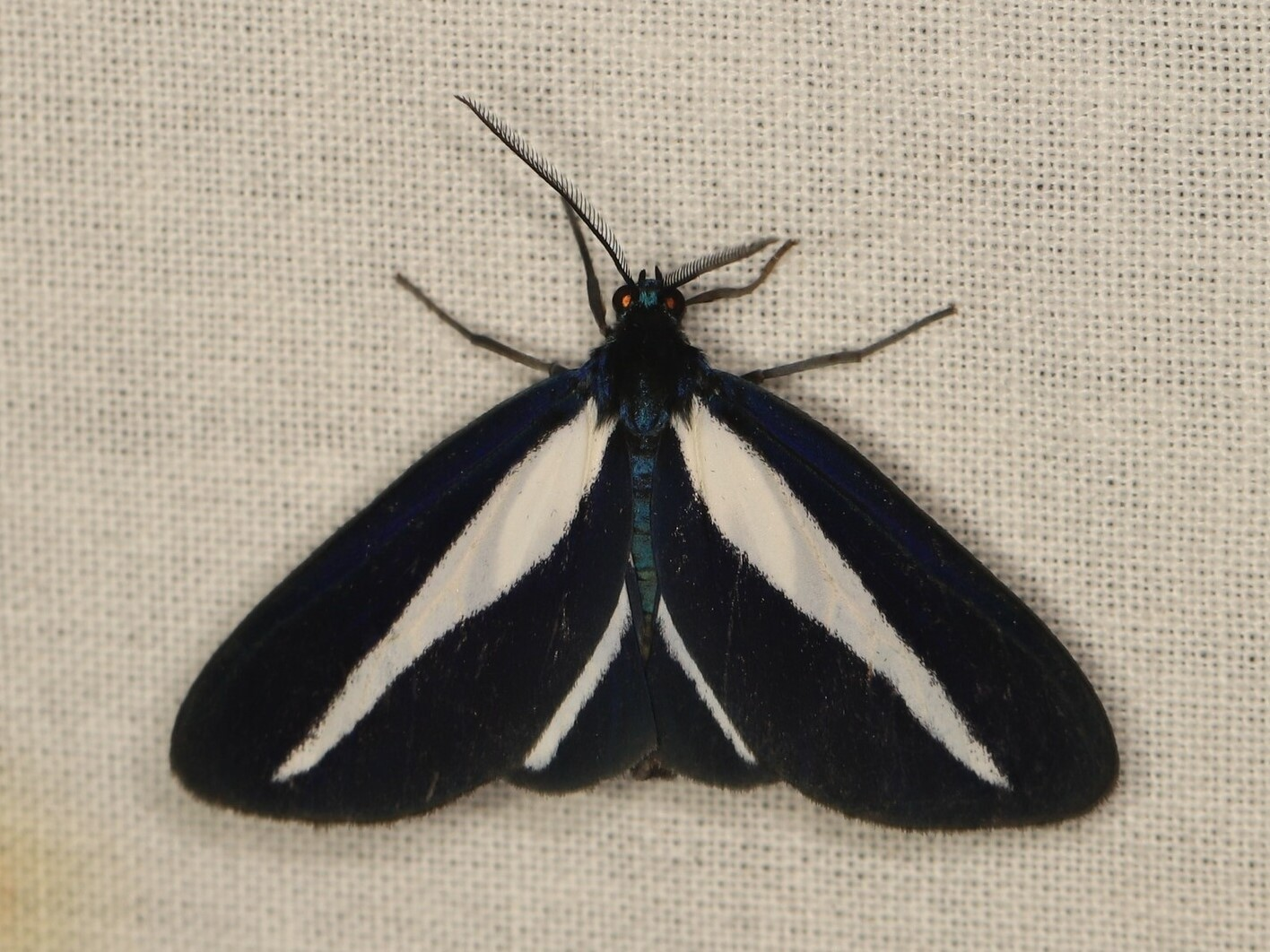

Scientific classification
- Domain: Eukaryota
- Kingdom: Animalia
- Phylum: Arthropoda
- Class: Insecta
- Order: Lepidoptera
- Superfamily: Noctuoidea
- Family: Erebidae
- Subfamily: Arctiinae
- Genus: Crocomela
- Species: C. albolineata

Binomial name
- Crocomela albolineata (H. Druce, 1911)

Synonyms
- Josiomorpha albolineata H. Druce, 1911

= Crocomela albolineata =

Species of insect

Crocomela albolineata is a species of moth in the subfamily Arctiinae. It was described by Herbert Druce in 1911. It is found in Colombia and northern Ecuador.
