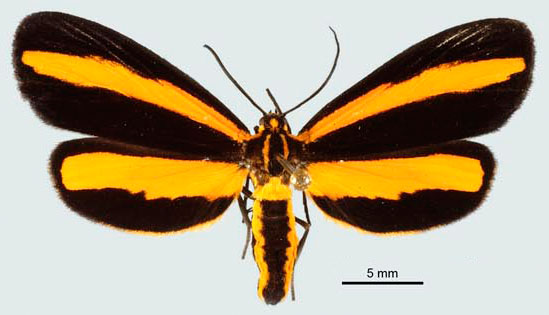

Scientific classification
- Kingdom: Animalia
- Phylum: Arthropoda
- Clade: Pancrustacea
- Class: Insecta
- Order: Lepidoptera
- Superfamily: Noctuoidea
- Family: Notodontidae
- Genus: Lyces
- Species: L. cruciata

Binomial name
- Lyces cruciata (Butler, 1875)

Synonyms
- Josia cruciata Butler, 1875

= Lyces cruciata =

Species of moth

Lyces cruciata is a moth of the family Notodontidae first described by Arthur Gardiner Butler in 1875. It is found in Costa Rica and Panama.
