= Crocomela colorata =

Scientific classification
- Kingdom: Animalia
- Phylum: Arthropoda
- Class: Insecta
- Order: Lepidoptera
- Superfamily: Noctuoidea
- Family: Erebidae
- Subfamily: Arctiinae
- Genus: Crocomela
- Species: C. colorata

Binomial name
- Crocomela colorata (Walker, 1865)

Synonyms
- Darna colorata Walker, [1865]; Crocomela splendida Bryk, 1953

Species of moth

Crocomela colorata is a moth of the subfamily Arctiinae. It was described by Francis Walker in 1865. It is found in Colombia and Peru.

== Subspecies ==
- Crocomela colorata colorata (Colombia)
- Crocomela colorata splendida Bryk, 1953 (Peru)
