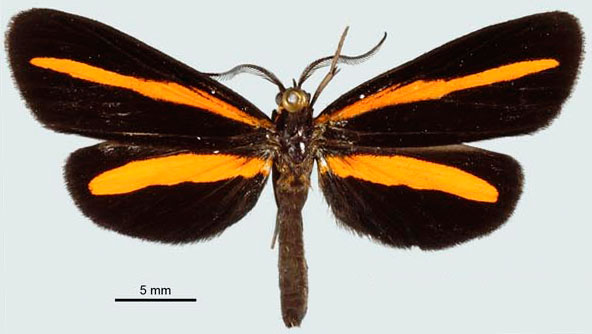

Scientific classification
- Kingdom: Animalia
- Phylum: Arthropoda
- Clade: Pancrustacea
- Class: Insecta
- Order: Lepidoptera
- Superfamily: Noctuoidea
- Family: Notodontidae
- Genus: Lyces
- Species: L. aurimutua

Binomial name
- Lyces aurimutua Walker, 1854

Synonyms
- Bombyx jesuita Fabricius, 1787 (invalid - nomen oblitum); Josia fulvia Hübner, 1822

= Lyces aurimutua =

Species of moth

Lyces aurimutua is a moth of the family Notodontidae first described by Francis Walker in 1854. It is endemic to the Atlantic coastal forest of Brazil.
