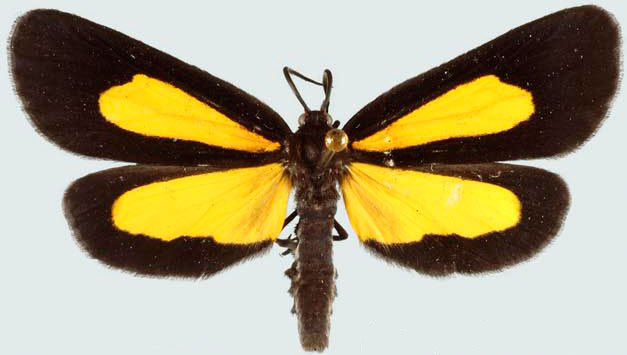

Scientific classification
- Kingdom: Animalia
- Phylum: Arthropoda
- Clade: Pancrustacea
- Class: Insecta
- Order: Lepidoptera
- Superfamily: Noctuoidea
- Family: Notodontidae
- Genus: Lyces
- Species: L. gopala

Binomial name
- Lyces gopala (Dognin, 1891)

Synonyms
- Josia gopala (Dognin, 1891); Flavinia gopala Dognin, 1891

= Lyces gopala =

Species of moth

Lyces gopala is a moth of the family Notodontidae first described by Paul Dognin in 1891. It is endemic to the state of Mérida in the mountains of western Venezuela.

The larvae feed on Passiflora species, including Passiflora cuneata and Passiflora gritensis.
