= Crocomela conscita =

Scientific classification
- Domain: Eukaryota
- Kingdom: Animalia
- Phylum: Arthropoda
- Class: Insecta
- Order: Lepidoptera
- Superfamily: Noctuoidea
- Family: Erebidae
- Subfamily: Arctiinae
- Genus: Crocomela
- Species: C. conscita

Binomial name
- Crocomela conscita (H. Druce, 1903)

Synonyms
- Darna conscita H. Druce, 1903; Darna volitans Warren, 1904; Darna trigonata Warren, 1907

Species of moth

Crocomela conscita is a moth of the subfamily Arctiinae. It was described by Herbert Druce in 1903. It is found in Peru.
