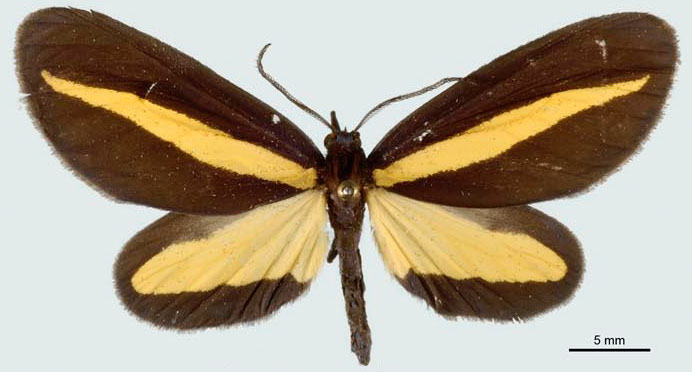
- Crocomela erectistria

Scientific classification
- Domain: Eukaryota
- Kingdom: Animalia
- Phylum: Arthropoda
- Class: Insecta
- Order: Lepidoptera
- Superfamily: Noctuoidea
- Family: Erebidae
- Subfamily: Arctiinae
- Genus: Crocomela; Kirby, 1892

Synonyms
- Darna Walker, [1865] (preocc. Walker, 1862)

= Crocomela =

Genus of moths

Crocomela is a genus of moths in the subfamily Arctiinae. The genus was described by William Forsell Kirby in 1892.

== Species ==
- Crocomela abadesa Dognin, 1900
- Crocomela albolineata Druce, 1911
- Crocomela colorata Walker, 1865
- Crocomela conscita Druce, 1903
- Crocomela erectistria Warren, 1904
- Crocomela flammifera Warren, 1904
- Crocomela fusifera Walker, 1856
- Crocomela imperialis Druce, 1885
- Crocomela inca Schaus, 1892
- Crocomela intensa Walker, 1854
- Crocomela latimargo Dognin, 1912
- Crocomela luxuriosa Hering, 1925
- Crocomela maxima Druce, 1896
- Crocomela regia Warren, 1901
- Crocomela rubriplaga Warren, 1904
- Crocomela tenuifascia Hering, 1925
- Crocomela theophrastus Hering, 1926
- Crocomela tripunctata Druce, 1885
- Crocomela unifasciata Druce, 1885
