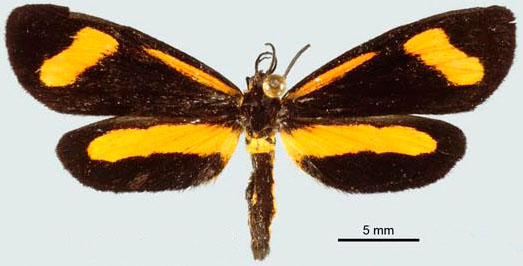

Scientific classification
- Kingdom: Animalia
- Phylum: Arthropoda
- Clade: Pancrustacea
- Class: Insecta
- Order: Lepidoptera
- Superfamily: Noctuoidea
- Family: Notodontidae
- Genus: Lyces
- Species: L. minuta

Binomial name
- Lyces minuta (H. Druce, 1885)

Synonyms
- Actea minuta H. Druce, 1885; Leptactea minuta (H. Druce, 1885)

= Lyces minuta =

Species of moth

Lyces minuta is a moth of the Notodontidae family first described by Herbert Druce in 1885. It is endemic to eastern Ecuador. It is recognizable by abdominal markings; a lateral orange stripe and a dorsal transverse orange band on A1.
