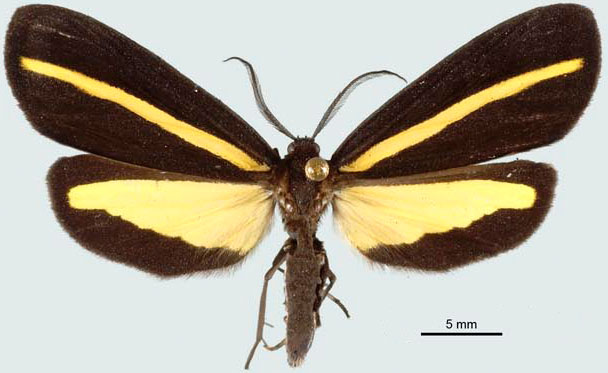

Scientific classification
- Kingdom: Animalia
- Phylum: Arthropoda
- Clade: Pancrustacea
- Class: Insecta
- Order: Lepidoptera
- Superfamily: Noctuoidea
- Family: Notodontidae
- Genus: Lyces
- Species: L. striata

Binomial name
- Lyces striata (H. Druce, 1885)

Synonyms
- Josia ampliflava Warren, 1901; Josia discipuncta Hering, 1928; Josia striata H. Druce, 1885

= Lyces striata =

Species of moth

Lyces striata is a moth of the family Notodontidae first described by Herbert Druce in 1885.
