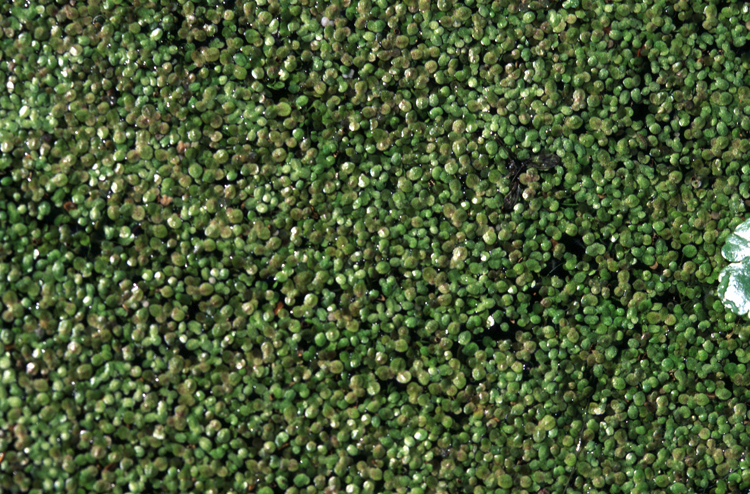

Conservation status
- Least Concern (IUCN 3.1)

- Apparently Secure (NatureServe)

Scientific classification
- Kingdom: Plantae
- Clade: Embryophytes
- Clade: Tracheophytes
- Clade: Spermatophytes
- Clade: Angiosperms
- Clade: Monocots
- Order: Alismatales
- Family: Araceae
- Genus: Lemna
- Species: L. minuta

Binomial name
- Lemna minuta Kunth

Synonyms
- Lemna minuscula

= Lemna minuta =

Species of flowering plant

Lemna minuta is a species of duckweed known by the common name least duckweed. It is the smallest Lemna species. It is native to parts of the Americas, and naturalized in others; the exact native range is not known. It is found on other continents as a non-native introduction as well. The plant's distribution is ever-expanding; it has been spreading in Europe and it was described from Poland for the first time in 2007. In many areas it is a noxious weed, such as in Belgium.

This tiny plant varies in shape depending on growth conditions. In the shade it is a single green translucent oval body no more than 2.5 millimeters long, and in full sunlight it generally grows in pairs. There is a central vein usually visible under magnification and microscopy. The plant produces an ephemeral membrane-bound flower.

This duckweed grows in slow-moving, calm, and stagnant freshwater habitats. It affects the ecology of its habitat by forming mats on the water surface, reducing sunlight penetration and oxygen exchange.
