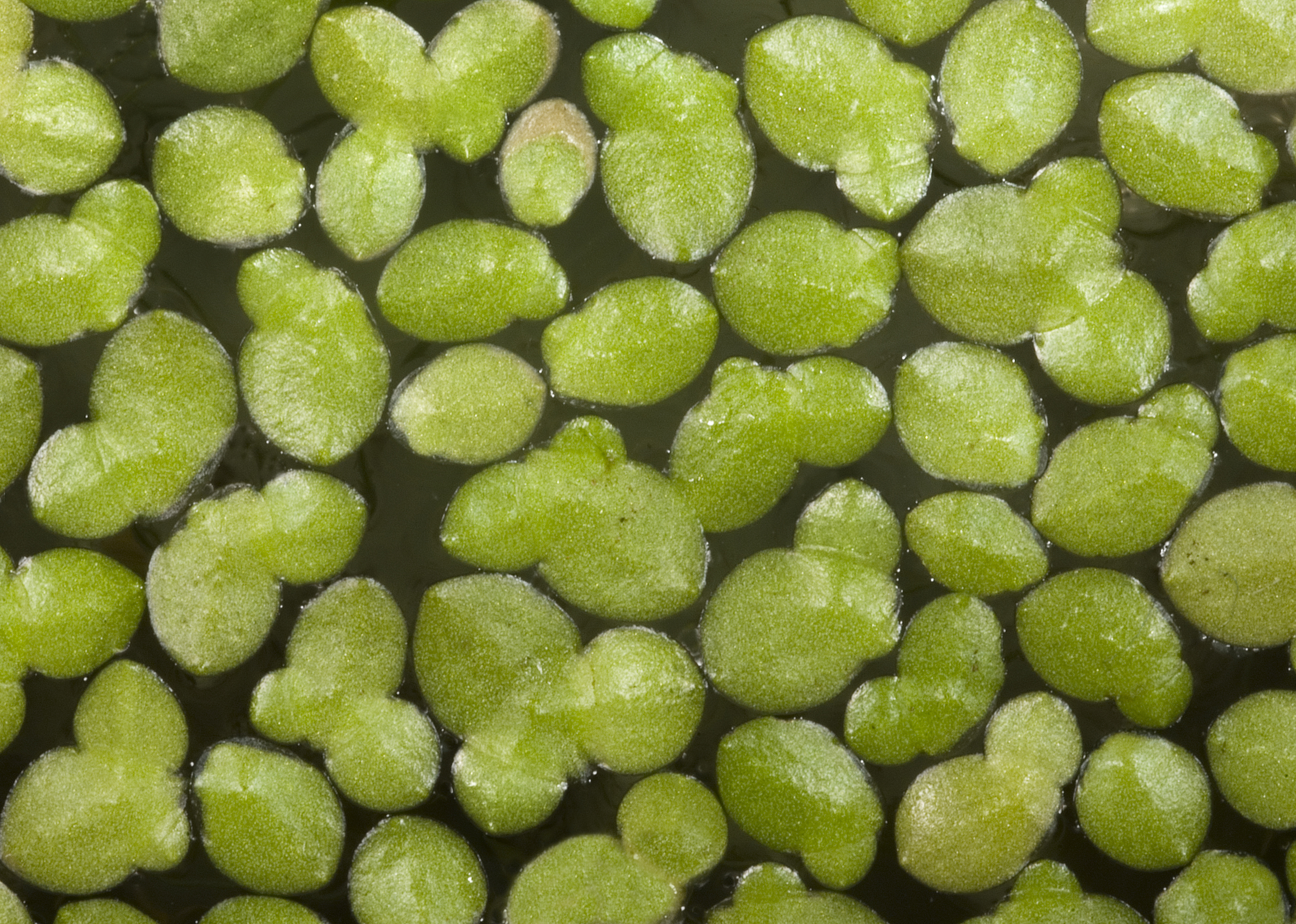

Conservation status
- Least Concern (IUCN 3.1)

Scientific classification
- Kingdom: Plantae
- Clade: Embryophytes
- Clade: Tracheophytes
- Clade: Spermatophytes
- Clade: Angiosperms
- Clade: Monocots
- Order: Alismatales
- Family: Araceae
- Genus: Lemna
- Species: L. aequinoctialis

Binomial name
- Lemna aequinoctialis Welw.

Synonyms
- Lemna paucicostata Hegelm.

= Lemna aequinoctialis =

Species of flowering plant

Lemna aequinoctialis, the lesser duckweed, is a tiny, floating aquatic plant in the aroid family, found in quiet, still waters of the Southern U.S., as well as Mexico and some Caribbean Islands. Additionally, it can be found from the state of Virginia south through Florida, north to Nebraska and even into southern Wisconsin. It is also widespread in the American Southwest (and most of Mexico, including desert), from Texas to the coast of California, preferring lagoons and still ponds, which it accesses via seasonal flooding and occasional precipitation. Fronds are generally triple-nerved, green, and measure up-to 6 mm long. Flowers are single-ovulate, with a small utricular scale open on one side. Seeds have 8–26 ribs.

Due to its fast growth and hardy nature as a floating plant, lesser duckweed has become quite prevalent in the aquarium hobby, where it is maligned by some aquarists, while valued by others for absorbing excess nutrients in the water and shading fish from overhead lighting; additionally, it can be a food source for herbivorous or omnivorous fish (like goldfish). With its ability to reproduce rapidly and absorb nutrients productively, Lemna has become established, and even invasive, in many regional waterways outside of its native distribution. Accidental release has spawned numerous colonies of the plant in Eurasia and Africa, as well as in South America and some islands of Oceania.
