= Passiflora monadelpha =

Conservation status
- Least Concern (IUCN 3.1)

Scientific classification
- Kingdom: Plantae
- Clade: Tracheophytes
- Clade: Angiosperms
- Clade: Eudicots
- Clade: Rosids
- Order: Malpighiales
- Family: Passifloraceae
- Genus: Passiflora
- Species: P. monadelpha

Binomial name
- Passiflora monadelpha P.Jørg. & Holm-Niels.

Species of vine

Passiflora monadelpha is a species of plant in the Passifloraceae family. It is endemic to Ecuador.
