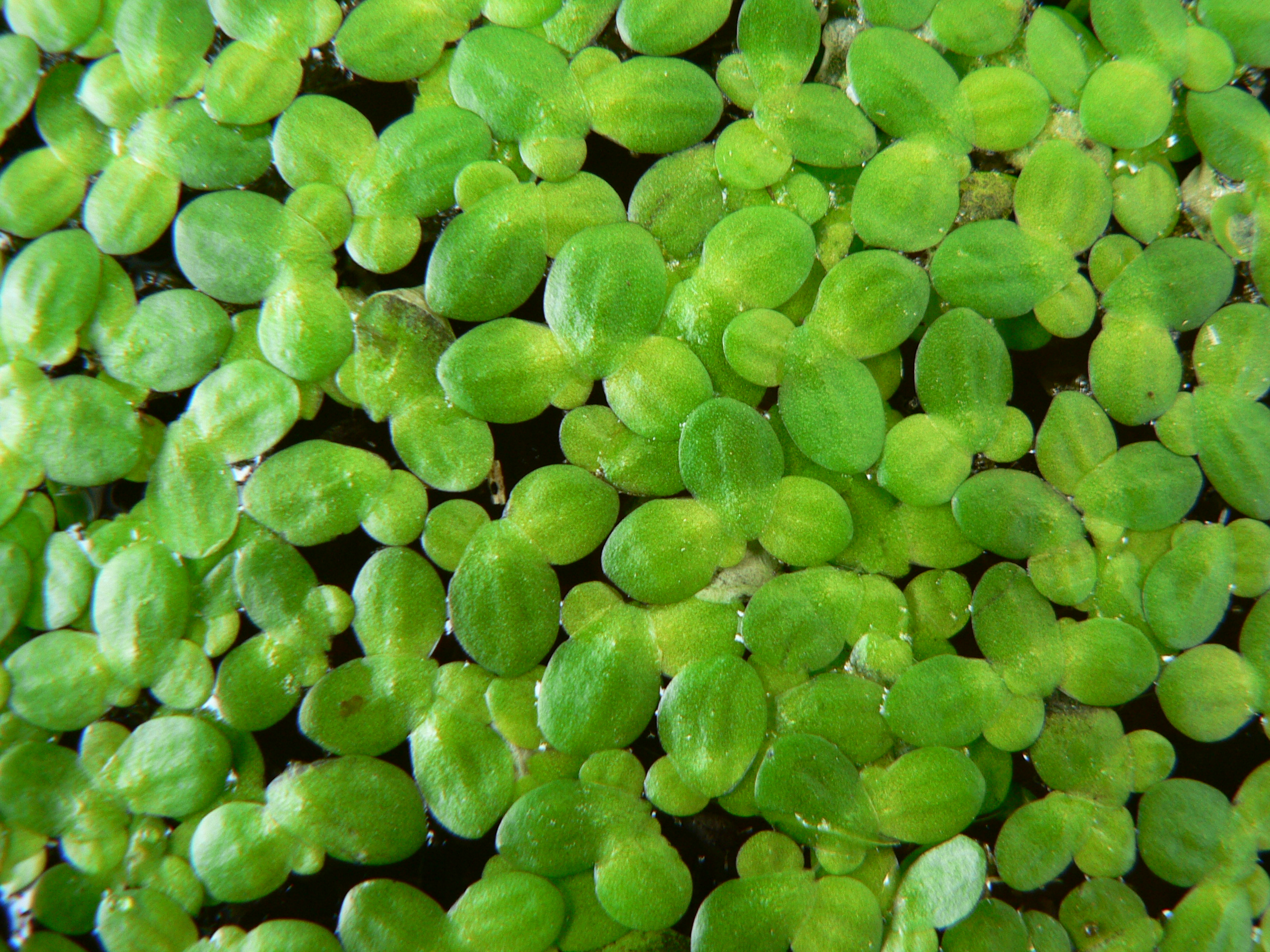

Conservation status
- Least Concern (IUCN 3.1)

Scientific classification
- Kingdom: Plantae
- Clade: Tracheophytes
- Clade: Angiosperms
- Clade: Monocots
- Order: Alismatales
- Family: Araceae
- Genus: Lemna
- Species: L. minor

Binomial name
- Lemna minor L.

= Lemna minor =

Species of flowering plant

Lemna minor, the common duckweed or lesser duckweed, is a species of aquatic freshwater plant in the subfamily Lemnoideae of the arum family Araceae. L. minor is used as animal fodder, bioremediator, for wastewater nutrient recovery, and other applications.

== Description ==
Lemna minor is a floating freshwater aquatic plant, with one, two, three or four leaves each having a single root hanging in the water. As more leaves grow, the plants divide and become separate individuals. The root is 1–2 cm long. Leaves are oval, 1–8 mm long and 0.6–5 mm broad, light green, with three (rarely five) veins and small air spaces that assist flotation. It reproduces mainly vegetatively by division. Flowers are rarely produced and measure about 1 mm in diameter, with a cup-shaped membranous scale containing a single ovule and two stamens. The seed is 1 mm long, ribbed with 8–15 ribs. Birds are important in dispersing L. minor to new sites. The sticky root enables the plant to adhere to the plumage or feet of birds and can thereby colonize new ponds.

== Distribution ==
Lemna minor has a subcosmopolitan distribution and is native throughout most of Africa, Asia, Europe and North America. It is present wherever freshwater ponds and slow-moving streams occur, except for arctic and subarctic climates. It is a neophyte in Australasia, naturalised there but not native.

== Cultivation ==
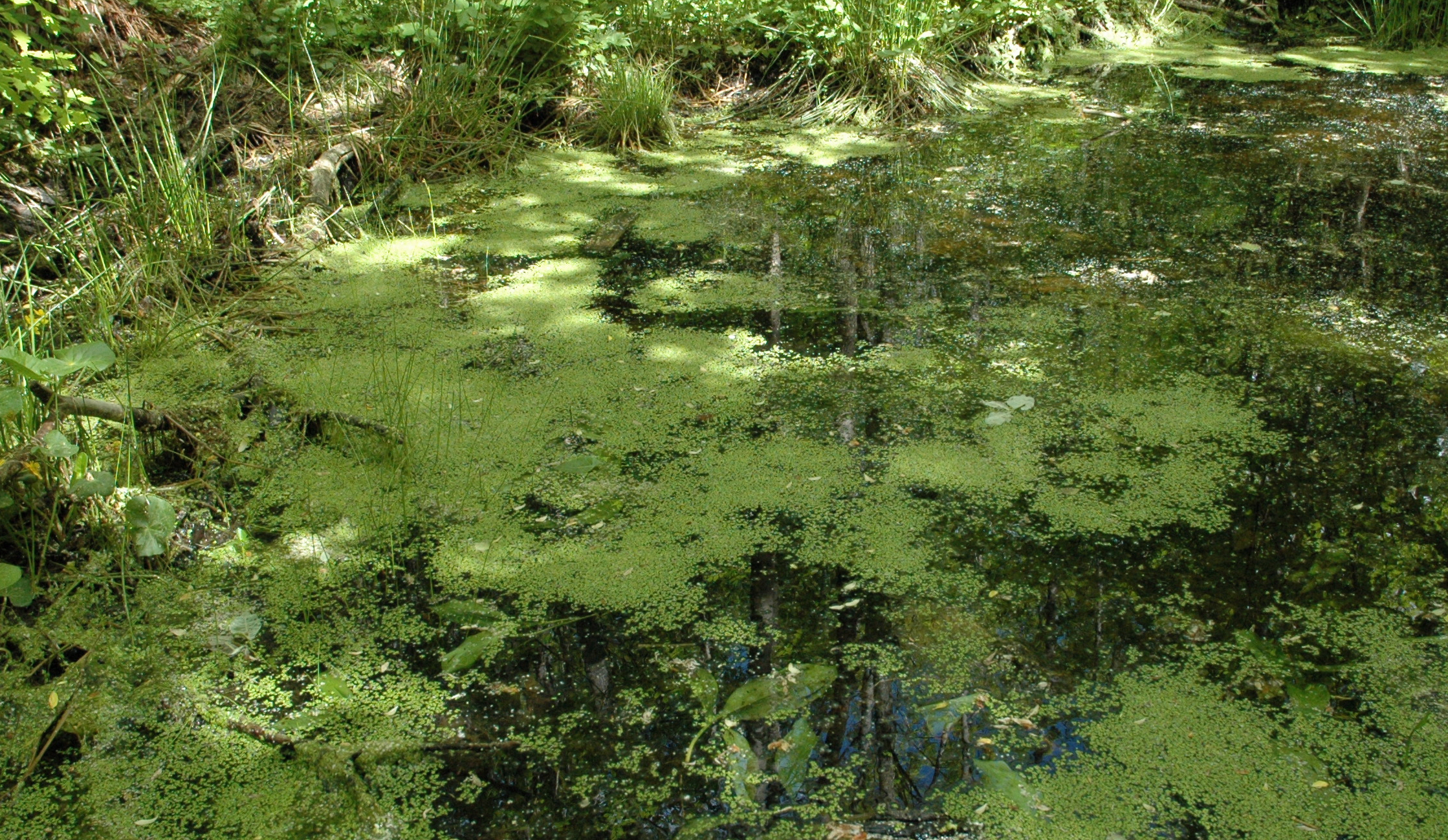
Colony on a small pool

For optimal growth conditions pH values between 6.5 and 8 are required. L. minor can grow at temperatures between 6 and 33 °C (43 and 91 °F). Growth of colonies is rapid, and the plants form a carpet covering still pools when conditions are suitable. In temperate regions, when temperatures drop below 6 to 7 °C (43 to 45 °F), small, dense, starch-filled organs called 'turions' are produced. The plants then become dormant and sink to the ground for overwintering. The following spring, they restart growing again and float back to the surface.

Duckweeds in general need some management effort to be cultivated. The small free floating plants are susceptible to being blown into heaps which results in open water surface allowing algal growth. For this reason, long narrow ponds running perpendicular to the prevailing wind are recommended. The equal distribution of added nutrients in the ponds can be achieved by several inlets. To maintain a dense cover of plants on the water surface and prevent a too thick layer for growth, coordinated harvesting and replenishment of nutrients are required.

The fertilizer requirements for growing duckweed depend on the water source and the geographic isolate of L. minor that is used. L. minor grown in ponds that are filled with rainwater, need an additional application of nitrogen, phosphorus and potassium. Total Kjeldahl nitrogen should not drop below 20–30 mg/L if high growth rates and crude protein contents are to be maintained. Regarding phosphorus, good growth has been reported in concentrations between 6 and 154 mg/L (there is no notable sensitivity for high phosphorus concentrations on growth rates). Effluents from domestic animal production have very high concentrations of ammonium and other minerals. They often need to be diluted to a balanced nutrient concentration. For the L. minor isolate 8627 cultivated in swine lagoon liquid, the best production rates were reached when grown in swine lagoon liquid diluted to 20% (total Kjeldahl nitrogen: 54 mg/L, ammonium: 31 mg/L, total phosphorus: 16 mg/L). Sewage water, which often has an adequate concentration of potassium and phosphorus, can be used to grow duckweed, but nitrogen concentrations need to be adjusted.

== Uses ==
=== Bioremediation ===
Lemna minor has been shown to remove heavy metals like lead, copper, zinc and arsenic very efficiently from waters with non-lethal concentrations. One particular study found that more than 70% of arsenic was removed after 15 days at initial concentration of 0.5 mg/L. Another one says that viable L. minor biomass removed 85–90% of Pb(NO_{3})_{2} with an initial concentration of 5 mg/L. Higher lead concentrations though result in a decrease in relative growth rate of L. minor. Because L. minor is temperature tolerant, shows rapid growth and is easy to harvest, it bears high potential for the cost-efficient use in wastewater treatments. The Devils Lake wastewater treatment, located in North Dakota, US, utilizes these beneficial properties of L. minor and other aquatic plants in the treatment of municipal and industrial wastewater. After a certain growing period, the plants are harvested and used as soil amendment, compost material or protein source for livestock. In industrial affected regions, where heavy metals accumulate in waters, soils and sediments due to anthropogenic activities like mining and burning of fossil fuels, the harvested L. minor should not be reused, but disposed accordingly. Because heavy metals have carcinogenic effects in humans, persist long in nature and accumulate in living organisms, their removal from the environment is important. Lemna minor has also been shown to remove organic micropollutants such as pharmaceuticals and benzotriazoles from wastewater.

=== Livestock feed ===
Depending on the literature, different yields of L. minor are registered. Grown under ideal conditions, yields up to 73 tonnes dry matter per hectare and year were recorded. Common duckweed has a high protein content varying from 20 to 40% depending on the season, the nutrient content of the water and environmental conditions. It does not build up very complex tissue structures and therefore has a low fiber content less than 5%. Basically all of its tissues can be used as fodder for fish and poultry and make duckweed an interesting food supplement.

Experimental investigations have shown that L. minor is able to completely replace the add-on of soy bean in the diet of ducks. It can be cultivated directly on the farm resulting in low production costs. Therefore, using common duckweed as a food supplement in broiler diets is very profitable also from an economic point of view. An investigation showed that expensive sesame oil cakes in chicken diets could partially be replaced by cheap L. minor with increased growth performance of broiler. Nevertheless, because of a lower content of digestible proteins in L. minor (68.9% compared to 89.9% in sesame oil cake), common duckweed could only be used as a food supplement in broiler diets. Also when feeding laying hens partially with dried L. minor (up to 150 g/kg fodder), they showed similar performance to when being fed with fish meal and rice polish, while the yolk colour was positively affected by the duckweed diet.

=== Wastewater nutrient recovery ===
Another application for Lemna minor is in nutrient recovery from livestock wastewater. This application is used in farming systems in southeast Asia, where manure and excrement are deposited in small eutrophic ponds. The water of those ponds then fertilizes bigger ponds on which L. minor is grown for the further use as fodder for ducks.

Growing selected geographic isolates of L. minor on diluted swine lagoon liquid in North Carolina resulted in yields up to 28.5 g m^{−2} day^{−1} (104.03 t ha^{−1} y^{−1}) and removal of over 85% of the total contained nitrogen and phosphorus.

Anaerobic pretreatment (e.g. through anaerobic digestion in a UASB) of the wastewater and dilution of the liquid to below 100 mg/L total Kjeldahl nitrogen and 50 mg/L total phosphorus, led to the best performance regarding growth and nutrient removal.

Cultivating L. minor in anaerobic pretreated wastewater is a low cost application, with the potential to improve domestic manure by producing valuable animal feed. Additionally, environmental pollution can be diminished through removal of nutrients from effluents.

=== Biofuel ===
Lemna minor is very suitable for bioethanol production. Due to its low cellulose content (approximately 10%) compared to terrestrial plants, the conversion procedure of the starch to ethanol is relatively easy. Grown in swine lagoon diluted water, L. minor accumulates 10.6% starch of total dry weight. Under ideal conditions in terms of phosphate, nitrate and sugar availability and optimal pH, the proportion of starch to total dry weight is slightly higher (12.5%). Suppressing the photosynthetic activity of L. minor by growing it in the dark and the addition of glucose further increases starch accumulation up to 36%.

After harvesting, enzymatic hydrolysis releases up to 96.2% of starch bound glucose. The ethanol yield per dry weight in the subsequent fermentation process depends on the glucose content and nutrient availability in the growth medium, but can be compared to ethanol yields from lignocellulose of energy crops like Miscanthus and giant reed. But in contrast to these energy crops, L. minor biomass does not require any thermal or chemical pretreatments.

Lemna japonica has been genetically engineered to produce up to seven times more oil per acre than soybeans.

=== Ecotoxicity experiments ===
Lemna minor is commonly used for the ecotoxicity assessment of organic and inorganic micropollutants as well as for evaluating the toxicity of wastewater and landfill leachates. Information for the applied methodology are provided in the relevant OECD protocol.
