= List of largest plants =

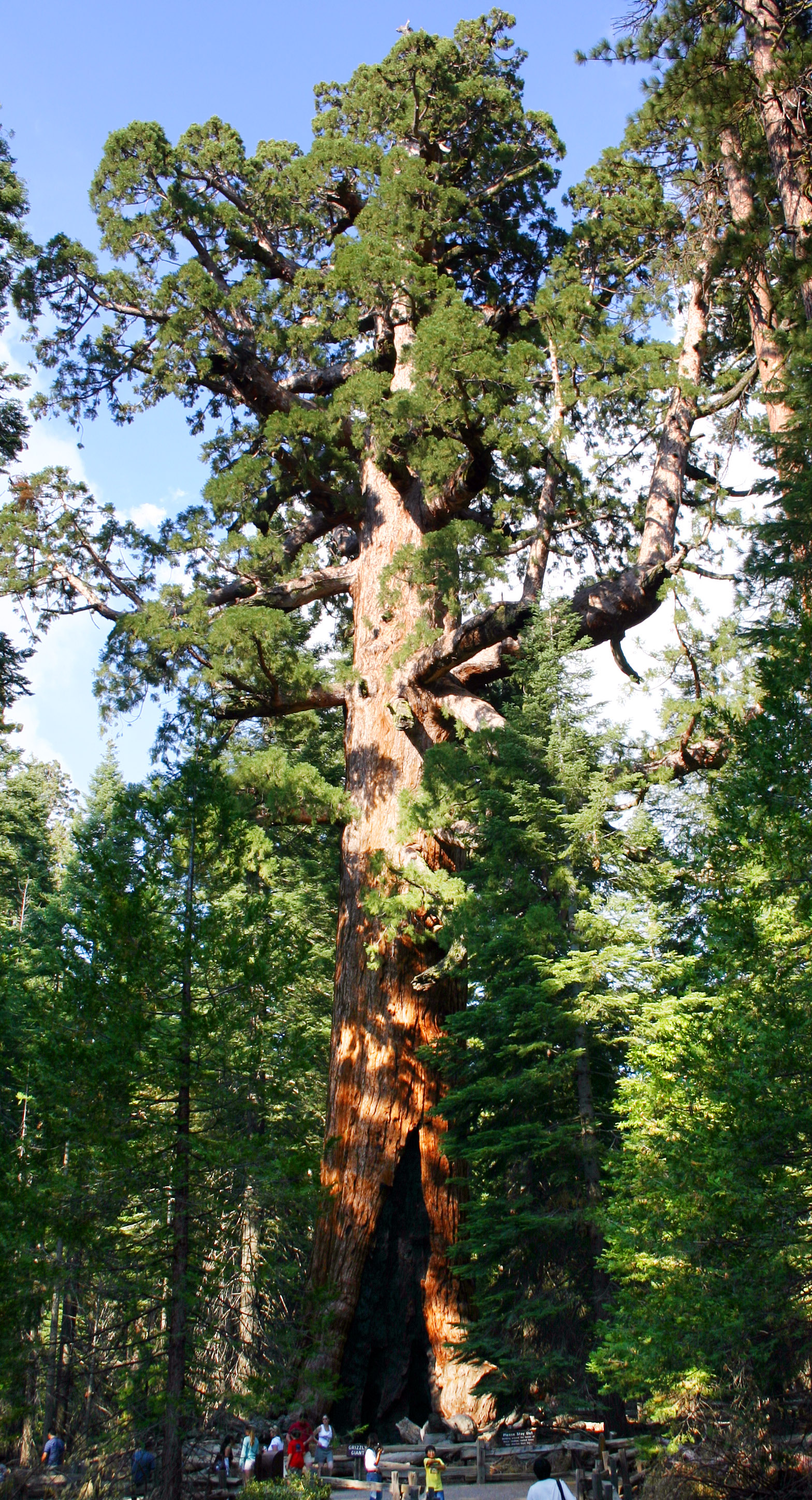
The Giant Sequoia (Grizzly Giant pictured) is the world’s most massive tree

This is a list of the largest plants by clade. Measurements are based on height, volume, length, diameter, and weight, depending on the most appropriate way(s) of measurement for the clade.

== Gymnosperms (Gymnospermae) ==
=== Conifers (Pinopsida) ===
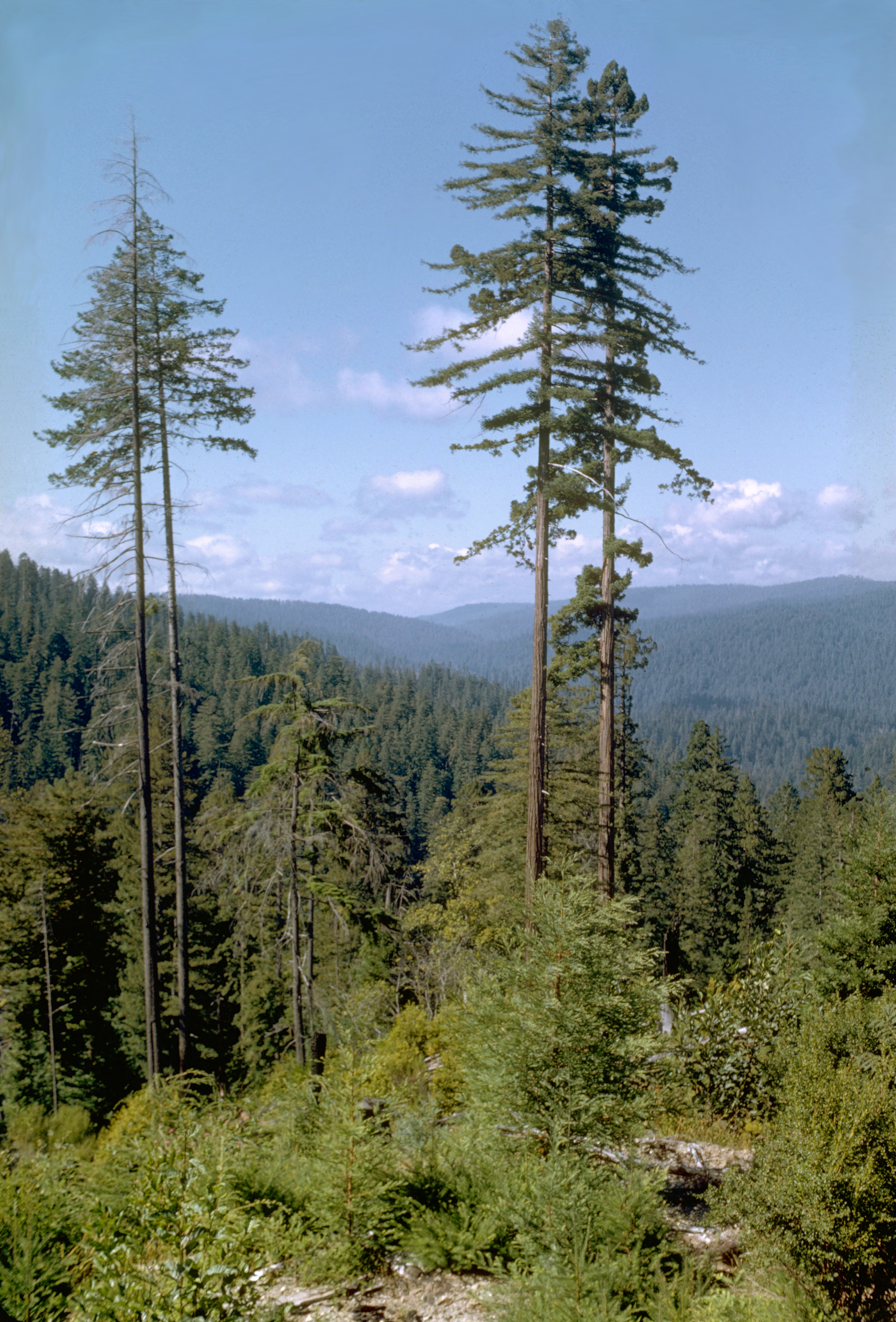
Coastal redwoods are the tallest trees in the world.

The conifer division of plants includes the tallest organism, and the largest single-stemmed plants by wood volume, wood mass, and main stem circumference. The largest by wood volume and mass is the giant sequoia (Sequoiadendron giganteum), native to Sierra Nevada and California; it grows to an average height of 70–85 m (230–279 ft) and 5–7 m (16–23 ft) in diameter. Specimens have been recorded up to 94.9 m (311 ft) in height and (not the same individual) 8.98 m (29.5 ft) in diameter; the largest individual still standing is the General Sherman Tree, with a volume of 1,489 m^{3} (52,600 ft^{3}).

Although typically not so large in volume, the closely related coast redwood (Sequoia sempervirens) of the Pacific coast in North America is taller, reaching a maximum height of 115.85 m (380.1 ft); the Hyperion Tree, which ranks it as the world's tallest known living tree and organism (not including its roots underground).

The conifers also include the largest tree by circumference in the world, the Montezuma cypress (Taxodium mucronatum). The thickest recorded tree, found in Mexico, is called Árbol del Tule, with a circumference of 57.9 m (190 ft) at its base and a diameter of 14.5 m (48 ft) at 1.5 m (4.9 ft) above ground level; its height is over 39.4 m (129 ft). See list of superlative trees for other tree records.

=== Cycads (Cycadophyta) ===
The largest single-stemmed species of cycad is Hope's cycad (Lepidozamia hopei), endemic to the Australian state of Queensland. The largest examples of this species have been over 15 m (49 ft) tall and have had a circumference of 1.5 m (4.9 ft). However the multi-stemmed Encephalartos laurentianus (Zamiaceae) of Bandundu Province in Congo (Kinshasa) and in adjoining parts of Angola is much more massive. The stems, which can be upright when young, but sprawling when mature, are up to 20 m (66 ft) long, and up to 125 cm (49 in) diameter. Assuming a density of 1.0, an old much-branched specimen could weigh up to 45 tonnes (50 short tons).

== Flowering plants (Angiospermae) ==
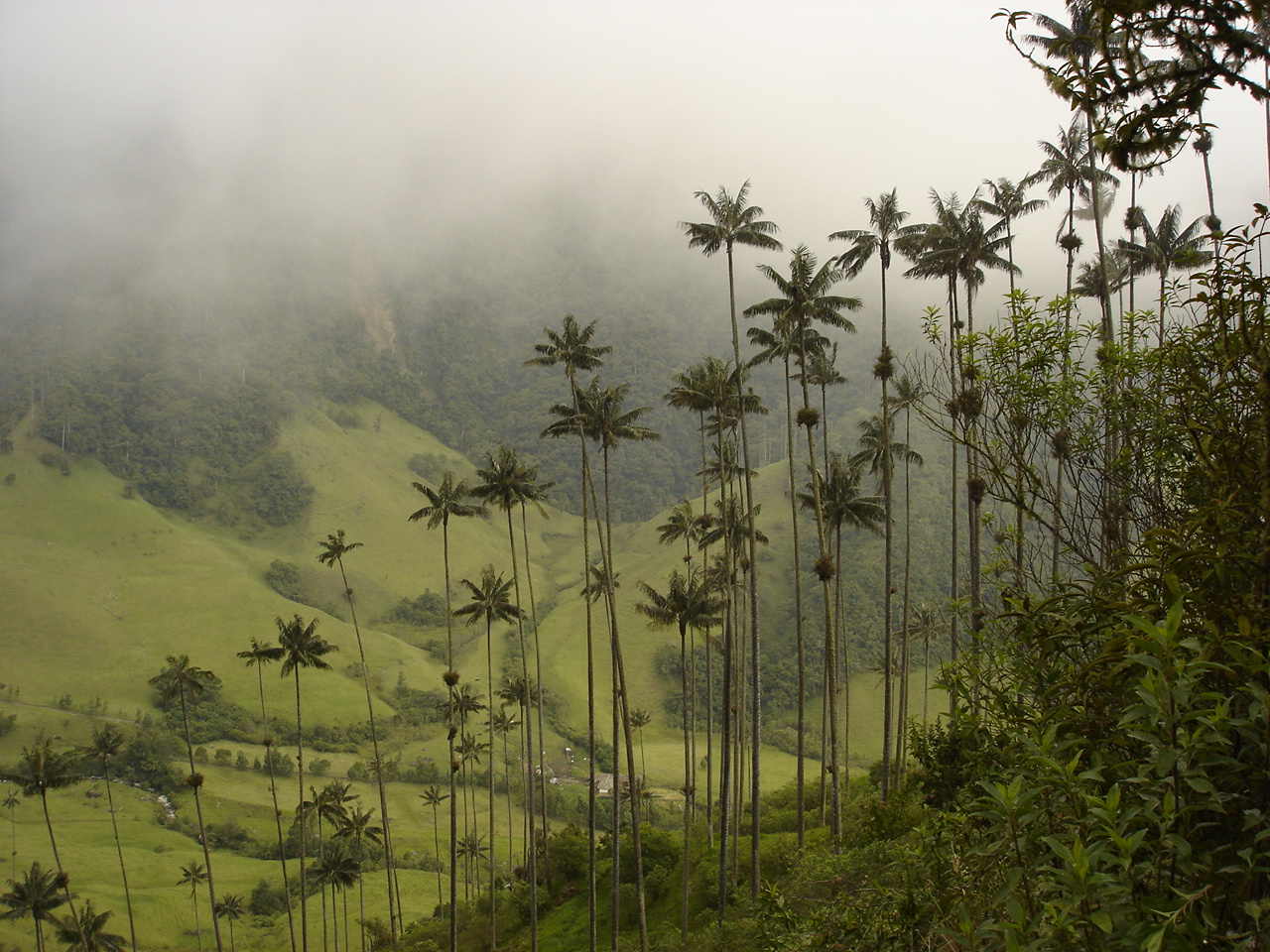
Ceroxylon quindiuense (Quindío wax palm) is the tallest monocot in the world

This is the most diverse and numerous division of plants, with upwards of 400,000 species.

=== Clonal colonies ===
For two-dimensional area, the largest known clonal flowering plant, and indeed largest plant and organism, is a grove of male Aspen in Utah, nicknamed Pando (Populus tremuloides). The grove is connected by a single root system, and each stem above the ground is genetically identical. It is estimated to weigh approximately 6,000,000 kg (13,000,000 lb; 6,600 short tons), and covers 43.6 ha (108 acres).

A form of flowering plant that far exceeds Pando as the largest organism on earth in breadth, is the giant marine plant, Posidonia australis, living in Shark Bay, Australia. Its length is about 180 km (112 mi) and it covers an area of 200 km^{2} (77 mi^{2}). It is estimated to be over 4,500 years old. Believed to have sprouted from a single seed, it grows at about the same rate as a lawn, up to 35 centimetres (14 inches) a year.

Another form of flowering plant Posidonia oceanica discovered in the Mediterranean may be the oldest living organism in the world, with an estimated age of 100,000 years.

=== "Individual" plants ===
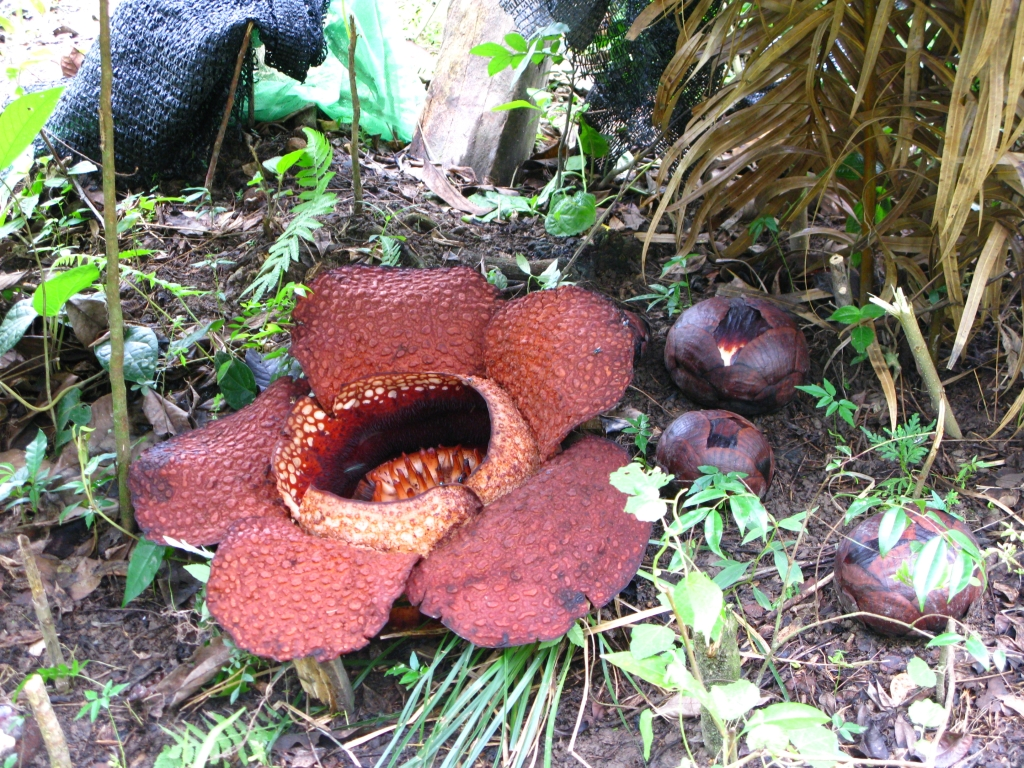
Rafflesia arnoldii flower

By a stricter definition of individuality, and using contending measures of size, Ficus benghalensis, the giant banyan trees of India are the largest trees in the world. In these trees, a network of interconnected stems and branches has grown entirely by vegetative, "branching" propagation. One individual, Thimmamma Marrimanu, in Andhra Pradesh, covers 19,107 square metres, making it the largest single tree by two-dimensional canopy coverage area. This tree is also the world's largest known tree by a related measure, perimeter length, with a distance of 846 metres required to walk around the edge of the canopy. Thimmama Marrimanu is likely also the world's largest tree by three-dimensional canopy volume.

The tallest flowering plant species known is Eucalyptus regnans, of which a living specimen has been measured at 100.5 m (330 ft) in Southern Tasmania. The longest vine to be accurately measured is "Rattan Manau" (Calamus manan) of the palm family (historically Palmae, but now often Arecaceae) and native to the Malay Peninsula, Sumatra and Java. One unbranched stem at Buitenzorg (now Bogor) Botanic Garden, Java was carefully measured to a length of 240 m (787 ft).

Of herbaceous plants, plants without persistent woody growth above ground, Musa ingens is the largest. It can reach about 15 m tall with a pseudostem diameter of around a meter. It also holds the record for the longest petioles or leaf stalks of any plant.

Bamboos are a subfamily (Bambusoideae) of flowering perennial plants in the grass family Poaceae, comprising three tribes: Arundinarieae, Bambuseae, and Olyreae. Dendrocalamus is a tropical genus of giant clumping bamboo found throughout Southeast Asia. It includes Dendrocalamus giganteus, which can reach heights up to 30 m.

Other records among flowering plants include, the title of largest flower, which belongs to the species Rafflesia arnoldii. One of these flowers can reach a diameter of 1 m (3.3 ft) and weigh up to 11 kg (24 lb). The largest unbranched inflorescence, resembling (but not qualifying as) a giant flower, belongs to the titan arum (Amorphophallus titanum), reaching almost 3 m (9.8 ft) in height. The absolute largest inflorescence, at up to 8 m (26 ft) long, is borne by the talipot palm (Corypha umbraculifera) of India. The largest leaves belong to either Gunnera manicata, Raphia regalis, Manicaria saccifera, Marojejya darianii, Johannesteijsmannia altifrons, or Victoria boliviana, depending on criteria.

== Pteridophyta ==
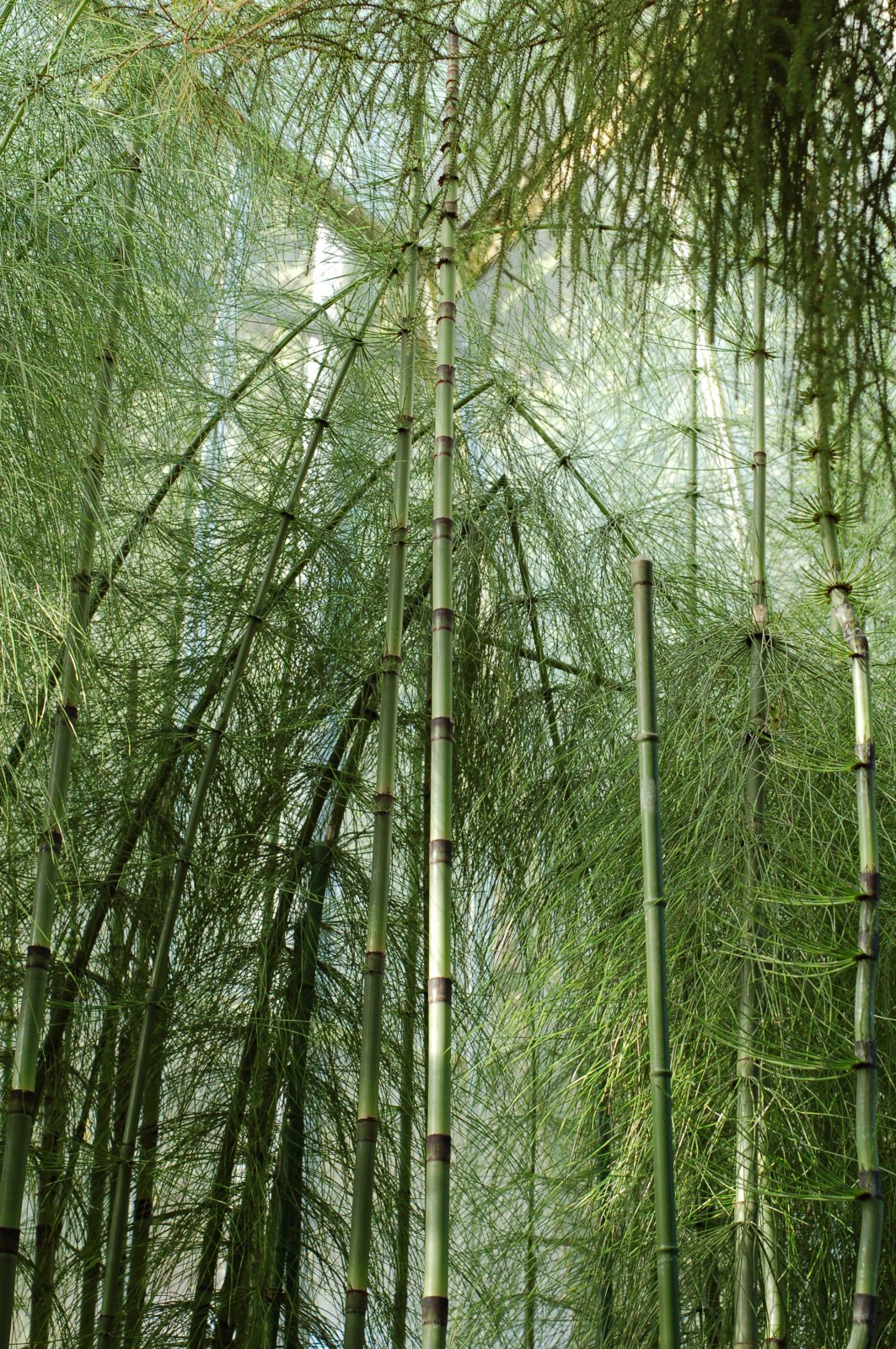
A stand of Equisetum myriochaetum, the world's largest horsetail species

=== Horsetails (Equisetopsida) ===
The largest of horsetail is the species Equisetum myriochaetum, native to Nicaragua, Costa Rica, Colombia, Venezuela, Ecuador, Peru and Mexico. The biggest specimen known was 8 m (26 ft) tall and had a diameter of 2.5 cm (0.98 in).

=== Ferns (Pteridopsida) ===
The largest species of fern is probably Sphaeropteris excelsa of Norfolk Island, which may be 20 m (66 ft) or more in height.

== Bryophytes ==
=== Liverworts (Marchantiophyta) ===
The largest species of liverwort is a New Zealand species, Schistochila appendiculata. The top size of this species is 1.1 m (3.6 ft) long, a diameter of 2.5 cm (0.98 in) and a stem length of 10 cm (3.9 in). Another New Zealand liverwort, Plagiochila gigantea (Jungermaniaceae), is a cushion plant up to 90 cm (35 in) wide and up to 75 cm (30 in) height. It is endemic to the Southern Alps of South Island.

=== Mosses (Bryophyta) ===
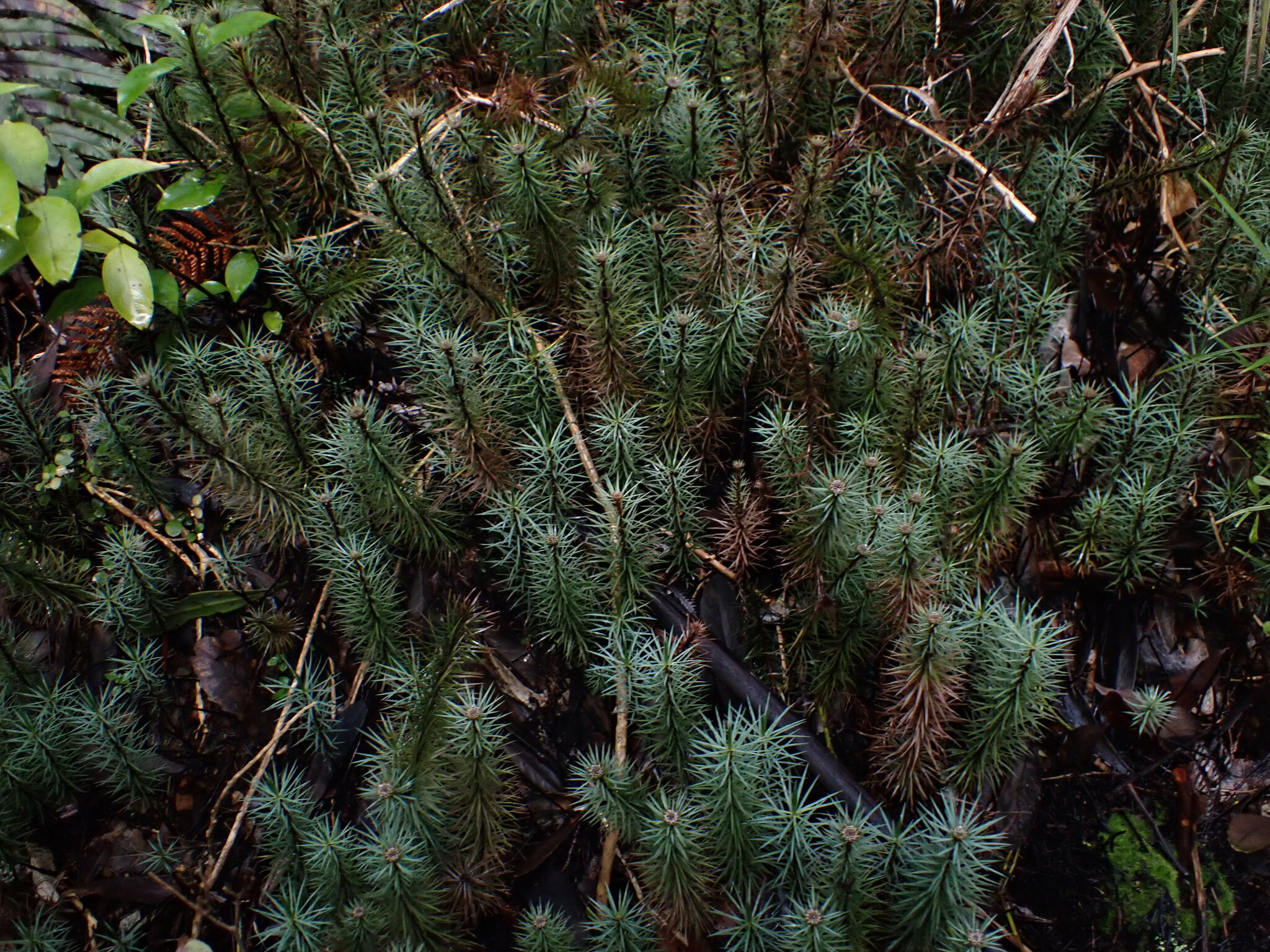
Dawsonia superba is the tallest moss in the world.

The world's most massive moss is Dawsonia superba, of Australia and New Zealand. This species has numerous 50 cm (20 in) tall, upright shoots, joined by a network of rhizomes. The tallest moss is Spiridens reinwardtii of the family Hypnodendraceae and native to Indonesia, Malaysia, Papua New Guinea, the Philippines, Melanesia and Taiwan. S. reinwardtii is a vine which is typically 30 to 40 cm (12 to 16 in) high but can climb to a height of 3 m (10 ft). Spiridens reinwardtii is the only true vine among mosses and climbs by twining. The longest individuals seem to be in New Guinea.

== See also ==
- Largest organisms
- List of superlative trees
- List of world records held by plants
- List of largest inflorescences
- List of world's largest seeds
- List of world's largest mushrooms and conks
