= List of largest inflorescences =

The following is a list of the largest inflorescences known from plants that produce seeds.

Type	Species and family	Native range	Dimensions	Comments
Largest overall, largest panicle, largest monocot,	Corypha umbraculifera; Arecaceae (Talipot palm)	Southwestern India and Sri Lanka (Ceylon)	Panicle can reach more than 8 m (26 ft) tall. The flowering stem (peduncle) is up to 36 cm (14 in) thick.	It consists of up to sixty million (60,000,000) flowers and emerges from a bud 1.2 m (3 ft 11 in) high and 30 cm (1 ft) in thickness. It is Monocarpic, flowering and fruiting only once, then dying.
Tallest inflorescence	Agave weberi; Asparagaceae	San Luis Potosí and Tamaulipas	The flowering stem, the scape, may very rarely reach as much as 13 m (43 ft) in height in Florida, but in its native range it only reaches 8 m (26 ft). The panicle in the strict sense is just 3 m (9.8 ft) of this height.	Each rosette is monocarpic, but the plant produces side shoots or "pups" which can grow as large as the mother plant. The population in Florida was regarded as a separate species as Agave neglecta, but has now been synonymized with A. weberi.
Largest dicot inflorescence	Caloncoba flagelliflora ; Achariaceae	Cameroon, Republic of the Congo, Gabon, and Democratic Republic of the Congo in Africa.	Each of the runners may radiate out more than 10 m (33 ft) from the trunk of the tree along the forest floor, with the maximum length measured as 11.8 m (39 ft).	Its 5 cm (2.0 in) wide, six-petaled white flowers rise just above the forest litter. This could be one of the longest lived inflorescences. In principle it could produce flowers for decades.
Largest complex inflorescence (the major framework is one sort of inflorescence such as a panicle or raceme, but the subunits are not individual flowers, but some completely different sort of inflorescence such as a fig, which is a syconium)	Ficus uncinata; Moraceae	Malay Peninsula and Borneo	Stolon-panicle up to 10 m (33 ft) in length. Width not stated. Subunits are syconia (figs).	Almost all fig species are pollinated by parasitic wasps, usually one wasp species exclusively with one Ficus species. It is not clear how these two subterranean figs accomplish pollination.
Largest spiciform panicle	Puya raimondii; Bromeliaceae ("Titanka" or "Cunco")	High Andes of Peru and western to central Bolivia	Spiciform panicle that usually reaches 4–5 m (13–16 ft) in height, but has a maximum recorded height of 8 m (26 ft). The total height of the plant when blooming may reach 15 m (49 ft). The stem at the base of the inflorescence may be 60–90 cm (24–35 in) in height and a very thick 20–40 cm (7.9–15.7 in).	Composed of 8,000 to 20,000 flowers arranged into several hundred secondary spikes, each subtended by a conspicuous bract. Like the Talipot and most Agaves, this is a monocarp. The life cycle from seed to seed is 80 to 150 years. The largest individuals are to be found near the abandoned village of Manallasaq, Huamanga Province, Peru.
Largest triplex inflorescence (combining features of three different kinds of inflorescences)	"Makua" (Harmsiopanax ingens) Araliaceae.	Montane rainforests of New Guinea.	Up to 5 m (16 ft) high and comparable width.	The basic framework is a panicle, The ultimate twigs are spikes, but not with individual flowers, but about fifty tiny umbels of 8 to 20 flowers each. H. ingens is another monocarp. Harmsiopanax may be the only genus which combines three types of inflorescence.
Largest thyrse	Maypole Tree (Sohnreyia excelsa) Rutaceae.	Amazon Basin	Up to 3 m (9.8 ft) in height and equally wide and composed of numerous botryoid cymes.	This also is a monocarp. It was discovered in 1911 by Dr. Ernst H. G. Ule. Also called Spathelia excelsa.
Largest unbranched inflorescence, largest spatheate inflorescence	The krubi, or bunga bangui Amorphophallus titanum; Araceae	Sumatra	Spadix up to 3 m (9.8 ft) in height. Spathe about half as high and 1.5 m (4 ft 11 in) across the mouth. Amorphophallus hewettii marginally smaller. Amorphophallus gigas taller but smaller.	The plant lives about 40 years, blooming about every fourth year. The inflorescence springs up from a corm weighing up to 117 kg (258 lb). A corm grown by Dr. Louis Ricciardello of Gilford, New Hampshire is claimed to have weighed 138 kg (304 lb) and produced an inflorescence 3.1052 m (10.188 ft) in height. The tallest A. titanum inflorescence reported in a credible source is 3.30 m (10.8 ft). In the non-flowering years the corm produces a single compound leaf about 4.5–6 m (15–20 ft) high, and comparably wide, resembling a small tree.
Largest true spike (all flowers attached directly to the main axis)	"Lechugilla" or "mescal pelon". Agave pelona Agavaceae	Sonora State, Mexico.	Spike per se up to 5.2 m (17 ft) long with additionally a 1.4 m (4 ft 7 in) peduncle.	'
Largest catkin	Ivory palm (Phytelephas macrocarpa). Palmae, or Arecaceae.	Montane rainforests of the Andes.	Male catkins up to 1.2 m (3 ft 11 in) long by 25 cm (9.8 in) thick.	According to Dr. Giuseppe Mazza, the Coco de Mer (Lodoicea maldivica) can have male catkins up to 2 m (6 ft 7 in) in length. but no more than 10 cm (3.9 in) width (and therefore less massive than those of Phytelephas). Lodoicea is another candidate for longest living inflorescence since the catkins are known to produce pollen for a period of ten years, "or more".
Largest overall umbel, largest compound umbel	Caucasian hogweed (Heracleum mantegazzianum) Umbelliferae	Originally from Caucasus Mountains, but now naturalized to much of Europe.	Twice compound umbel up to 1.5 m (4 ft 11 in) in width, and composed of about 10,000 flowers.	The sap of this plant can produce severe burns to human skin.
Largest raceme	"Gibarra" (Lobelia rhynchopetalum). Campanulaceae	The high mountains of Ethiopia.	Raceme up to 3.5 m (11 ft) in height by about 25 cm (9.8 in) wide, on a plant with a total height of 4.6–6.7 m (15–22 ft)	Similar giant Lobelia species are found in Ruwenzori and Mount Kilimanjaro. The Iliau (Wilkesia gymnoxiphium; Asteraceae) of Kauai, Hawai'i produces complex racemes up to 90 cm (35 in) long by up to 38 cm (15 in) wide on a peduncle up to 2.7 m (8 ft 10 in) in length, on a plant with a total height of about 3.7 m (12 ft). The raceme consists of about two hundred yellow daisy heads (capitula) each about 2.5 cm (0.98 in) in diameter. These are arranged in about 20 whorls of ten capitula each.
Largest bractate inflorescence	Phyllobotryon soyauxianum. Historically Flacourtiaceae, but now included in Salicaceae.	Rainforests of Nigeria, Cameroons and Gabon	Bract up to 1 m (3 ft 3 in) in length by 18 cm (7.1 in) in width.	Also spelled Phyllobotryum, and also known as Phyllobotryon spatulatum. The flowers appear along the midrib. It is thought by most morphologists that this represents the fusion of an inflorescence to a leaf as in Tilia species, rather than transfer of reproductive function to the leaves as in Ginkgo biloba 'Epiphylla', and some Streptocarpus spp. The largest individual flower borne upon a leaf is that of Erythrochiton hypophyllanthus (Rutaceae) of South America, which bears a solitary flower up to 7 cm (2.8 in) wide in the middle of a leaf up to 50 cm (20 in) length by 13.3 cm (5.2 in) wide.
Largest enclosed (self insulated) inflorescence	Sikkim rhubarb (Rheum nobile) (Chenopodiaceae)	The Himalayas.	Up to 2 m (6 ft 7 in) in height by 60 cm (24 in) in width at base.	The inflorescence is enclosed by overlapping, translucent, cream-colored bracts up to 25 cm (9.8 in) diameter.
Largest globular capitulum (wild)	African breadfruit (Treculia africana) Moraceae	Central Africa.	About 10 cm (3.9 in) at time of flowering, eventually becoming up to 45 cm (18 in) in width by about half as long and weighing up to 14 kg (31 lb). According to Aubreville, The capitulum can be up to 50 cm (20 in) wide and up to 15 kg (33 lb) in weight.	The largest globular capitulum (domesticated) is the Jackfruit (Artocarpus heterophyllus) (Moraceae) grown throughout southern Asia and the East Indies. The largest Jackfruit reported in a reliable journal weighed 51 kg (112 lb). Both the Jakcfruit and Treculia are cauliflorous (flowers and fruit borne directly on the trunk and/or major limbs). The present Guinness champion, from Pune (Poona), Maharashtra, India, weighs 42.72 kg (94.2 lb).
Largest capitate inflorescence (wild)	King protea (Protea cynaroides) Proteaceae.	West Cape Province, South Africa.	30 cm (12 in) in diameter, including bracts. By contrast, the smallest wild capitate inflorescence is that of Hesperevax sparsiflora, a composite, which has 5 to 9 disc florets, each only 0.2 mm width, surrounded by bracts bringing the capitulum up to 3.8 mm width.	The largest capitate inflorescence (domesticated) is the so-called "Russian Sunflower" (Helianthus annuus macrocarpus) Compositae which has developed capitate inflorescences or "heads" as much as 65 cm (26 in) wide, or 74 cm (29 in) if the ray florets are included. The "Russian" sunflower is native to the North American prairies. The tightly packed disc florets can have a phyllotaxis as high as 144 / 377.
Largest simple umbel (all flowers radiate from one central locus point)	Candelabra flower (Brunsvigia orientalis, or B. gigantea) Amaryllidaceae.	South Africa.	The 35 deep rose flowers form a ball up to 60 cm (24 in) diameter.	The simple umbel with the greatest number of flowers is Flowering Onion (Allium giganteum)[Alliaceae] of the Himalayas. Mr. James N. Giridlian, a bulb dealer in Arcadia, California counted 5286 florets in a single globular umbel about 15 cm (5.9 in) diameter.
Largest cincinnus	Paloeloe or sororoca (Phenakospermum guyannense) (Strelitziaceae)	The wetlands of the Amazon Rainforest.	Each cincinnus of up to 25 flowers is subtended by a sheathing bract up to 43 cm (17 in) in length and 36 cm (14 in) wide at the base. Each flower is up to 28 cm (11 in) in length. There are up to ten cincinni, alternating left and right, on a peduncle up to 3.7 m (12 ft) in total height.	This is another monocarp with a terminal inflorescence, but like some agaves it produces sideshoots which will eventually grow as large as the mother plant; in the case of Ph. guianense up to 12 m (39 ft) tall.
Largest verticillaster	Lion's ear or wild dagga (Leonotis leonurus) Lamiaceae	Savannas of South Africa and adjacent southern Africa.	Five to eight evenly spaced globular clusters along a peduncle up to 0.9 m (2 ft 11 in) in height by up to 9 cm (3.5 in) in width.	Some bamboos such as Dendrocalamus spp. have verticillasters of more numerous, but smaller clusters.
Largest syconium	Dinner plate fig (Ficus dammaropsis) (Moraceae)	Montane Rainforests of New Guinea.	Up to 18 cm (7.1 in) diameter.	
Largest cyme	Begonia macdougalii (Begoniaceae)	Mexico.	Total length 264 cm (104 in) but only 18 cm (7.1 in) is the cyme sensu stricto, the rest being the peduncle.	Reportedly also in Brazil.
Largest adventitious inflorescence	Cape primrose (Streptocarpus saundersii) Gesneriaceae.	KwaZulu-Natal Province, South Africa.	White or pale lavender flowers form a cluster about 60 cm (24 in) high by about half as wide.	Unlike Tilia and Phyllobotryon, reproductive function has been transferred to the leaf. The entire plant consists of a single cotyledon (seed leaf) up to 75 cm (30 in) long by 60 cm (24 in) wide. The inflorescence forms near the petiole end of the leaf.
Largest corymb	American elderberry (Sambucus canadensis maxima) Caprifoliaceae.	Eastern North America.	Corymb up to 45 cm (18 in) in width.	
Largest dimorphic bractate inflorescence	Marcgravia evenia (Marcgraviaceae)	Cuba	About 30 cm (12 in) long by 7.5–10 cm (3.0–3.9 in) wide.	This inflorescence is extraordinary. At the upper end of the pendant inflorescence are several concave bracts angled to reflect and focus the sonar pulses of bats, helping the bats to locate the flowers. In the middle of the inflorescence the tubular, about 20 tetramerous flowers form a discoid circle (or flat umbel) about 8 cm (3.1 in) diameter. Below this a second set of bracts are formed into extrafloral nectaries which provide a reward for the bats' efforts.
Largest bifloral inflorescence (always consists of exactly two flowers)	Burmese honeysuckle. (Lonicera hildebrandiana)(Caprifoliaceae)	Southern China, northern Burma and northern Thailand.	Each flower up to 18 cm (7.1 in) in length.	
Largest individual flower or solitary inflorescence	Kerubut (Rafflesia arnoldii); Rafflesiaceae	Sumatra	Diameter 100 cm (39 in) is most commonly given as the upper limit of R. arnoldii flower width. The largest R. arnoldii actually measured was one found by Prof. Syahbuddin of Andalas University in the Palupah Nature Reserve near Bukittinggi, Sumatra which measured 104 cm (41 in) wide.	Although R. arnoldii has the greatest average size, the largest Rafflesia flower actually measured was one of Rafflesia kerrii of peninsular Malaysia and peninsular Thailand). Found by Dr. Gan Canglin in August 2007 in Kelantan State, Malaysia, it measured 112 cm (44 in) wide. Previously unknown to science, R. kerrii was described by Meijer in 1984.
Longest solitary inflorescence	Pelican flower (Aristolochia grandiflora) (Aristolochiaceae)	Southern Mexico, Central America and the West Indies.	Floral tube (in this case a calyx) up to 50 cm (20 in) wide, with one sepal extending downward as a 'tail' up to 3 m (9.8 ft) long and about 1 cm in width. This flower is much lighter than Rafflesia; about 1 kg (2.2 lb) as against up to 11 kg (24 lb) for R. arnoldii	Rohwer says the tail can be up to 4 m (13 ft) in length. The tail serves as a "red carpet" to lead pollinators to the stamens and pistel.
Smallest inflorescence	Wolffia arrhiza (Lemnaceae)	Wetlands of North America and the West Indies.	The single male flower, measuring 0.33 mm height combined with one female flower measuring 0.3 mm diameter to form a tiny inflorescence only 0.33 mm average width.	

== See also ==
- List of superlative trees
- List of world records held by plants
- List of largest seeds
- Largest organisms
- Largest fungal fruit bodies
