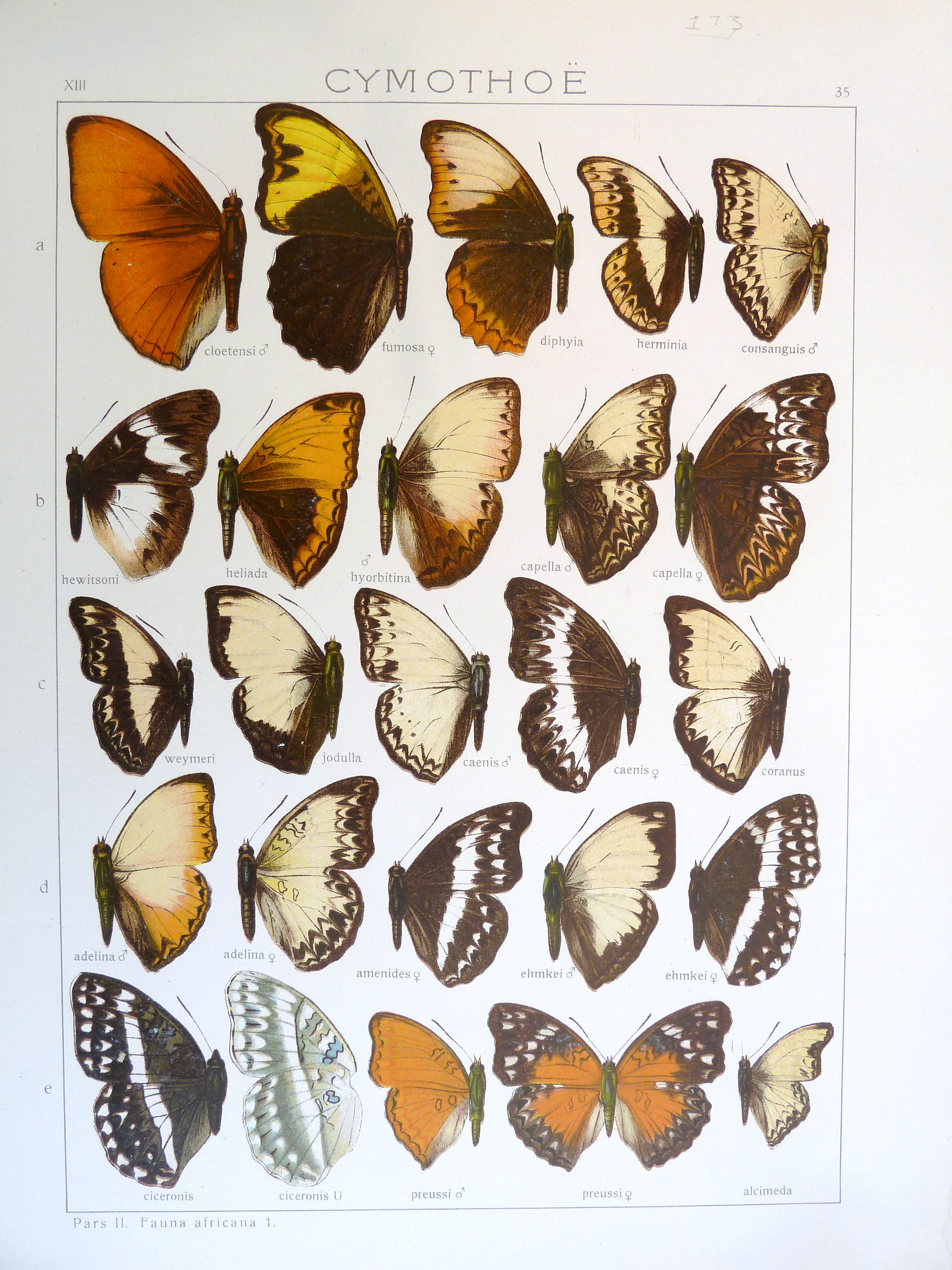
- In Adalbert Seitz's Fauna Africana

Scientific classification
- Kingdom: Animalia
- Phylum: Arthropoda
- Clade: Pancrustacea
- Class: Insecta
- Order: Lepidoptera
- Family: Nymphalidae
- Genus: Cymothoe
- Species: C. jodutta

Binomial name
- Cymothoe jodutta (Westwood, 1850)

Synonyms
- Harma jodutta Westwood, 1850; Cymothoe aralus Mabille, 1890; Harma ciceronis Ward, 1871; Harma cyriades Ward, 1871; Cymothoe seneca Kirby, 1889; Cymothoe ehmkei var. intermedia Gaede, 1916; Cymothoe ehmckei Dewitz, 1887

= Cymothoe jodutta =

Species of butterfly

Cymothoe jodutta, the jodutta glider, is a butterfly in the family Nymphalidae. It is found in Guinea, Sierra Leone, Liberia, Ivory Coast, Ghana, Nigeria, Cameroon, Gabon, the Republic of the Congo, the Central African Republic, the Democratic Republic of the Congo and Uganda. The habitat consists of wet forests.

The larvae feed on Caloncoba species.

Torben Larsen developed a species numbering system for his 2005 publication Butterflies of West Africa. This species is #868. The 'Larsen' numbers have since been used with permission in A Sharp Eye on Butterflies of Ghana.

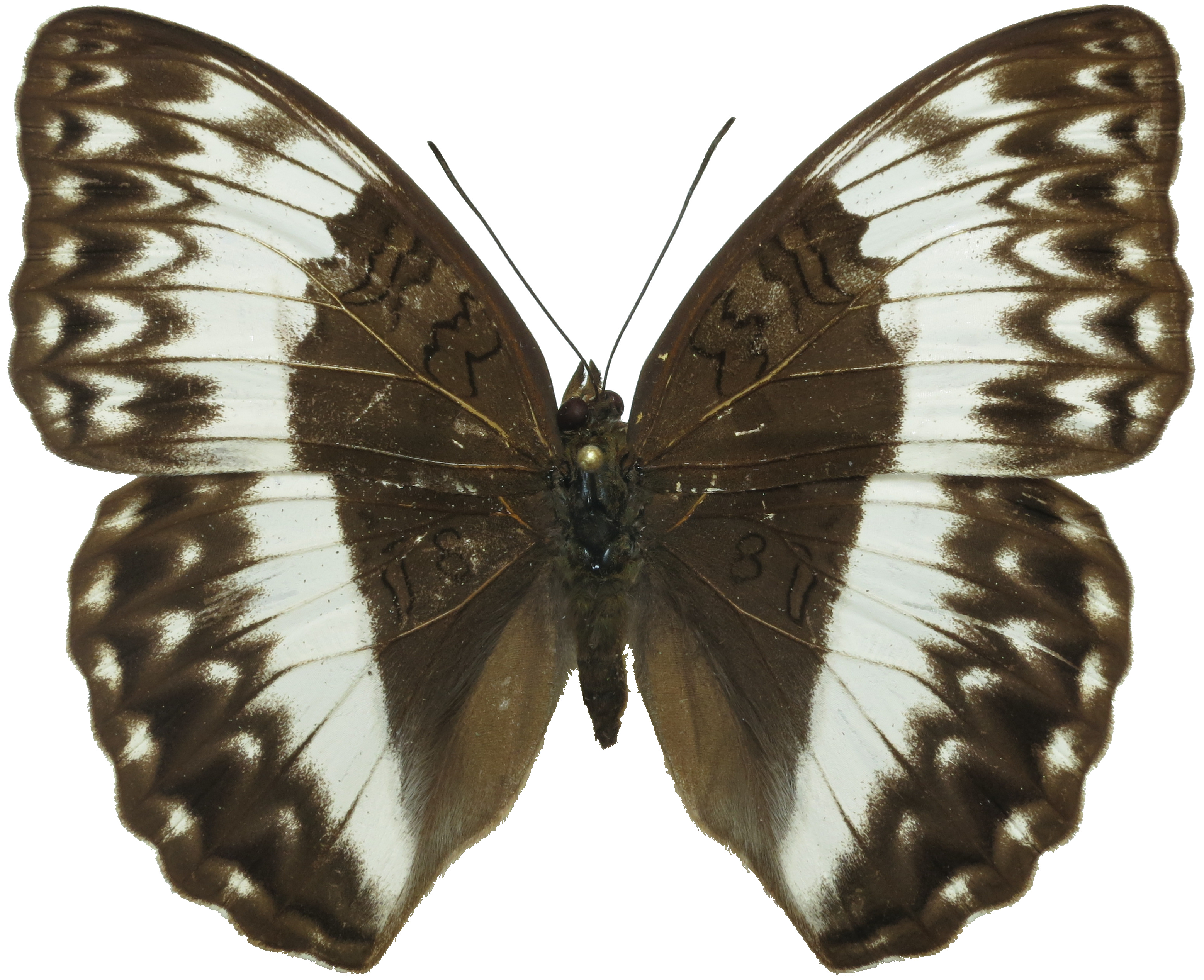
C. jodutta ciceronis female dorsal side

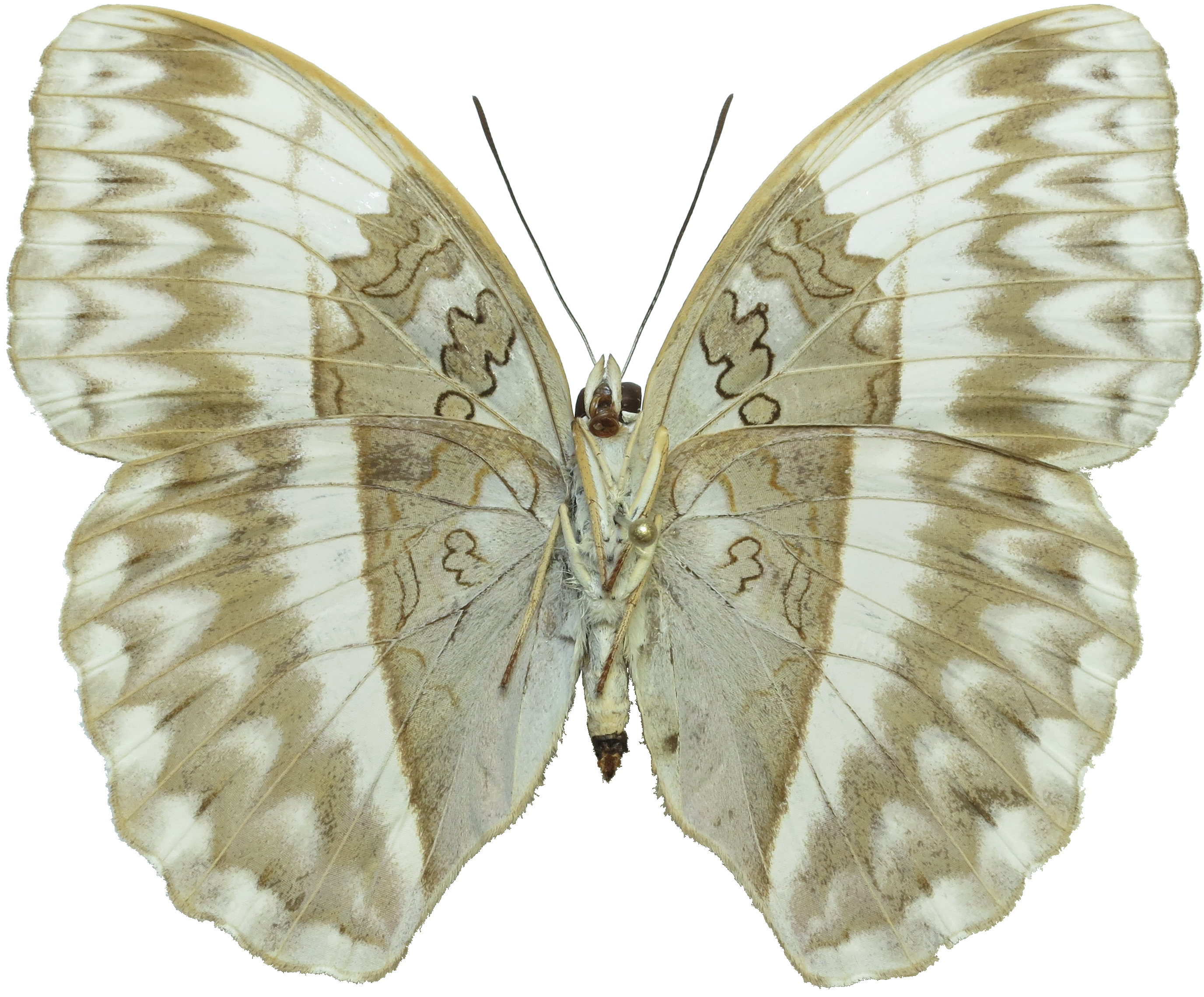
C. jodutta ciceronis female ventral side

== Subspecies ==
- Cymothoe jodutta jodutta (Guinea, Sierra Leone, Liberia, Ivory Coast, Ghana)
- Cymothoe jodutta ciceronis (Ward, 1871) (Nigeria: east of Niger, Cameroon, Gabon, Congo, Central African Republic, Democratic Republic of the Congo: Mayumbe)
- Cymothoe jodutta ehmckei Dewitz, 1887 (Democratic Republic of the Congo: Tshuapa, Mai-Ndombe, Kinshasa, Kwango, Kasai, Sankuru)
- Cymothoe jodutta mostinckxi Overlaet, 1952 (Uganda: west to the Bwamba Valley, Democratic Republic of the Congo: Ubangi, Mongala, Uele, Ituri, Kivu and Tshopo)
