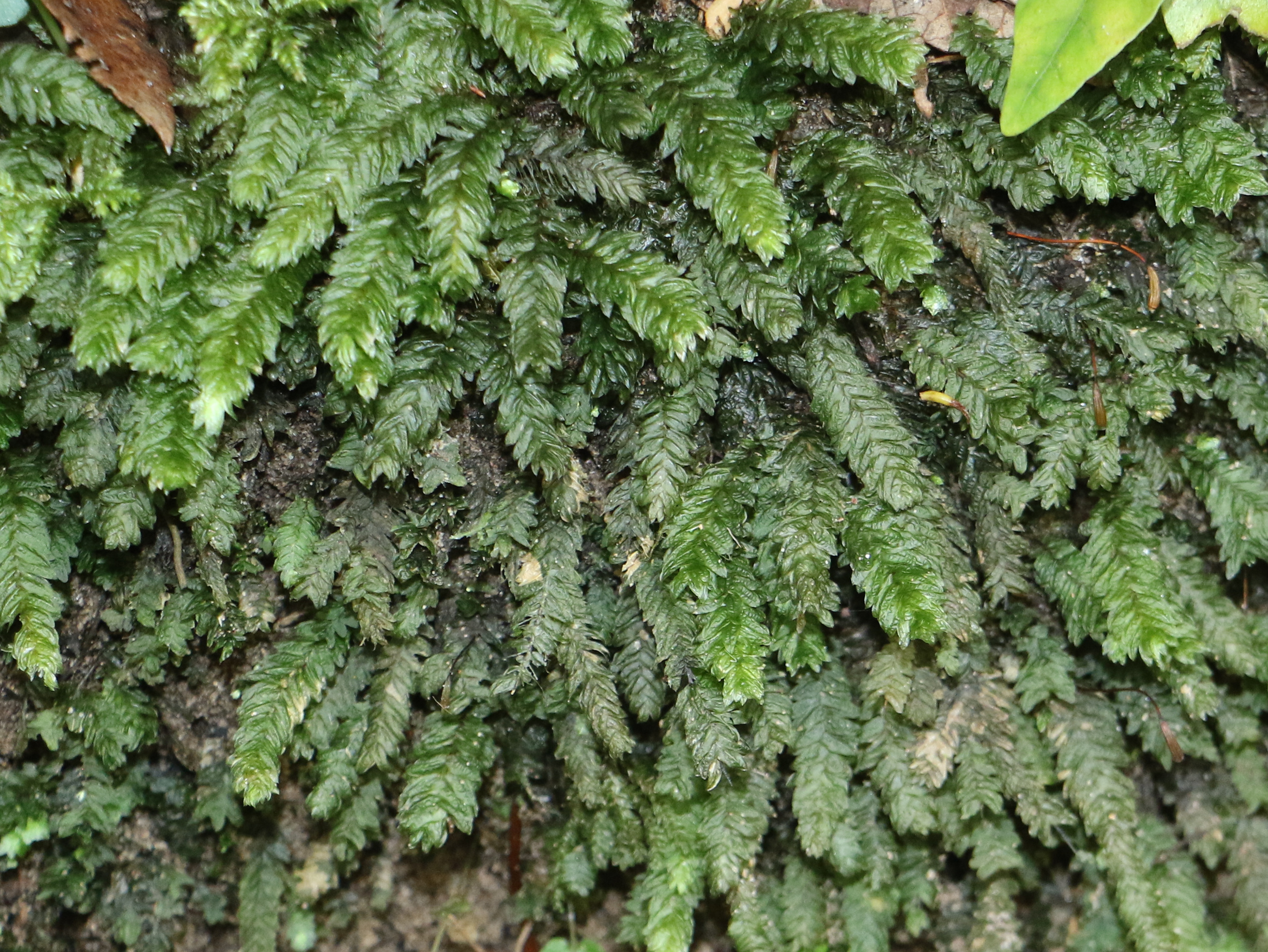
- Growing beside the Hacking River, Australia

Scientific classification
- Kingdom: Plantae
- Division: Marchantiophyta
- Class: Jungermanniopsida
- Order: Perssoniellales
- Family: Schistochilaceae
- Genus: Schistochila
- Species: S. lehmanniana

Binomial name
- Schistochila lehmanniana (Lehm. & Lindenb.) Carrington & Pearson

Synonyms
- Jungermannia lehmanniana

= Schistochila lehmanniana =

Species of plant

Schistochila lehmanniana is a species of liverwort in the family Schistochilaceae, commonly known as "Common Pocketwort", and are known for their "handsome" appearance. Schistochila lehmanniana is the most common Schistochila liverwort, and can be found in various substrates in wet forest and rainforest across Australia and New Zealand.

== Description ==
Schistochila lehmanniana is a small, leafy liverwort, growing to 8 cm in length from the class Jungermanniopsida, the largest of the liverwort classes. S. lehmanniana can be identified by its pale green or yellow non-pubescent leaves, meaning short hairs on the leaf surface called trichomes are absent. Its leaves are small, non-incised and lammalate, meaning they are look like a thin plate or scale. Leaves are approximately 5mm long, ovate in shape, crowded along the stem and soft to the touch. Distinctly, Schistochila lehmanniana has four lobed, convex stipules. It is a branched, clumping liverwort, with rhizoids on the lower half of the shoot "rooting" the plant to substrate such as logs and roots.

Phenotypically, Schistochila lehmanniana is similar to the other two genera of Schistochilacea found within Tasmania, Paraschistochila, Pachyschistochila as well as another species in the Schistochila genera: S. balfouriana. It can be differentiated by the presence of underleaves, stem paraphylls and stipules. Underleaves are a modified, ventral leaf found in many leafy liverworts. They are small and scale like, running along the centre of the abaxial thallus. Paraphylls are small leaf-like protuberances that run along the stem of a plant and have photosynthetic abilities.

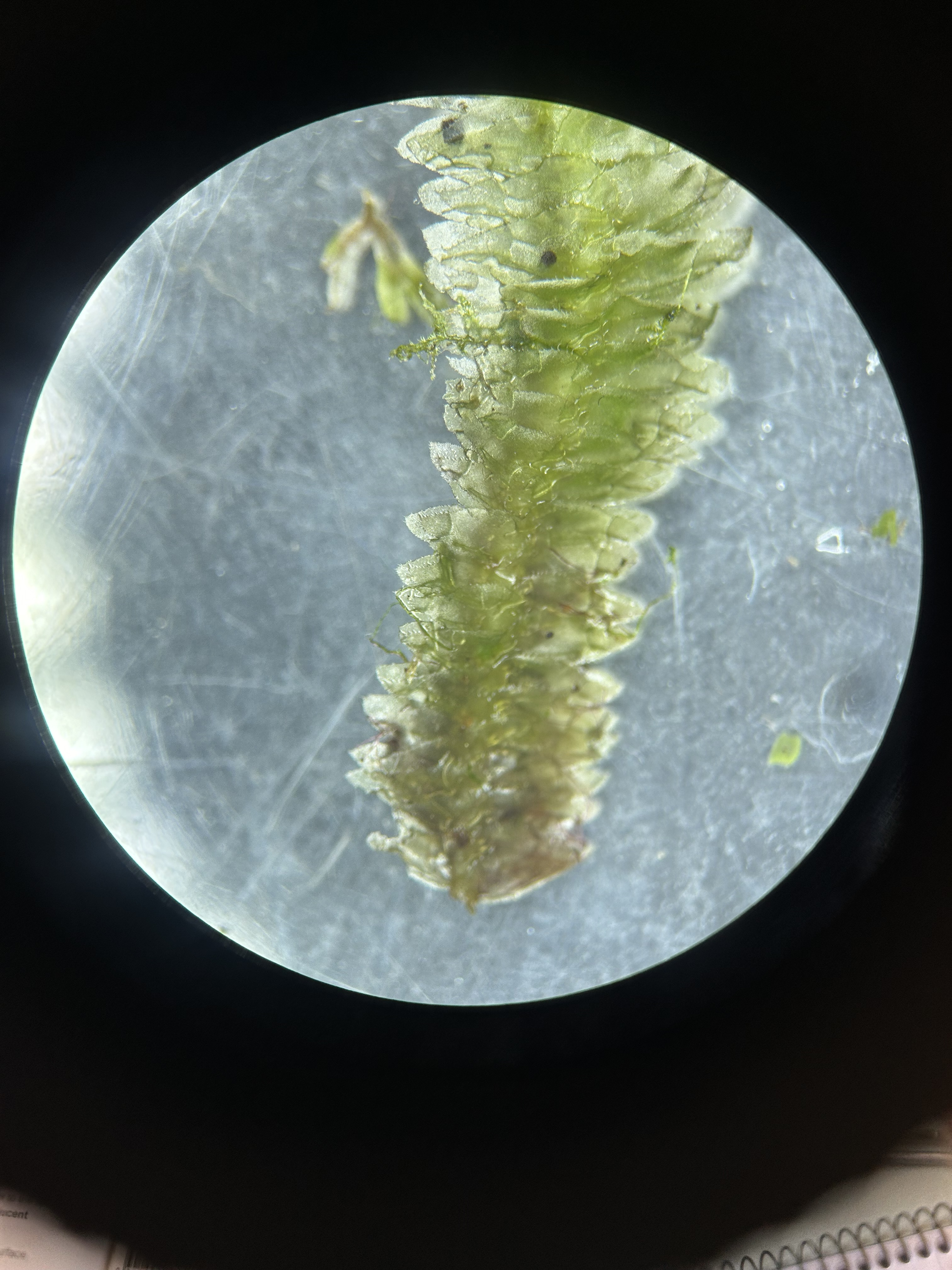
Underside of Schistochila lehmanniana under microscope

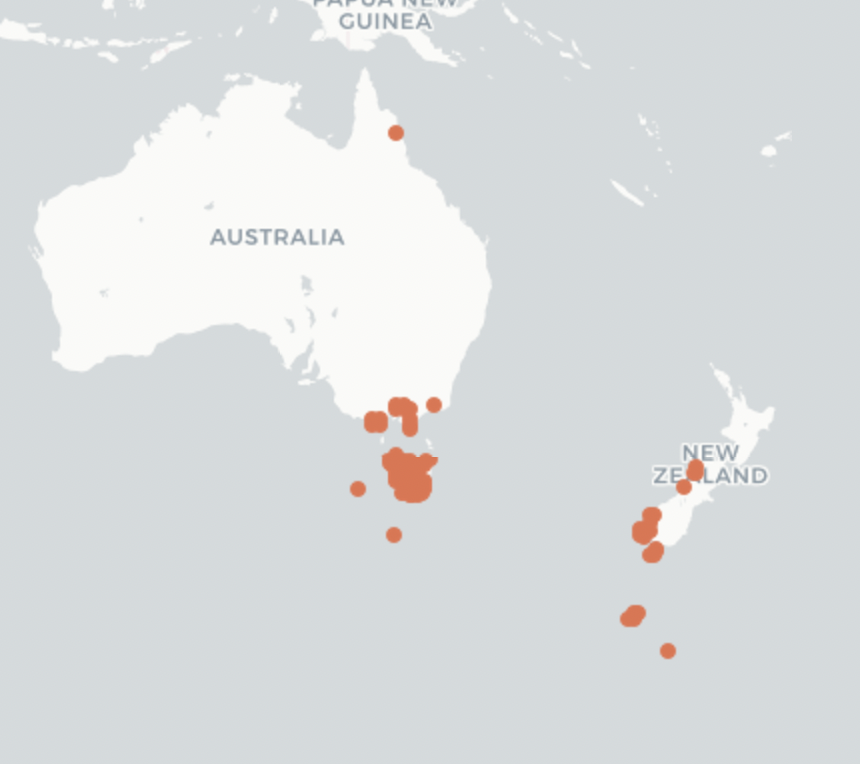
Habitat distribution of Schistochila lehmanniana

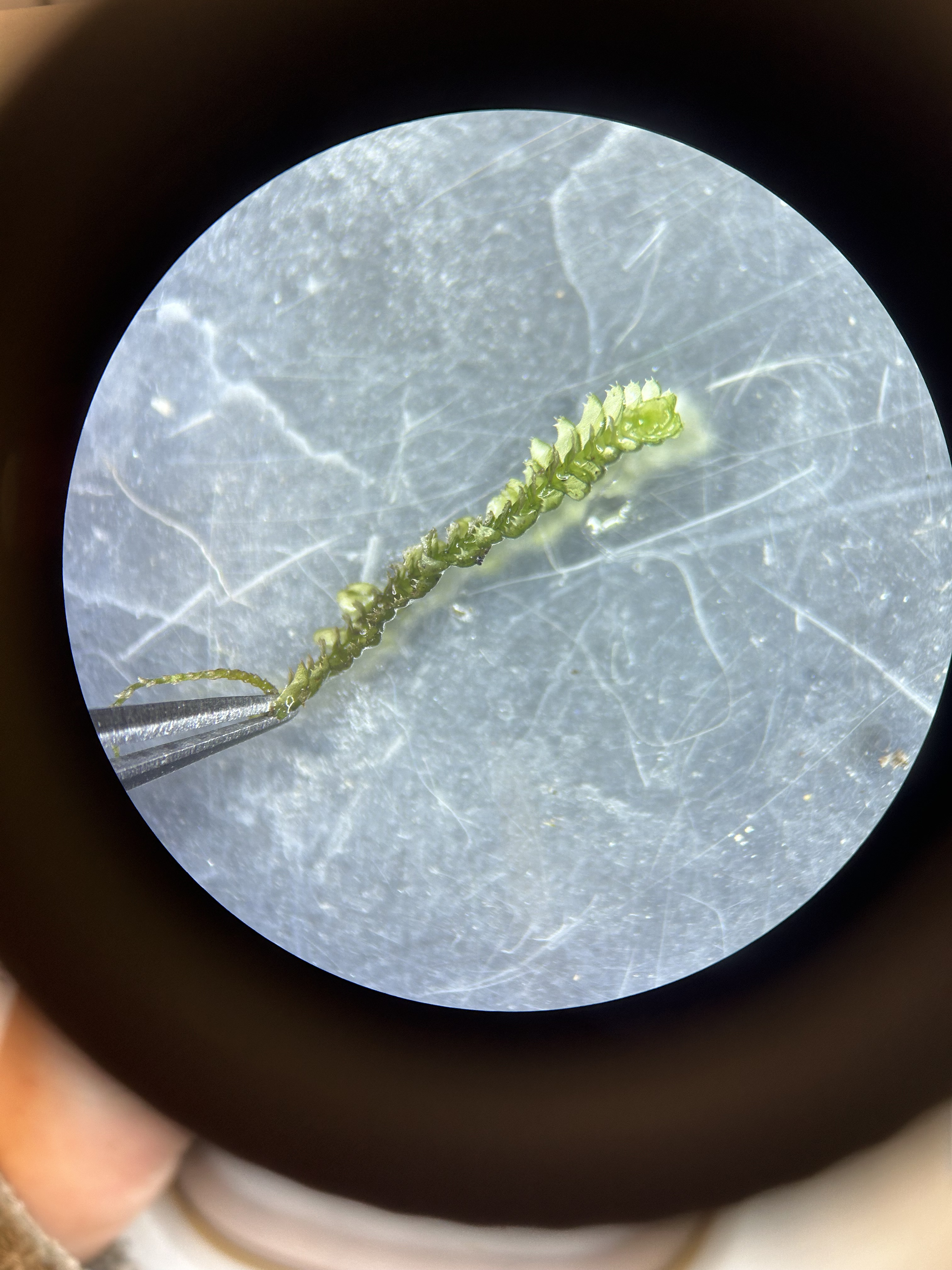
Ventral leaves of Schistochila lehmanniana

== Habitat and Distribution ==
Schistochila lehmanniana is distributed throughout Australia and New Zealand. It is highly abundant throughout Tasmania, and is predominantly found across the western coast where the environment is wetter. It is also found across the south eastern coast of the mainland of Australia as well as southern New Zealand.

Schistochila lehmanniana is found in wet forests and rainforests and inhabits varying substrates. As S. lehmanniana is a liverwort, it is non-vascular, meaning all water must be absorbed directly through tissue rather than through a vascular system. This restricts it to only growing in frequently moistened substrates.

== Taxonomy ==
Schistochila lehmanniana is a species of the family Schistochilaceae which is a family of leafy liverworts found in tropical and temperate regions across the Southern Hemisphere, predominantly in South America, West Antarctica, New Zealand, New Caledonia and Australia. There are four different genera of Schistochilaceae and approximately 100 species classed within the Schistochila genus.

== Life cycle and reproduction ==
Schistochila lehmanniana are able to reproduce asexually and sexually. They are able to re- shoot from fragments of their leaves that have been broken off of the main body. Alternatively they sexually reproduce while in their gametophyte stage (this is their dominant form), where a sperm swims through water from the male antheridia structure to the female archegonium where the egg is fertilised into a sporophyte. The sporophyte stage is only short lived and involves the release of spores which asexually mature into gametophytes, completing the life cycle of S. lehmanniana.
