= Schistochila vitreocincta =

Conservation status
- Vulnerable (IUCN 2.3)

Scientific classification
- Kingdom: Plantae
- Division: Marchantiophyta
- Class: Jungermanniopsida
- Order: Perssoniellales
- Family: Schistochilaceae
- Genus: Schistochila
- Species: S. vitreocincta

Binomial name
- Schistochila vitreocincta (Herzog) X.L.He & Glenny

Synonyms
- Perssoniella vitreocincta Herzog

Genus of liverworts

Schistochila vitreocincta is a species of liverwort in the family Schistochilaceae. Under its synonym Perssoniella vitreocincta it was the only species in the monotypic genus Perssoniella and family Perssoniellaceae. It is endemic to New Caledonia. Its natural habitat is subtropical or tropical dry forests.
