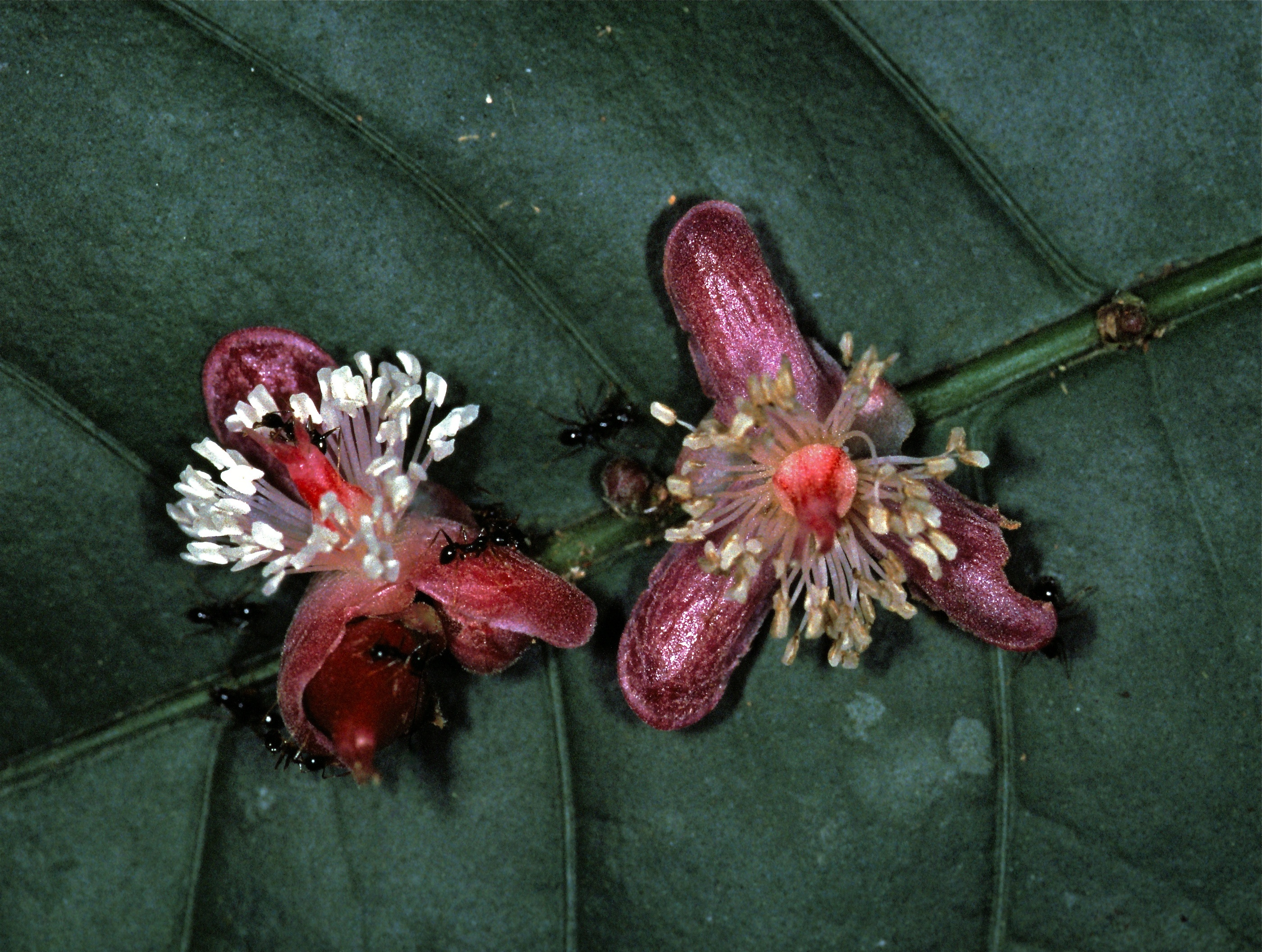
- Epiphyllous inflorescence of Phyllobotryon spathulatum Müll.Arg.

Scientific classification
- Kingdom: Plantae
- Clade: Tracheophytes
- Clade: Angiosperms
- Clade: Eudicots
- Clade: Rosids
- Order: Malpighiales
- Family: Salicaceae
- Subfamily: Salicoideae
- Tribe: Scolopieae
- Genus: Phyllobotryon; Müll.Arg.

Type species
- Phyllobotryon spathulatum Müll.Arg.

Synonyms
- Phylloclinium Baill.

= Phyllobotryon =

Genus of plants

Phyllobotryon is a genus of flowering plants belonging to the family Salicaceae native to the region spanning from Nigeria to Tanzania and Angola.

== Description ==
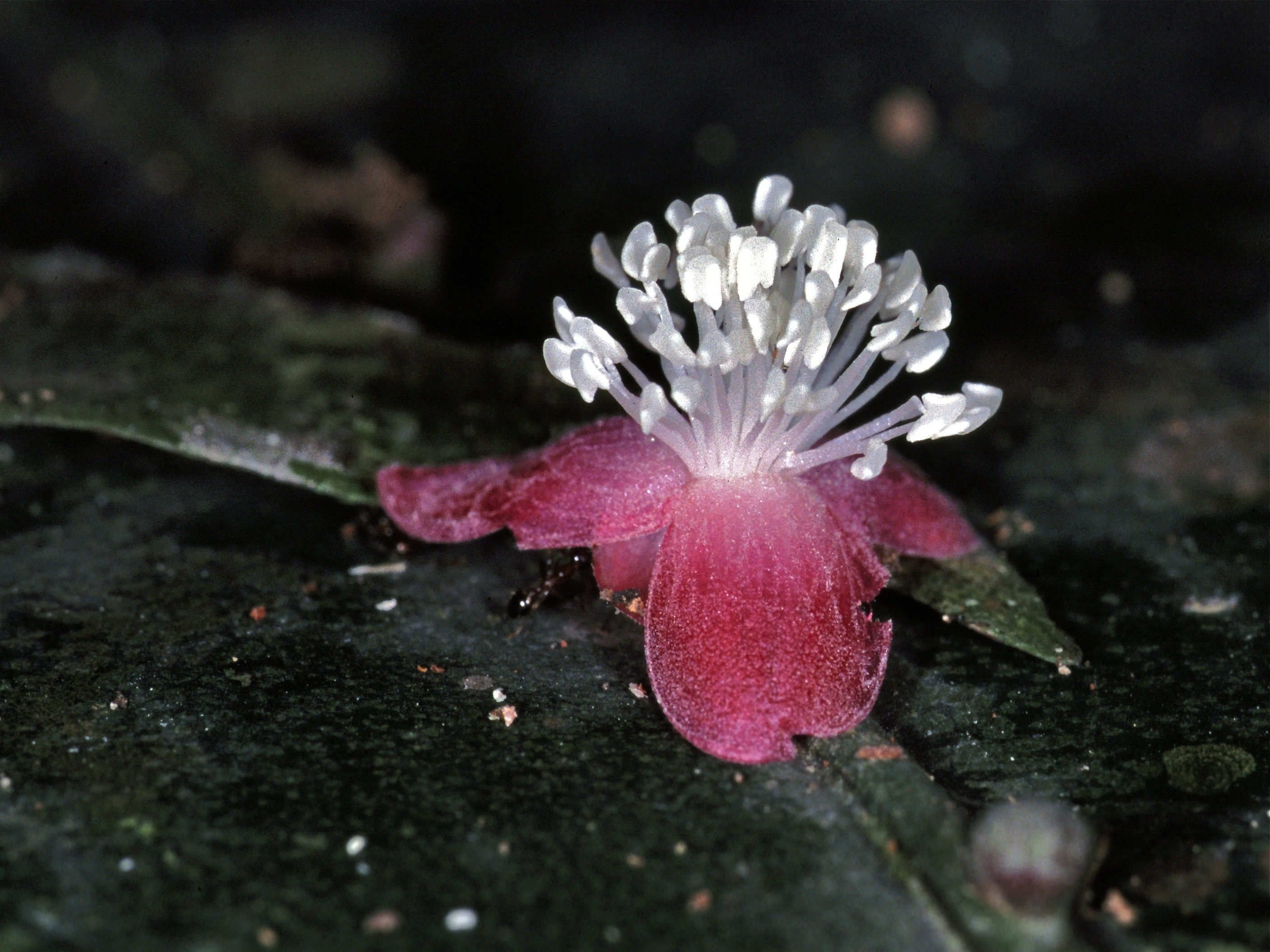
Detail of Phyllobotryon spathulatum Müll.Arg. flower

=== Vegetative characteristics ===
Species of Phyllobotryon are small trees with large, alternately arranged leaves. The leaf venation is pinnate.

=== Generative characteristics ===
The genus displays unusual reproductive structures, as the axis of the epiphyllous inflorescence is fused with the petiole and the lower part of the midrib of a fused leaf.

== Taxonomy ==
Phyllobotryon Müll.Arg. was published by Johannes Müller Argoviensis in 1864. The type species is Phyllobotryon spathulatum Müll.Arg. It was originally placed in the family Flacourtiaceae Rich. ex DC., which is now included within the family Salicaceae Mirb. Several orthographical variants exist (e.g., Phyllobotryum and Phyllobotrion). The accepted spelling is Phyllobotryon.

=== Species ===
It has 5 species:

- Phyllobotryon bracteatum (Lecomte) Hul
- Phyllobotryon lebrunii Staner
- Phyllobotryon maikoense Bamps & Lejoly
- Phyllobotryon paradoxum (Baill.) Hul
- Phyllobotryon spathulatum Müll.Arg.
