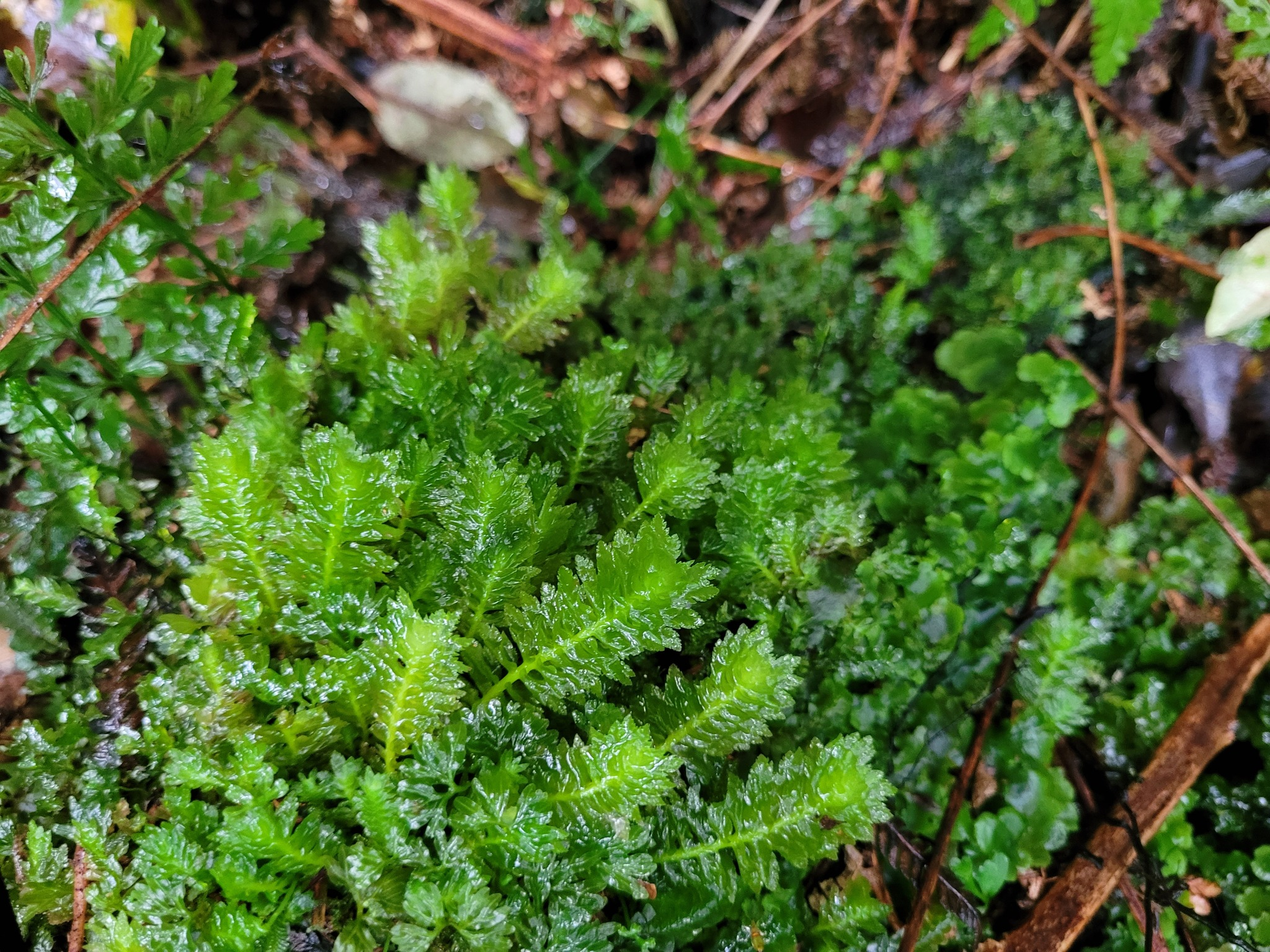

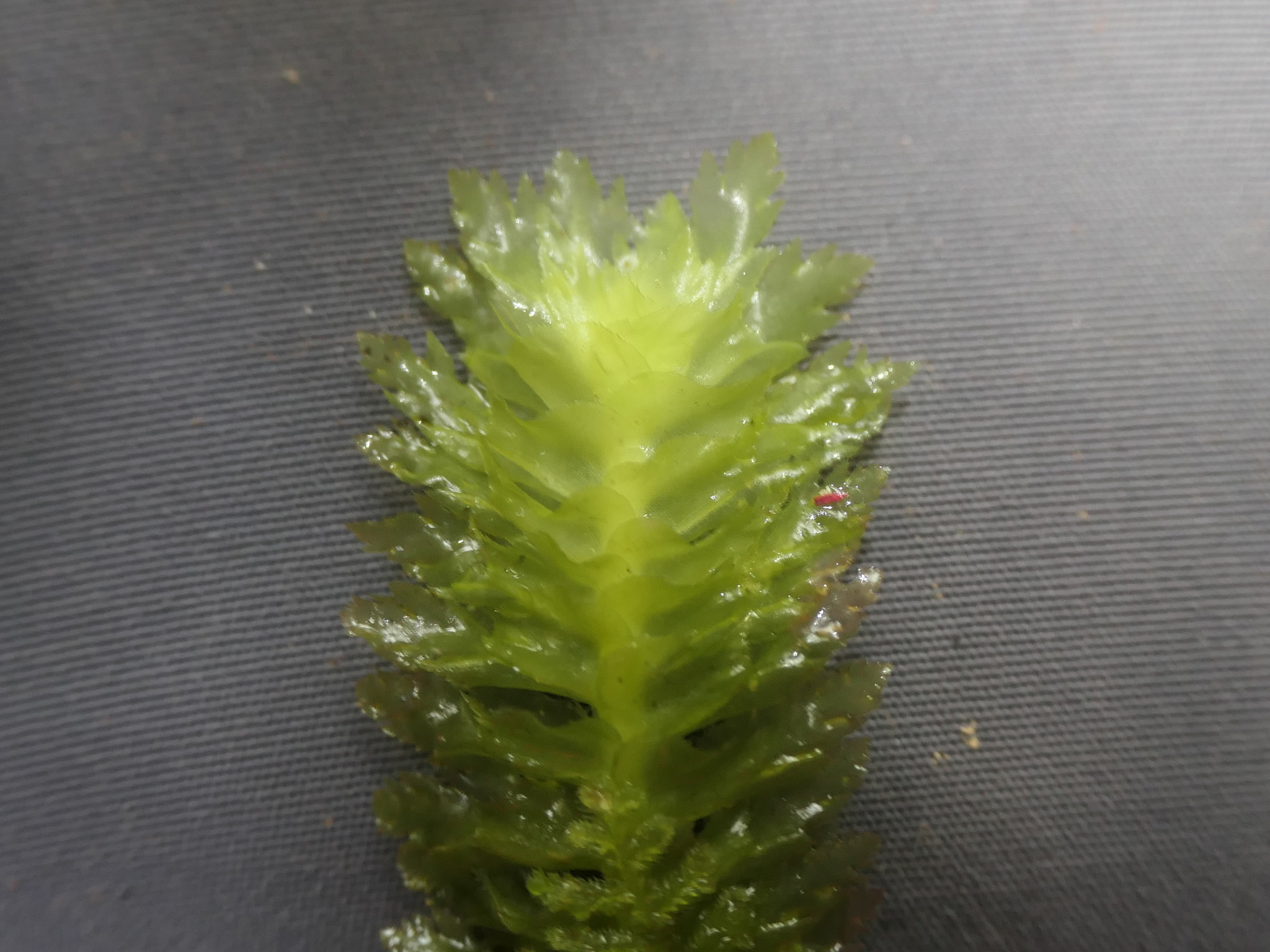

Scientific classification
- Kingdom: Plantae
- Division: Marchantiophyta
- Class: Jungermanniopsida
- Order: Perssoniellales
- Family: Schistochilaceae
- Genus: Schistochila
- Species: S. appendiculata

Binomial name
- Schistochila appendiculata (Hook.) Dumort. ex Trevis.

= Schistochila appendiculata =

Largest species of liverwort

Schistochila appendiculata is a species of liverwort native to New Zealand. It is currently the largest species of liverwort discovered growing up to 1.1 metres or more in height and a diameter of 2.6 centimetres.

== Habitat ==
This species is native to New Zealand occurring on all three of the major islands (North, South and Stewart). It grows in lowland forests.

== Description ==
While liverworts are typically very small plants that rarely grow more than 19 centimetres long. However S. appendiculata can grow up to 1.1 metres in height with a diameter of 2.6 centimetres and a stem diameter of 10 centimetres.

== See also ==
- List of largest plants
