= Schistochila macrodonta =

Conservation status
- Endangered (IUCN 2.3)

Scientific classification
- Kingdom: Plantae
- Division: Marchantiophyta
- Class: Jungermanniopsida
- Order: Perssoniellales
- Family: Schistochilaceae
- Genus: Schistochila
- Species: S. macrodonta

Binomial name
- Schistochila macrodonta W.E.Nicholson

Synonyms
- Gottschea macrodonta (W.E.Nicholson) C.Gao & Y.Huan Wu

Species of liverwort

Schistochila macrodonta is an endangered species of liverwort in the family Schistochilaceae. It is found in Bhutan and China. This large, unbranched liverwort, characterised by its shoots measuring 4–6 cm (1.6–2.4 in) in length and distinctive two-lobed leaves with smooth margins, is found only in high-altitude temperate and subtropical forests of Bhutan and China's Yunnan Province, at elevations between 2,730–3,580 m (8,960–11,750 ft). The species has reddish-brown rhizoids and the unusual presence of bicellular propagules at its leaf tips. Its extremely restricted distribution, known from only a few locations spanning less than 500 km^{2} (190 sq mi), has led to its classification as endangered on the IUCN Red List due to ongoing habitat decline.

== Taxonomy ==
Schistochila macrodonta, a member of the family Schistochilaceae, was first described in 1930 by the bryologist William Edward Nicholson. The type specimen was gathered by the Austrian botanist Heinrich von Handel-Mazzetti on 5 July 1916, in northwest Yunnan, China, specifically in the region of Jiang County between the Salwin and Irrawaddy rivers, at elevations ranging from 2,800–3,450 m (9,190–11,320 ft).

The species has also been referred to by the synonym Gottschea macrodonta, as designated by the botanists Chien Gao and Yu-Huan Wu. The classification of this species has been subject to taxonomic debate. In 2003, researcher So proposed merging the genus Gottschea into Schistochila, effectively making them synonyms. However, in 2004, Gao and Wu maintained Gottschea as a separate genus and continued to use the name Gottschea macrodonta for this species.

== Description ==
Schistochila macrodonta is a relatively large species of liverwort. The plants are unbranched and feature shoots that range from 4–6 cm (1.6–2.4 in) in length and 0.7–1.0 cm (0.28–0.39 in) in width, making them relatively sizeable for liverworts. On the underside of the plant (the ventral surface), there are reddish-brown rhizoids that extend up to the tip of the stem. Rhizoids are root-like structures that help anchor the plant and absorb water and nutrients. In this species, the rhizoids are non-septate, meaning they lack internal divisions or cross walls.

The stem of the plant is slender, measuring about 0.6–0.7 mm (0.024–0.028 in) thick, and does not have paraphyllia—small leaf-like structures found in some related plants. The leaves are closely overlapping (imbricate) and spread widely from the stem. Each leaf is divided into two parts: the dorsal lobe (upper part) and the ventral lobe (lower part). The dorsal lobe is broadly obovate, which means it is shaped like an upside-down egg with the wider end at the tip. It measures approximately 3.5–3.8 mm (0.14–0.15 in) in length and 2.2–2.6 mm (0.087–0.102 in) in width, being widest at the base. This lobe is about half the size of the ventral lobe and has a truncate apex, giving it a squared-off appearance at the tip.

The ventral lobe is oblong-ovate—longer than it is wide with rounded ends—and measures about 5.0–5.7 mm (0.20–0.22 in) in length and 2.4–3.1 mm (0.094–0.122 in) in width. It tapers to an acute apex, ending in a sharp point. The edges (margins) of both the dorsal and ventral lobes are mostly smooth (entire), though they may occasionally have small angulations or slight bends.

Under a microscope, the cells just below the leaf tips (subapical cells) and in the middle of the leaf lobes (median cells) are approximately 28–30 μm (0.028–0.030 mm) wide and 30–35 μm (0.030–0.035 mm) long. The cells at the base of the leaves are larger, about 30–35 μm (0.030–0.035 mm) wide and 40–50 μm (0.040–0.050 mm) long. These cells have large, nodulose trigones—thickened corners within the cell walls—which contribute to the overall slight thickening of the cell walls. The plant's outer layer, the cuticle, is smooth.

Schistochila macrodonta lacks underleaves, which are small leaves that some liverworts have beneath their main leaves. The species has only been observed in a sterile state, meaning that reproductive structures like spores have not been seen. While S. macrodonta shares some similarities with another species, Schistochila aligera, such as the shape of some leaf lobes and cell sizes, it is distinguished by its larger overall size and the greatly expanded base of its dorsal leaf lobe. The margins of its leaves are smoother, with only slight bends rather than pronounced teeth or serrations.

The original description of S. macrodonta mentioned the presence of bicellular propagules—tiny reproductive structures—at the tips of its leaves. However, subsequent examinations of both the original specimen and more recent collections have found these structures to be rare. When present, they resemble gemmae, which are small clumps of cells used for asexual reproduction in other liverworts like those in the genus Radula. The occurrence of gemmae is unusual for the genus Schistochila, making this a prominent feature of S. macrodonta.

== Distribution and habitat ==
The species appears to be rare, known from only a few locations and specimens. Schistochila macrodonta is found in high-altitude regions of China and Bhutan. The type specimen—the original plant used to describe the species—was collected in 1916 from northwestern Yunnan Province in China, specifically in the area between the Salween and Irrawaddy rivers, at elevations between 2,800–3,450 m (9,190–11,320 ft) above sea level.

Despite its initial discovery in China, no recent collections of this species have been reported from the country. However, additional specimens have been found in Bhutan. In 1979, a specimen was collected near a large waterfall above Namning, southeast of Sengor in the Mongar District, at an elevation of approximately 2,730 m (8,960 ft). Another specimen was collected in 2000 from the east side of Pang La, at an elevation of 3,580 m (11,750 ft).

== Conservation ==
Schistochila macrodonta was first listed in the IUCN world red list of bryophytes in 2000. The species is classified as Endangered, primarily due to its extremely restricted distribution and ongoing habitat decline. Its known area of occupancy spans less than 500 km^{2} (190 sq mi), encompassing just two confirmed localities across China and Bhutan. While the specific threats to S. macrodonta are not fully documented, its conservation status is concerning due to several factors. The species occurs in areas where habitat degradation is ongoing, and its highly specific habitat requirements—including its preference for damp, shaded forest environments—may make it particularly vulnerable to environmental changes. The current population trend remains unknown, highlighting the need for additional research and monitoring.

The species' rarity presents a significant challenge for conservation efforts. Despite botanical surveys in the region, S. macrodonta has only been documented from its original location in Yunnan's monsoon forests and in Bhutan's wet mixed broad-leaved forests. This limited distribution, combined with the general threats to these forest ecosystems, suggests that focused conservation measures may be necessary to ensure the species' long-term survival.
