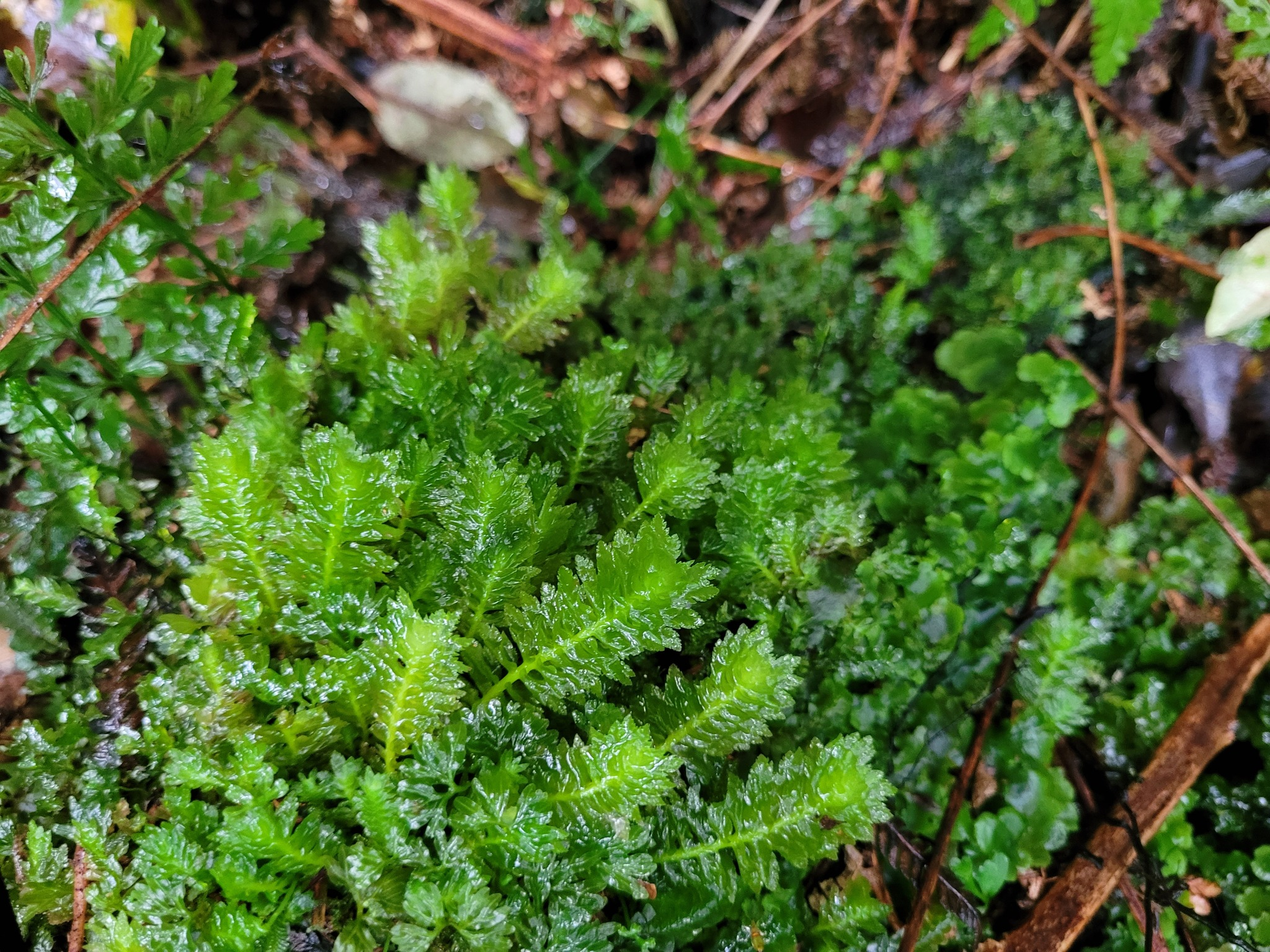
- Schistochila appendiculata in New Zealand

Scientific classification
- Kingdom: Plantae
- Division: Marchantiophyta
- Class: Jungermanniopsida
- Order: Perssoniellales; R.M.Schust.
- Family: Schistochilaceae; H.Buch
- Genus: Schistochila; Dumort.

Species
- See text

Synonyms
- Gottschea Nees ex Montagne 1843; Fulfordistria Miller 1970; Notarisia Colla 1836 non Hampe; Pachyschistochila Schuster & Engel 1982; Paraschistochila Schuster 1963; Perssoniella Herzog 1952; Pleurocladopsis Schuster 1964; Schistochilaster Miller 1970; Tegulifolium Hässel de Menendez 1973

= Schistochila =

Genus of liverworts

Schistochila is a genus of liverworts in the order Jungermanniales. It is the only genus in the family Schistochilaceae.

== Species ==
As accepted by GBIF;

- Schistochila aberrans Stephani
- Schistochila acuminata Steph.
- Schistochila aequiloba Steph.
- Schistochila alata (Lehm.) Schiffn.
- Schistochila aligera (Nees & Blume) J.B.Jack & Steph.
- Schistochila altissima E.A.Hodgs.
- Schistochila amboinensis Stephani
- Schistochila antara Grolle
- Schistochila appendiculata (Hook.) Dumort. ex Trevis.
- Schistochila baileyana Steph.
- Schistochila balfouriana (Hook.f. & Taylor) Steph.
- Schistochila beccariana (De Not.) Trevis.
- Schistochila berggrenii (J.J.Engel & R.M.Schust.) Xiao L.He & Glenny
- Schistochila berteroana (Hook.) Steph.
- Schistochila blumei (Nees) Trevis.
- Schistochila brassii Grolle
- Schistochila buchii Grolle
- Schistochila caledonica Steph.
- Schistochila carnosa (Mitt.) Steph.
- Schistochila caudata R.M.Schust. & J.J.Engel
- Schistochila childii (R.M.Schust. & J.J.Engel) Xiao L.He & Glenny
- Schistochila chlorophylla (Colenso) E.A.Hodgs.
- Schistochila ciliata (Mitt.) Steph.
- Schistochila compacta (Colenso) E.A.Hodgs.
- Schistochila conchophylla Herzog ex E.A.Hodgs. & Allison
- Schistochila confertifolia Stephani
- Schistochila congoana Steph.
- Schistochila cookei (H.A.Mill.) R.M.Schust.
- Schistochila crinita Grolle
- Schistochila cristata Steph.
- Schistochila cunninghamii Steph.
- Schistochila doriae (De Not.) Trevis.
- Schistochila engleriana Steph.
- Schistochila exalata Herzog
- Schistochila fijiensis H.Buch & Herzog
- Schistochila flavicans Stephani
- Schistochila flavovirens (Colenso) E.A.Hodgs.
- Schistochila formosa Horik.
- Schistochila fuegiana Hässel de Menéndez
- Schistochila gayana (Gottsche) Stephani
- Schistochila glaucescens (Hook.) A.Evans
- Schistochila gradsteinii Thouvenot, 2021
- Schistochila grossitexta Stephani
- Schistochila hattorii Grolle
- Schistochila integerrima Steph.
- Schistochila isotachyphylla (J.J.Engel & R.M.Schust.) Xiao L.He & Glenny
- Schistochila kirkiana Steph.
- Schistochila kunkelii S.W.Arnell
- Schistochila lacerata Steph.
- Schistochila lamellata (Hook.) Dumort. ex A.Evans
- Schistochila laminigera (Hook.f. & Taylor) A.Evans
- Schistochila latiloba (R.M.Schust. & J.J.Engel) Xiao L.He & Glenny
- Schistochila lehmanniana (Lindenb.) Steph.
- Schistochila leucophylla (Lehm. ex Gottsche, Lindenb. & Nees) Steph.
- Schistochila limbata S.W.Arnell
- Schistochila loriana Stephani
- Schistochila macrodonta W.E.Nicholson
- Schistochila minor C.Gao & Y.H.Wu
- Schistochila monticola R.M.Schust.
- Schistochila muricata E.A.Hodgs. & Allison
- Schistochila nadeaudiana Steph.
- Schistochila neesii (Mont.) Lindb.
- Schistochila nitida (Colenso) E.A.Hodgs.
- Schistochila nitidissima R.M.Schust.
- Schistochila nivicola (R.M.Schust. & J.J.Engel) Xiao L.He & Glenny
- Schistochila nobilis (Hook.) Trevis.
- Schistochila nuda Horik.
- Schistochila nymannii Steph.
- Schistochila pachyphylla (Lehm.) Steph.
- Schistochila papillifera R.M.Schust.
- Schistochila parvistipula Rodway
- Schistochila pauciserrata Kiaer & Pearson
- Schistochila pellucida R.M.Schust. & J.J.Engel
- Schistochila piligera Steph.
- Schistochila pinnatifolia (Hook.) Trevis.
- Schistochila pluriciliata R.M.Schust. & J.J.Engel
- Schistochila pseudociliata R.M.Schust.
- Schistochila pseudokirkiana R.M.Schust.
- Schistochila pusilla (Schiffner) Stephani
- Schistochila quadrifida A.Evans
- Schistochila ramentacea Steph.
- Schistochila reflexa (Mont.) Steph.
- Schistochila reflexistipula J.J.Engel & R.M.Schust.
- Schistochila reinwardtii (Nees) Schiffn.
- Schistochila repleta (Hook.f. & Taylor) Steph.
- Schistochila rigidula Horik.
- Schistochila rotundistipula Stephani
- Schistochila ruahinensis E.A.Hodgs.
- Schistochila rubriseta Steph.
- Schistochila schultzei Steph.
- Schistochila sciophila R.M.Schust.
- Schistochila sciurea (Nees) Schiffn.
- Schistochila simulans (C.Massal.) Xiao L.He & Yu Sun
- Schistochila spegazziniana (C.Massal.) Steph.
- Schistochila sphagnoides (Schwägr.) Lindb. ex Steph.
- Schistochila splachnophylla (Hook.f. & Taylor) Steph.
- Schistochila stratosa (Mont.) A.Evans
- Schistochila subhyalina R.M.Schust.
- Schistochila subimmersa J.J.Engel & R.M.Schust.
- Schistochila succulenta (J.J.Engel & R.M.Schust.) Xiao L.He & Glenny
- Schistochila sumatrana Stephani
- Schistochila tasmanica Steph.
- Schistochila thouarsii (Hook.) Trevis.
- Schistochila trispiralis R.M.Schust.
- Schistochila tuloides (Hook.f. & Taylor) Steph.
- Schistochila undulatifolia Piippo
- Schistochila virescens R.M.Schust.
- Schistochila vitreocincta (Herzog) Xiao L.He & Glenny
- Schistochila volans Grolle
- Schistochila yakushimensis N.Ohnishi & Deguchi
- Schistochila zantenii Grolle
