= Caloncoba lophocarpa =

Conservation status
- Vulnerable (IUCN 3.1)

Scientific classification
- Kingdom: Plantae
- Clade: Tracheophytes
- Clade: Angiosperms
- Clade: Eudicots
- Clade: Rosids
- Order: Malpighiales
- Family: Achariaceae
- Genus: Caloncoba
- Species: C. lophocarpa

Binomial name
- Caloncoba lophocarpa (Oliv.) Gilg

Synonyms
- Oncoba lophocarpa Oliv.; Paraphyadanthe lophocarpa (Oliv.) Gilg

Species of flowering plant

Caloncoba lophocarpa, synonym Oncoba lophocarpa, is a species of plant in the Achariaceae family. It is endemic to Cameroon. Its natural habitats are subtropical or tropical moist lowland forests and subtropical or tropical moist montane forests. It is threatened by habitat loss caused by forest clearance for wood and agriculture.
