= Schistochila undulatifolia =

Conservation status
- Critically Endangered (IUCN 2.3)

Scientific classification
- Kingdom: Plantae
- Division: Marchantiophyta
- Class: Jungermanniopsida
- Order: Perssoniellales
- Family: Schistochilaceae
- Genus: Schistochila
- Species: S. undulatifolia

Binomial name
- Schistochila undulatifolia Piippo

Species of liverwort

Schistochila undulatifolia is a species of liverwort in the family Schistochilaceae. It is endemic to Papua New Guinea. Its natural habitat is subtropical or tropical dry forests. It is threatened by habitat loss.
