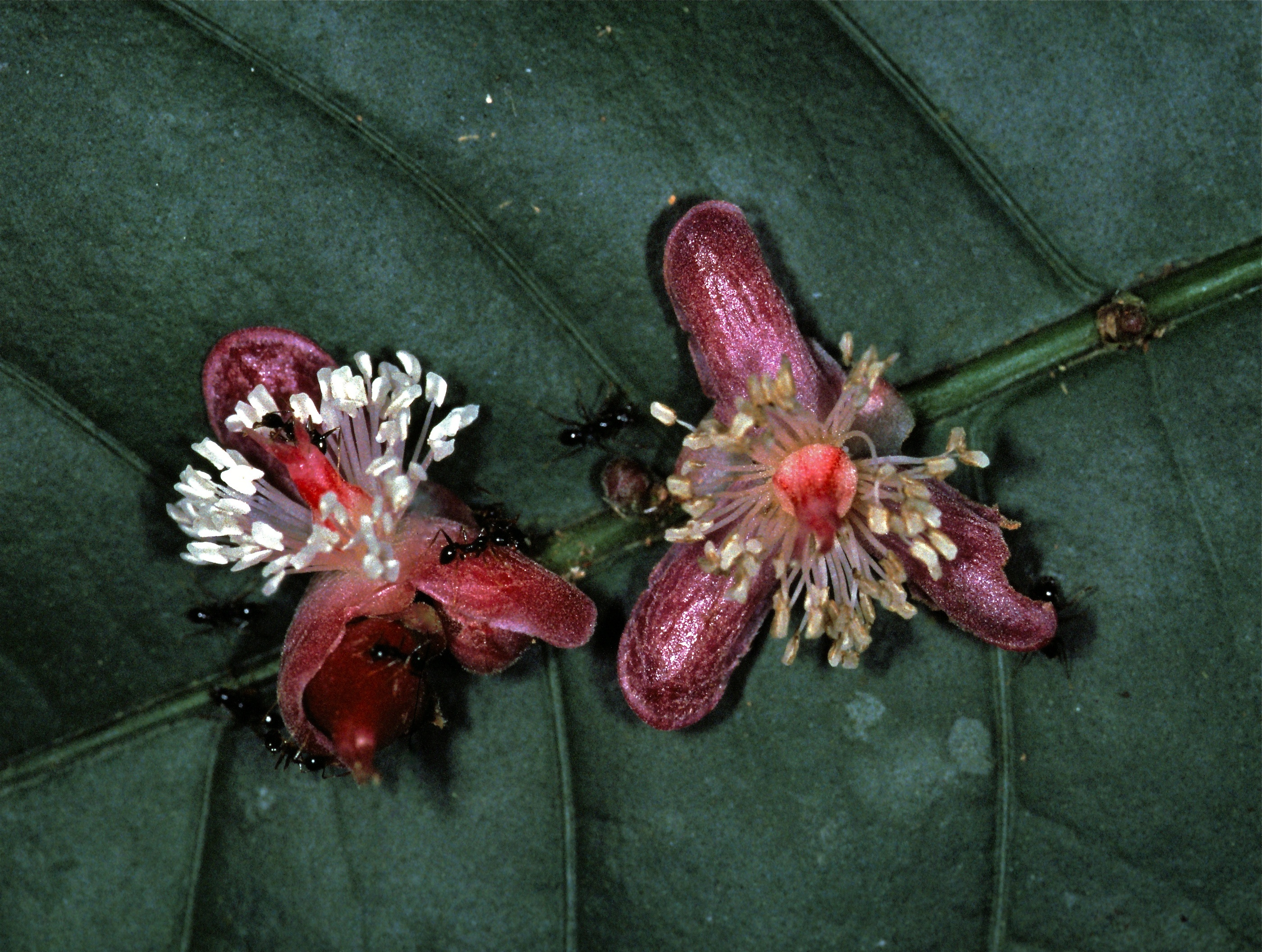
- Epiphyllous inflorescence of Phyllobotryon spathulatum Müll.Arg.

Scientific classification
- Kingdom: Plantae
- Clade: Tracheophytes
- Clade: Angiosperms
- Clade: Eudicots
- Clade: Rosids
- Order: Malpighiales
- Family: Salicaceae
- Genus: Phyllobotryon
- Species: P. spathulatum

Binomial name
- Phyllobotryon spathulatum Müll.Arg.

Synonyms
- Phyllobotryon basiflorum Gilg; Phyllobotryon breviflorum Gilg ex Engl.; Phyllobotryon soyauxianum Baill.; Phyllobotryon zenkeri Gilg; Phylloclinium soyauxianum Baill. ex Warb.

= Phyllobotryon spathulatum =

Species of flowering plant

Phyllobotryon spathulatum is a species of tree in the family Salicaceae native to Cameroon, Gabon, and Nigeria.

== Description ==
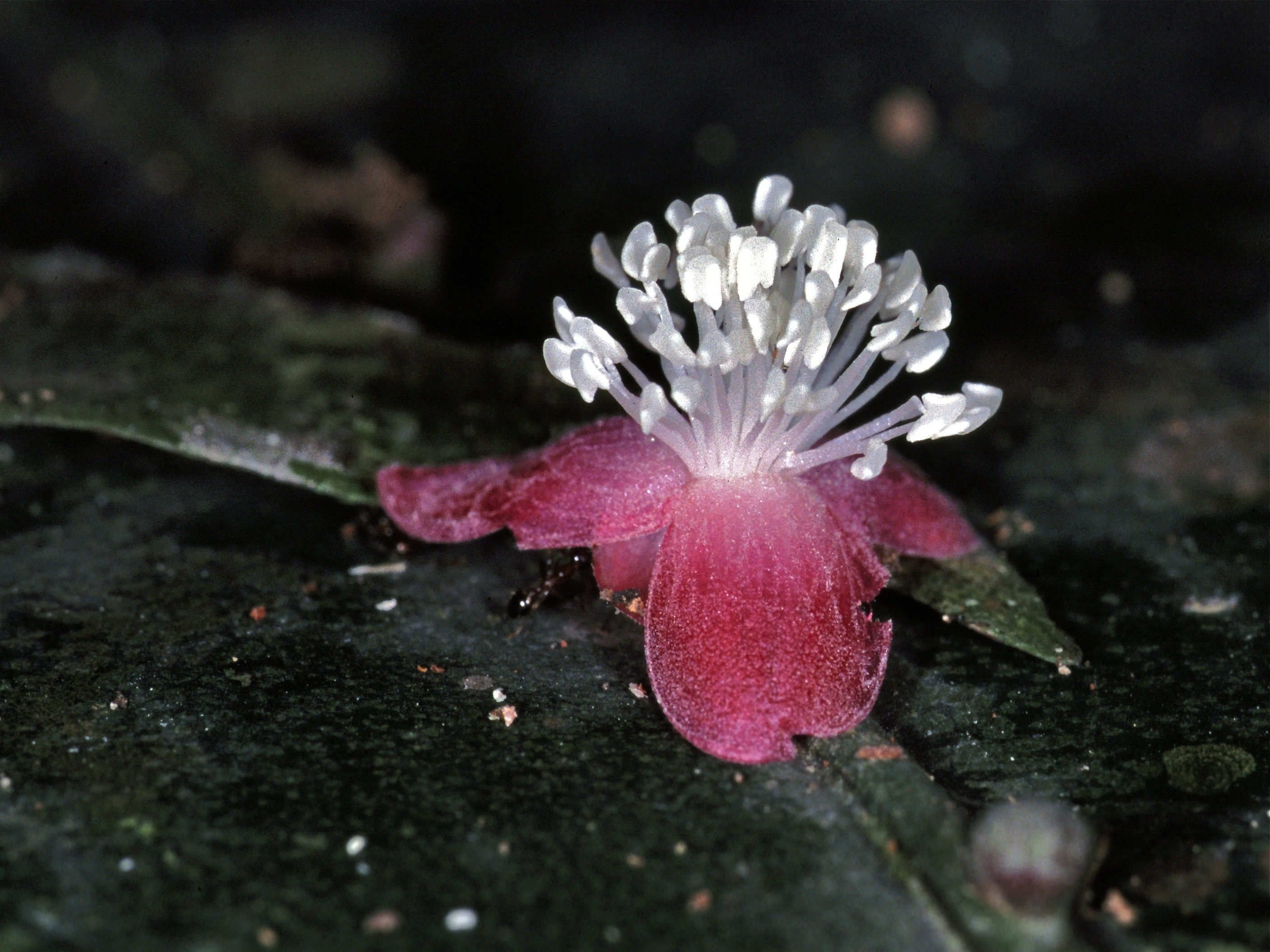
Detail of Phyllobotryon spathulatum Müll.Arg. flower

The species grows to about 12 feet (3.7 m) in height. Its leaves are uncommonly large and grow to 40 inches (100 cm) long by 7 inches (18 cm) wide. It is especially noted for its flowers, which grow in several evenly-spaced clusters along the midrib of the leaves. It is believed that an inflorescence has become fused to the midrib, as in the lindens (Tilia spp). The small red flowers are trimerous, with 3 sepals, 3 petals a pistil with 3 stigmata and about thirty stamens.

== Taxonomy ==
It was published by Johannes Müller Argoviensis in 1864. It is the type species of its genus.
