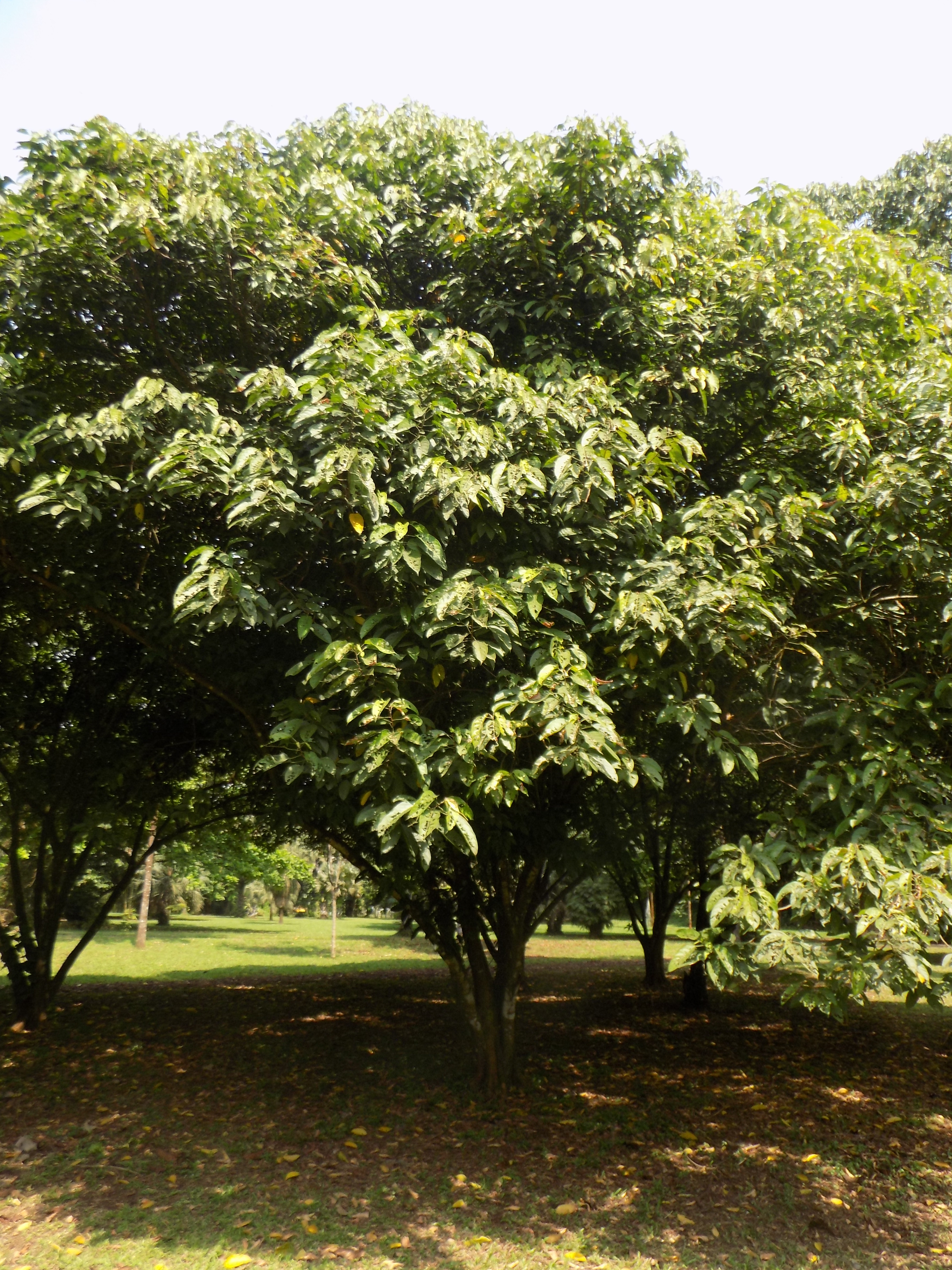
- Caloncoba glauca

Scientific classification
- Kingdom: Plantae
- Clade: Tracheophytes
- Clade: Angiosperms
- Clade: Eudicots
- Clade: Rosids
- Order: Malpighiales
- Family: Achariaceae
- Genus: Caloncoba; Gilg

Synonyms
- Ventenatia P.Beauv.; Paraphyadanthe Mildbr.

= Caloncoba =

Genus of flowering plants

Caloncoba is a genus of flowering plants belonging to the family Achariaceae.

Its native range is tropical Africa.

Species:

- Caloncoba brevipes (Stapf) Gilg
- Caloncoba crepiniana (De Wild. & T.Durand) Gilg
- Caloncoba echinata (Oliv.) Gilg
- Caloncoba flagelliflora (Mildbr.) Gilg ex Pellegr.
- Caloncoba gilgiana (Sprague) Gilg
- Caloncoba glauca (P.Beauv.) Gilg
- Caloncoba lophocarpa (Oliv.) Gilg
- Caloncoba subtomentosa Gilg
- Caloncoba suffruticosa (Milne-Redh.) Exell & Sleumer
- Caloncoba welwitschii (Oliv.) Gilg
