= Caloncoba flagelliflora =

Conservation status
- Least Concern (IUCN 3.1)

Scientific classification
- Kingdom: Plantae
- Clade: Embryophytes
- Clade: Tracheophytes
- Clade: Angiosperms
- Clade: Eudicots
- Clade: Rosids
- Order: Malpighiales
- Family: Achariaceae
- Genus: Caloncoba
- Species: C. flagelliflora

Binomial name
- Caloncoba flagelliflora (Mildbr.) Gilg ex Pellegr.

Synonyms
- Homotypic Synonyms: Paraphyadanthe flagelliflora Mildbr.; Oncoba flagelliflora (Mildbr.) Hul; Heterotypic Synonyms: Paraphyadanthe coriacea Mildbr.; Paraphyadanthe flagelliflora var. hydrophila Mildbr.

Species of plant

Caloncoba flagelliflora is a species of flowering plant in the family Achariaceae. This rainforest tree is native to southern Cameroon, Gabon and the Congos. Traditionally placed in the Flacourtiaceae it has been reassigned to the small family Achariaceae. The inflorescences, which are panicles, are produced at or below ground level, are somewhat rhizomatous and can extend 12 m (39 ft) from the tree, and be up to 3 m (9.8 ft) wide. The six-petaled white flowers rise just above the forest litter.
