= List of largest seeds =

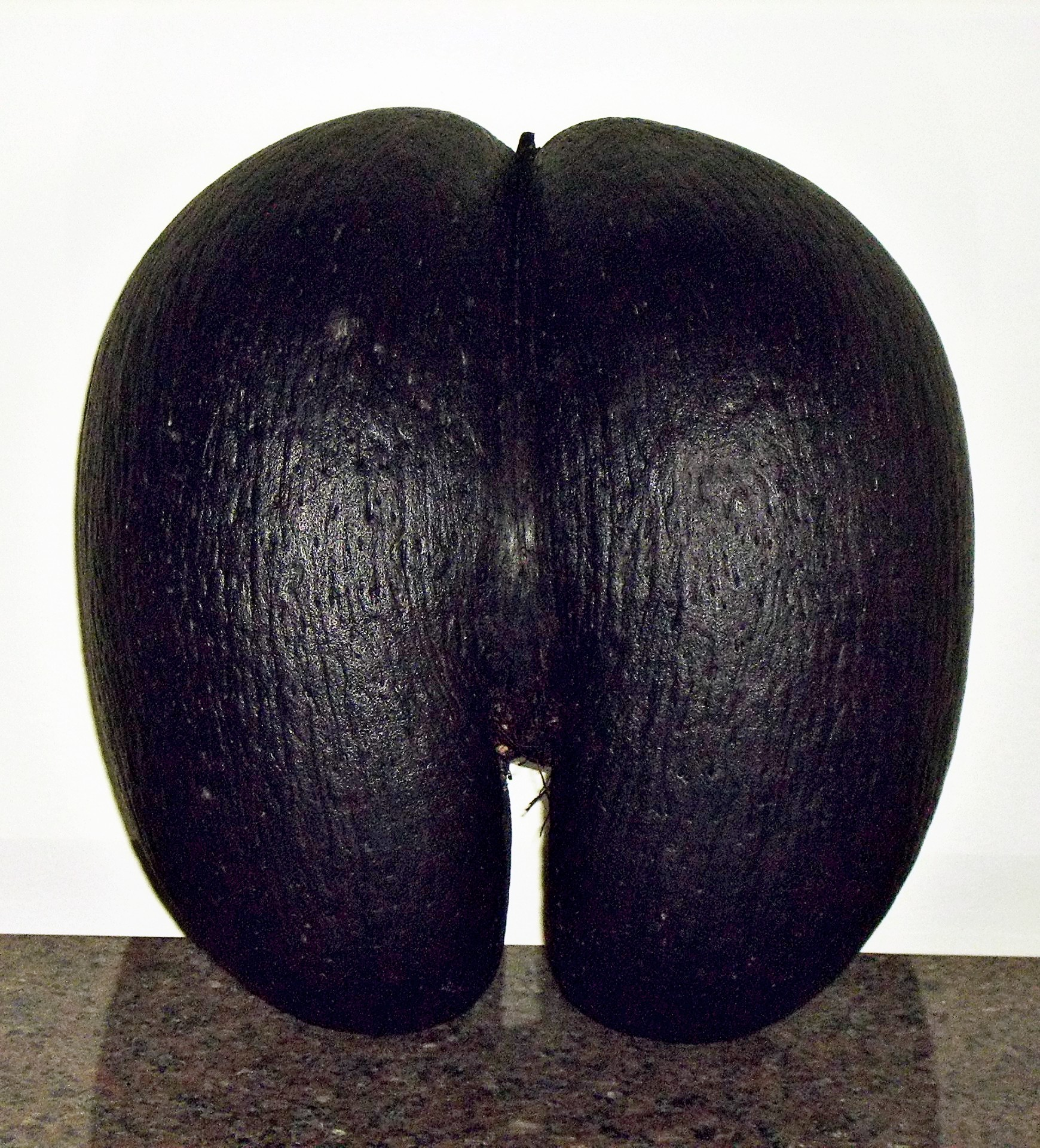
Lodoicea maldivica, native to the Seychelles Archipelago, found in the Indian ocean

The largest seed in the world is the coco de mer, the seed of a palm tree. It can reach about 30 centimetres (12 inches) long, and weigh up to 18 kilograms (40 pounds). The coco de mer, which produces a giant, dark brown seed, has been protected by the government of the Seychelles because of its rarity – the tree can grow up to 31 m (102 ft) tall, with leaves measuring 6 m (20 ft) long and 3.6 m (12 ft) wide. Kigelia or "sausage seed" (botanical name Kigelia africana) can produce pods weighing up to 12 kg (26 lb), and 12–20 cm (4 1/2–8 in) long, but the pod contains seeds.

== List ==
Other recorded largest seeds include:

Seed	Image	Species	Family	Size in inches	Size in cm	Weight	Notes
Coco de mer		Lodoicea maldivica	Palm family (Arecaceae or Palmae)	12 in	30 cm	18 kg (40 lbs)	The single largest Lodoicea seed found to date was one weighing 25 kg (55 lbs).
Coconut		Cocos nucifera	Palm family (Arecaceae or Palmae)	6 inches	15 cm		The Andaman Giant Coconut can have a weight of about 8 lbs (3.6 kg).
Mora or "Mangle Nato"		Mora oleifera or Mora megistosperma	Senna family (Caesalpinaceae)	7 in by 6 in by 3 in	18 cm by 15 cm by 8 cm.	2.2 lbs (1 kg)	
East Indies Palmyra		Borassus sundaicus	Palm family (Arecaceae or Palmae)			2.2 lbs (1 kg)	
African Palmyra		Borassus aethiopum	Palm family (Arecaceae or Palmae)	Up to 4.29 inches by 3.15 in by 2.24 in.	Up to 10.9 cm by 8 cm by 5.7 cm.		
Caroline Ivory Palm		Metroxylon amicarum	Palm family (Arecaceae or Palmae)	4.5 inch sphere	11 cm sphere	1 lb. 4 oz (560 grams)	
Muli		Melocanna baccifera	Grass family (Graminae or Poaceae)	3.9 inches long and nearly as wide.	Ten cm long and nearly as wide.	12.3 oz (350 grams)	
Also called "Mora"		Mora excelsa	Senna family (Caesalpinaceae)	5 in by 2.75 in.	12.5 cm by 8 cm.	8.8 oz (250 grams)	
Tea Mangrove		Pelliciera rhizophorae	Tea or Camellia family (Theaceae)	4 in sphere.	10 cm sphere.	7 oz (200 grams)	
Bornean ironwood, Belian var. "Tanduk"		Eusideroxylon zwageri variety exilis	Laurel family (Lauraceae)	6.3 in by 2 in diam.	160 mm by 5 cm diam.		
Pohon Kira-kira		Xylocarpus granatum	Mahogany family (Meliaceae)	Tetrahedral seeds four inches on a side.	Tetrahedral seeds 10 cm on a side.		Also called "puzzlenut" because the nuts can be reassembled into a sphere.
Chayote		Sechium edule or Sicyos edule	Squash family (Cucurbitaceae)	4 in by 2.75 in by 1 in.	10 cm by 7 cm by 2.5 cm.		
Idiot fruit		Idiospermum australiense	Spicebush family (Calycanthaceae)	3.1 in sphere.	8 cm sphere.	7.9 oz. (225 grams)	Very poisonous.
"Capucin".		Northia seychellana	Sapote Family (Sapotaceae)	3.1 inches, and nearly as wide3.	8 centimeters, and nearly as wide.	weight not stated	
Avocado		Persea americana	Laurel family (Lauraceae)	3 in	7.6 cm		
Chuya		Pouteria speciosa	Sapote family (Sapotaceae)	3.5 in long by 2.4 in thick.	90 mm long by 60 mm thick.		
Boko tree		Balanites wilsoniana	Balanitaceae	3.46 in by 1.81 in diameter.	8.8 cm by 4.7 cm diameter.		
Pacó		Grias tessmannii	Monkeypot family (Lecythidaceae)	3.2 in by 2.5 in.	8 cm by 6.5 cm.		
Cativo		Prioria copaifera	Senna family (Caesalpinaceae)			Up to six ounces (170 grams)	
California buckeye		Aesculus californica	Horse chestnut family (Hippocastanaceae)	2.88 in width, 2.63 in breadth and 2.13 in height.	7.32 cm width, 6.68 cm breadth and 5.41 cm height	5 oz (140 grams)	This is the largest of all temperate (non-tropical) seeds. Poisonous.
Calatola		Calatola costaricensis	Metteniusaceae	3 inches long by two inches wide.	7 cm long by 5 cm wide.		
Provision tree, Guiana chestnut		Pachira aquatica	Kapok family (Bombacaceae)	Squarish seeds to 2.4 inches on a side.	Squarish seeds to 6.1 cm. on a side.		
Elephant Creeper.		Entada phaseoloides	Mimosa family (Mimosaceae)	2.8 in by 2.4 in by 1.0 in.	71 mm by 61 mm by 25 mm.	2.1 oz. (60 grams)	
Tauari		Couratari macrosperma	Monkeypot family (Lecythidaceae)	3.9 inches by 1.2 inches.	10 cm by 3 cm.		
Membrillo		Gustavia dodsonii	Monkeypot family (Lecythidaceae)	2.9 inches by 2,25 inches.	74 mm by 58 mm.		
(no common name)		Macrozamia macdonnellii	Coontie family (Zamiaceae)	3.2 inches by 2.2 inches.	8 cm by 5.5 cm.		The largest of all Gymnosperm seeds.
Amarillo, or South American Apricot.		Mammea americana	Copay Family (Clusiaceae).	3.2 inches by about 2 inches.	8 cm by about 2 cm.		
Also called Tauari		Couratari longipedicellata	Monkeypot family (Lecythidaceae)	Four inches long by 0.9 inches wide.	9.5 cm long by 2.3 cm wide.		
(no common name)		Grias multinervia	Monkeypot family (Lecythidaceae)	3 inches by 1.17 inches.	77 mm by 30 mm.		
Fatra		Cycas thouarsii	Sago palm family (Cycadaceae)	2.75 inches by 2.3 inches.	7 cm by 6 cm.		Pachytesta incrassata of the Carboniferous deposits was up to 5 in by 2.5 in diam (12 cm by 6 cm diam.) and weighed about seven ounces (200 grams).
Mango		Mangifera indica	Sumac family (Anacardiaceae)	2-4 inches			
Peach		Prunus persica	Rose family (Rosaceae)	2 inches	3 cm		

== See also ==
- List of world records held by plants
- List of largest inflorescences
- List of superlative trees
- Seed
- Seedbed
